= Acre, Israel =

City in Israel

Acre עכו (Hebrew) عكا (Arabic)
- City

Hebrew transcription(s)
  - ISO 259: ʕAkko

Arabic transcription(s)
  - ISO 233: ʕAkka
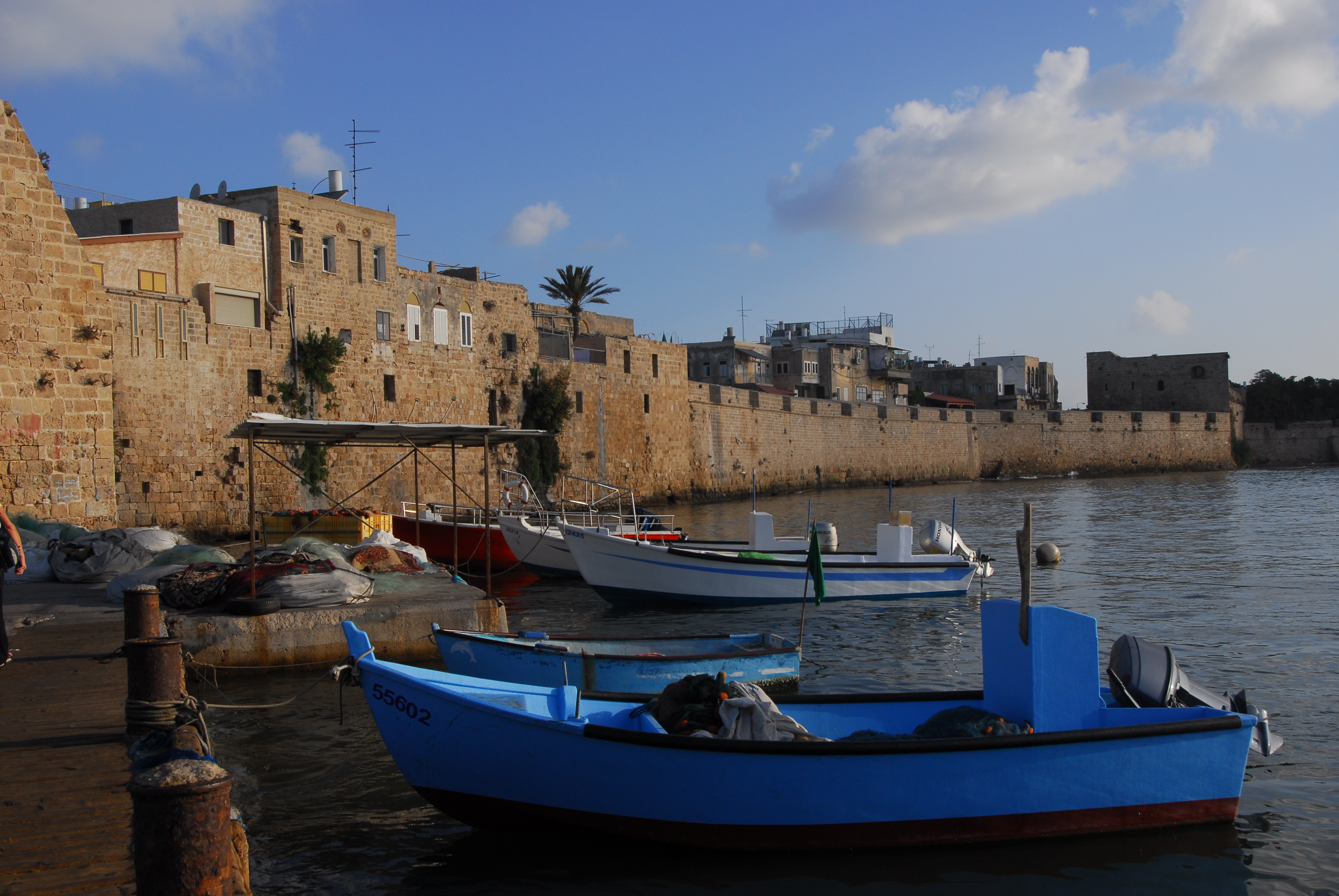
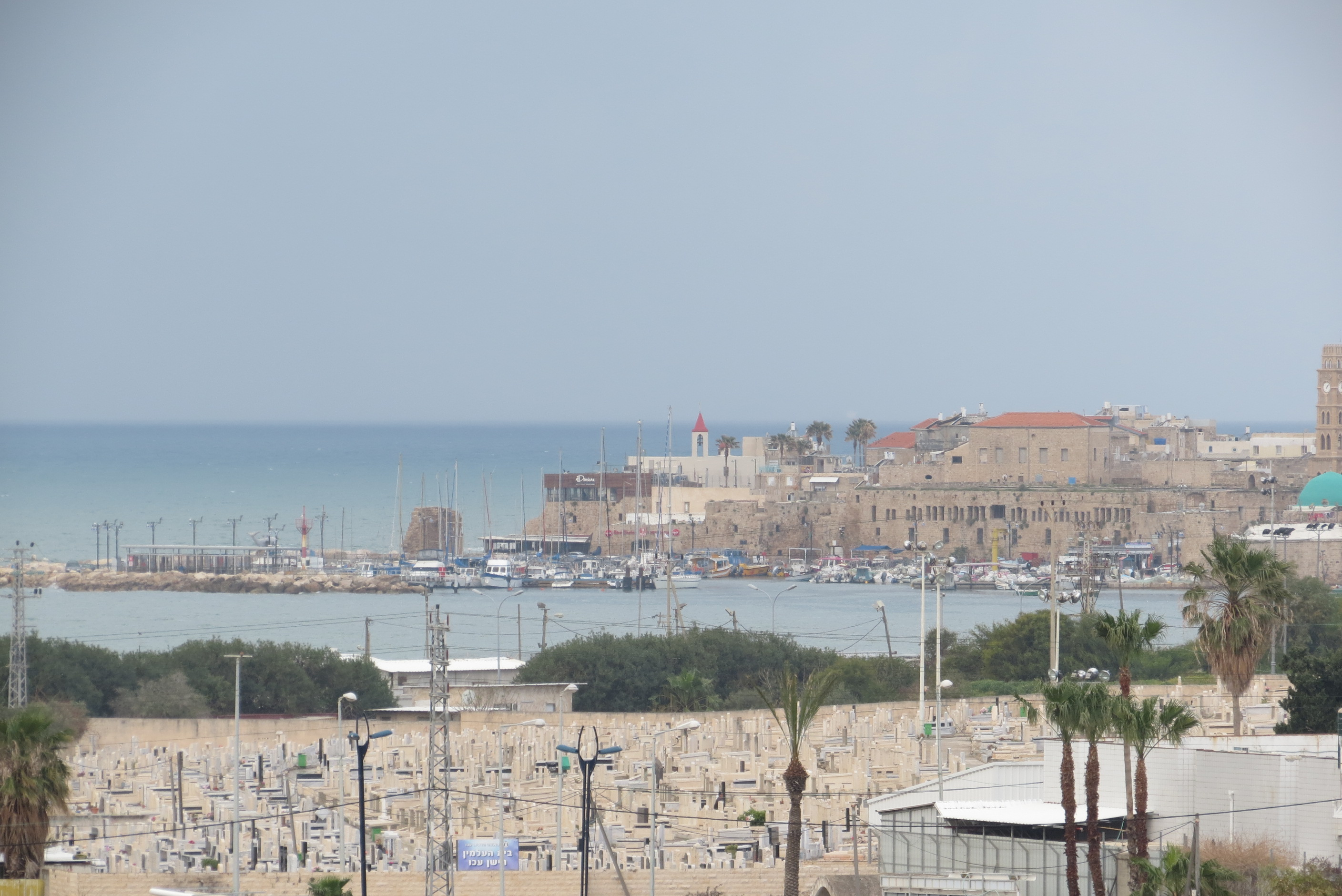
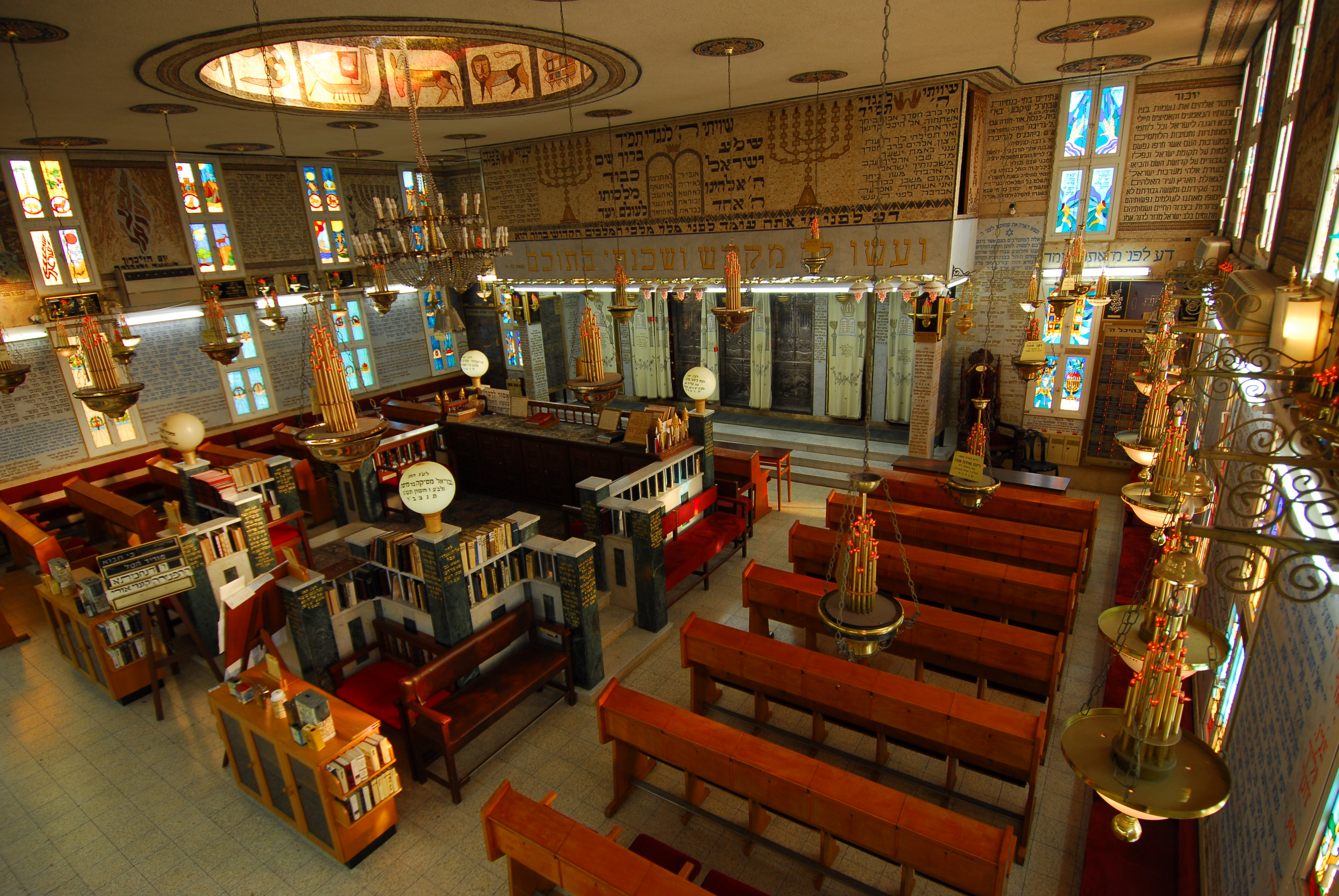
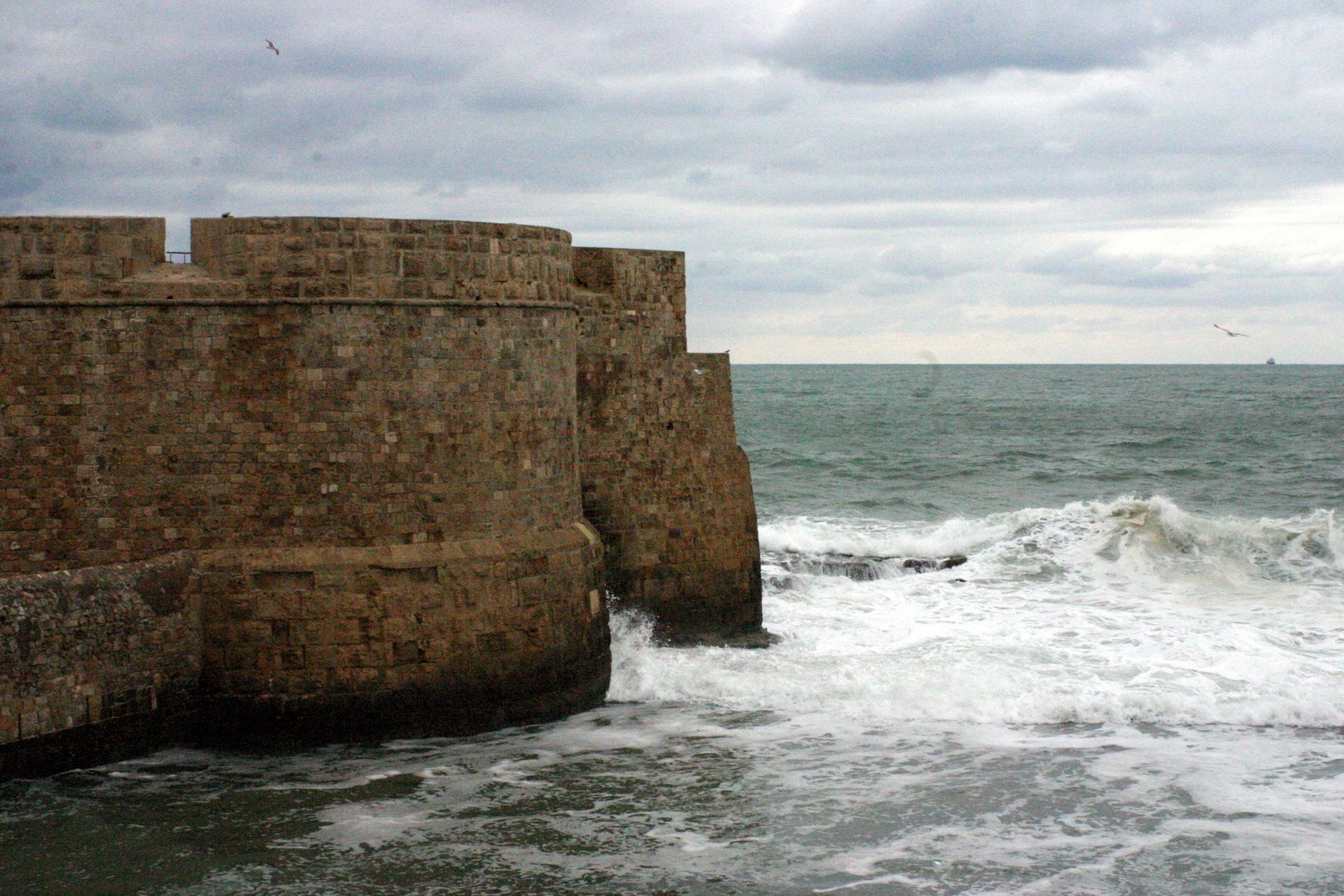
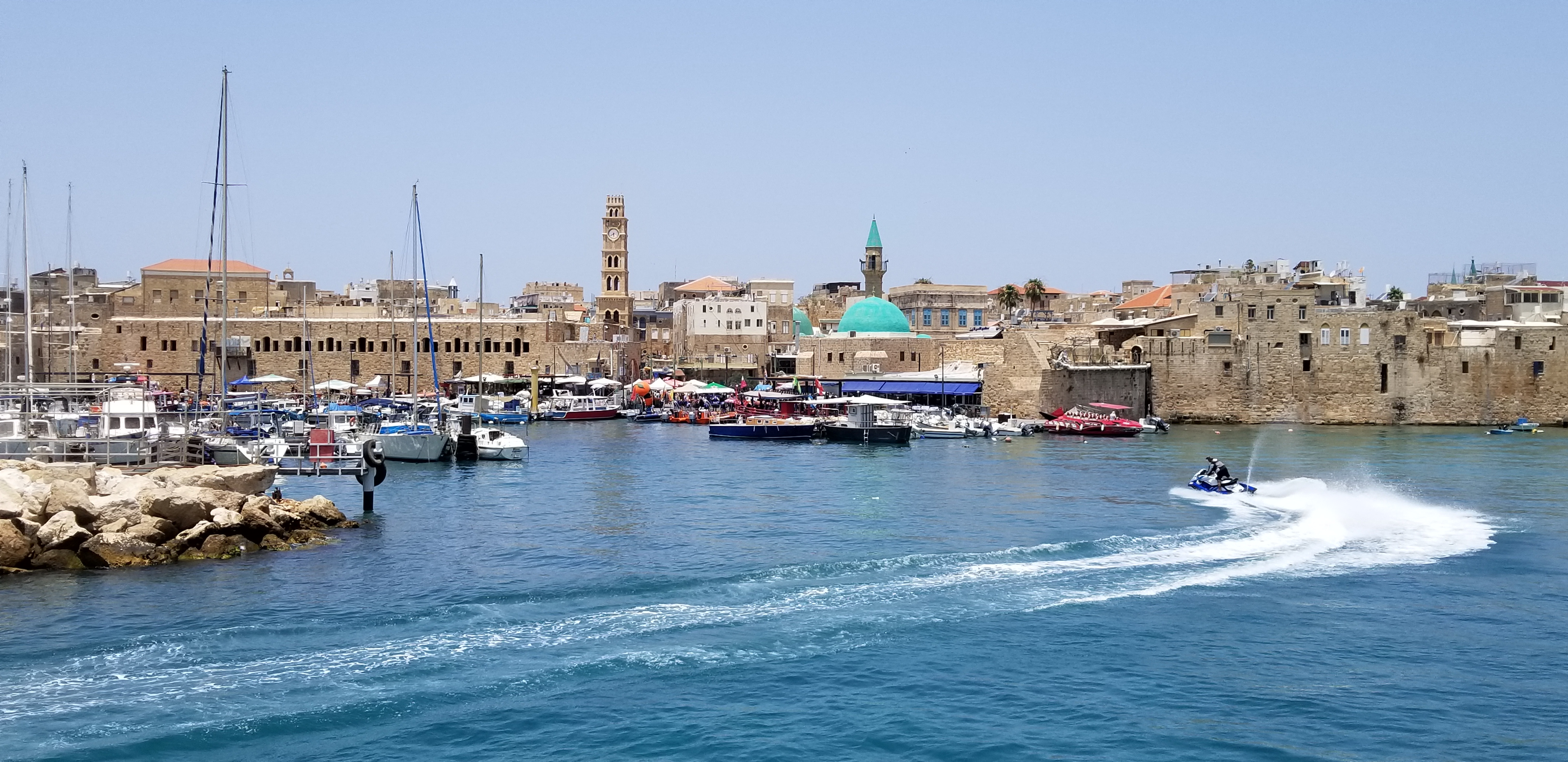
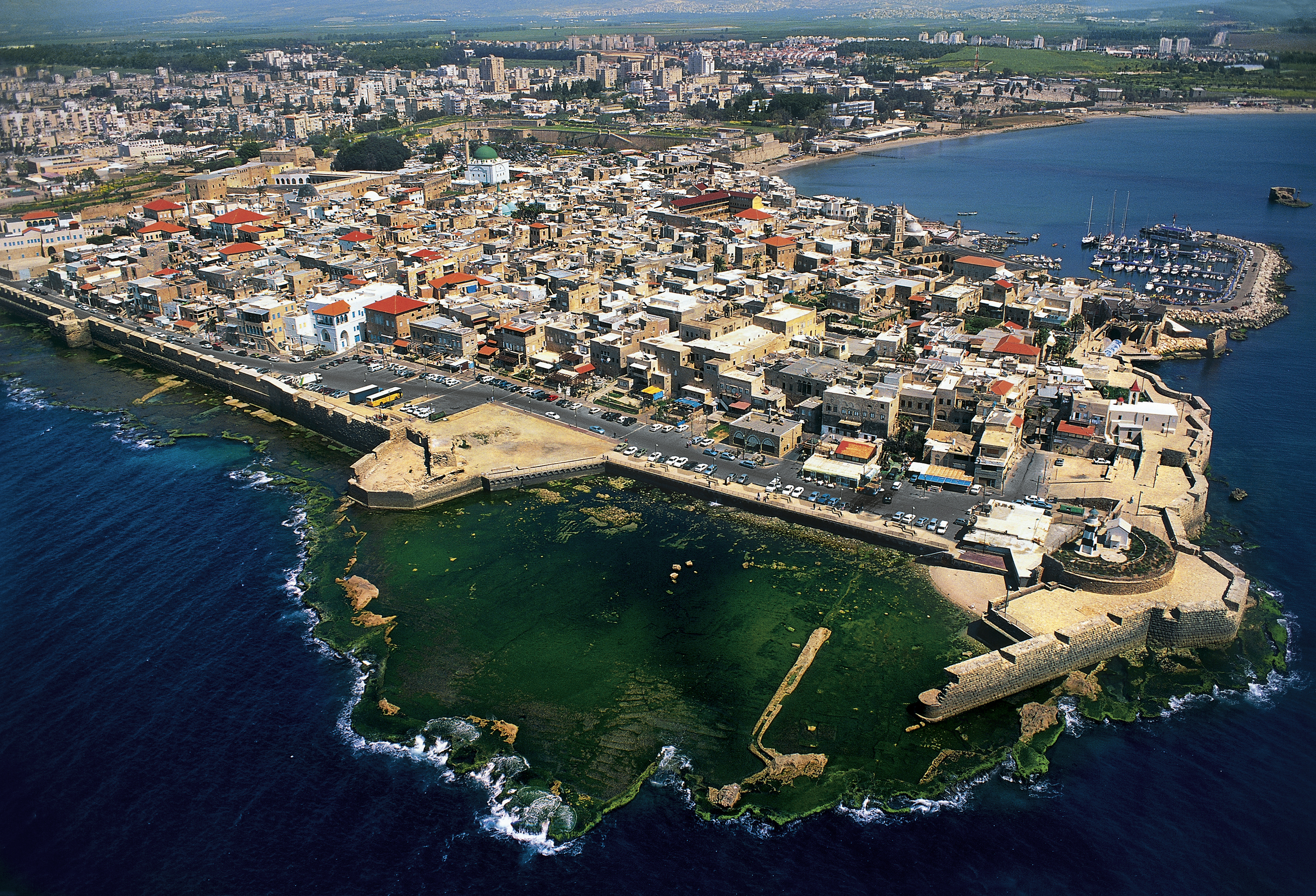
- The Old City of Acre

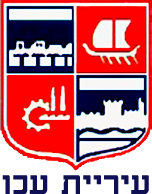
- Municipal emblem

- Location within Northwest Israel Location within Israel
- Coordinates: 32°55′40″N 35°04′54″E
- Grid position: 156/258 PAL
- Country: Israel
- District: Northern
- Subdistrict: Acre
- Natural Region: Acre
- Founded: 3000 BC (Bronze Age settlement); 1550 BC (Canaanite settlement); 1104 (Crusader rule); 1291 (Mamluk rule); 1948 (Israeli city)

Government
  - Mayor: Amihai Ben Shlush (since 2024)

Area
  - Total: 13,533 dunams (13.533 km^{2}; 5.225 sq mi)

Population (2024)
  - Total: 52,885
  - Density: 3,907.9/km^{2} (10,121/sq mi)

Ethnicity
  - Jews and others: 67.6%
  - Arabs: 32.4%

UNESCO World Heritage Site
- Official name: Old City of Acre
- Criteria: Cultural: ii, iii, v
- Reference: 1042
- Inscription: 2001 (25th Session)
- Area: 63.3 ha (156 acres)
- Buffer zone: 22.99 ha (56.8 acres)

Acre (/ˈɑːkər, ˈeɪkər/ AH-kər, AY-kər), known in Hebrew as Akko (Hebrew: עַכּוֹ, ʻAkkō, IPA: [ˈako]) and in Arabic as Akka (Arabic: عكّا, ʻAkkā, IPA: [ˈʕak.ka]), is a city in the coastal plain region of the Northern District of Israel.

The city occupies a strategic location, sitting in a natural harbour at the extremity of Haifa Bay on the coast of the Mediterranean's Levantine Sea. Aside from coastal trading, it was an important waypoint on the region's coastal road and the road cutting inland along the Jezreel Valley. The first settlement during the Early Bronze Age was abandoned after a few centuries, but a large town was established during the Middle Bronze Age. Continuously inhabited since then, it is among the oldest continuously inhabited settlements on Earth. It has, however, been subject to conquest and destruction several times and survived as little more than a large village for centuries at a time.

Acre was a hugely important city during the Crusades as a maritime foothold on the Mediterranean coast of the southern Levant and was the site of several battles, including the 1189–1191 Siege of Acre and 1291 Siege of Acre. It was the last stronghold of the Crusaders in the Holy Land prior to that final battle in 1291. At the end of Crusader rule, the city was destroyed by the Mamluks, thereafter existing as a modest fishing village until the rule of Daher al-Umar in the 18th century.

In 1947, Acre formed part of Mandatory Palestine and had a population of 13,665, of whom 10,930 were Muslim and 2,490 were Christian, and 105 were Jewish. As a result of the United Nations Partition Plan for Palestine and subsequent 1948 Arab–Israeli war, the population of the town dramatically changed as its Palestinian-Arab population was expelled or forced to flee; it was then resettled by Jewish immigrants. In present-day Israel, the population was 52,885 in 2024, made up of Jews, Muslims, Christians, Druze, and Baháʼís. In particular, Acre is the holiest city of the Baháʼí Faith in Israel and receives many pilgrims of that faith every year. Acre is one of Israel's mixed cities; 32% of the city's population is Arab. The Old City of Acre is a UNESCO World Heritage Site.

== Names ==
The ultimate etymology of the name is unknown, but appears to be Northwest Semitic. Acre is first recorded in Egyptian hieroglyphs in the execration texts c. 1800 BC by the name ʿky, reconstructed by Anson F. Rainey as *ʿ-k-ya > *ʿAkkâ-ya. The Amarna letters also mention an Akka in the mid-14th century BC, and Shmuel Aḥituv gives the Canaanite form as *ʿAkā.

The Akkadian form Akku appears in the 7th century, and the name עַכּוֹ ʻAkkō is given in the Hebrew Bible. This long ā to long ō transition has been interpreted as evidence of the Canaanite shift. It was, however, not universally applied, as several scholars note the final ā form persisted well into the first half of the 1st millennium CE, and a Jewish Palestinian Aramaic form עכה with a final long ā was also extant.

Acre was known to the Greeks as Ákē (Ancient Greek: Ἄκη), a homonym for a Greek word meaning "cure". Greek legend then offered a folk etymology that Hercules had found curative herbs at the site after one of his many fights. This name was Latinized as Ace or Acce (used by Pliny).

Under the Diadochi, the Ptolemaic Kingdom renamed the city Ptolemaïs and the Seleucid Empire called it Antioch. As both names were shared by a great many other towns, they were variously distinguished. The Syrians called it "Antioch in Ptolemais" (Ἀντιόχεια τῆς ἐν Πτολεμαΐδι, in Greek Antiókheia tês en Ptolemaΐdi).

Under Claudius, it was also briefly known as Germanicia in Ptolemais (Γερμανίκεια τῆς ἐν Πτολεμαΐδι, in Greek, Germaníkeia tês en Ptolemaΐdi). As a Roman colony, it was notionally refounded and renamed Colonia Claudii Caesaris Ptolemais or Colonia Claudia Felix Ptolemais Garmanica Stabilis after its imperial sponsor Claudius; it was known as Colonia Ptolemais for short.

Acre's original West Semitic place name is preserved in the Arabic form Akka (عكا), and was revived as the city's official name again following the Muslim conquest of Syria, as one of the cities of Jund al-Urdunn.

It was in the Crusader States' Kingdom of Jerusalem that the 'r' was inserted into its Latin name, becoming Acre. The name Saint-Jean-d'Acre (Modern French: Saint-Jean-d'Acre [sɛ̃ ʒɑ̃ dakʁ]), used for the Knights Hospitaller's headquarters in the city, came to be used for the city itself during this period. This name remained quite popular in the Christian world until modern times, often translated into the language being used: Saint John of Acre (in English), San Juan de Acre (in Spanish), Sant Joan d'Acre (in Catalan), San Giovanni d'Acri (in Italian), etc.

== History ==
Acre lies at the northern end of a wide bay with Mount Carmel at the south. It is the best natural roadstead on the southern Phoenician coast and has easy access to the Valley of Jezreel. It was settled early and has always been important for the fleets of kingdoms and empires contesting the area, serving as the main port for the entire southern Levant up to the modern era.

The ancient town was located atop Tel ʿAkkō (Hebrew) or Tell al-Fuḫḫār (Arabic, Tel el-Foukhar, meaning "tell of the clay/sherds"), 1.5 km (0.93 mi) east of the present city and 800 m (2,600 ft) north of the Na'aman River. In antiquity, however, it formed an easily protected peninsula directly beside the former mouth of the Na'aman or Belus.

=== Early Bronze Age ===
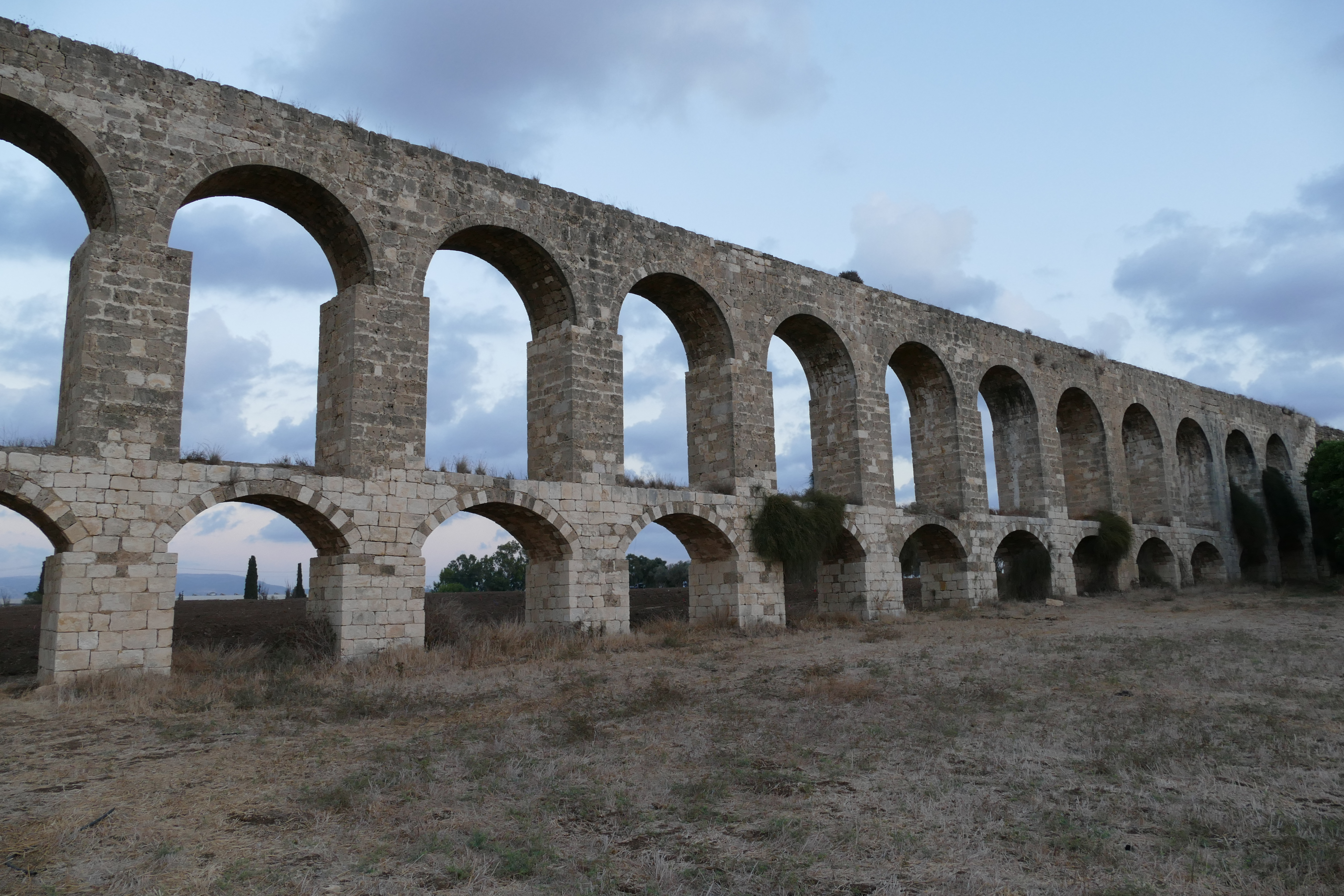
Ottoman aqueduct to Acre.

The earliest discovered settlement dates to around 3000 BC during the Early Bronze Age, but appears to have been abandoned after a few centuries, possibly because of inundation of its surrounding farmland by the Mediterranean.

=== Middle Bronze Age ===
Acre was resettled as an urban centre during the Middle Bronze Age (MBA, c. 2000–1550 BC) and has been continuously inhabited since then. Egyptian execration texts record one 18th-century ruler as Tūra-ʿAmmu (Tꜣʿmw). Further to the north was the important MBA site of Tel Kabri dominating the Akko plain.

=== Late Bronze Age ===
Acre was listed as "Aak" among the conquests of the Egyptian pharaoh Thutmose III.

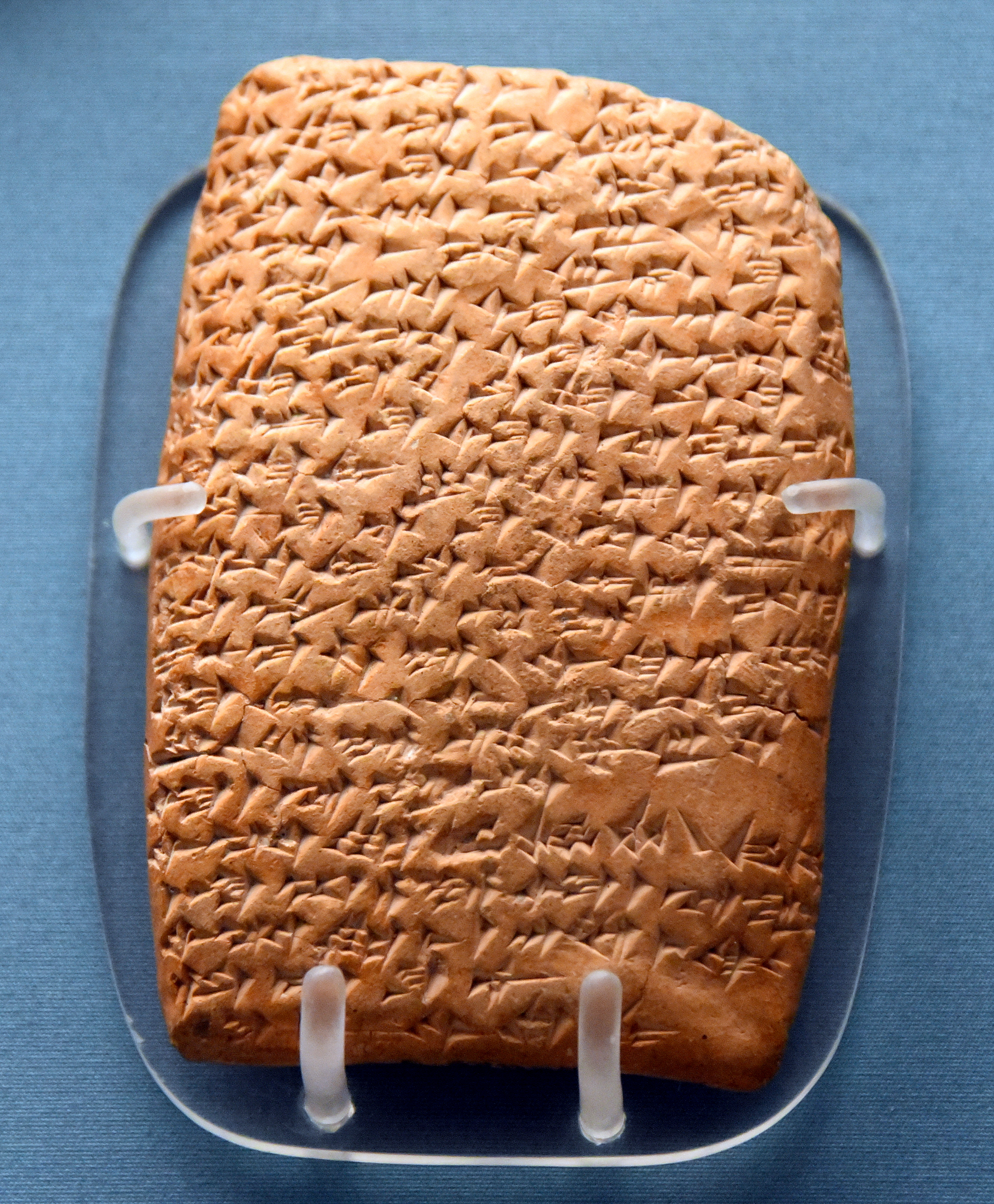
Biridiya's letter to Egypt complaining of the king of Acre's leniency towards a captured Hapiru leader.

In the Amarna Period (c. 1350 BC), there was turmoil in Egypt's Levantine provinces. The Amarna Archive contains letters concerning the ruler(s) of Acco. In one, King Biridiya of Megiddo complains to Amenhotep III or Akhenaten about the king of Acre, whom he accuses of treason for releasing the captured Hapiru king Labaya of Shechem instead of delivering him to Egypt. Excavations of Tel ʿAkkō have shown that this period of Acre involved industrial production of pottery, metal, and other trade goods.

=== Iron Age ===
Acre continued as a Phoenician city and was referenced as a Phoenician city by the Assyrians. Josephus, however, claimed it as a province of the Kingdom of Israel under Solomon.

Around 725 BC, Acre joined Sidon and Tyre in a revolt against the Neo-Assyrian emperor Shalmaneser V. There is a clear destruction layer in the ruins, probably dating to the 7th century BC.

=== Classical Age ===
==== Persian period ====
Acre served as a major port of the Persian Empire, with Strabo noting its importance in campaigns against the Egyptians. According to Strabo and Diodorus Siculus, Cambyses II attacked Egypt after massing a huge army on the plains near the city of Acre. The Persians expanded the town westward and probably improved its harbor and defenses. In December 2018, archaeologists digging at the site of Tell Keisan in Acre unearthed the remains of a Persian military outpost that might have played a role in the successful 525 BC Achaemenid invasion of Egypt. The city's industrial production continued into the late Persian era, with particularly expanded iron works.

==== Hellenistic period ====
The Persian-period fortifications at Tell Keisan were later heavily damaged during Alexander's fourth-century BC campaign to drive the Achaemenids out of the Levant.

After Alexander's death, his main generals divided his empire among themselves. At first, the Egyptian Ptolemies held the land around Acre. Ptolemy II renamed the city Ptolemais in his own and his father's honour in the 260s BC.

Antiochus III conquered the town for the Syrian Seleucids in 200 BC. In the late 170s or early 160s BC, Antiochus IV founded a Greek colony in the town, which he named Antioch after himself.

About 165 BC Judas Maccabeus defeated the Seleucids in several battles in Galilee, and drove them into Ptolemais. About 153 BC Alexander Balas, son of Antiochus IV Epiphanes, contesting the Seleucid crown with Demetrius, seized the city, which opened its gates to him. Demetrius offered many bribes to the Maccabees to obtain Jewish support against his rival, including the revenues of Ptolemais for the benefit of the Temple in Jerusalem, but in vain. Jonathan Apphus threw in his lot with Alexander; Alexander and Demetrius met in battle and the latter was killed. In 150 BC Alexander received Jonathan with great honour in Ptolemais. Some years later, however, Tryphon, an officer of the Seleucid Empire, who had grown suspicious of the Maccabees, enticed Jonathan into Ptolemais and there treacherously took him prisoner.

The city was captured by Alexander Jannaeus (ruled c. 103–76 BC), Tigranes the Great (r. 95–55 BC), and Cleopatra (r. 51–30 BC). Here Herod the Great (r. 37–4 BC) built a gymnasium.

=== Roman colony ===
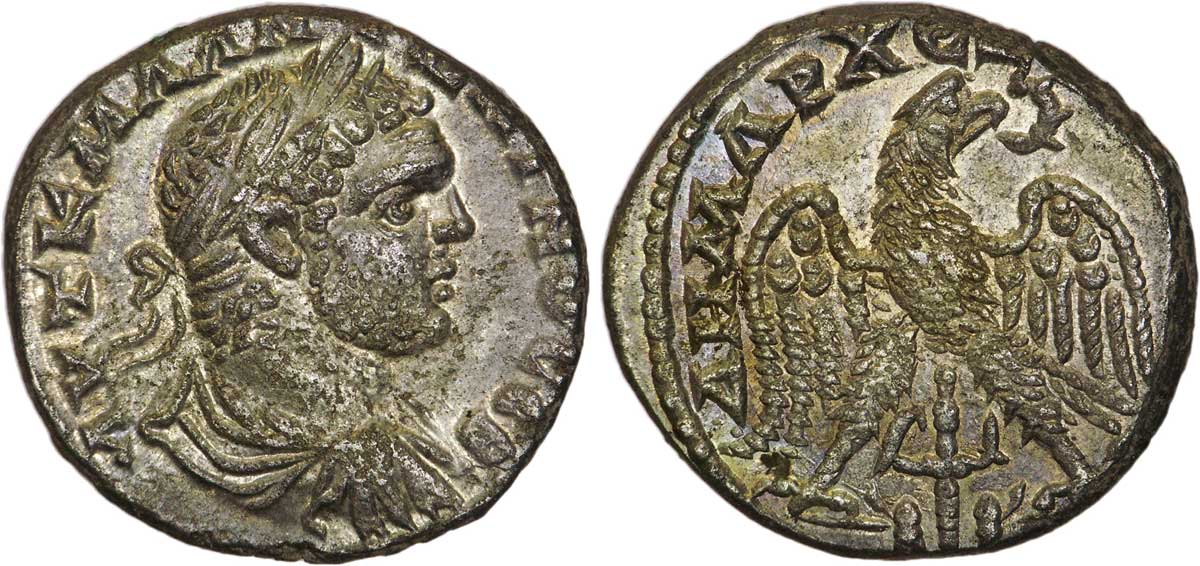
Roman coin minted at Ptolemais/Acre.

Around 37 BC, the Romans conquered the Hellenized Phoenician port-city called Akko. It became a colony in southern Roman Phoenicia, called Colonia Claudia Felix Ptolemais Garmanica Stabilis. Ptolemais stayed Roman for nearly seven centuries until 636 AD, when it was conquered by the Muslim Arabs. Under Augustus, a gymnasium was built in the city. In 4 BC, the Roman proconsul Publius Quinctilius Varus assembled his army there in order to suppress the revolts that broke out in the region following the death of Herod the Great.

The Romans built a breakwater and expanded the harbor at the present location of the harbor....In the Roman/Byzantine period, Acre-Ptolemais was an important port city. It minted its own coins, and its harbor was one of the main gates to the land. Through this port the Roman Legions came by ship to crush the Jewish revolt in 67AD. It also served was used as connections to the other ports (for example, Caesarea and Jaffa)....The port of Acre (Ptolemais) was a station on Paul's naval travel, as described in Acts of the Gospels (21, 6-7): "And when we had taken our leave one of another, we took ship; and they returned home again. And when we had finished our course from Tyre, we came to Ptolemais, and saluted the brethren, and abode with them one day".

During the rule of the emperor Claudius there was a building drive in Ptolemais and veterans of the legions settled here. The city was one of four colonies (with Berytus, Aelia Capitolina and Caesarea Maritima) created in the ancient Levant by Roman emperors for Roman veterans. During the Great Jewish Revolt (66–73 CE), Acre functioned as a staging point for both Cestius's and Vespasian's campaigns to suppress the revolt in Judaea.

The city was a center of Romanization in the region, but most of the population was made of local Phoenicians and Jews: as a consequence after the Hadrian times the descendants of the initial Roman colonists no longer spoke Latin and had become fully assimilated in less than two centuries (however the local society's customs were Roman). An important Roman colony (colonia) was established at the city that greatly increased the control of the region by the Romans over the next century with Roman colonists translated there from Italy. The Romans enlarged the port and the city grew to more than 20,000 inhabitants in the second century under emperor Hadrian. Ptolemais greatly flourished for two more centuries.

=== Byzantine period ===
After the permanent division of the Roman Empire in 395 AD, Ptolemais was administered by the successor state, the Byzantine Empire. The city started to lose importance and in the seventh century was reduced to a small settlement of less than one thousand inhabitants.

=== Early Islamic period ===
Following the defeat of the Byzantine army of Heraclius by the Rashidun army of Khalid ibn al-Walid in the Battle of Yarmouk, and the capitulation of the Christian city of Jerusalem to the Caliph Umar, Acre came under the rule of the Rashidun Caliphate beginning in 638. According to the early Muslim chronicler al-Baladhuri, the actual conquest of Acre was led by Shurahbil ibn Hasana, and it likely surrendered without resistance. The Arab conquest brought a revival to the town of Acre, and it served as the main port of Palestine through the Umayyad and Abbasid Caliphates that followed, and through Crusader rule into the 13th century.

The first Umayyad caliph, Muawiyah I (r. 661–680), regarded the coastal towns of the Levant as strategically important. Thus, he strengthened Acre's fortifications and settled Persians from other parts of Muslim Syria to inhabit the city. From Acre, which became one of the region's most important dockyards along with Tyre, Mu'awiyah launched an attack against Byzantine-held Cyprus. The Byzantines assaulted the coastal cities in 669, prompting Mu'awiyah to assemble and send shipbuilders and carpenters to Acre.

The 9th-century historian Ahmad Ibn Yahya al-Baladhuri in his book Kitab Futuh al-Buldan, notes that both Akka and Sur (Tyre) were rebuilt by 'Abd al-Malik ibn-Marwan (r. 685-705) after having "fallen into ruins", presumably as a result of the Byzantine assaults. He also notes that when Syrian sheikhs came to reside in Akka and Sur and other cities along the coast of Syria, there were Arab troops and Greeks already there, who over time were joined by people from other regions too.

The city continued to serve as the principal naval base of Jund al-Urdunn ("Military District of Jordan") until the reign of Caliph Hisham ibn Abd al-Malik (723–743), who moved the bulk of the shipyards north to Tyre. In the early Abbasid period, Caliph al-Mutawakkil developed Acre into a major naval base in 861, equipping the city with battleships and combat troops. The Palestinian Jerusalemite geographer Al-Maqdisi (c. 945-991) writes of Akka that it was unforitifed, unlike Sur/Tyre, until fortifications were built by the autonomous Emir Ibn Tulun of Egypt, who annexed the city in the 870s, and provided relative safety for merchant ships arriving at the city's port.

During the 10th century, Acre was still part of Jund al-Urdunn, whose capital was at Tabariyya. Al-Maqdisi visited Akka during the rule of the early Fatimid Caliphate in 985, describing a fortified coastal city with a large mosque possessing a substantial olive grove. When Persian traveller Nasir Khusraw visited Acre in 1047, he noted that the city was partially located on an elevation along the sea coast, citing the proclivity of inhabitants of the area to build along the sea only where there was higher ground, in fear of the waves encroachment. He also described the large El-Jazzar Mosque, built of marble, located in the centre of the city, where just south of it lay the "tomb of the Prophet Salih." Khusraw provided a description of the city's size, which roughly translated as having a length of 1.24 kilometres (0.77 miles) and a width of 300 metres (984 feet). This figure indicates that Acre at that time was larger than its current Old City area, most of which was built between the 18th and 19th centuries.

=== Crusader and Ayyubid period ===
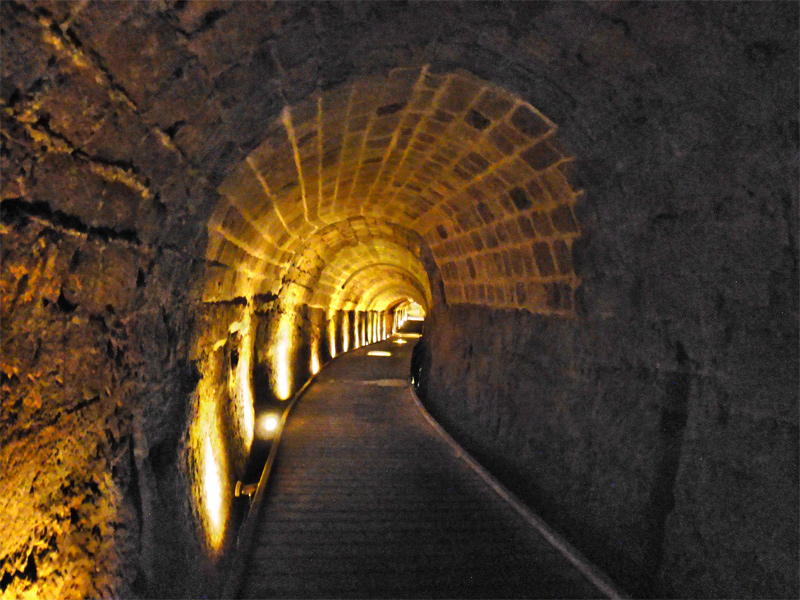
The Templar Tunnel.

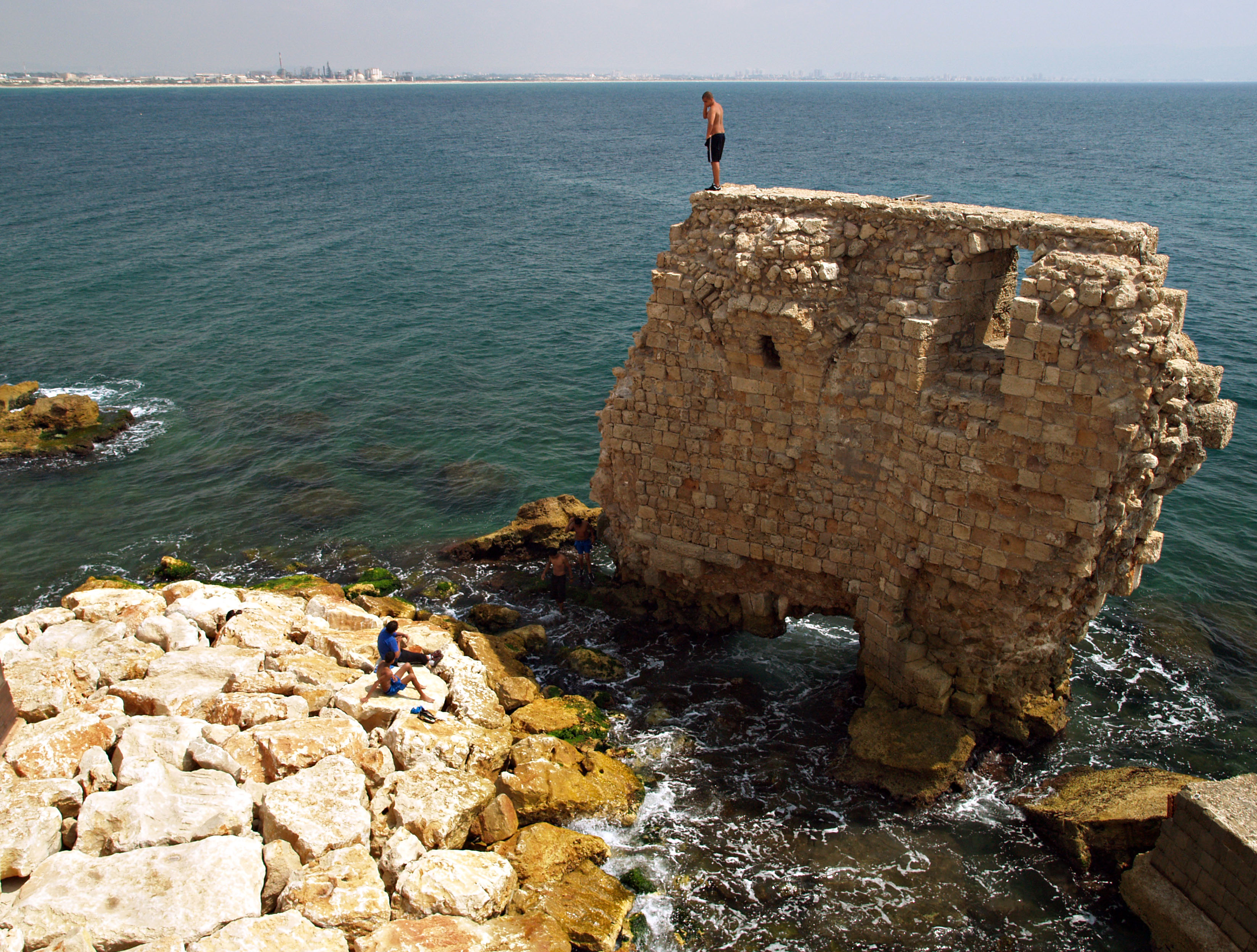
Remains of the Crusader-period Pisan Harbour.

After four years, the siege of Acre was successfully completed in 1104, with the city capitulating to the forces of King Baldwin I of Jerusalem following the First Crusade. The Crusaders made the town their chief port in the Kingdom of Jerusalem. On the first Crusade, Fulcher relates his travels with the Crusading armies of King Baldwin, including initially staying over in Acre before the army's advance to Jerusalem. This demonstrates that even from the beginning, Acre was an important link between the Crusaders and their advance into the Levant. Its function was to provide Crusaders with a foothold in the region and access to vibrant trade that made them prosperous, especially giving them access to the Asiatic spice trade. By the 1130s it had a population of around 25,000 and was only matched for size in the Crusader kingdom by the city of Jerusalem. Around 1170 it became the main port of the eastern Mediterranean, and the kingdom of Jerusalem was regarded in the west as enormously wealthy above all because of Acre. According to an English contemporary, it provided more for the Crusader crown than the total revenues of the king of England.

In the late 12th century, Jewish explorer Benjamin of Tudela recorded around 200 Jewish families in Acre. Its commercial prominence under Crusader rule seems to have attracted Jewish immigrants, including scholars from Europe. By the late 13th century, sources suggest that the Jewish community in Acre may have accumulated enough wealth to own slaves. Jewish migrants from Acre who settled in Fatimid Egypt continued to identify themselves for generations as the "people of Acco."

The Andalusian geographer Ibn Jubayr wrote that in 1185 there was still a Muslim community in the city who worshipped in a small mosque. Acre, along with Beirut and Sidon, capitulated without a fight to the Ayyubid sultan Saladin in 1187, after his decisive victory at Hattin and the subsequent Muslim capture of Jerusalem.

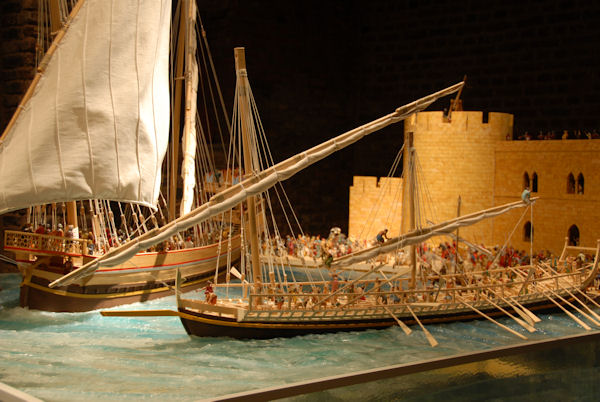
Model of Crusader ships anchored in Akko harbor in 1270 by the ICRS.

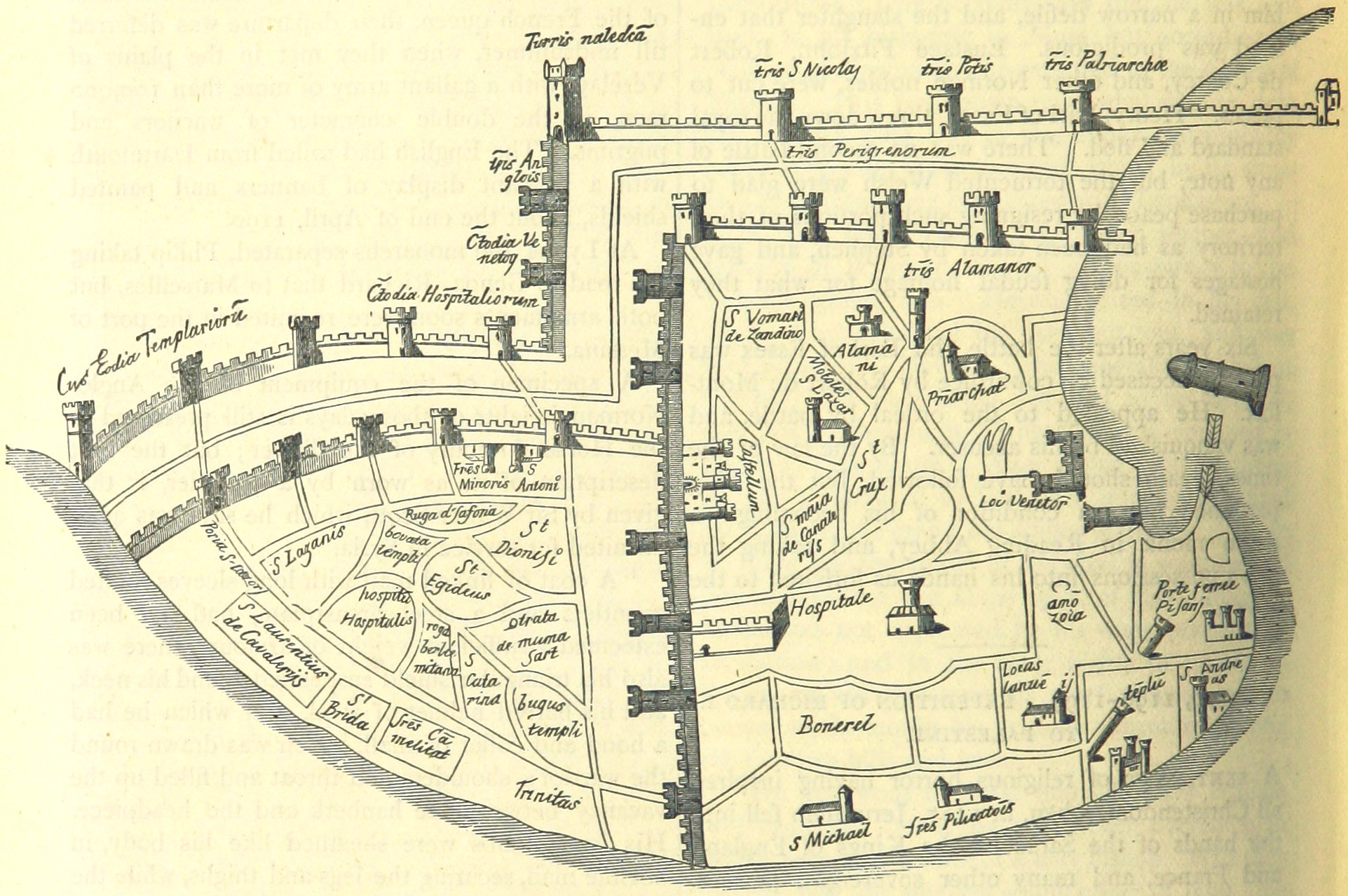
Copy of a 1320 map of Acre depicting the layout and fortifications of the city prior to the 1291 siege.

Acre remained in Muslim hands until it was unexpectedly besieged by King Guy of Lusignan—reinforced by Pisan naval and ground forces—in August 1189. The siege was unique in the history of the Crusades since the Frankish besiegers were themselves besieged, by Saladin's troops. It was not captured until July 1191 when the forces of the Third Crusade, led by King Richard I of England and King Philip II of France, came to King Guy's aid. Acre then served as the de facto capital of the remnant Kingdom of Jerusalem in 1192. During the siege, German merchants from Lübeck and Bremen had founded a field hospital, which became the nucleus of the chivalric Teutonic Order. Upon the Sixth Crusade, the city was placed under the administration of the Knights Hospitaller military order. Acre continued to prosper as major commercial hub of the eastern Mediterranean, but also underwent turbulent times due to the bitter infighting among the Crusader factions that occasionally resulted in civil wars.

In 1232, as a result of the inter-Christian War of the Lombards between the local barons and Emperor Frederick II, Acre organised itself as a commune under the mayorship of John of Ibelin. The old part of the city, where the port and fortified city were located, protrudes from the coastline, exposing both sides of the narrow piece of land to the sea. This could maximize its efficiency as a port, and the narrow entrance to this protrusion served as a natural and easy defense to the city. Both the archaeological record and Crusader texts emphasize Acre's strategic importance—a city in which it was crucial to pass through, control, and, as evidenced by the massive walls, protect.

Acre was the final major stronghold of the Crusader states when much of the Levantine coastline was conquered by Mamluk forces. Acre itself fell to Sultan Al-Ashraf Khalil in 1291.

=== Mamluk period ===
Acre, having been isolated and largely abandoned by Europe, was conquered by Mamluk sultan al-Ashraf Khalil in a bloody siege in 1291. In line with Mamluk policy regarding the coastal cities (to prevent their future utilization by Crusader forces), Acre was entirely destroyed, with the exception of a few religious edifices considered sacred by the Muslims, namely the Nabi Salih tomb and the Ayn Bakar spring. The destruction of the city led to popular Arabic sayings in the region enshrining its past glory.

In 1321 the Syrian geographer Abu'l-Fida wrote that Acre was "a beautiful city" but still in ruins following its capture by the Mamluks. Nonetheless, the "spacious" port was still in use and the city was full of artisans. Throughout the Mamluk era (1260–1517), Acre was succeeded by Safed as the principal city of its province.

=== Ottoman period ===
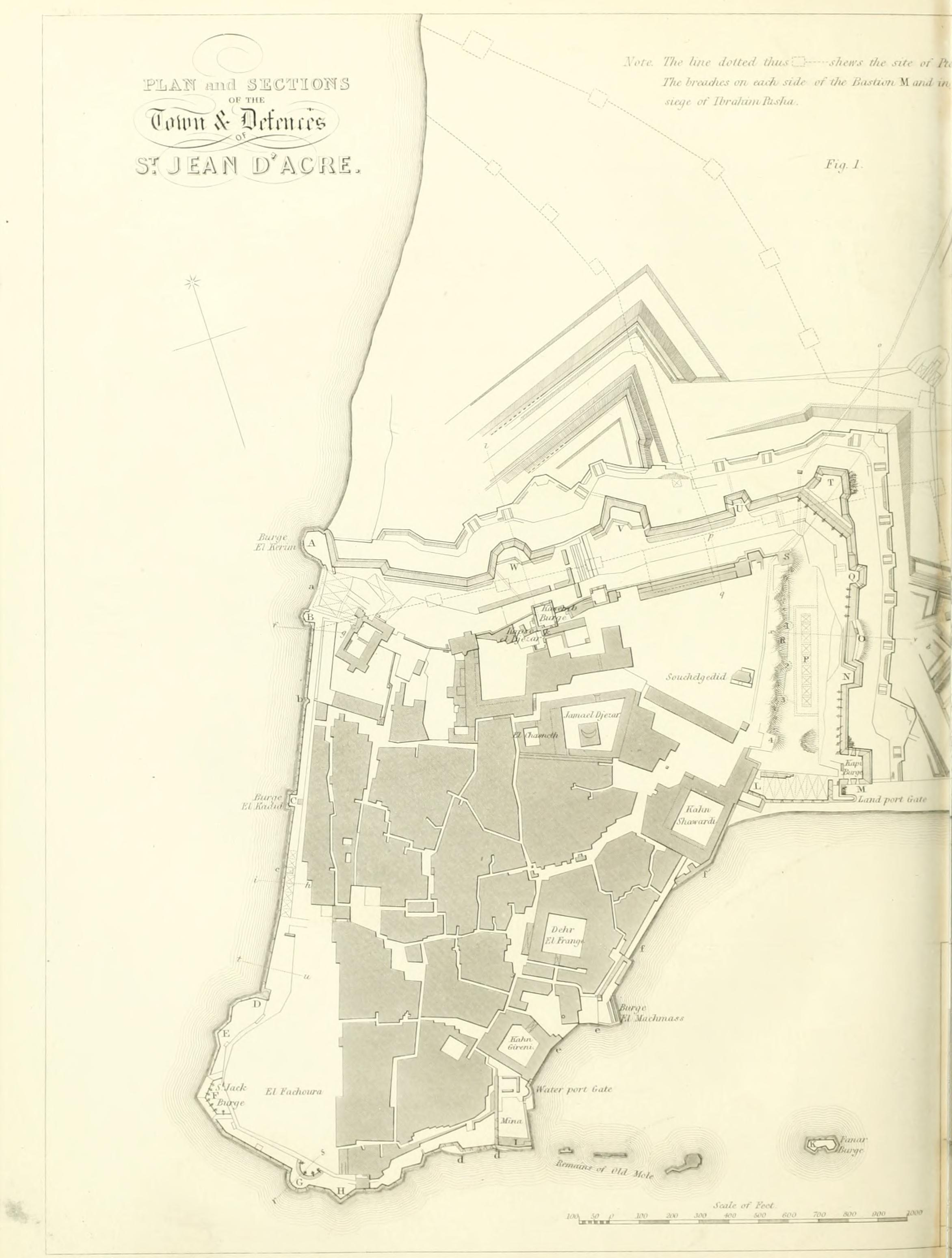
Acre in 1841, as mapped by the British Royal Engineers after the Oriental Crisis of 1840.

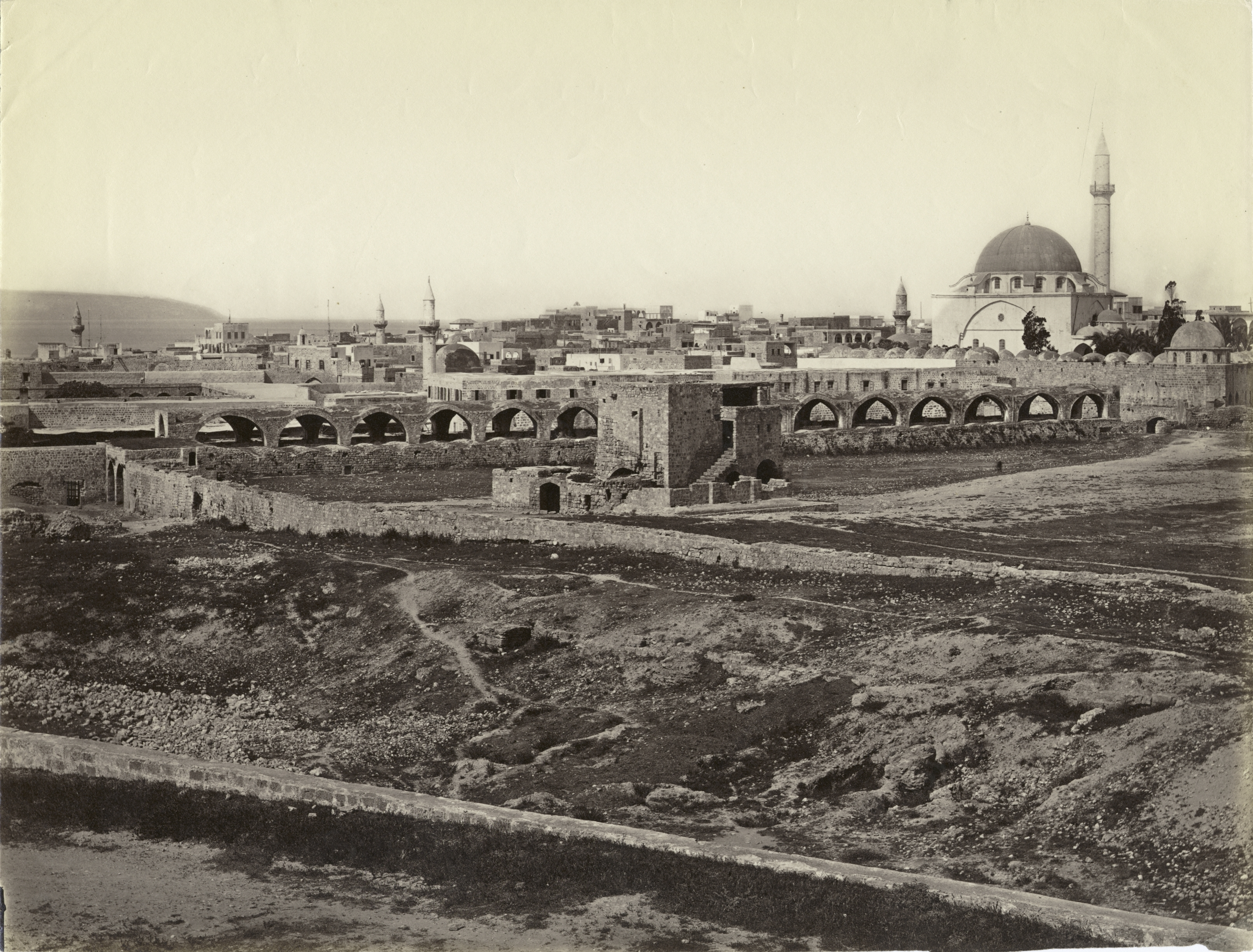
Old City of Acre, 1878 by Félix Bonfils.

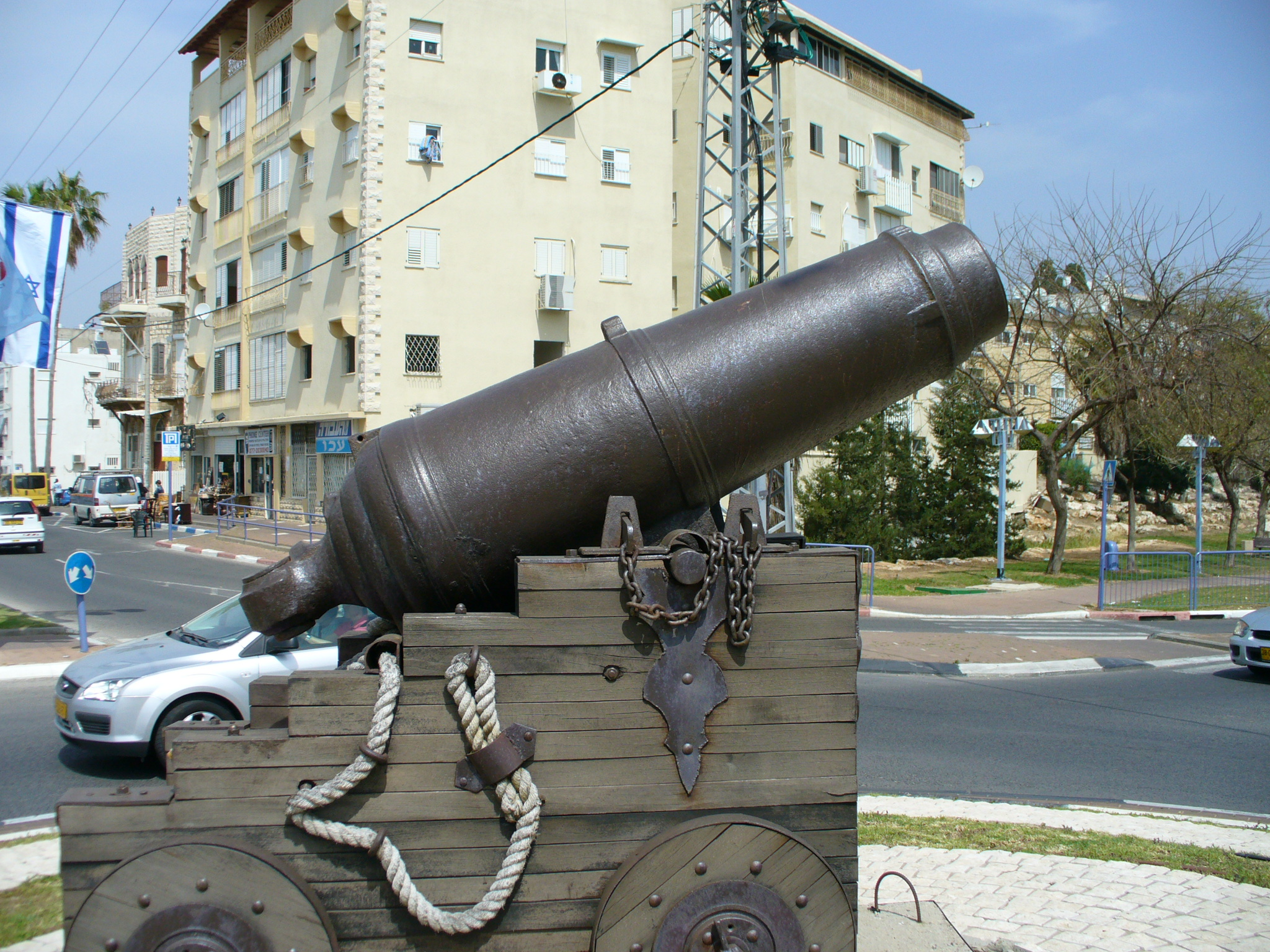
Carronade near the Old City.

Incorporated into the Ottoman Empire in 1517, it appeared in the census of 1596, located in the Nahiya of Acca of the Liwa of Safad. The population was 81 households and 15 bachelors, all Muslim. They paid a fixed tax-rate of 25% on agricultural products, including wheat, barley, cotton, goats, and beehives, water buffaloes, in addition to occasional revenues and market toll, a total of 20,500 Akçe. Half of the revenue went to a Waqf. English academic Henry Maundrell in 1697 found it a ruin, save for a khan (caravanserai) built and occupied by French merchants for their use, a mosque and a few poor cottages. The khan was named Khan al-Ilfranj after its French founders.

During Ottoman rule, Acre continued to play an important role in the region via smaller autonomous sheikhdoms. Towards the end of the 18th century Acre revived under the rule of Daher al-Umar, the Arab ruler of the Galilee, who made the city capital of his autonomous sheikhdom. Daher rebuilt Acre's fortifications, using materials from the city's medieval ruins. He died outside its walls during an offensive against him by the Ottoman state in 1775.

Umar's successor, Jazzar Pasha, further fortified its walls when he virtually moved the capital of the Saida Eyelet ("Province of Sidon") to Acre where he resided. Jazzar's improvements were accomplished through heavy imposts secured for himself all the benefits derived from his improvements. About 1780, Jazzar peremptorily banished the French trading colony, in spite of protests from the French government, and refused to receive a consul. Both Daher and Jazzar undertook ambitious architectural projects in the city, building several caravanserais, mosques, public baths and other structures. Some of the notable works included the Al-Jazzar Mosque, which was built out of stones from the ancient ruins of Caesarea and Atlit and the Khan al-Umdan, both built on Jazzar's orders. Under Jazzar, Acre thrived, becoming the third largest city in Ottoman Syria. Its population, then largely composed of migrants drawn by its burgeoning development, is estimated at twenty thousand.

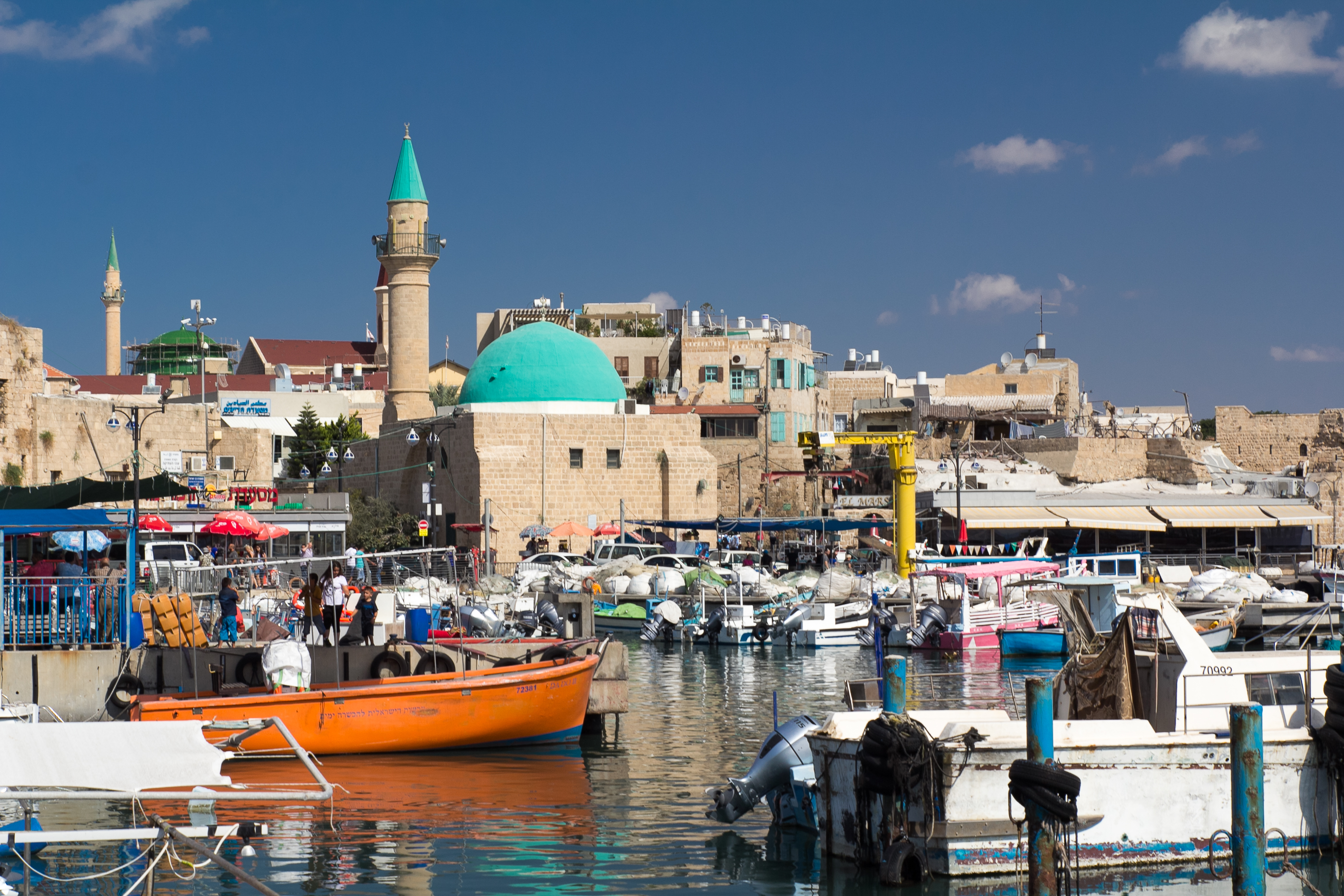
Port of Acre.

In 1799 Napoleon, in pursuance of his scheme for raising a Syrian rebellion against Turkish domination, appeared before Acre, but after a siege of two months (March–May) was repulsed by the Turks, aided by Sir Sidney Smith and a force of British sailors. Having lost his siege cannons to Smith, Napoleon attempted to lay siege to the walled city defended by Ottoman troops on 20 March 1799, using only his infantry and small-calibre cannons, a strategy which failed, leading to his retreat two months later on 21 May.

Jazzar was succeeded on his death by his mamluk, Sulayman Pasha al-Adil, under whose milder rule the town advanced in prosperity till his death in 1819. After his death, Haim Farhi, who was his adviser, paid a huge sum in bribes to assure that Abdullah Pasha (son of Ali Pasha, the deputy of Sulayman Pasha), whom he had known from youth, will be appointed as ruler—which didn't stop the new ruler from assassinating Farhi. Abdullah Pasha ruled Acre until 1831, when Ibrahim Pasha besieged and reduced the town and destroyed its buildings. During the Oriental Crisis of 1840, the city was bombarded on 4 November 1840 by the allied British, Austrian, and French squadrons, and, in the following year, it was restored to Turkish rule. It regained some of its former prosperity after linking with the Hejaz Railway by a branch line from Haifa in 1913. According to the Ottoman population statistics of 1914, Akka had a total population of 40,852 people, consisting of 31,800 Muslims, 4,316 Catholic Greeks, 3,959 Orthodox Greeks, 332 Protestants, 268 Latins, 106 Jews, 67 Maronites and 4 Armenians.

It was the capital of the Akka Sanjak in the Beirut Vilayet until the British captured the city on 23 September 1918 during World War I.

=== Mandatory Palestine ===
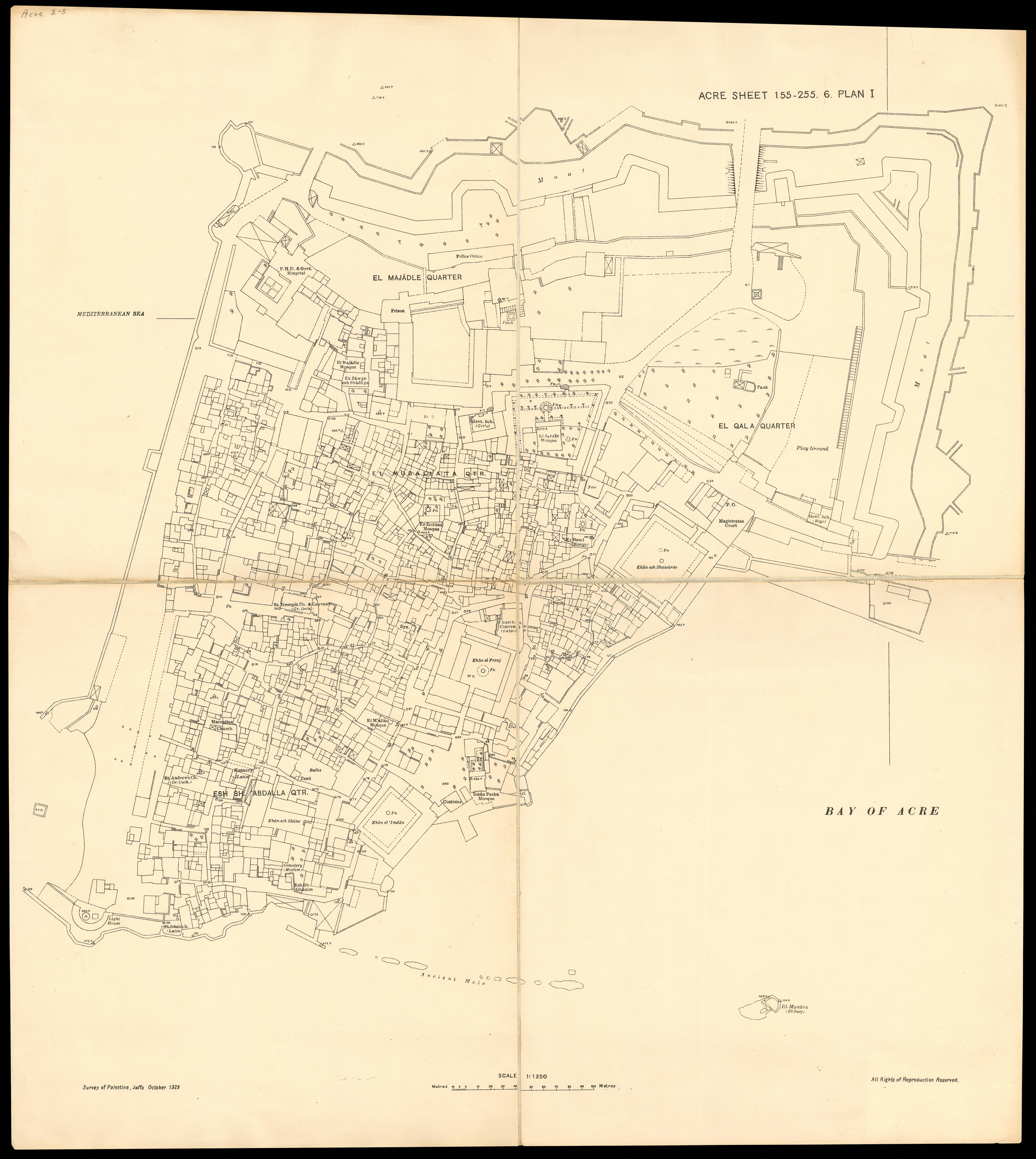
Detailed map of the Old City of Acre from 1929, showing all the individual buildings.

At the beginning of the Mandate period, in the 1922 census of Palestine, Acre had 6,420 residents: 4,883 of whom were Muslim; 1,344 Christian; 102 Baháʼí; 78 Jewish and 13 Druze. The 1931 census counted 7,897 people in Acre, 6,076 Muslims, 1,523 Christians, 237 Jews, 51 Baháʼí, and 10 Druze. In the 1945 census Acre's population numbered 12,360; 9,890 Muslims, 2,330 Christians, 50 Jews and 90 classified as "other".

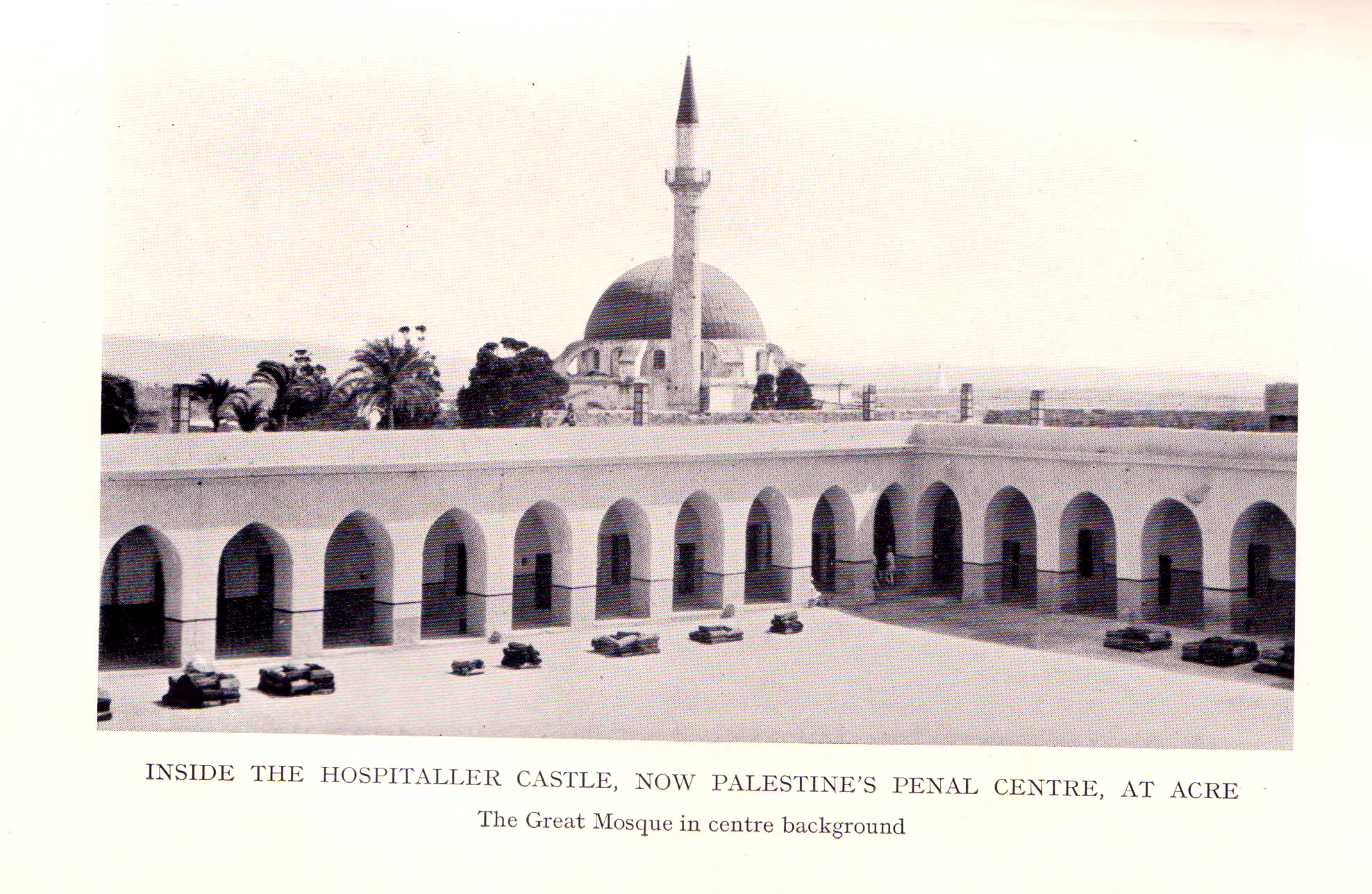
Interior of Acre prison, circa 1938.

Acre's fort was converted into a jail, where members of the Jewish underground were held during their struggle against the Mandate authorities, among them Ze'ev Jabotinsky, Shlomo Ben-Yosef, and Dov Gruner. Gruner and Ben-Yosef were executed there. Other Jewish inmates were freed by members of the Irgun, who broke into the jail on 4 May 1947 and succeeded in releasing Jewish underground movement activists. Over 200 Arab inmates also escaped.

=== 1948 Palestine War ===
In the 1947 United Nations Partition Plan for Palestine, Acre was designated part of a future Arab state. On 18 March, four technicians from the Palestine Electric Company and five British soldiers in their escort were killed while travelling to mend a cable in an RAF camp, when an Arab ambush exploded a mine on the route just outside the Moslem cemetery east of Acre. The Haganah responded by blowing up a bridge outside the city and derailing a train. Before the 1948 Arab–Israeli War broke out, the Carmeli Brigade's 21 Battalion commander had repeatedly damaged the Al-Kabri aqueduct that furnished Acre with water, and when Arab repairs managed to restore water supply, then resorted to pouring flasks of typhoid and dysentery bacteria into the aqueduct, as part of a biological warfare programme called Operation Cast Thy Bread. At some time in late April or early May 1948, Jewish forces cut the town's electricity supply responsible for pumping water, and a typhoid epidemic broke out. Israeli officials later credited the facility with which they conquered the town in part to the effects of the demoralization induced by the epidemic.

Israel's Carmeli forces attacked on May 16 and, after an ultimatum was delivered that, unless the inhabitants surrendered, 'we will destroy you to the last man and utterly,' the town notables signed an instrument of surrender on the night between 17 and 18 May 1948. Sixty (60) bodies were found and about three-quarters of the Arab population of the city (13,510 of 17,395) were displaced.

=== Israel ===
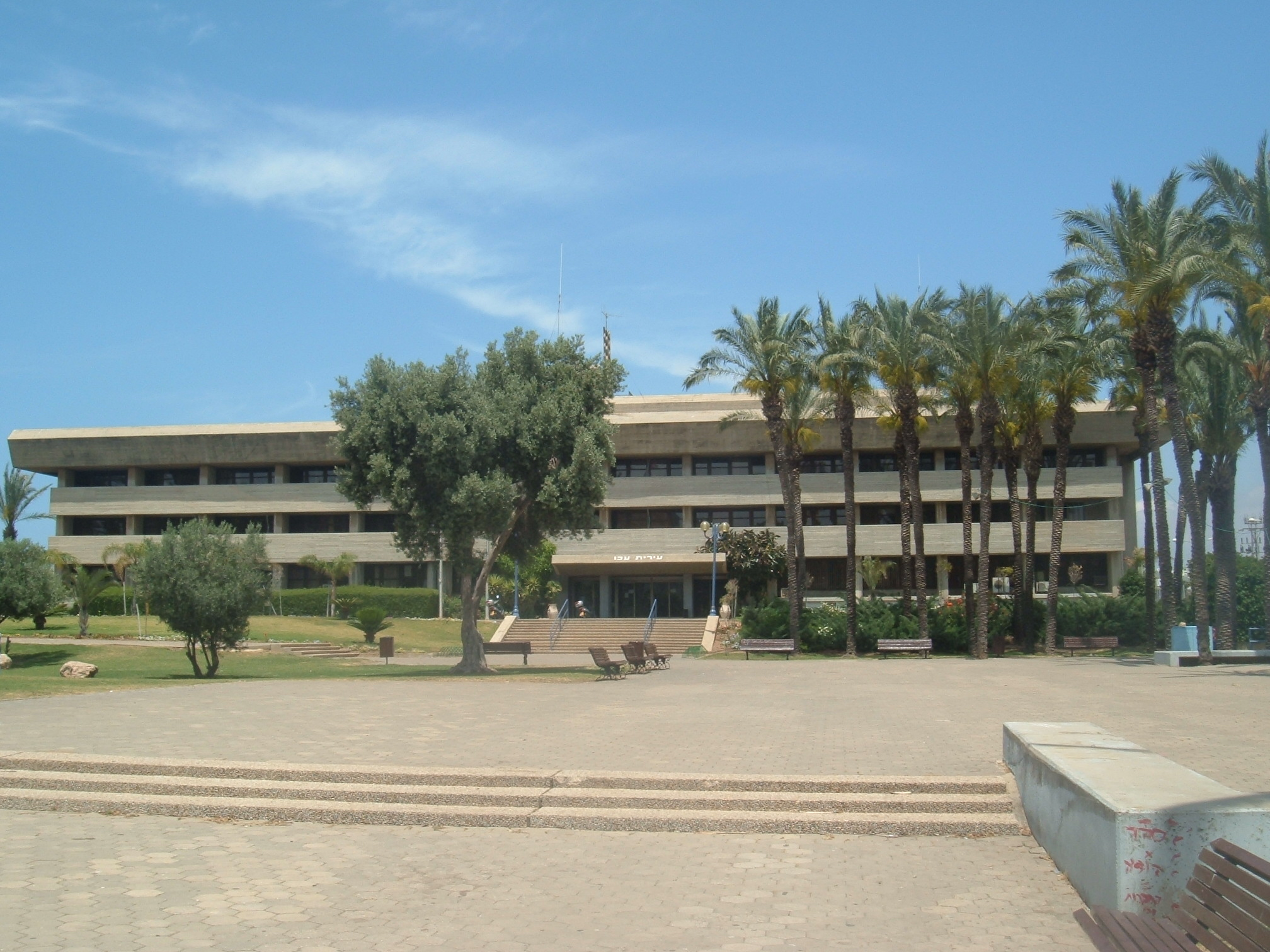
Acre city hall.

Throughout the 1950s, many Jewish neighbourhoods were established at the northern and eastern parts of the city, as it became a development town, designated to absorb numerous Jewish immigrants, largely Jews from Morocco. The first Jewish mayor of Akko was Baruch Noy. He devoted himself to organizing the municipal services and worked to improve the situation of new immigrants and Arab residents. To promote coexistence in the City, Noy encouraged Arabs to run for municipal council and instituted the practice of electing a deputy mayor from the Arab inhabitants. During his term, the first new neighborhoods were established, and the beginning of the development of Kfar Ata was laid.

Israeli martial law regime: Arab female residents of the city of Acre sitting on the steps of the military governor’s offices, August 1950

The old city of Akko remained largely Arab Muslim (including several Bedouin families), with an Arab Christian neighbourhood in close proximity. The city also attracted worshippers of the Baháʼí Faith, some of whom became permanent residents in the city, where the Baháʼí Mansion of Bahjí is located. Acre has also served as a base for important events in Baháʼí history, including being the birthplace of Shoghi Effendi, and the short-lived schism between Baháʼís initiated by the attacks by Mírzá Muhammad ʻAlí against ʻAbdu'l-Bahá. Baháʼís have since commemorated various events that have occurred in the city, including the imprisonment of Baháʼu'lláh.

In the 1990s, the city absorbed thousands of Jews who immigrated from the former Soviet Union. Within several years, however, the population balance between Jews and Arabs shifted backwards, as northern neighbourhoods were abandoned by many of its Jewish residents in favour of new housing projects in nearby Nahariya, while many Muslim Arabs moved in (largely coming from nearby Arab villages). Nevertheless, the city still has a clear Jewish majority; in 2011, the population of 46,000 included 30,000 Jews and 14,000 Arabs.

Ethnic tensions erupted in the city on 8 October 2008 after an Arab citizen drove through a predominantly Jewish neighbourhood during Yom Kippur, leading to five days of violence between Arabs and Jews.

In 2009, the population of Acre reached 46,300. In 2018 Shimon Lankri was re-elected mayor with 85% of the vote.

== Archaeology ==
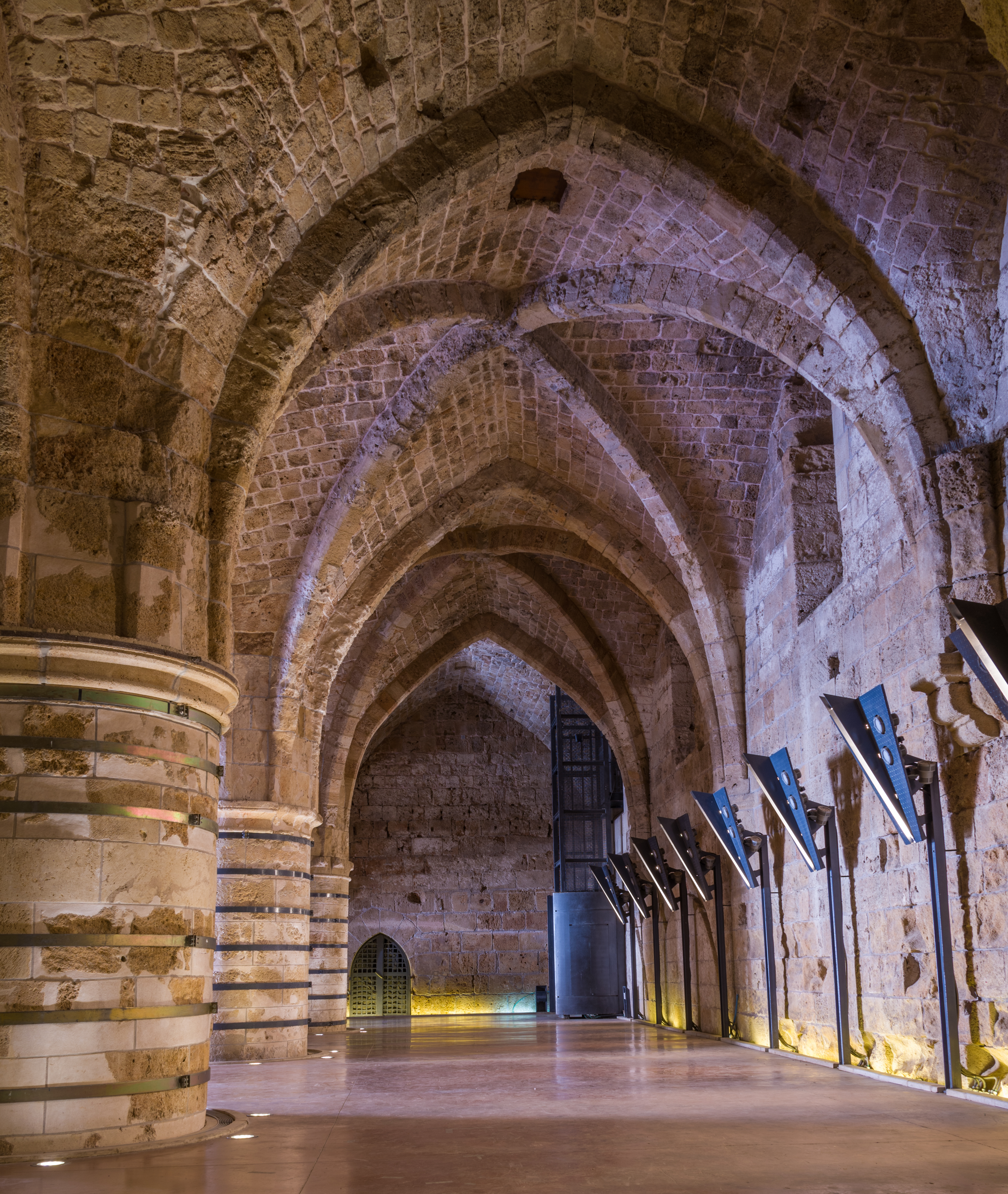
Refectory of the Hospitaller fortress.

Excavations at Tell Akko began in 1973. In 2012, archaeologists excavating at the foot of the city's southern seawall found a quay and other evidence of a 2,300-year old port. Mooring stones weighing 250–300 kilograms each were unearthed at the edge of a 5-meter long stone platform chiseled in Phoenician-style, thought to be an installation that helped raise military vessels from the water onto the shore.

=== Crusader period remains ===
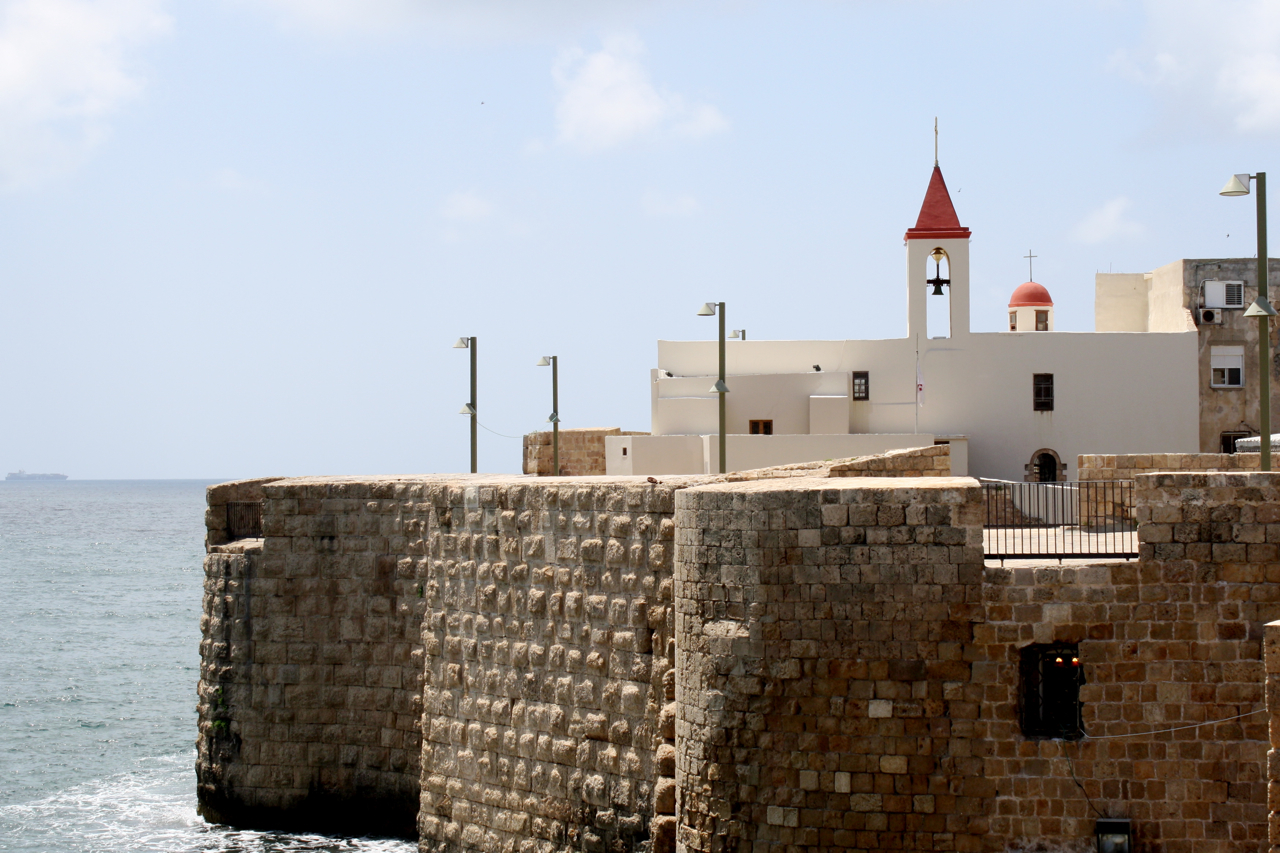
Saint John the Baptist Church.

Under the citadel and prison of Acre, archaeological excavations revealed a complex of halls, which was built and used by the Knights Hospitaller. The current city level is 8 meters above the Crusader era, placing the fortress deep underground. This complex was a part of the Hospitallers' citadel, which was combined in the northern wall of Acre. The complex includes six semi-joined halls, one recently excavated large hall, a dungeon, a refectory (dining hall) and remains of an ancient Gothic church. The fortress also comprises four wings surrounding an open Courtyard spanning 1,200 m². In the northern part is a 4-meter-deep well. Two plastered pools, likely for drinking water (northern) and washing (southern), are also present. The courtyard is surrounded by arches supporting stairs to an upper level. The northern wing, parallel to the city's northern walls, played a main defensive role, housing nine long halls across two floors used as warehouses and a rainwater reservoir fed from the fortress roof. These halls feature 10-meter-high barrel vaults, with external stone walls 3.5 meters thick. The Sugar Refinery Hall was a three-story building, with a large rainwater reservoir on the lower level comprising two connected 7.5-meter-high pools. The main hall above, 7 meters high, contained hundreds of clay vessels used for sugar production, giving the hall its name. Remnants of a tower, gate, and sewage channel remain on the northern side. The western wing, partially excavated, appears to have two floors with 30 residential rooms per level. One feature is the Columned Hall, a 10-meter-long dining hall with a ribbed vault supported by three 3-meter-diameter stone columns. The eastern wing includes unexcavated kitchen areas, while the Pillar Hall, a 35×40-meter chamber covering 1,400 m², has a cross-vaulted ceiling on square pillars, used for knightly meetings and ceremonies. The southern wing forms a city street with a stone gate, featuring rare Crusader heraldic symbols. A vaulted hall with three rounded columns lies nearby. A marked tourist route leads to the Hospitaller chapter house, a narrow corridor to the refectory or crypt, and steep stairs to a long, narrow passage of unknown purpose connecting to the Crusader hospital. Some underground areas are periodically closed for ongoing archaeological work.

Medieval European remains include the Church of Saint George and adjacent houses at the Genovese Square (Kikar ha-Genovezim or Kikar Genoa in Hebrew). There were also residential quarters and marketplaces run by merchants from Pisa and Amalfi in Crusader and medieval Acre.

In March 2017, marine archaeologists from Haifa University announced the discovery of the wreck of a crusader ship with treasure dating back to 1062–1250 AD. Excavators teams also unearthed ceramic bowls and jugs from places as Syria, Cyprus and southern Italy. The researchers thought the golden coins could be used as a bribe to boat owners in hopes of buying their escape. Robert Kool of the IAA identified these 30 coins as florins.

== Climate ==
Acre has a Mediterranean climate (Köppen: Csa).

Climate data for Acre (1991–2020)
Month	Jan	Feb	Mar	Apr	May	Jun	Jul	Aug	Sep	Oct	Nov	Dec	Year
Record high °C (°F)	25.9 (78.6)	29.2 (84.6)	36.8 (98.2)	40.3 (104.5)	42.0 (107.6)	44.0 (111.2)	39.9 (103.8)	34.6 (94.3)	40.5 (104.9)	39.9 (103.8)	34.5 (94.1)	29.6 (85.3)	44.0 (111.2)
Mean daily maximum °C (°F)	17.0 (62.6)	17.9 (64.2)	20.2 (68.4)	23.4 (74.1)	26.0 (78.8)	27.9 (82.2)	29.9 (85.8)	30.8 (87.4)	30.0 (86.0)	28.2 (82.8)	23.9 (75.0)	19.0 (66.2)	24.5 (76.1)
Daily mean °C (°F)	12.2 (54.0)	12.5 (54.5)	14.2 (57.6)	17.0 (62.6)	19.9 (67.8)	22.7 (72.9)	25.4 (77.7)	26.0 (78.8)	24.5 (76.1)	21.6 (70.9)	17.5 (63.5)	13.8 (56.8)	18.9 (66.0)
Mean daily minimum °C (°F)	7.3 (45.1)	7.1 (44.8)	8.2 (46.8)	10.6 (51.1)	13.7 (56.7)	17.4 (63.3)	20.8 (69.4)	21.2 (70.2)	18.9 (66.0)	15.0 (59.0)	11.1 (52.0)	8.6 (47.5)	13.3 (55.9)
Record low °C (°F)	−2.1 (28.2)	−4.0 (24.8)	−0.8 (30.6)	−0.3 (31.5)	5.0 (41.0)	8.6 (47.5)	12.8 (55.0)	13.7 (56.7)	9.5 (49.1)	5.5 (41.9)	−2.0 (28.4)	−2.6 (27.3)	−4.0 (24.8)
Average precipitation mm (inches)	162.9 (6.41)	102.0 (4.02)	53.7 (2.11)	24.4 (0.96)	7.4 (0.29)	0.4 (0.02)	0.1 (0.00)	0.0 (0.0)	2.5 (0.10)	27.2 (1.07)	76.5 (3.01)	133.9 (5.27)	591.0 (23.27)
Average precipitation days (≥ 1.0 mm)	11.2	9.3	6.1	2.9	1.2	0.1	0.1	0.0	0.5	2.7	5.5	10.0	49.6
Source: NOAA

== Demography ==
Historical population
Year	Pop.	±%
1972	33,500	—
1983	36,700	+9.6%
1995	44,200	+20.4%
2008	46,100	+4.3%
2022	50,555	+9.7%
2024	52,884	+4.6%

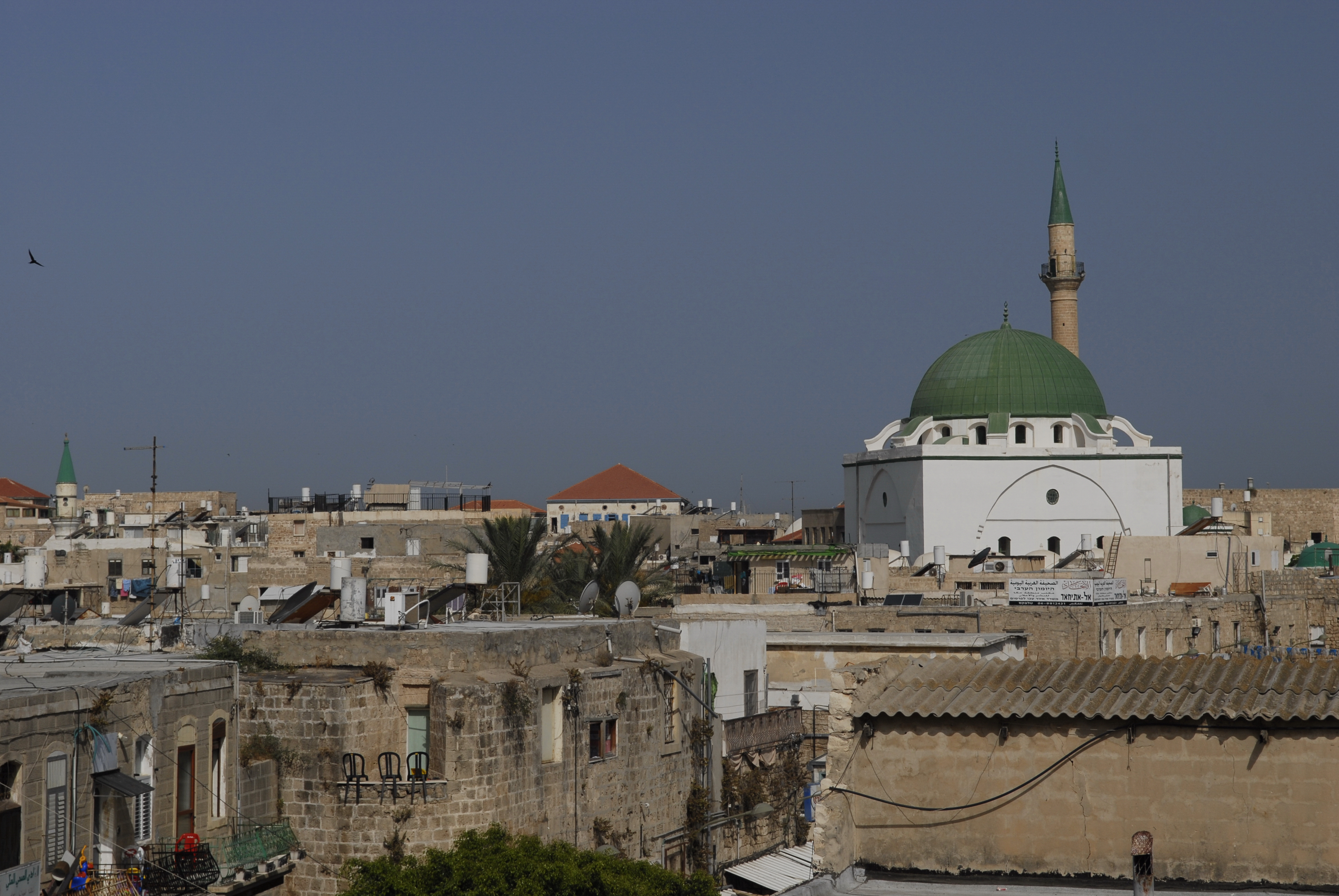
El-Jazzar Mosque, Muslims are the second largest population in Acre

Today there are roughly 48,000 people who live in Acre. Among Israeli cities, Acre has a relatively high proportion of non-Jewish residents, with 32% of the population being Arab. In 2000, 95% of the residents in the Old City were Arab. Only about 15% of the current Arab population in the city descends from families who lived there before 1948. In 2022, 56.5% of the population was Jewish, 29.5% was Muslim, 2.7% was Christian, 0.2% was Druze and 11.1% was counted as other.

Acre is also home to Baháʼís. It is the holiest city of the Baháʼí Faith and receives many pilgrims every year.

In 1999, there were 22 schools in Acre with an enrollment of 15,000 children.

== Transportation ==
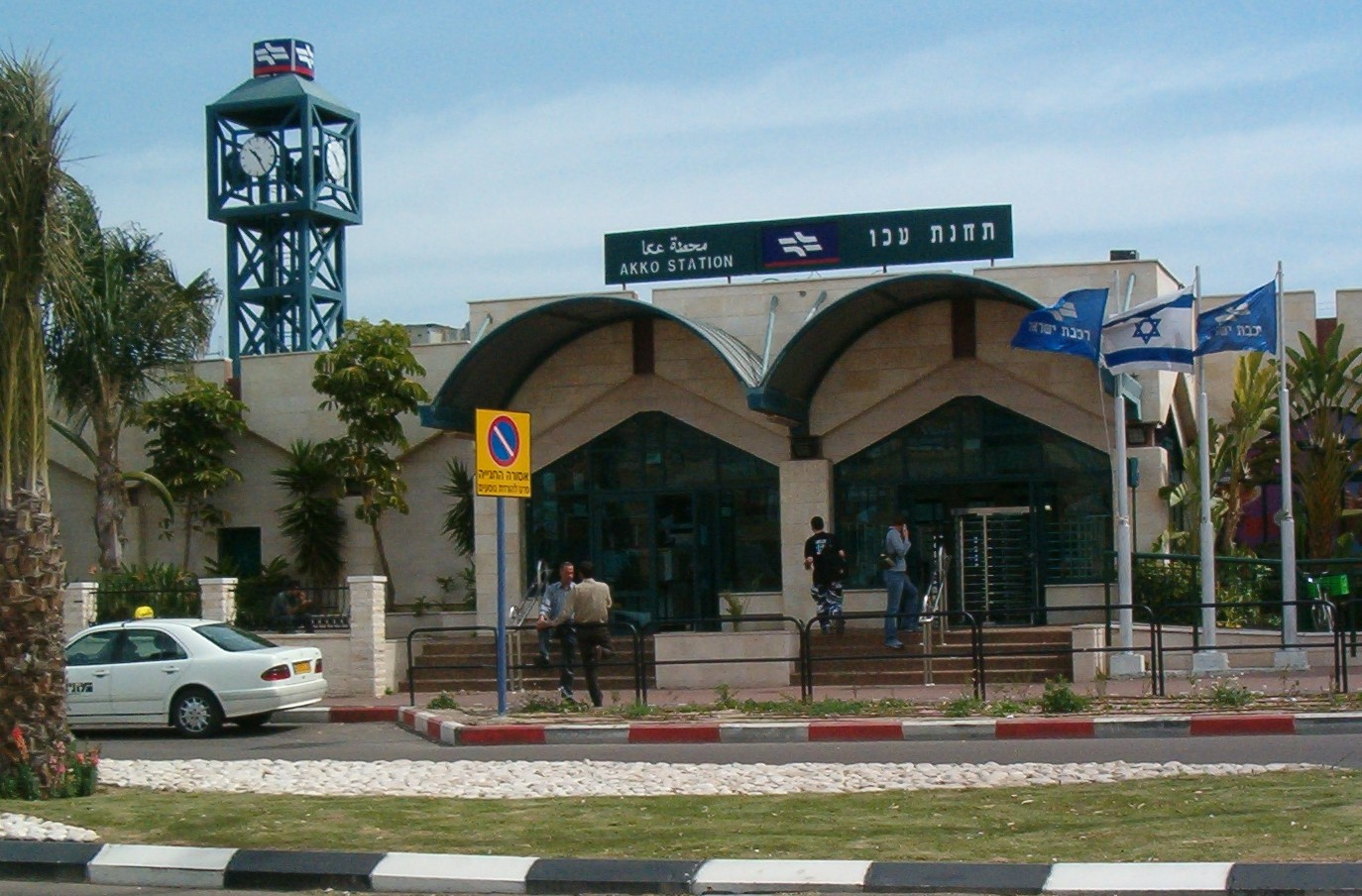
Acre Railway Station.

The Acre central bus station, served by Egged and Nateev Express, offers intra-city and inter-city bus routes to destinations all over Israel. Nateev Express is currently contracted to provide the intra-city bus routes within Acre. The city is also served by the Acre Railway Station, which is on the main Coastal railway line to Nahariya, with southerly trains to Beersheba and Modi'in-Maccabim-Re'ut.

== Education and culture ==
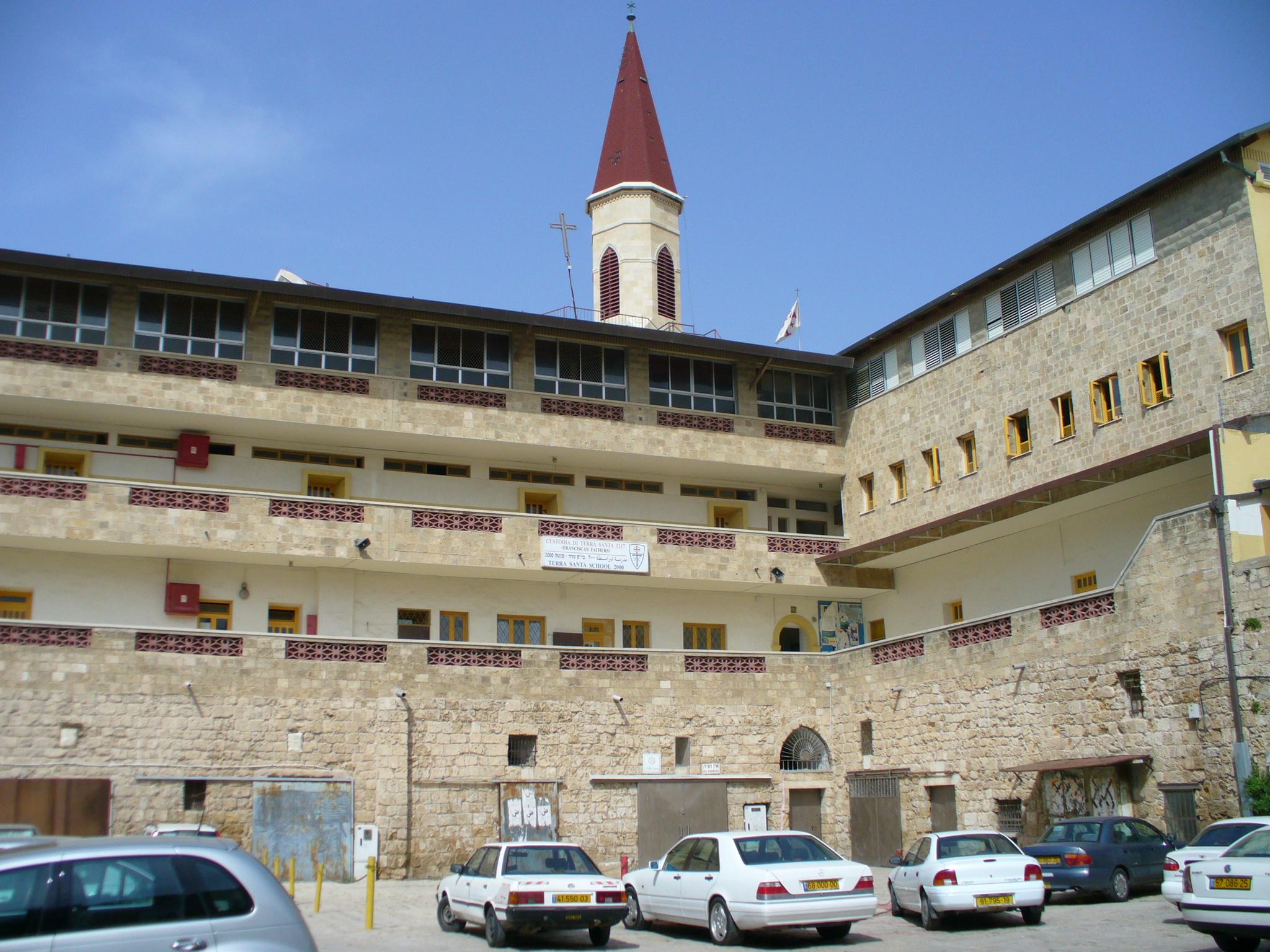
Terra Santa School in Old Acre.

The Sir Charles Clore Jewish-Arab Community Centre in the Kiryat Wolfson neighbourhood runs youth clubs and programs for Jewish and Arab children. In 1990, Mohammed Faheli, an Arab resident of Acre, founded the Acre Jewish-Arab association, which originally operated out of two bomb shelters. In 1993, Dame Vivien Duffield of the Clore Foundation donated funds for a new building. Among the programs offered is Peace Child Israel, which employs theatre and the arts to teach coexistence. The participants, Jews and Arabs, spend two months studying conflict resolution and then work together to produce an original theatrical performance that addresses the issues they have explored. Another program is Patriots of Acre, a community responsibility and youth tourism program that teaches children to become ambassadors for their city. In the summer, the centre runs an Arab-Jewish summer camp for 120 disadvantaged children aged 5–11. Some 1,000 children take part in the Acre Centre's youth club and youth programming every week. Adult education programs have been developed for Arab women interested in completing their high school education and acquiring computer skills to prepare for joining the workforce. The centre also offers parenting courses, and music and dance classes.

The Acco Festival of Alternative Israeli Theatre is an annual event that takes place in October, coinciding with the holiday of Sukkot. The festival, inaugurated in 1979, provides a forum for non-conventional theatre, attracting local and overseas theatre companies. Theatre performances by Jewish and Arab producers are staged at indoor and outdoor venues around the city.

== Sports ==
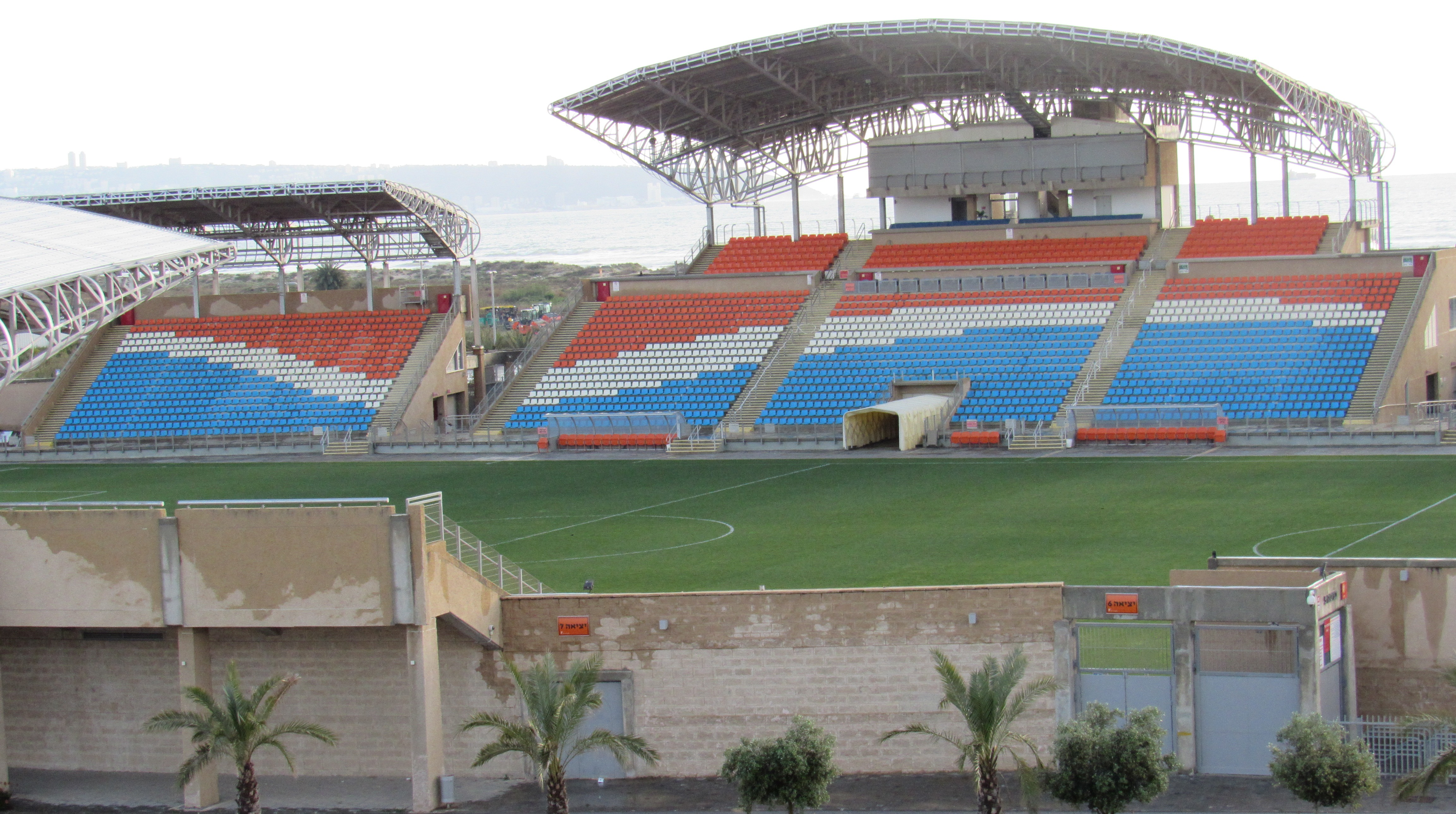
Acre Municipal Stadium.

The city's football team, Hapoel Acre F.C., is a member of the Israeli Premier League, the top tier of Israeli football. They play in the Acre Municipal Stadium which was opened in September 2011. At the end of the 2008–2009 season, the club finished in the top five, and was promoted to the top tier for a second time, after an absence of 31 years.

In the past the city was also home to Maccabi Acre. However, the club was relocated to nearby Kiryat Ata and was renamed Maccabi Ironi Kiryat Ata.

Other current active clubs are Ahi Acre and the newly formed Maccabi Ironi Acre, both playing in Liga Bet. Both clubs also host their matches in the Acre Municipal Stadium.

== Old City ==
Crusader and Ottoman settlements in Acre.

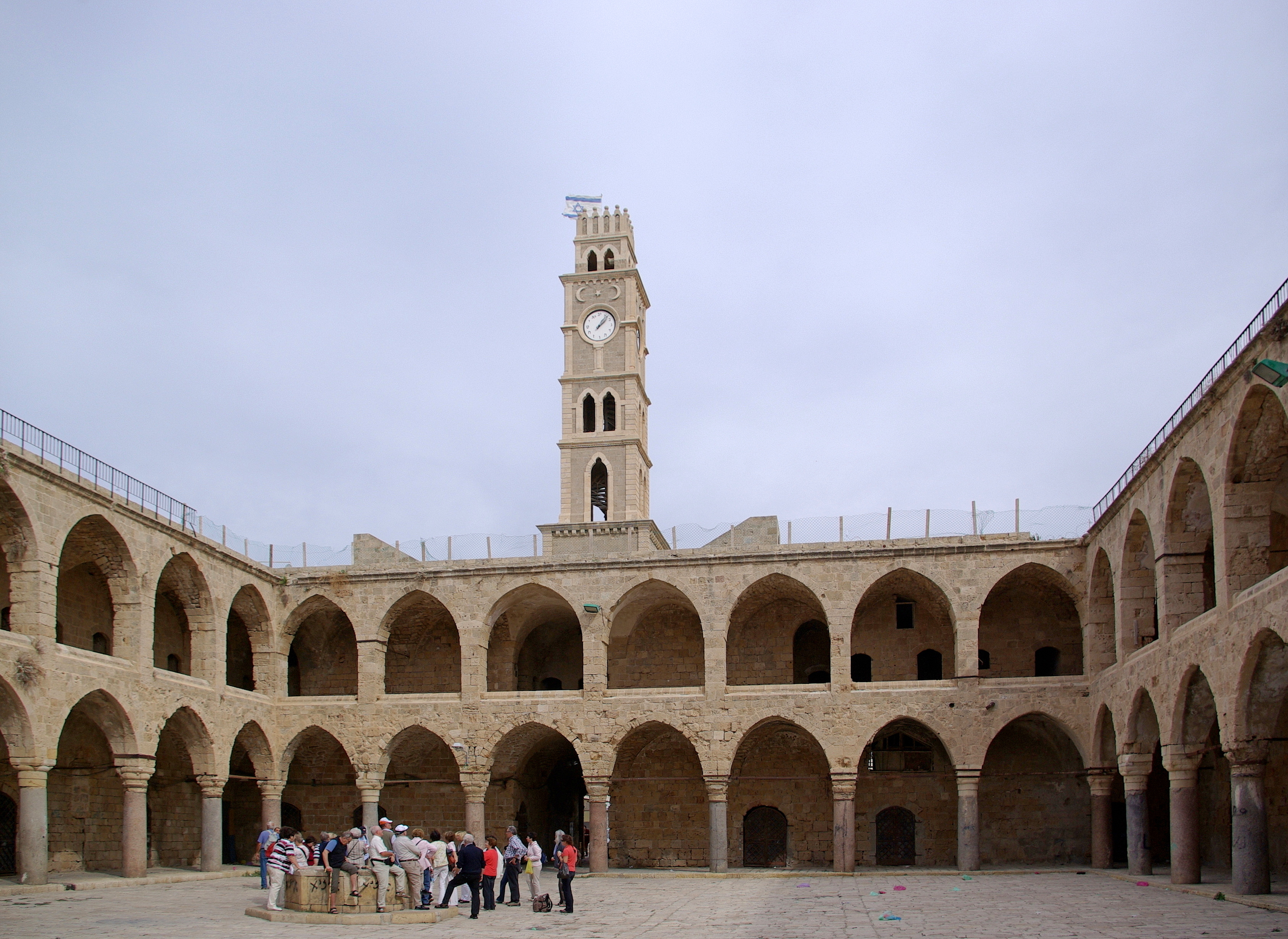
Khan al-Umdan in the old city of Acre.

Acre's Old City has been designated by UNESCO as a World Heritage Site. Since the 1990s, large-scale archaeological excavations have been undertaken, overseen by the Old Acre Development Company Ltd., established in 1967, and efforts are being made to preserve ancient sites, coordinated under the Israel Ministry of Tourism. The company collaborates with municipal authorities, acting as a government agency to supervise public and private construction in the Old City and advise on development matters. In 2009, renovations were planned for Khan al-Umdan, the "Inn of the Columns," the largest of several Ottoman inns still standing in Acre. It was built near the port at the end of the 18th century by Jazzar Pasha. Merchants who arrived at the port would unload their wares on the first floor and sleep in lodgings on the second floor. In 1906, a clock tower was added over the main entrance marking the 25th anniversary of the reign of the Turkish sultan, Abdul Hamid II.

=== City walls ===
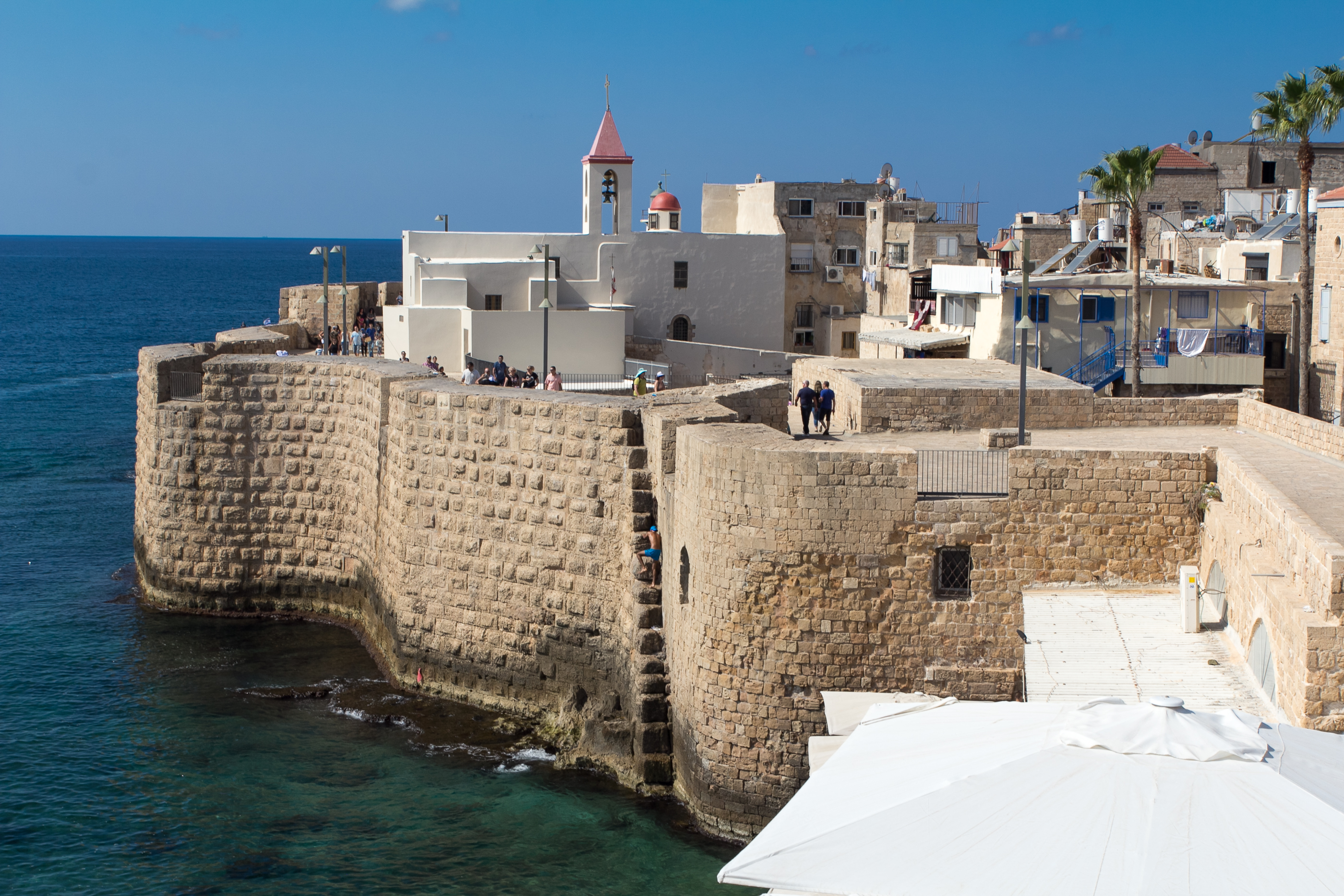
Acre's southern sea wall.

Acre's fortification system was developed over centuries. During the Crusades, the Old City was larger, with different wall alignments. In 1750, Daher al-Umar, the ruler of Acre, utilized the remnants of the Crusader walls as a foundation for his walls. Two gates were set in the wall, the "land gate" in the eastern wall, and the "sea gate" in the southern wall. The walls were reinforced between 1775 and 1799 by Jazzar Pasha and survived Napoleon's siege. The wall was thin, at only 1.5 metres (4.9 ft), and rose to a height of between 10 metres (33 ft) and 13 metres (43 ft).

A heavy land defensive wall was built north and east to the city in 1800–1814 by Jazzar Pasha and his Jewish advisor, Haim Farhi. It consists of a modern counter-artillery fortification which includes a thick defensive wall, a dry moat, cannon outposts and three burges (large defensive towers). Since then, no major modifications have taken place. The sea wall, which remains mostly complete, is the original wall built by Daher that was reinforced by Jazzar Pasha. In 1910, two additional gates were set in the walls, one in the northern wall and one in the north-western corner of the city.

The city walls begin at the northwestern corner of the Old City at the Vineyard Tower (Arabic: Burj al-Kurayim, also known as the British Fortress). East of it, a new passage was created for Hagana Street. The walls extend eastward, passing north of the citadel's fortifications and reaching a second new passage for Haim Weizmann Street. Beyond this, the walls pass north of the arsenal and reach the Commander's Tower (Arabic: Burj al-Kumandar), a squat defensive bastion with multiple artillery positions guarding the northeastern corner of Acre's Old City. From its summit, there is a view of Haifa Bay and Mount Carmel above Haifa. Nearby is the Treasures in the Walls Museum, showcasing the city's historical heritage with hundreds of artifacts, including furniture, textiles, and artistic and religious vessels. The walls then turn south, where stairs lead to a promenade with cannons from the Napoleonic era. The third defensive tower, the Gate Tower (Arabic: Kapu Burj), guarded the Land Gate, now accessed via Jehonatan HaHashmonai Street. The walls then turn west along the city beach, reaching the sea's edge and turning south toward the fishing port and marina. At the former Sea Gate, now the Abu Christo restaurant, a seaside promenade begins, leading to the Flag Tower (Arabic: Burj as-Sanjaq), a bastion guarding the southwestern corner, home to the Acre lighthouse, built in 1912 on the south-western corner of the walls. The walls then turn north, passing two defensive towers, Burj al-Kishla and Al-Khadid Burj, before returning to the Vineyard Tower.

=== Al-Jazzar Mosque ===
Al-Jazzar Mosque was built in 1781. Jazzar Pasha and his successor, Sulayman Pasha al-Adil, are both buried in a small graveyard adjacent to the mosque. In a shrine on the second level of the mosque, a single hair from Muhammad's beard is kept and shown on special ceremonial occasions.

=== Hamam al-Basha ===
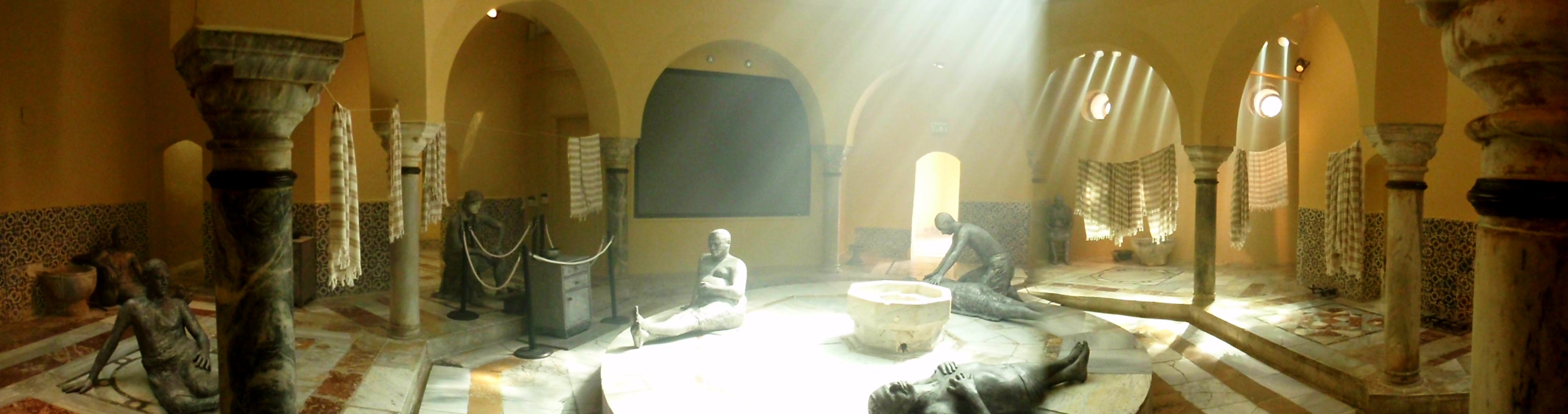
Interior of Hammam al-Basha Turkish bathhouse in Acre

Built in 1795 by Jazzar Pasha, Acre's Hammam (Turkish bathhouse), south of the citadel, has a series of hot rooms and a hexagonal steam room with a marble fountain. It was used by the Irgun as a bridge to break into the citadel's prison. The bathhouse kept functioning until 1950 and has housed a museum since 1954. The building features marble floors, tiled walls, and colored glass in the domed roof, supported by four marble columns.

=== Citadel of Acre ===
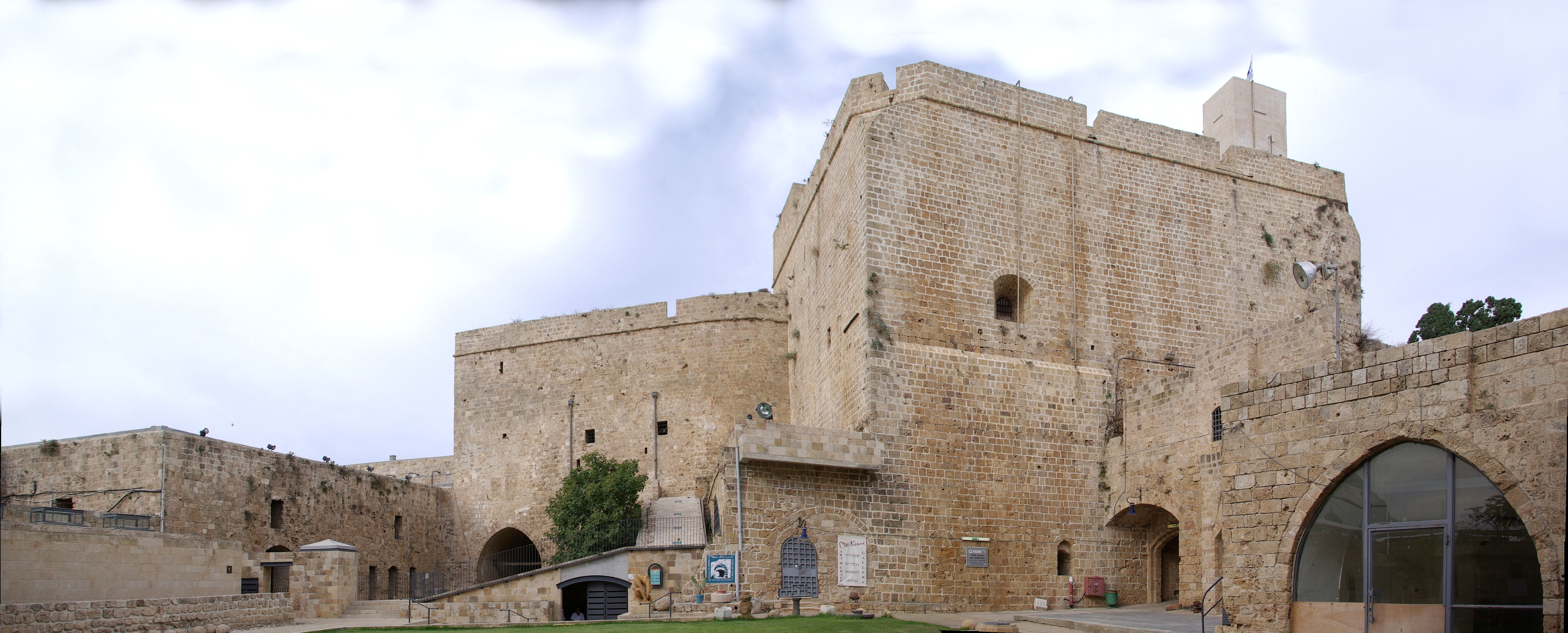
Panorama of Acre's citadel

In the northern part of the Old City stands the citadel, built between 1775 and 1805 by Jazzar Pasha on the foundations of an older Crusader fortress. The current building is an Ottoman fortification, built on the foundation of the citadel of the Knights Hospitaller. The citadel was part of the city's defensive formation, reinforcing the northern wall. There, the citadel integrates with the defensive walls at the Treasury Tower (Arabic: Burj al-Hazana), with a view of the Old City and Haifa Bay. East of the tower, a Crusader-era garden has been recreated in front of the Visitor Center entrance. The citadel features two inner courtyards, measuring 170 meters east to west and about 100 meters wide. During the 20th century the citadel was used mainly as Acre Prison and as the site for a gallows. During the Palestinian mandate period, activists of Arab nationalist and the Jewish Zionist movements were held prisoner there; some were executed there.

Today, the citadel's primary attraction is the Museum of Underground Prisoners, dedicated to the Jewish resistance during the Mandatory Palestine. Exhibits include artifacts from nine executed Jewish fighters and a prison gallows. One display is a model depicting a 1947 prisoner escape. Adjacent is the Okashi Art Museum, showcasing works by Israeli painter Absalom Okashi.

=== Hospitaller fortress ===
Under the citadel and prison of Acre, archaeological excavations revealed a complex of halls, which was built and used by the Knights Hospitaller. This complex was a part of the Hospitallers citadel, which was included in the northern defences of Acre. The complex includes six semi-joined halls, one recently excavated large hall, a dungeon, a refectory (dining room) and remains of a Gothic church.

=== Old saraya ===
The old saraya lies south of the citadel, a two-story structure with an open, paved rectangular courtyard. Built in the 18th century on the ruins of the Church of St. John the Baptist, it served as Jazzar Pasha's private residence. After he constructed a new palace, the serai housed civil administrative offices. In the early 19th century, Ibrahim Pasha used it as a treasury, and it later became the governor's residence.

=== Synagogues ===
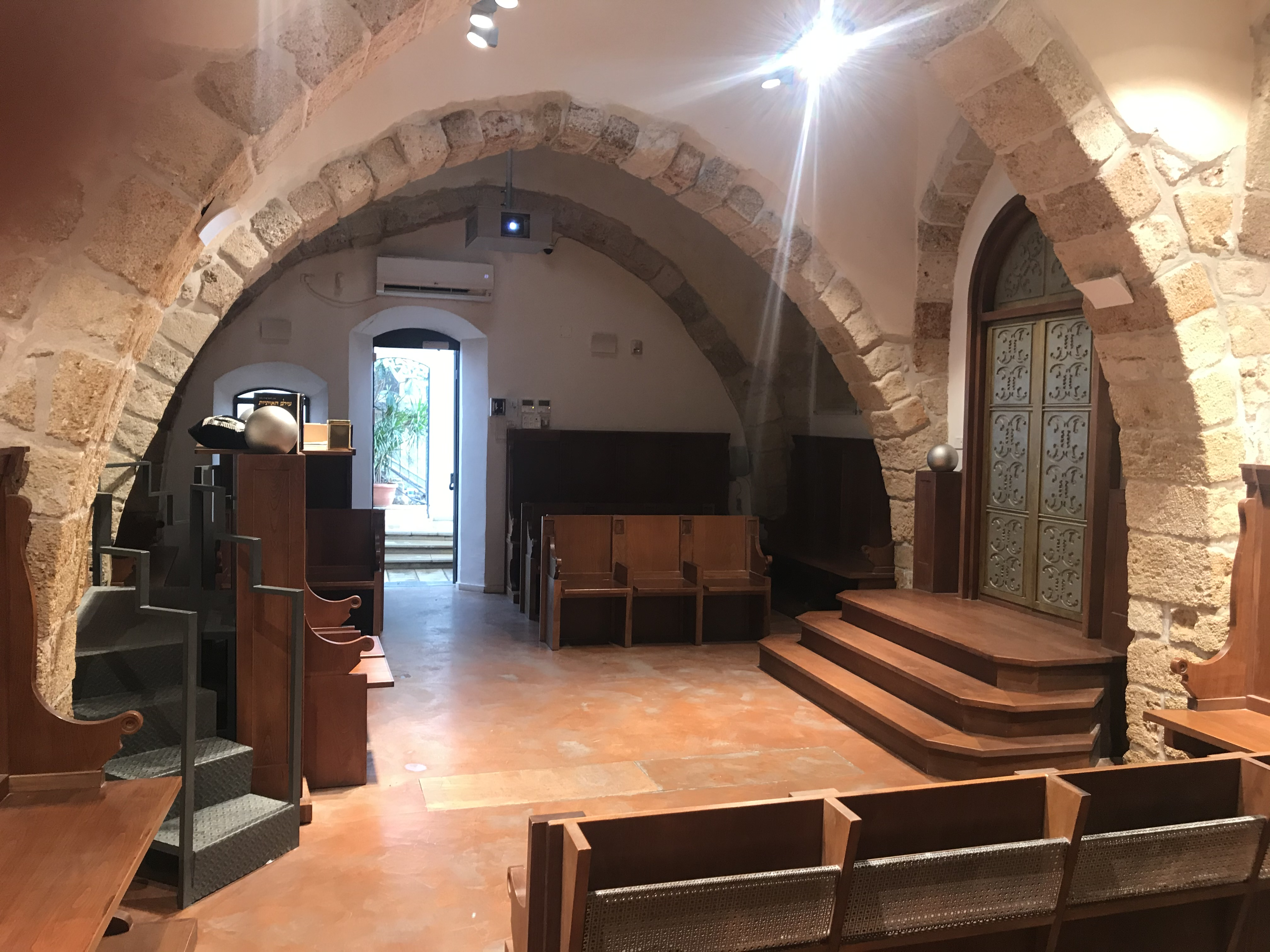
Interior of the Ramchal Synagogue

The Jewish community maintains two synagogues in Acre: the Ramchal Synagogue and the Or Torah Synagogue. The Ramchal Synagogue, located in the heart of the Old City, is named after Rabbi Ramchal, who lived in Acre from 1743 to 1747. In 1758, Bedouin ruler Daher al-Umar seized it, converting it into the al-Mu'allaq Mosque. As compensation, the Jewish community received a small building north of the mosque. In the early 21st century, the synagogue was renovated and opened to tourists. Near the Old City's outer walls is the Tunisian Synagogue, also known as Or Torah. Legend claims that after the Second Temple's destruction in 70 CE, priests arrived in Acre, founding the El-Zaira Jewish quarter and placing salvaged Temple doors in the synagogue. Its interior is decorated with mosaics.

=== Christian churches ===
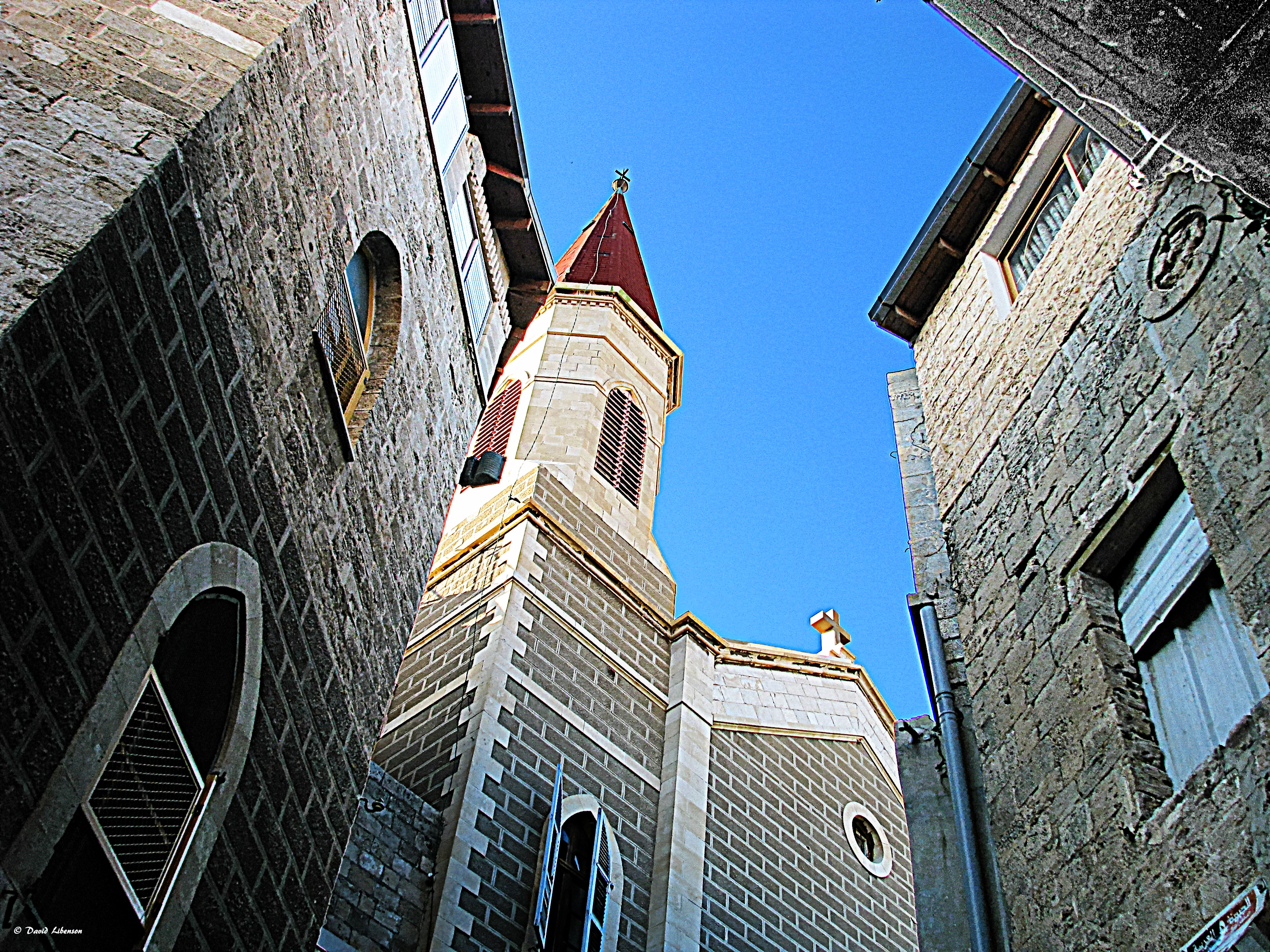
Terra Sancta Church.

Christian churches are mostly concentrated in the southwestern part of Acre's Old City. Historical records and 13th-century maps indicate that the Carmelites had a church near the sea. After the Crusaders left in 1291, the Carmelites departed, returning in the early 17th century to reestablish a church. Acre holds significance for the Franciscans, who believe their founder, Francis of Assisi, visited between 1219 and 1220. In 1217, Father Elia Da Cortona founded the first Franciscan monastery there. After Muslim conquest, the Franciscans fled, returning in 1620 to establish the Terra Sancta Church, the only church in the eastern Old City. Saint George Greek Orthodox Cathedral, built before 1631 in the Greek Orthodox tradition, is considered the oldest Christian church in Acre. Further south are the Maronite Church, the Carmelite church and monastery dedicated to the Dome of Nazareth, and a second Greek Orthodox church, Church of Saint Andrew. Near the lighthouse stands Saint John the Baptist Church, a Franciscan church built in 1737 and renovated in 1947, the only active Roman Catholic church in Acre.

=== Mosques ===
Among the sacred sites in Acre's Old City, Muslim mosques are the most numerous. The oldest, the El-Bahr Mosque, built in 1586, lies in the southeastern part near the port, historically encompassing a bathhouse, café, warehouses, and shops. The most prominent is the El-Jazzar Mosque, built in 1781 near the citadel and old saraya. Its green dome and tall, slender minaret are visible across the Old City. It is Israel's largest mosque outside Jerusalem and the largest built in Palestine during Ottoman rule. South of the citadel, the Az-Zaytuna Mosque features two green domes and a tall minaret, reportedly built on the site of a Crusader-era Church of St. Mary and Joseph. Adjacent to the citadel's west side is the Ash-Shadhiliyya Mosque, renovated in the early 21st century and home to a dervish brotherhood. Further west is the Al-Majadala Mosque, built in 1809. In the central Old City are the Al-Muallaq Mosque and, further east, the Ar-Raml Mosque.

=== Caravanserais and bazaars ===
Several historic caravanserais, once hosting merchant caravans, are preserved in the Old City. The Khan al-Umdan, built in 1785 near the port, featured a courtyard for unloading goods, with warehouses and an inn on the ground floor and a hotel upstairs. Its courtyard is adorned with granite columns from Roman Caesarea. In 1906, an Ottoman clock tower was added, with views of the port. About 30 meters west, the Khan ash-Shuna is neglected but it has original Crusader structures on its ground floor. In the city center, the Khan al-Ifranj, the oldest fully preserved caravanserai, was built in the mid-16th century by French merchants, hence its name. Its northern and northeastern wings now house the Franciscan Terra Santa School. In the eastern Old City, the Khan ash-Shawarda was likely built on the site of a former Poor Clares convent. During British Mandate rule, its inner courtyard was converted into a street.

The most famous bazaar in Acre is the Suq Al-Abiad (White Market), built in the mid-18th century. For over 150 years, it was the city's primary marketplace, originally housing 110 shops but now reduced to 64 due to war damage. This covered market street, about 100 meters long, features cafés and shops on both sides. South of the El-Jazzar Mosque is the Turkish Bazaar, built in the late 18th century and used as a market until 1948. This 100-meter-long commercial street has a cross-vaulted ceiling with rectangular openings for sunlight, now housing art and souvenir shops. A commercial street also spans Marco Polo, Benjamin Metudela, and Fahir ad-Din streets.

=== Seaport ===
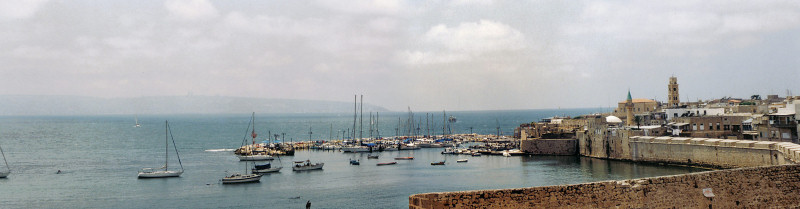
Panorama of the port in Acre

Acre was a vital maritime and fishing port. The first port in Acre was established in the 6th century BCE at the Na'aman river's mouth, south of the current Old City. In the 7th century, Arabs built a new port with a shipyard, serving as the main Muslim naval base against Byzantium. In the 8th century, the port and shipyard were relocated north to Tyre. Neglected until the late 9th century, the port was rebuilt by Egyptians with fortified defenses. It gained prominence under Crusader rule but was neglected again until the late 17th century. Today, it serves as a small fishing harbor and marina.

=== Other medieval sites ===
Other medieval European remains include the Church of Saint George and adjacent houses at the Genovese Square (called Kikar ha-Genovezim or Kikar Genoa in Hebrew). There were also residential quarters and marketplaces run by merchants from Pisa and Amalfi in Crusader and medieval Acre.

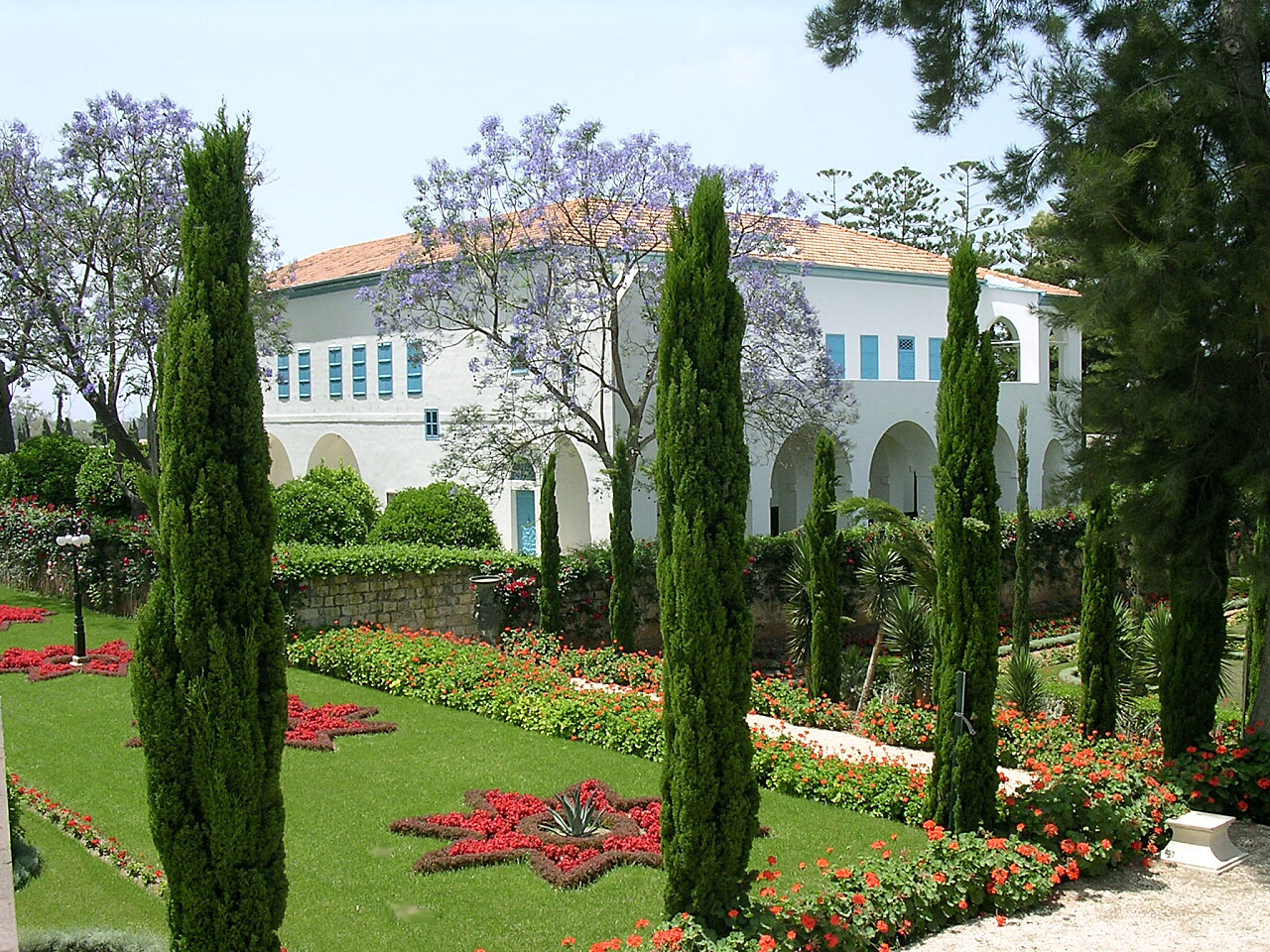
Baháʼí shrine outside Acre, Bahji mansion.

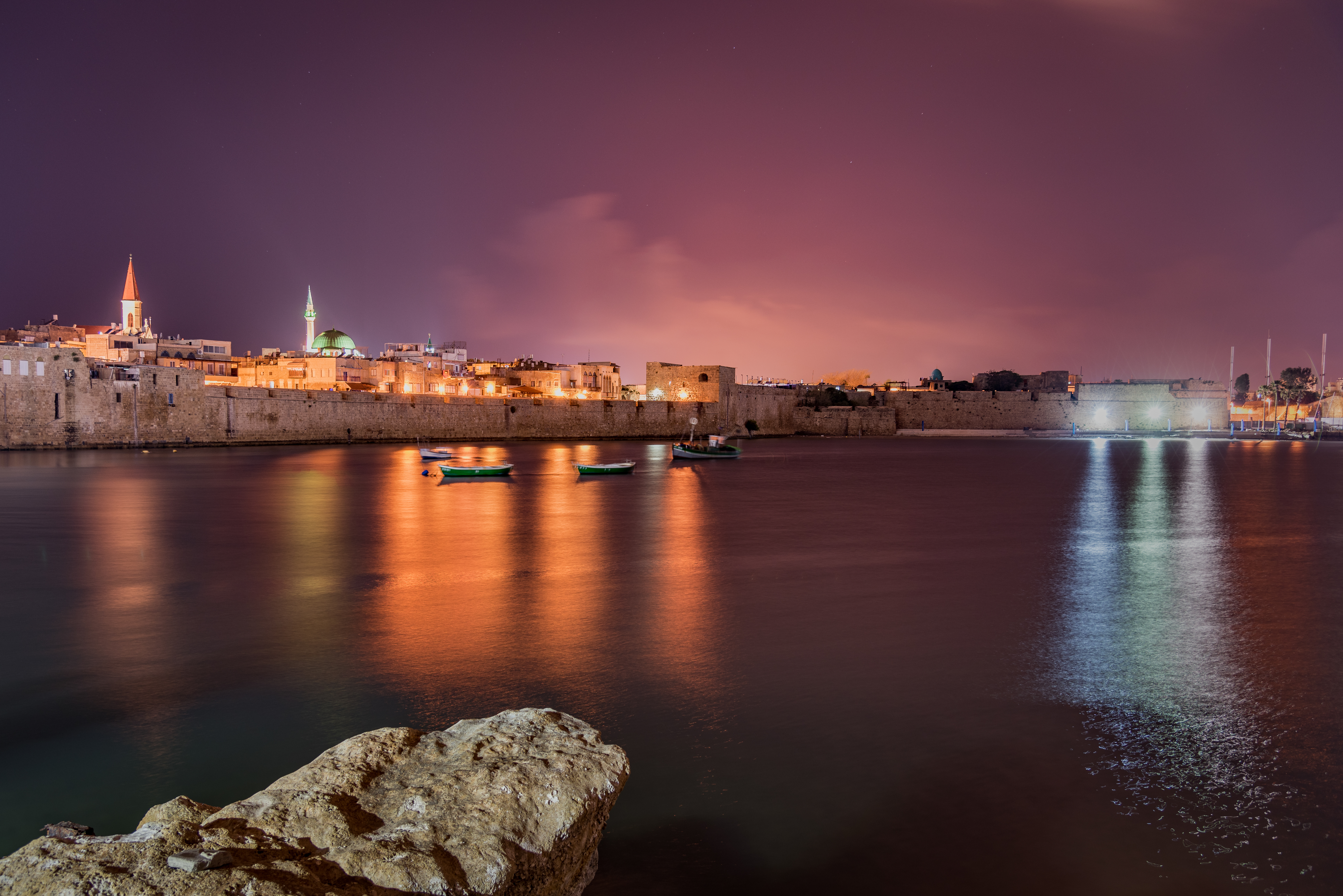
Acre's sea wall at night.

=== Baháʼí holy places ===
There are many Baháʼí holy places in and around Acre. They originate from Baháʼu'lláh's imprisonment in the Citadel during Ottoman Rule. The final years of Baháʼu'lláh's life were spent in the Mansion of Bahjí, just outside Acre, even though he was still formally a prisoner of the Ottoman Empire. Baháʼu'lláh died on 29 May 1892 in Bahjí, and the Shrine of Baháʼu'lláh is the most holy place for Baháʼís — their Qiblih, the location they face when saying their daily prayers. It contains the remains of Baháʼu'lláh and is near the spot where he died in the Mansion of Bahjí. Other Baháʼí sites in Acre are the House of ʻAbbúd (where Baháʼu'lláh and his family resided) and the House of ʻAbdu'lláh Páshá (where later ʻAbdu'l-Bahá resided with his family), and the Garden of Ridván where he spent the end of his life. In 2008, the Baháʼí holy places in Acre and Haifa were added to the UNESCO World Heritage List.

== Voting Patterns ==
In the 2022 election, 52 percent of voters in Acre voted for the parties of the right-wing coalition led by Benjamin Netanyahu, while 26 percent voted for the Arab parties and 20 percent voted for the parties of the center-left coalition led by Yair Lapid.

In the 2026 election, 44 percent of voters in Acre voted for the parties of the right-wing coalition led by Benjamin Netanyahu, while 33 percent voted for the Arab parties and 19 percent voted for the parties of the center-left coalition led by Gadi Eisenkot. An additional 1.6 percent voted for the Reservists, and 0.9 percent voted for Amcha Yisrael. Voter turnout increased 21 percent from the 2022 election.

== International relations ==
Acre is twinned with:

Bielsko-Biała, Poland; Bregenz, Austria; Canton, Ohio, United States; Deerfield Beach, Florida, United States	La Rochelle, France, since 1972; Nanjing, China, since 2019; Pisa, Italy, since 1998; Recklinghausen, Germany; Nagykanizsa, Hungary

== Notable people ==
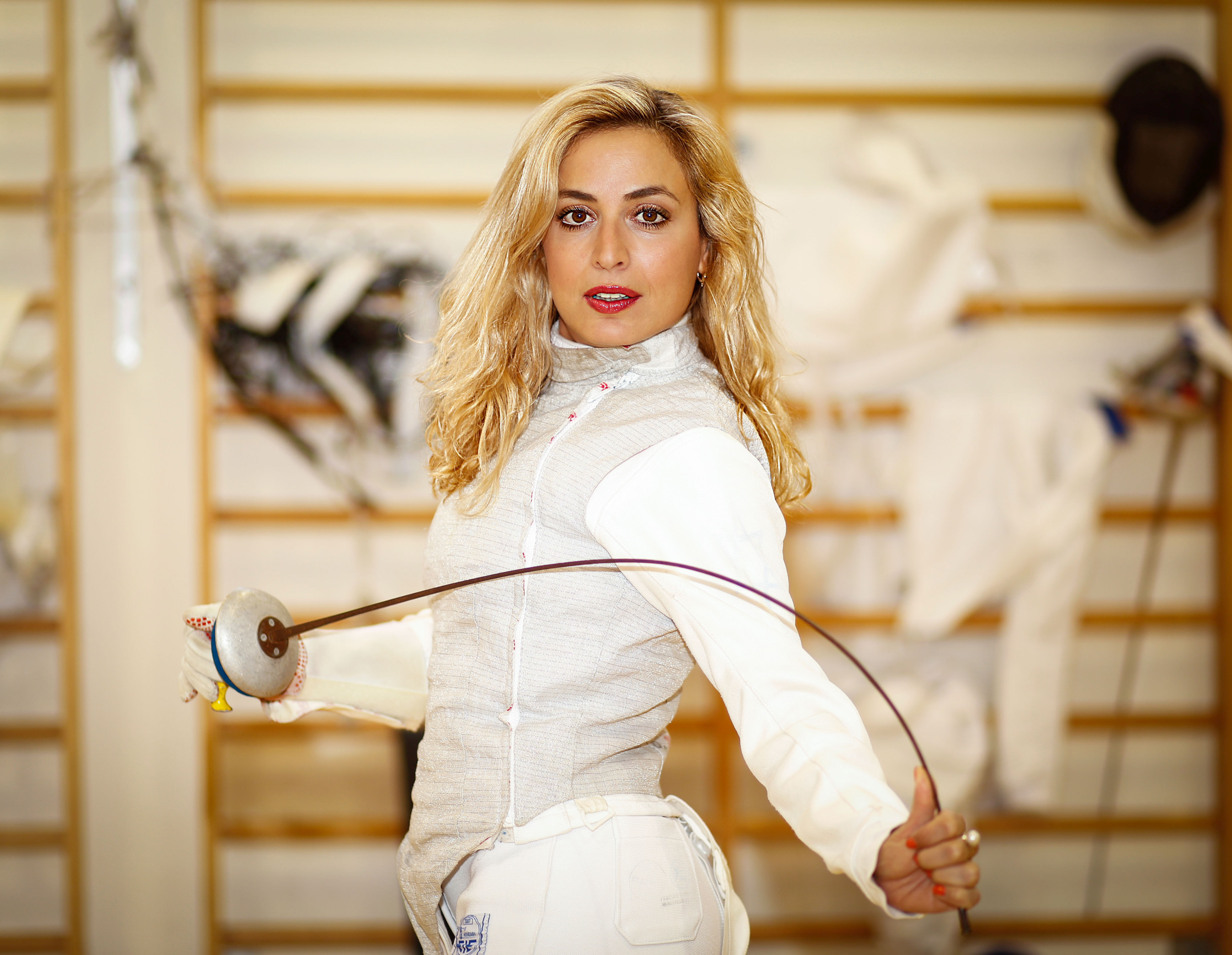
Delila Hatuel, foil fencing Olympic athlete.

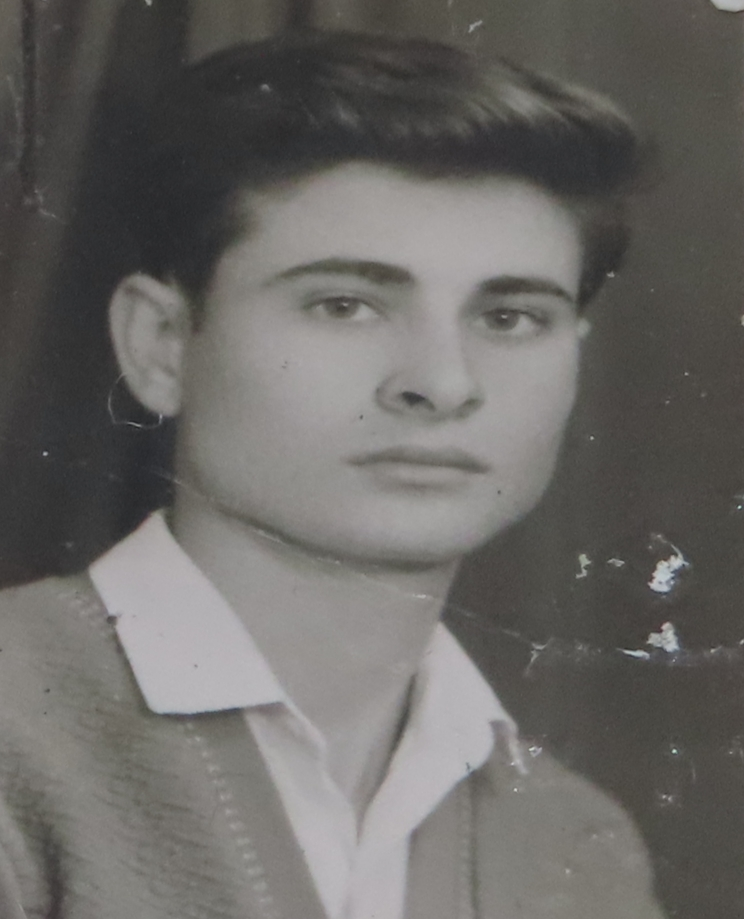
Mahmoud Darwish, Palestinian poet and author, also regarded as Palestine's national poet.

- Joan of Acre (1272–1307), English princess born in Acre
- Isaac ben Samuel of Acre (13th-14th century), Jewish kabbalist who fled to Spain
- As'ad Shukeiri (1860–1940, Palestinian religious scholar political leader and mayor of Acre
- Issam Sartawi (1935–1983), senior member of the Palestine Liberation Organization (PLO)
- Ghassan Kanafani (1936–1972), Palestinian writer
- Raymonda Tawil (born 1940), Palestinian journalist and activist
- Mahmoud Darwish (1941–2008), Palestinian poet and author, widely considered Palestine's national poet; born in the village of Al-Birwa on the outskirts of Acre.
- Rivka Zohar (born 1948), Israeli singer
- Lydia Hatuel-Czuckermann (born 1963), Olympic foil fencer
- Shai Avivi (born 1964), Israeli actor
- Ron Malka (born 1965), Israeli diplomat and economist who served as the ambassador of Israel to India and non resident ambassador to Sri Lanka and Bhutan, from 2018 to 2021
- Kamilya Jubran (born 1966), Israeli-born Palestinian singer, songwriter, and musician
- Ayelet Ohayon (born 1974), Olympic foil fencer
- Delila Hatuel (born 1980), Olympic foil fencer
- Eliad Cohen (born 1988), Israeli producer, actor, model, entrepreneur, and prominent gay personality
- Lamis Ammar (born 1992), Palestinian actress
- Avigail Alfatov (born 1996), national fencing champion, soldier, and Miss Israel 2014

== In popular culture ==
- Acre is one of three main settings in the video game Assassin's Creed.
- The siege of Acre is depicted at the beginning of the Knightfall TV series.

== See also ==
- District of Acre, Mandatory Palestine
- Armistice of Saint Jean d'Acre (14 July 1941) between the Allies and Vichy France forces in Syria and Lebanon
- Cities of the ancient Near East
- Terra Sancta Church
