= Akra =

Akra may refer to:

== Places ==
- Acra (fortress), a Seleucid fortress in Jerusalem
- Akra, hamlet in Greene County (see Cairo, New York) where Jack "Legs" Diamond is rumored to have had a home
- Akra, Bannu, an archaeological site south of Peshawar in Pakistan
- Akra, Maheshtala, South 24 Parganas, West Bengal, India
  - Akra railway station
- Akra Peninsula, a peninsula in Antarctica
- Akra Township, Pembina County, North Dakota, a township in North Dakota, USA
- Akra Leuke, ancient city founded by Greeks, modern Alicante, Spain
- Akra, Crimea, a submerged ancient Greek city in Crimea

== People ==
- Yasser Akra (born 1985), Syrian footballer

== See also ==
- Aakra or Åkra (disambiguation)
- Accra, the capital of Ghana
- Acra (disambiguation)
- Acre (disambiguation)
- Akre (disambiguation)
- Aqra (disambiguation)
