= Acra =

Acra or ACRA may refer to:

== Abbreviation (ACRA) ==
- Accounting and Corporate Regulatory Authority
- All-Channel Receiver Act
- American Car Rental Association
- American Collegiate Rowing Association
- Analytical Credit Rating Agency of Russia
- Arwarbukarl Cultural Resource Association
- ACTRA
- Australian Cultivar Registration Authority
- Acriflavine resistance protein A encode a multi-drug efflux system of bacteria

== Places ==
- Acra (fortress) (2nd century BC), a Seleucid fortified compound in Jerusalem; late Second Temple residential area in Jerusalem
- Ptolemaic Acra or Ptolemaic Baris (3rd century BC), a Ptolemaic citadel in Jerusalem

=== United States ===
- Acra, New York, a hamlet located within the town of Cairo, New York

== People ==
- Reem Acra, Lebanese fashion designer

== See also ==
- Aakra or Åkra (disambiguation)
- Accra, the capital of Ghana
- Acre (disambiguation)
- Akra (disambiguation)
- Akre (disambiguation)
- Aqra (disambiguation)
