= Acre (disambiguation) =

An acre is a unit of measurement used for areas of land.

Acre may also refer to:

== Places ==
- Acre, Israel, a city in Israel
  - Old City of Acre, a UNESCO world heritage site
  - Sanjak of Acre, a prefecture of the Ottoman Empire, located in present-day Israel
- Acre (state), a Brazilian state
- Republic of Acre, a series of separatist governments in then Bolivia's Acre region (1899–1903)
- Acre River, running through Peru, Bolivia, and Brazil
- Acre, Lancashire, a village in Lancashire, England
- Heroes' Acre (Namibia), a Namibian war memorial
- National Heroes' Acre (Zimbabwe), a Zimbabwean war memorial
- The Acre, a historic house in Harrisville, New Hampshire, US

== Other uses ==
- Acre (Cheshire), a historical unit of area in Cheshire, England
- Acre (surname)
- Acre-class destroyer a class of Brazilian ships
- Acre (Freebase), a JavaScript application hosting environment for Freebase
- Alliance of Conservatives and Reformists in Europe, a European political party
- Atmospheric Circulation Reconstructions over the Earth, a science project
- Acre: Richard Lionheart's Siege, a 1978 wargame that simulates the Siege of Acre

== See also ==
- Aakra or Åkra (disambiguation)
- Abba of Acre (fl. 3rd century)
- Accra, the capital of Ghana
- Acer (disambiguation)
- Acra (disambiguation)
- Acres (surname)
- Aker (disambiguation)
- Akra (disambiguation)
- Akre (disambiguation)
- Aqra (disambiguation)
- Joan of Acre (1272–1307), English princess
- Town acre
