= Akre (disambiguation) =

Akre is a city and district in Iraq.

Akre may also refer to:

- Akre, Israel
- Akre (surname), a surname

== See also ==
- Aakra or Åkra (disambiguation)
- Accra, the capital of Ghana
- Acra (disambiguation)
- Acre (disambiguation)
- Akra (disambiguation)
- Aqra (disambiguation)
