= Aqra (disambiguation) =

Aqra, properly ʿAqra, is a diocese of the Chaldean Catholic Church

Aqra may also refer to:

- Jebel Aqra (properly Jebel al-ʾAqraʿ), a mountain on the Turco-Syrian coast that was a center of pagan worship for millennia
- Aqrah (properly ʻAqra or Akrê), a city and district in Iraq

== See also ==
- Aakra or Åkra (disambiguation)
- Accra, the capital of Ghana
- Acra (disambiguation)
- Acre (disambiguation)
- Akra (disambiguation)
- Akre (disambiguation)
- AQRE or QRE - quantal response equilibrium, a solution concept in game theory
