= Åkra =

Åkra may refer to:

== Places ==
- Åkra Municipality, a former municipality in Rogaland county, Norway
- Åkra, or Åkrahamn, a town in Karmøy municipality, Rogaland county, Norway
- Åkra, Vestland, a village in Kvinnherad municipality, Vestland county, Norway

=== Churches ===
- Åkra Church (Rogaland), a church in Karmøy municipality, Rogaland county, Norway
- Åkra Church (Vestland), a church in Kvinnherad municipality, Vestland county, Norway
- Old Åkra Church, a church in Karmøy municipality, Rogaland county, Norway

== See also ==
- Accra, the capital of Ghana
- Acra (disambiguation)
- Acre (disambiguation)
- Akra (disambiguation)
- Akre (disambiguation)
- Aqra (disambiguation)
