= Acriflavine resistance protein family =

ACR_tran
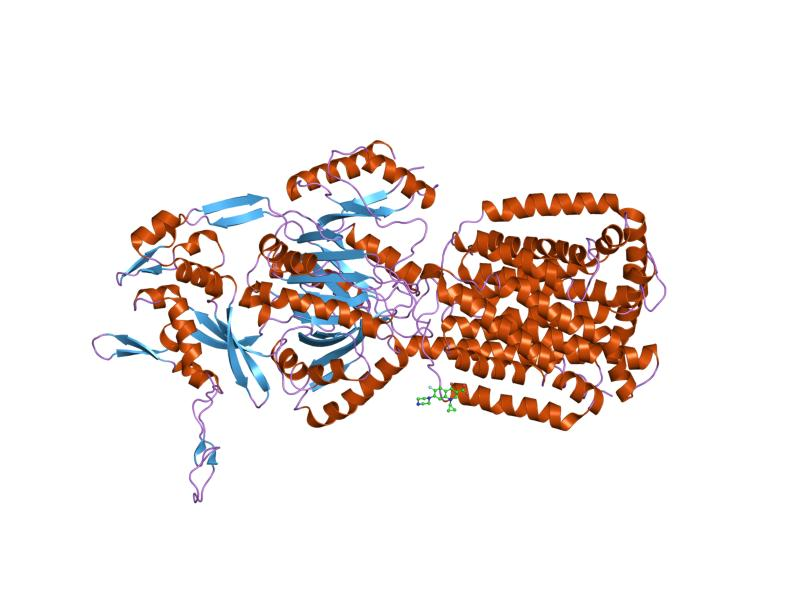
- structural basis of multiple binding capacity of the AcrB multidrug efflux pump

Identifiers
- Symbol: ACR_tran
- Pfam: PF00873
- Pfam clan: CL0322
- InterPro: IPR001036
- SCOP2: 1oy6 / SCOPe / SUPFAM
- TCDB: 2.A.6
- OPM superfamily: 16
- OPM protein: 2gif
Available protein structures:
- PDB: IPR001036 PF00873 (ECOD; PDBsum)
- AlphaFold: IPR001036; PF00873

In Escherichia coli, acriflavine resistance genes (acrA and acrB) encode a multi-drug efflux system that is believed to protect the bacterium against hydrophobic inhibitors. The E. coli AcrB protein is a transporter that is energized by proton-motive force and that shows the widest substrate specificity among all known multidrug pumps, ranging from most of the currently used antibiotics, disinfectants, dyes, and detergents to simple solvents.

The structure of ligand-free AcrB shows that it is a homotrimer of 110kDa per subunit. Each subunit contains 12 transmembrane helices and two large periplasmic domains (each exceeding 300 residues) between helices 1 and 2, and helices 7 and 8. X-ray analysis of the overexpressed AcrB protein demonstrated that the three periplasmic domains form, in the centre, a funnel-like structure and a connected narrow (or closed) pore. The pore is opened to the periplasm through three vestibules located at subunit interfaces. These vestibules were proposed to allow direct access of drugs from the periplasm as well as the outer leaflet of the cytoplasmic membrane. The three transmembrane domains of AcrB protomers form a large, 30Å-wide central cavity that spans the cytoplasmic membrane and extends to the cytoplasm

X-ray crystallographic structures of the trimeric AcrB pump from E. coli with four structurally diverse ligands demonstrated that three molecules of ligand bind simultaneously to the extremely large central cavity of 5000 cubic angstroms, primarily by hydrophobic, aromatic stacking and van der Waals interactions. Each ligand uses a slightly different subset of AcrB residues for binding. The bound ligand molecules often interact with each other, stabilising the binding.
