= Akre (surname) =

Akre is a surname. Notable people with the surname include:

- Carrie Akre (born 1966), American singer
- Charles T. Akre (21st century), American investor
- Helge Akre (born 1903), Norwegian diplomat
- Jane Akre (21st century), American journalist
- Karl Akre (1840–1912), Norwegian politician
