= Akra, Crimea =

Disappeared port city in Crimea

Coordinates: 45°08′04″N 36°25′27″E

Akra (Ancient Greek: Ἄκρα) was an ancient Greek city at the Cimmerian Bosporus. The city is now underwater at the Kerch Strait, near the Naberezhne village in Crimea. It was flooded as a result of the transgression of the Black Sea and is now almost entirely immersed in the sea, with the exception of a small section at the Yanysh lake.

It was founded in the late 6th BC by Nymphaeum or Panticapaeum and was part of the Kingdom of Bosporus until the beginning of the 4th AD. It was an important place for anchoring and trade.

The layers of the Roman and the Late Hellenistic periods are destroyed by the waves but the early Hellenistic and Classical periods layers are intact. The city had well-developed fortifications, including walls and towers. The underwater research has revealed many archaeological findings including coins, amphoras, terracottas, buildings and personal objects.

== See also ==
- List of Ancient Greek cities
- Greek colonisation
