= Old City of Acre =

Old city in Israel

Old City of Acre البلدة القديمة العكّا
- Old city
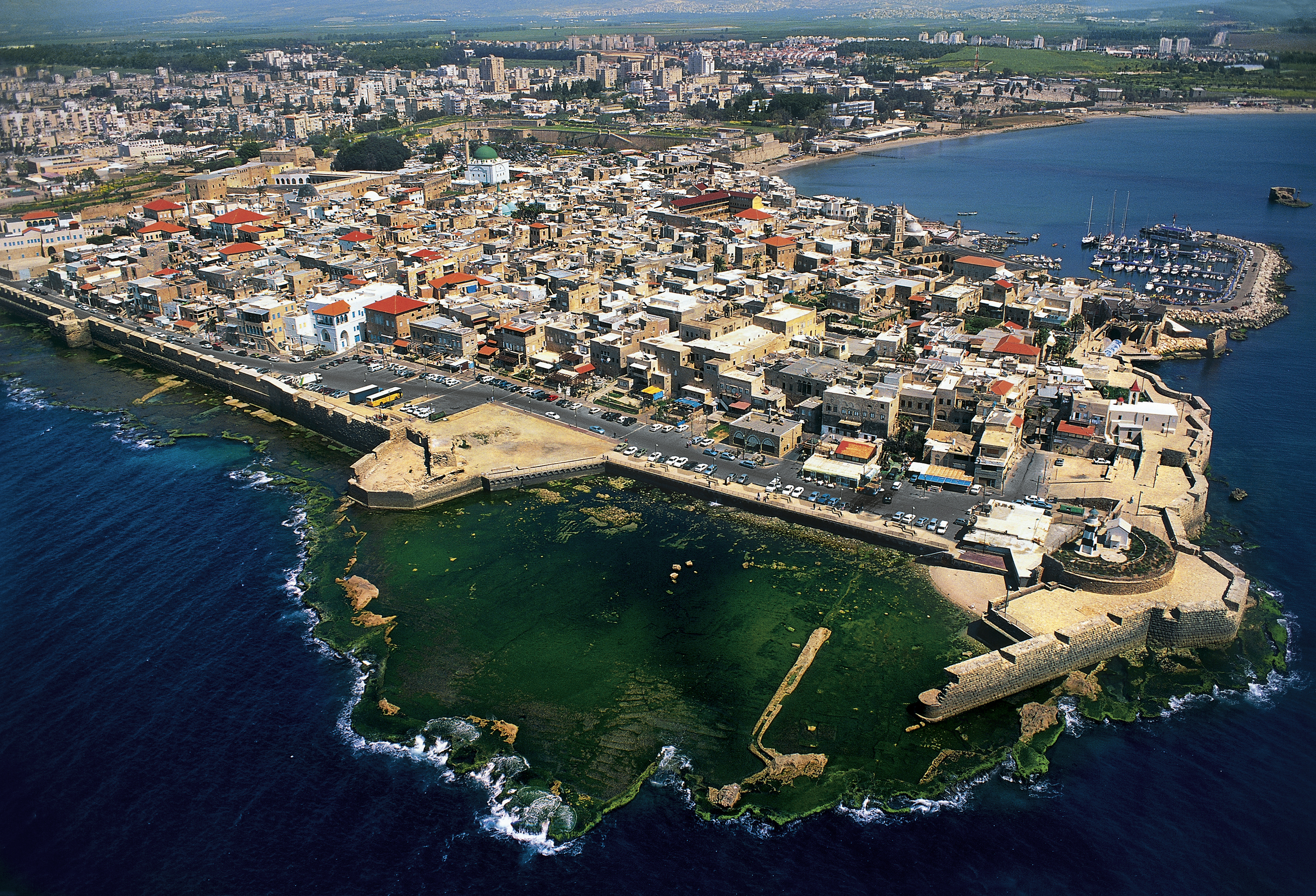
- Aerial view

- Crusader and Ottoman Sites in the Old City
- Coordinates: 32°55′17″N 35°4′8″E
- Country: Israel
- City: Acre

Old City of Acre
UNESCO World Heritage Site
- Location within Israel
- Location: Israel
- Criteria: II, III, V
- Reference: 1042
- Inscription: 2001 (25th Session)

The Old City of Acre is the historical center of Acre, in northern Israel. Known for its cultural, architectural, and social heritage, the Old City is a UNESCO World Heritage Site. It is an ancient port city, with a history dating back to the Bronze Age. Due to its location providing access to Israel, it was a significant port for centuries. The city experienced periods of prosperity and decline, frequently changing hands. It reached its peak in the late 12th and early 13th centuries as the capital of the Kingdom of Jerusalem. From the 19th century, its importance diminished in favor of the nearby port city of Haifa. The Old City, along with its seaport, is surrounded by historic defensive walls. The present city reflects characteristics of Ottoman settlements from the 18th and 19th centuries, featuring typical structures such as a citadel, remnants of a moat, mosques, bathhouses, and a caravanserai. The remains of the Crusader city lie largely intact both above and below the current street level, preserving a medieval street layout. The ensemble of Acre's monuments has been inscribed on the UNESCO World Heritage List since 2001.

== Monuments ==
Since 1990, archaeological and conservation work has been ongoing in Acre, overseen by the Old Acre Development Company Ltd., established in 1967. These efforts are coordinated under the Israel Ministry of Tourism. The company collaborates with municipal authorities, acting as a government agency to supervise public and private construction in the Old City and advise on development matters. Through published research, the Old City has gained prominence as a major tourist destination. The historic urban ensemble within the defensive walls holds historical, cultural, and touristic value. In 2001, the Old City of Acre's monuments were inscribed on the UNESCO World Heritage List.

=== Defensive walls ===
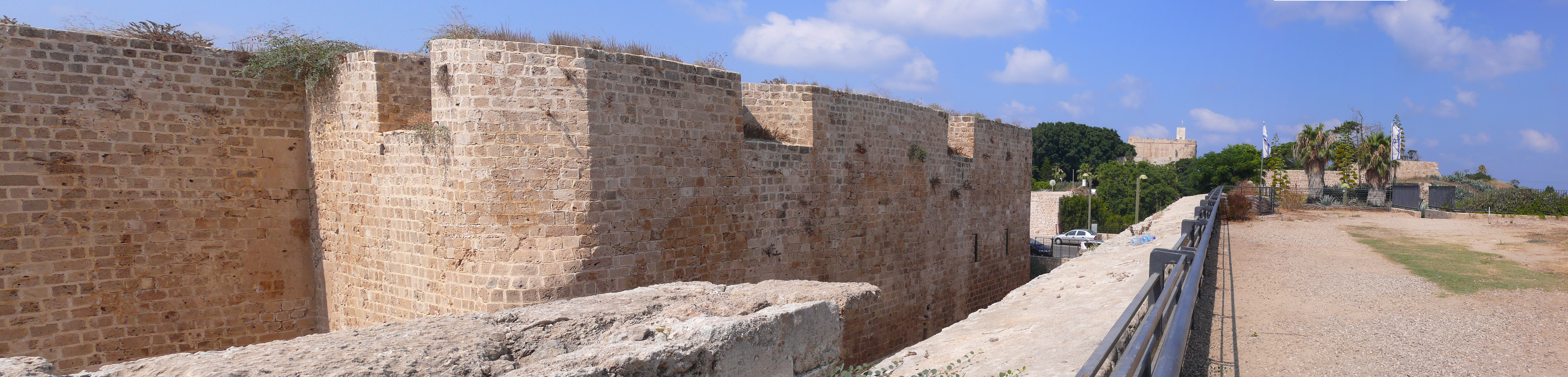
Panorama of Acre's defensive walls

Acre's fortification system was developed over centuries. During the Crusades, the Old City was larger, with different wall alignments. The current walls, built between 1750 and 1814, date to the Ottoman period. The first wall was constructed by Zahir al-Umar between 1750 and 1751, hastily built using remnants of Crusader walls in many cases. Upon completion, the wall encircled the city from both land and sea, standing 10–13 meters high and up to 1 meter thick. The eastern side featured the "Land Gate", and the southern side had the "Sea Gate" leading to the port. The walls were reinforced by Jazzar Pasha between 1775 and 1779, with further work continuing until 1814, focusing on resistance to artillery fire. Acre's defensive walls form a permanent fortification in an irregular pentagon shape, comprising three main wall lines reinforced with a moat, counterscarp, towers, and bastions. Today, the preserved fortifications surround the Old City on all sides, with sections along the shoreline serving as reinforced breakwaters. The land fortifications consist of a thick city wall, a dry moat, a defensive bastion, and four artillery towers. Originally, entry was possible only through the Land Gate from the east or the Sea Gate at the port. For practical reasons, two additional passages have been created in the walls, leading north.

The city walls begin at the northwestern corner of the Old City at the Vineyard Tower (Arabic: Burj al-Kurayim, also known as the British Fortress). East of it, a new passage was created for Hagana Street. The walls extend eastward, passing north of the citadel's fortifications and reaching a second new passage for Haim Weizmann Street. Beyond this, the walls pass north of the arsenal and reach the Commander's Tower (Arabic: Burj al-Kumandar), a squat defensive bastion with multiple artillery positions guarding the northeastern corner of Acre's Old City. From its summit, there is a view of Haifa Bay and Mount Carmel above Haifa. Nearby is the Treasures in the Walls Museum, showcasing the city's historical heritage with hundreds of artifacts, including furniture, textiles, and artistic and religious vessels. The walls then turn south, where stairs lead to a promenade with cannons from the Napoleonic era. The third defensive tower, the Gate Tower (Arabic: Kapu Burj), guarded the Land Gate, now accessed via Jehonatan HaHashmonai Street. The walls then turn west along the city beach, reaching the sea's edge and turning south toward the fishing port and marina. At the former Sea Gate, now the Abu Christo restaurant, a seaside promenade begins, leading to the Flag Tower (Arabic: Burj as-Sanjaq), a bastion guarding the southwestern corner, home to the Akko Light. The walls then turn north, passing two defensive towers, Burj al-Kishla and Al-Khadid Burj, before returning to the Vineyard Tower.

Defensive walls of Acre
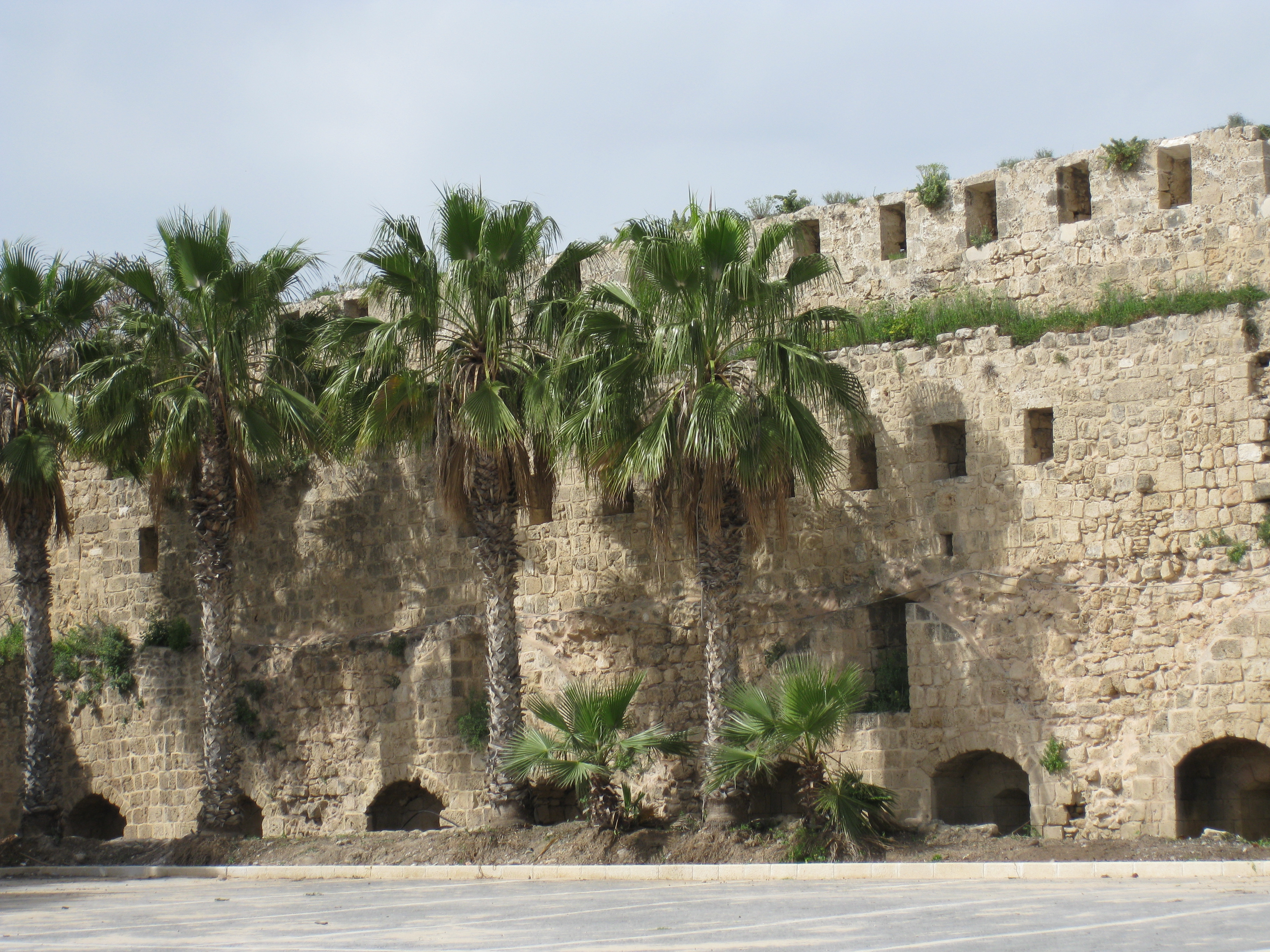
Walls of Acre

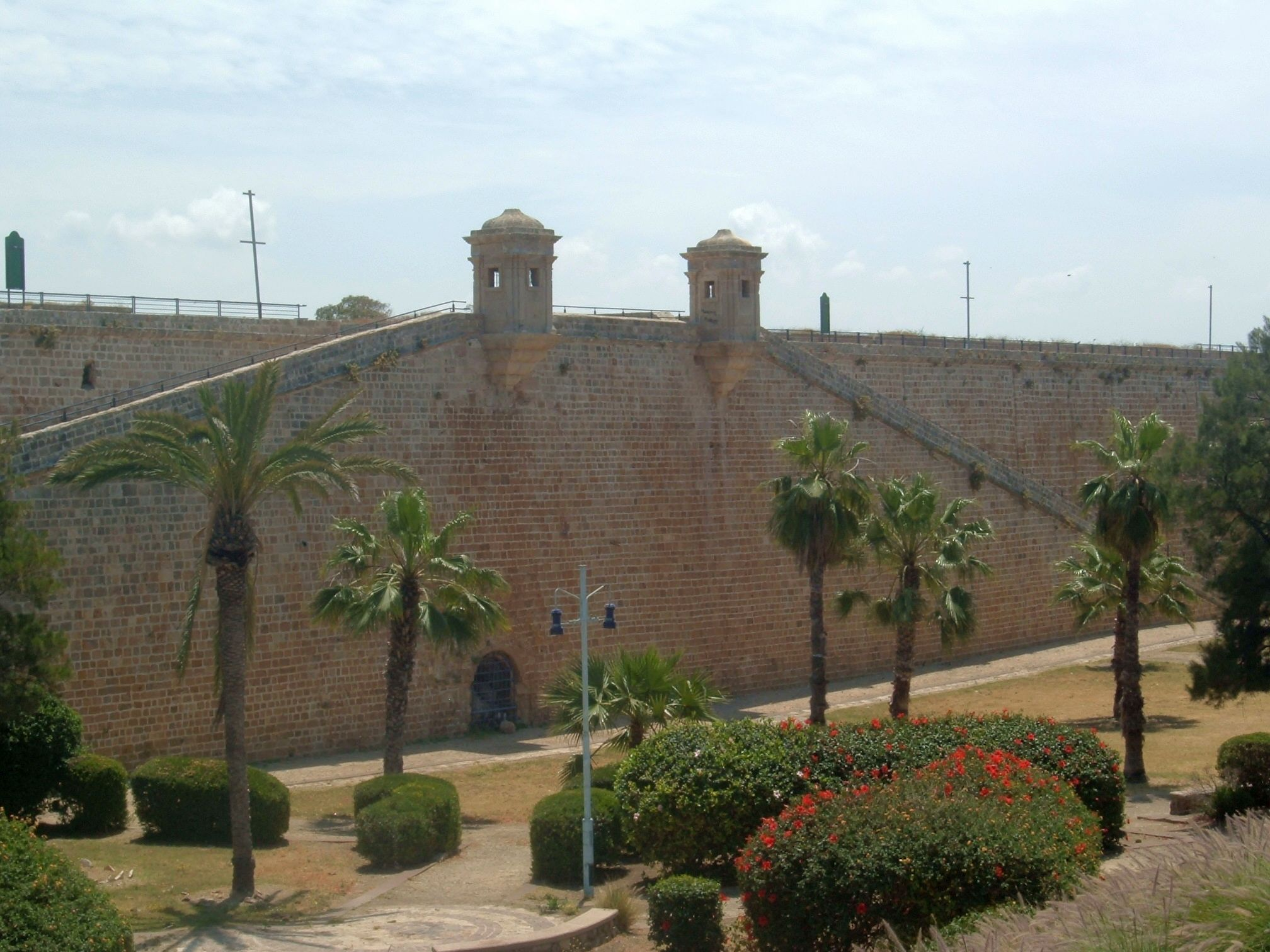
Towers of Acre's defensive walls

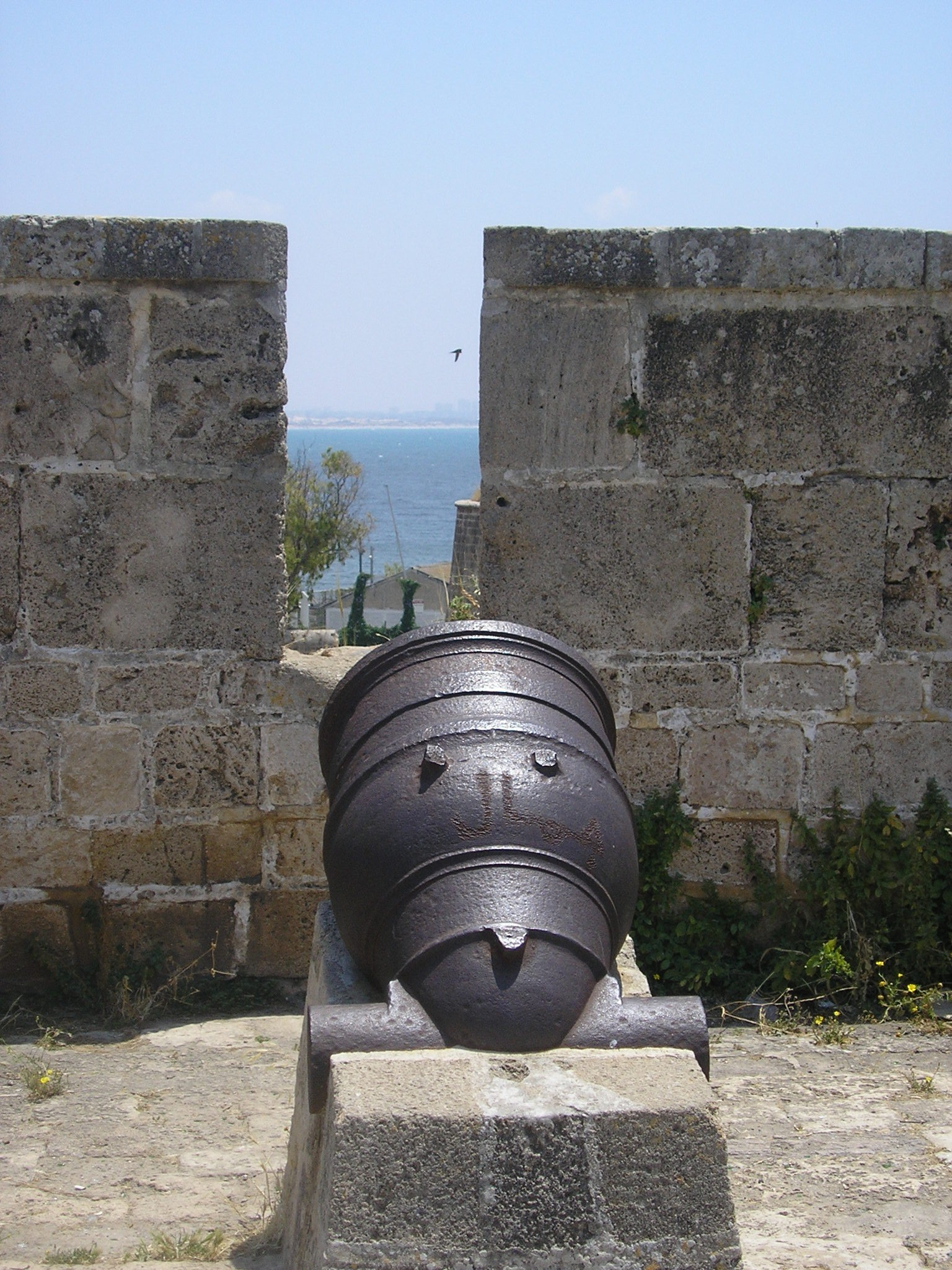
Section of Acre's city fortifications

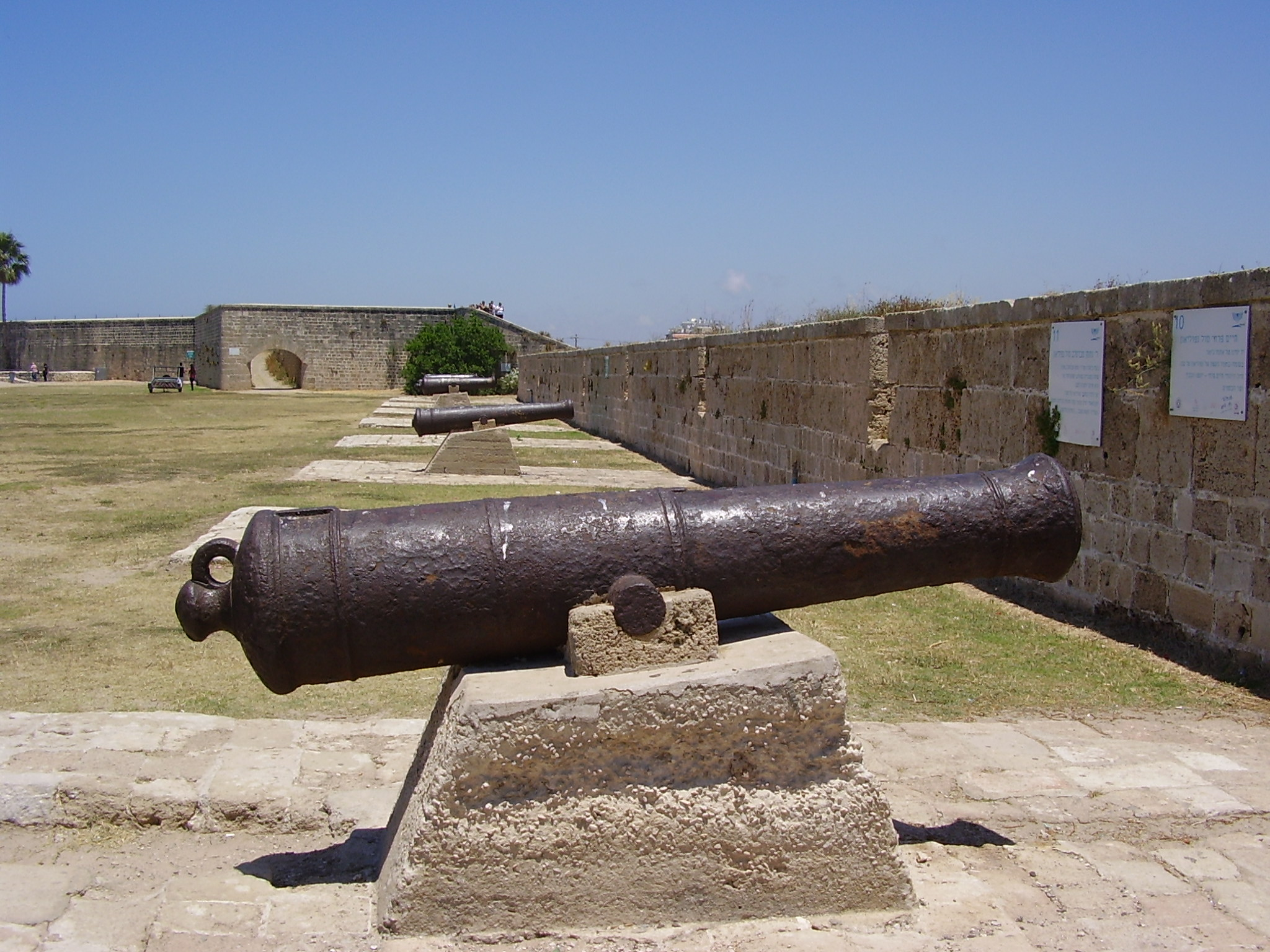
Cannons displayed on Acre's walls

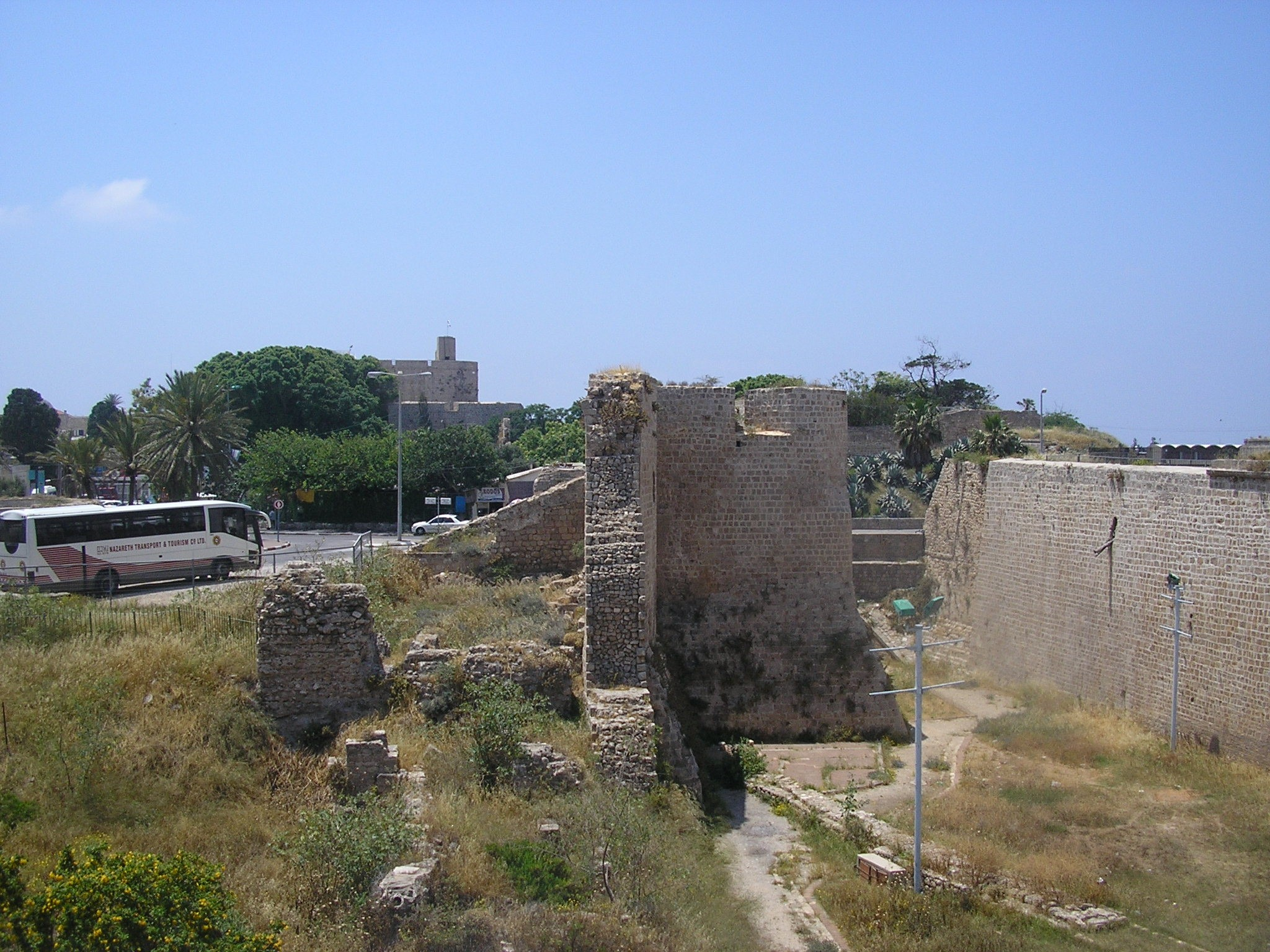
Defensive walls of Acre

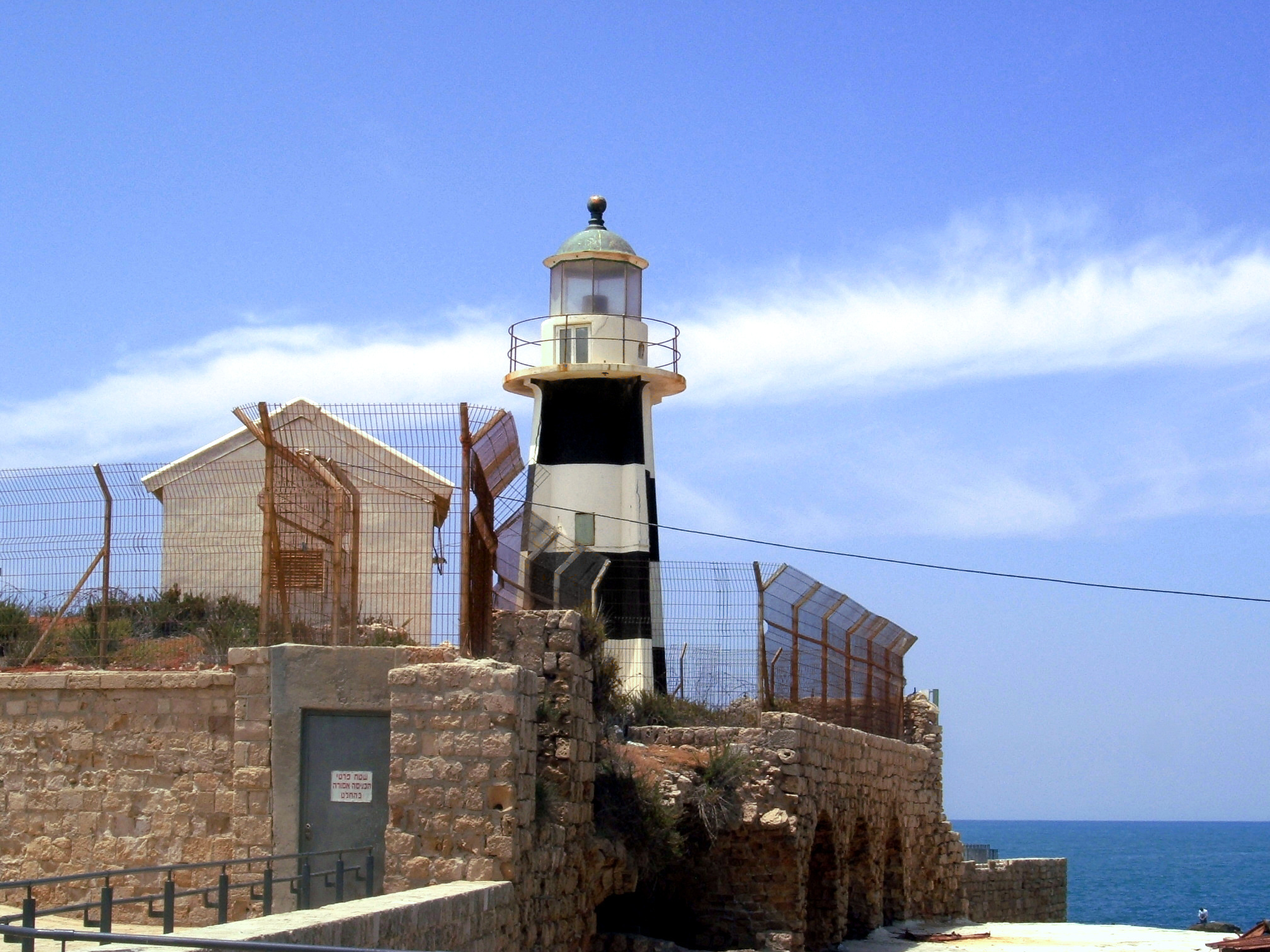
Akko Light built on the city's defensive walls

=== Citadel ===
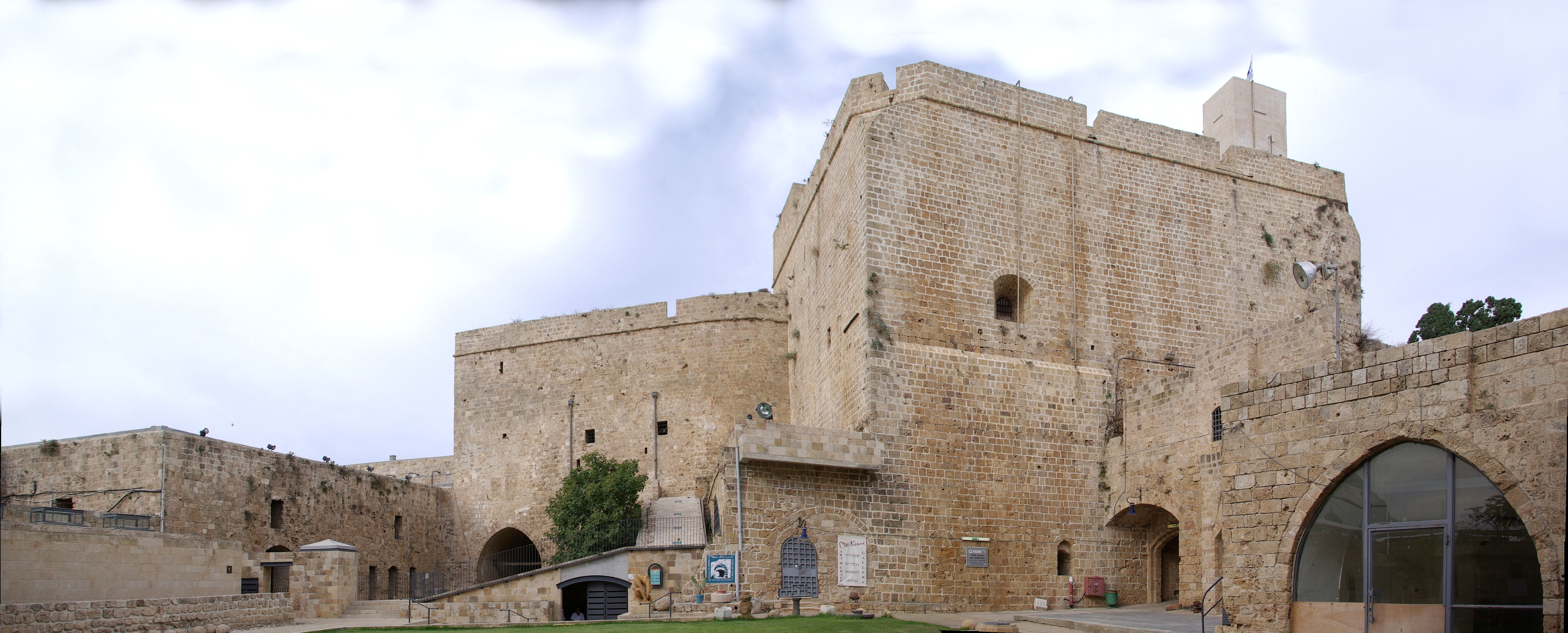
Panorama of Acre's citadel

In the northern part of the Old City stands the citadel, built between 1775 and 1805 by Jazzar Pasha on the foundations of an older Crusader fortress. On its northern side, the citadel integrates with the defensive walls at the Treasury Tower (Arabic: Burj al-Hazana), with a view of the Old City and Haifa Bay. East of the tower, a Crusader-era garden has been recreated in front of the Visitor Center entrance. The citadel features two inner courtyards, measuring 170 meters east to west and about 100 meters wide. In the 1920s, the British repurposed the citadel as a prison.

Today, the citadel's primary attraction is the Museum of Underground Prisoners, dedicated to the Jewish resistance during the Mandatory Palestine. Exhibits include artifacts from nine executed Jewish fighters and a prison gallows. One display is a model depicting a 1947 prisoner escape. Adjacent is the Okashi Art Museum, showcasing works by Israeli painter Absalom Okashi.

=== Underground Crusader city ===
Beneath the citadel and former British prison, a complex of underground halls used by the Knights Hospitaller was discovered. Buried under rubble since 1291, these halls were recently unearthed through archaeological work. The current city level is 8 meters above the Crusader era, placing the fortress deep underground. The fortress comprises four wings surrounding an open Courtyard spanning 1,200 m². In the northern part is a 4-meter-deep well. Two plastered pools, likely for drinking water (northern) and washing (southern), are also present. The courtyard is surrounded by arches supporting stairs to an upper level. The northern wing, parallel to the city's northern walls, played a main defensive role, housing nine long halls across two floors used as warehouses and a rainwater reservoir fed from the fortress roof. These halls feature 10-meter-high barrel vaults, with external stone walls 3.5 meters thick. The Sugar Refinery Hall was a three-story building, with a large rainwater reservoir on the lower level comprising two connected 7.5-meter-high pools. The main hall above, 7 meters high, contained hundreds of clay vessels used for sugar production, giving the hall its name. Remnants of a tower, gate, and sewage channel remain on the northern side. The western wing, partially excavated, appears to have two floors with 30 residential rooms per level. One feature is the Columned Hall, a 10-meter-long dining hall with a ribbed vault supported by three 3-meter-diameter stone columns. The eastern wing includes unexcavated kitchen areas, while the Pillar Hall, a 35×40-meter chamber covering 1,400 m², has a cross-vaulted ceiling on square pillars, used for knightly meetings and ceremonies. The southern wing forms a city street with a stone gate, featuring rare Crusader heraldic symbols. A vaulted hall with three rounded columns lies nearby. A marked tourist route leads to the Hospitaller chapter house, a narrow corridor to the refectory or crypt, and steep stairs to a long, narrow passage of unknown purpose connecting to the Crusader hospital. Some underground areas are periodically closed for ongoing archaeological work.

Underground Crusader city
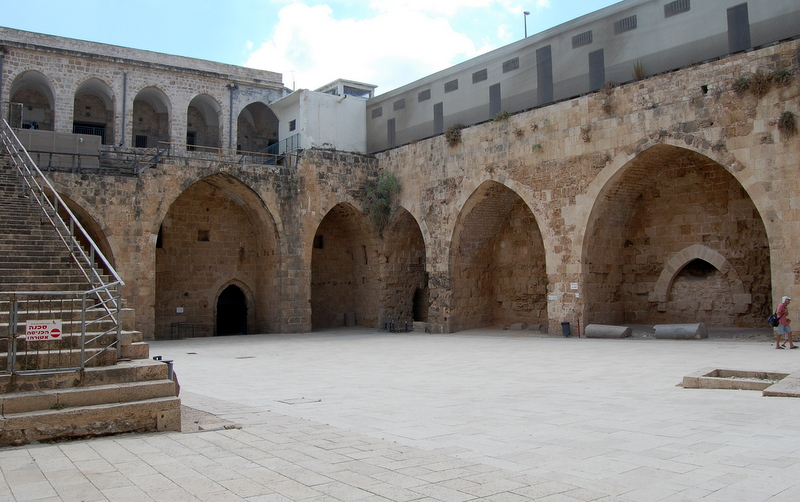
Courtyard of the Crusader fortress in Acre

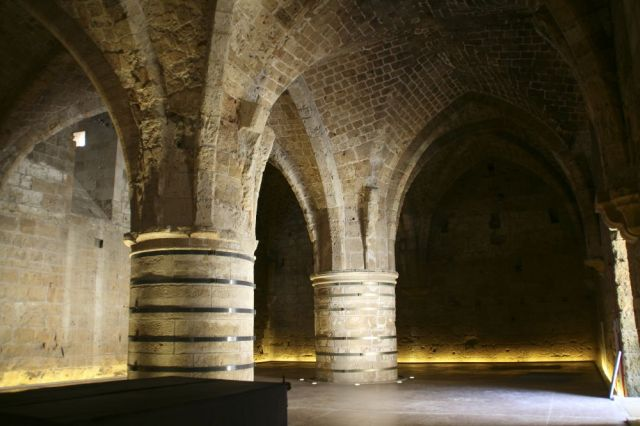
Underground Crusader city in Acre

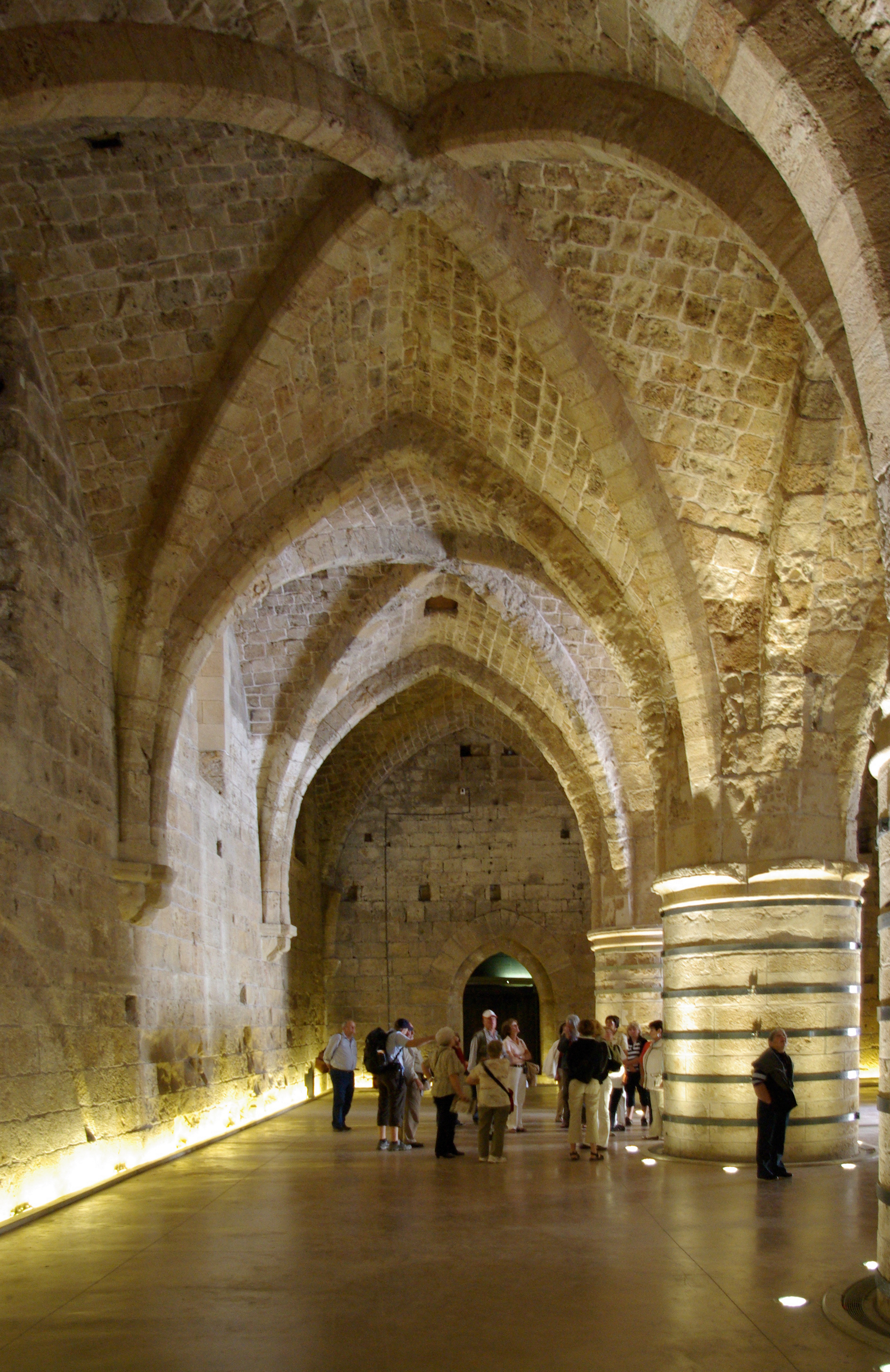
Underground Crusader city in Acre

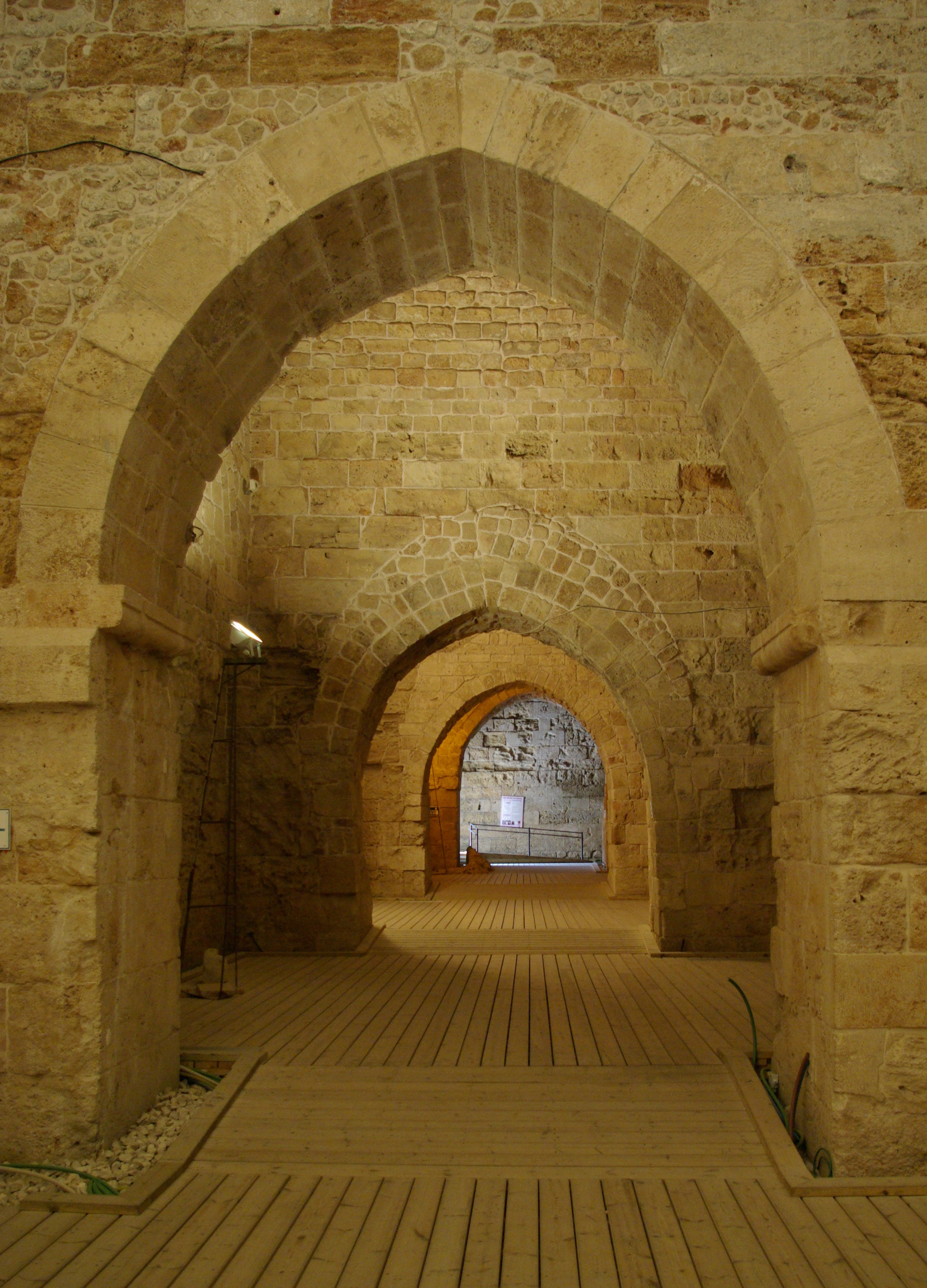
Underground Crusader city in Acre

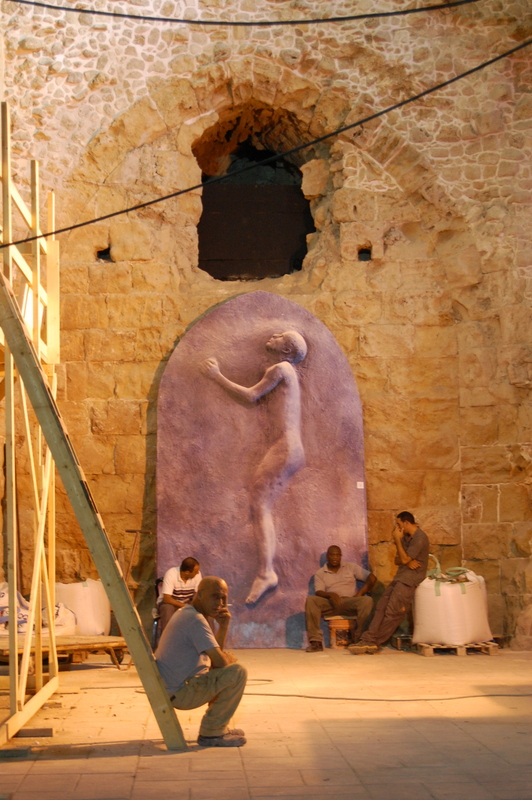
Underground Crusader city in Acre

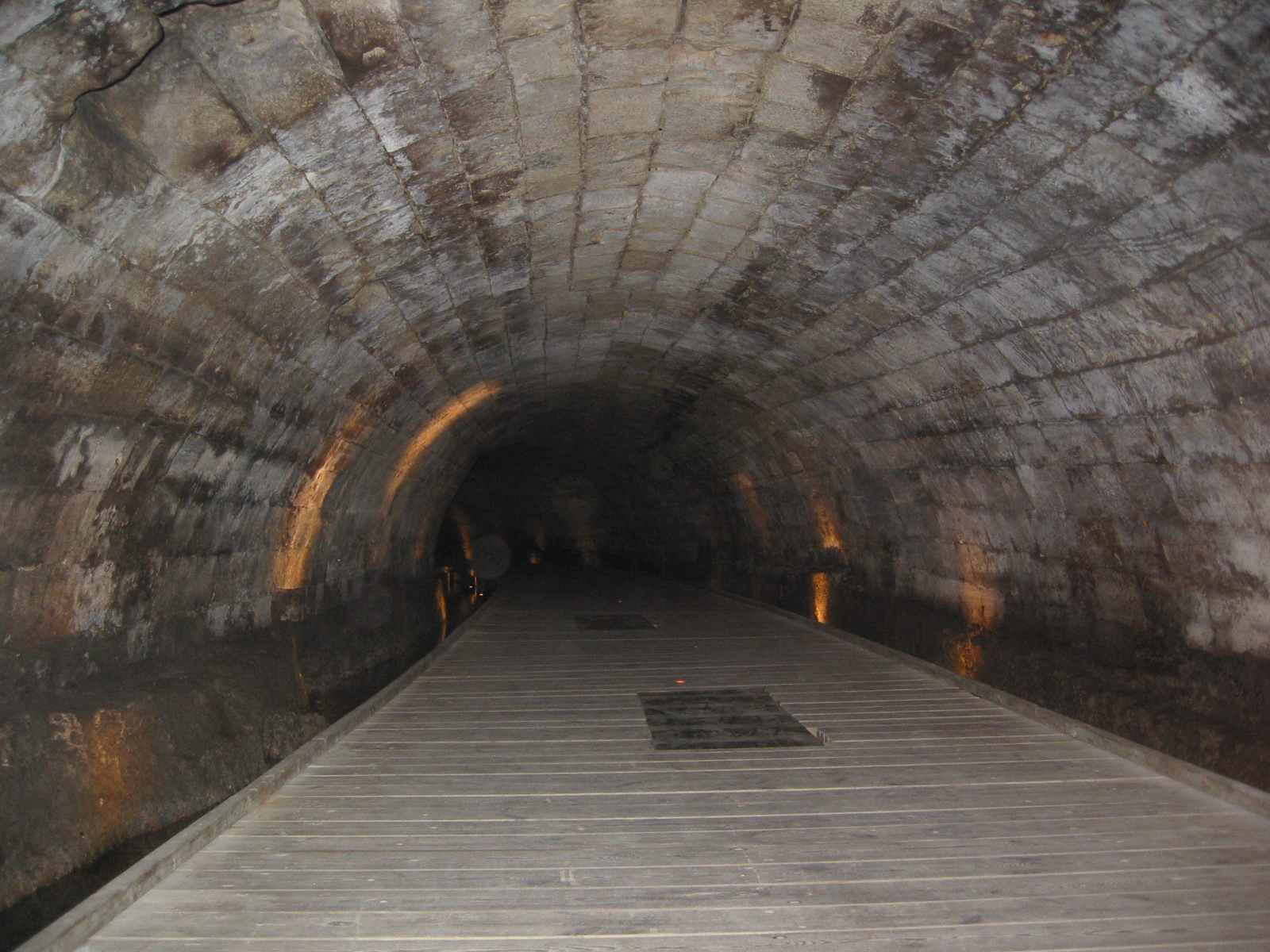
Underground Crusader city in Acre

=== Old saraya ===
The old saraya lies south of the citadel, a two-story structure with an open, paved rectangular courtyard. Built in the 18th century on the ruins of the Church of St. John the Baptist, it served as Jazzar Pasha's private residence. After he constructed a new palace, the serai housed civil administrative offices. In the early 19th century, Ibrahim Pasha used it as a treasury, and it later became the governor's residence.

Old saraya of Acre
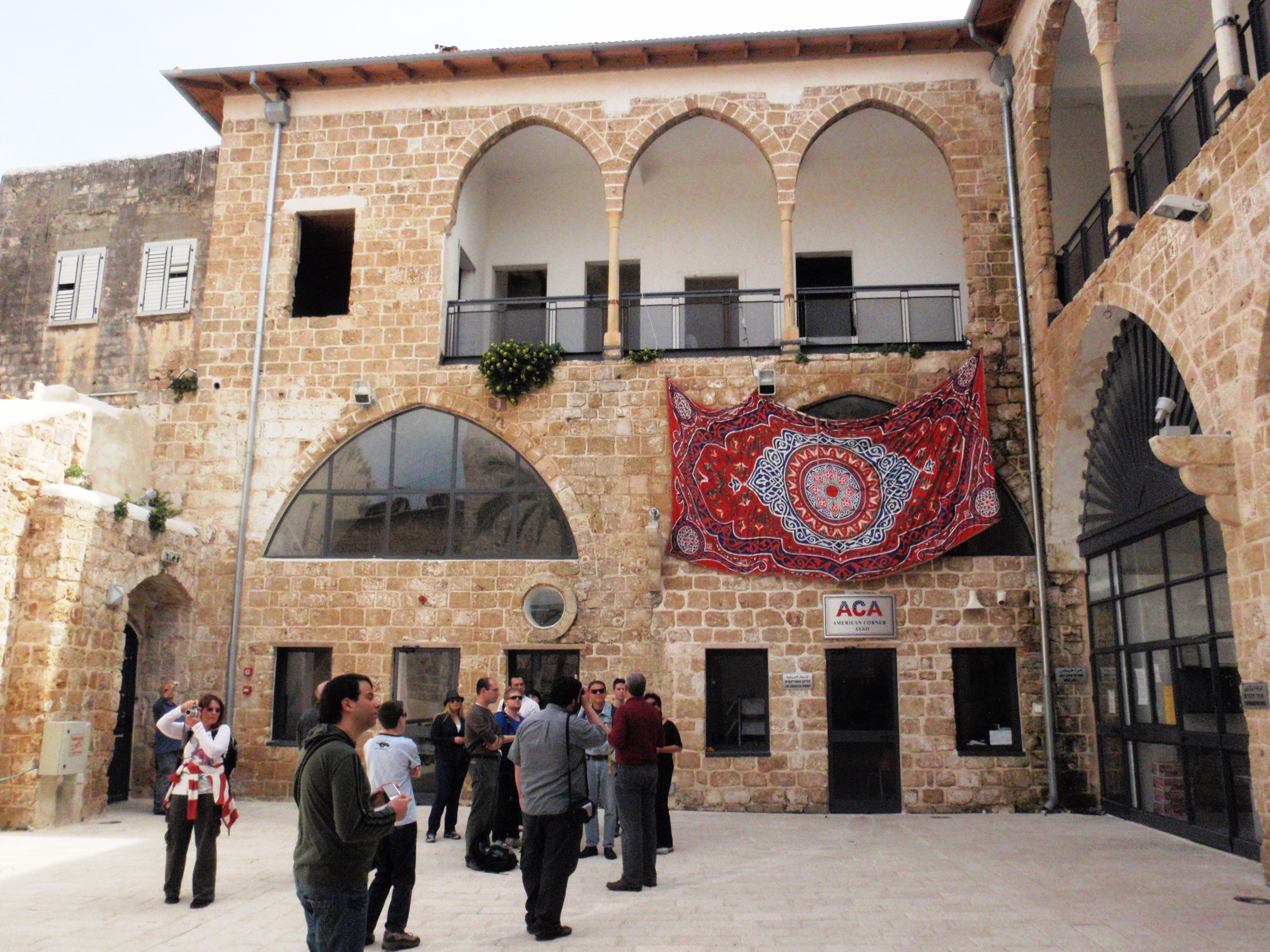

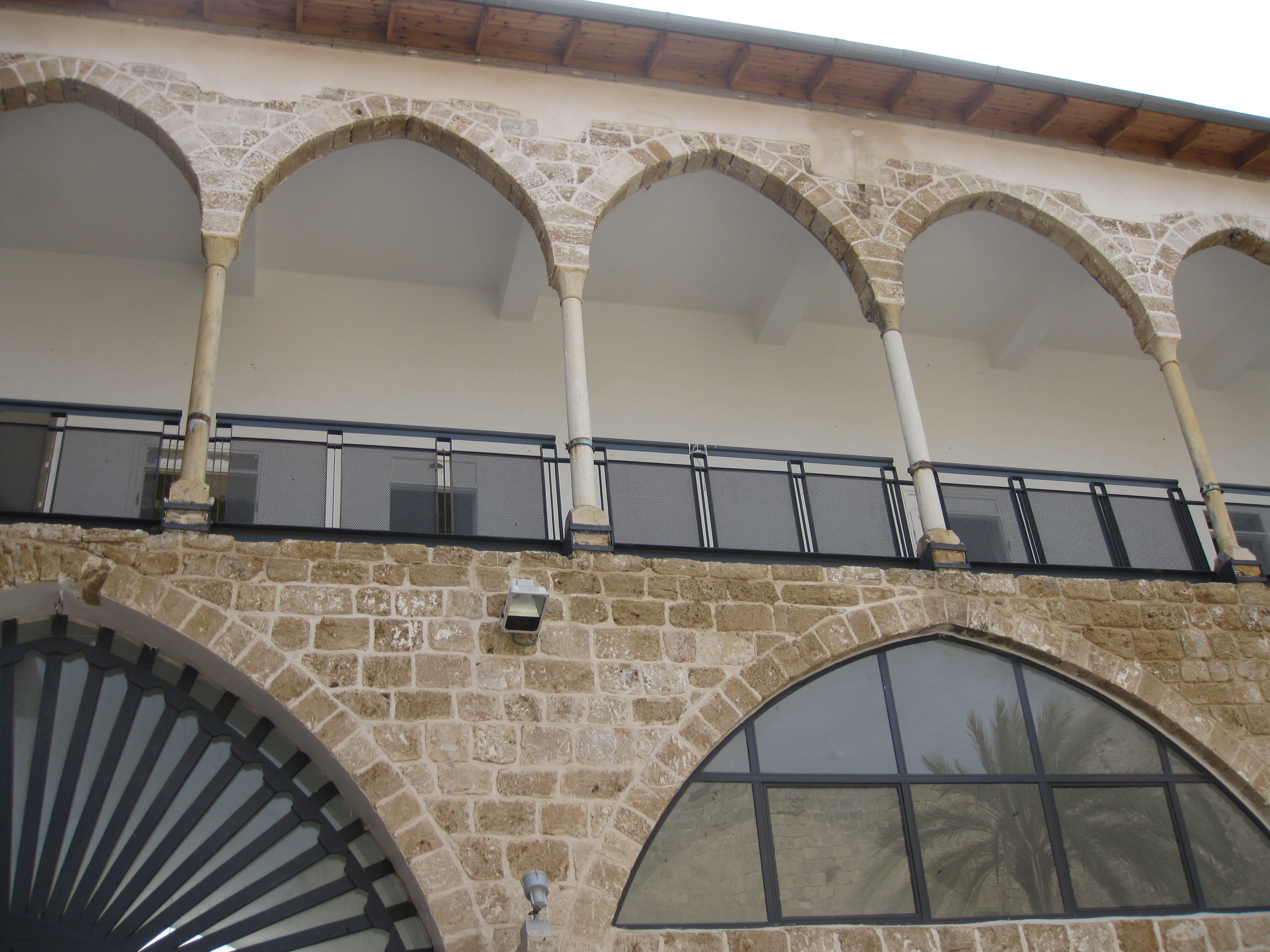

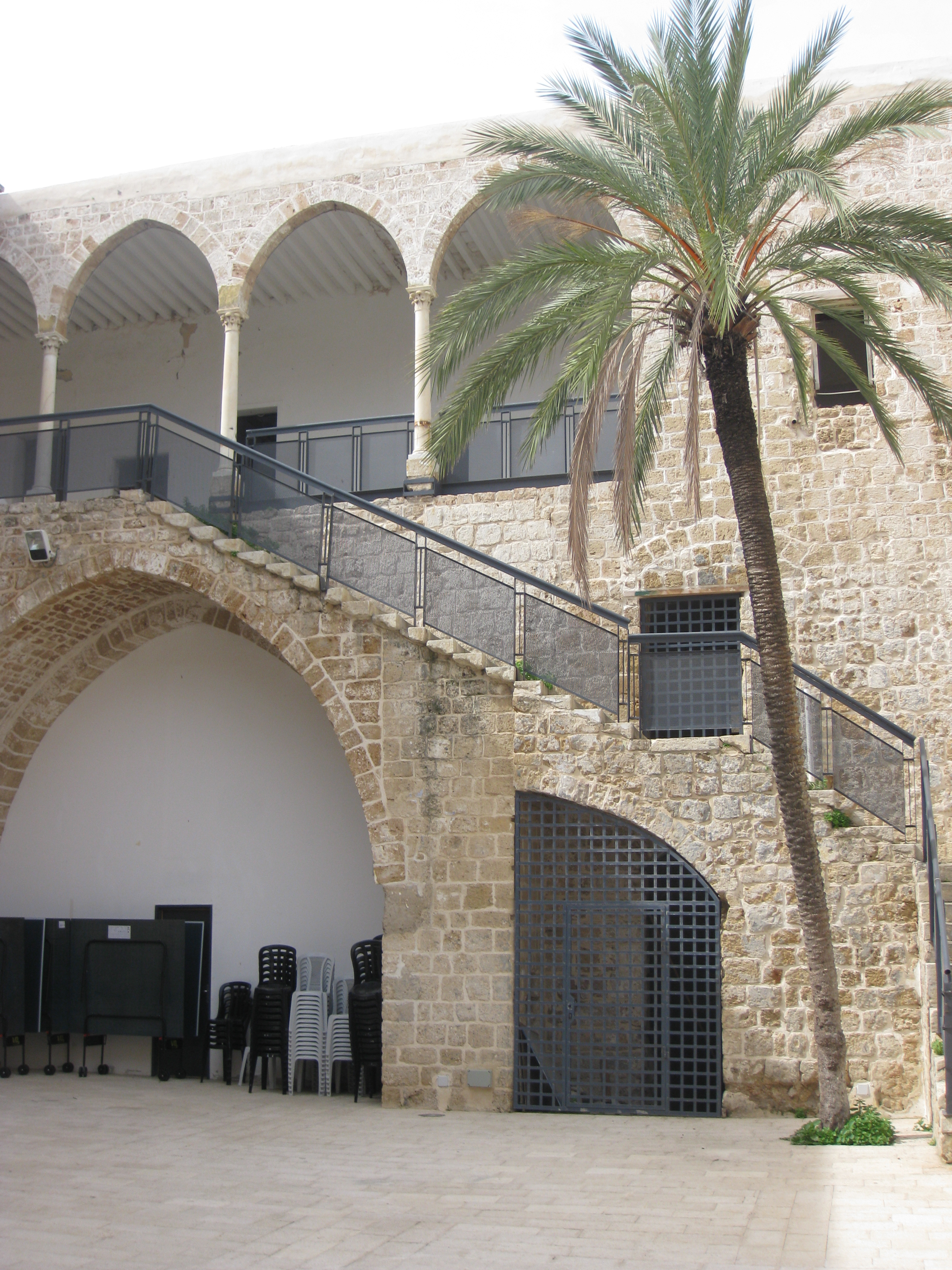

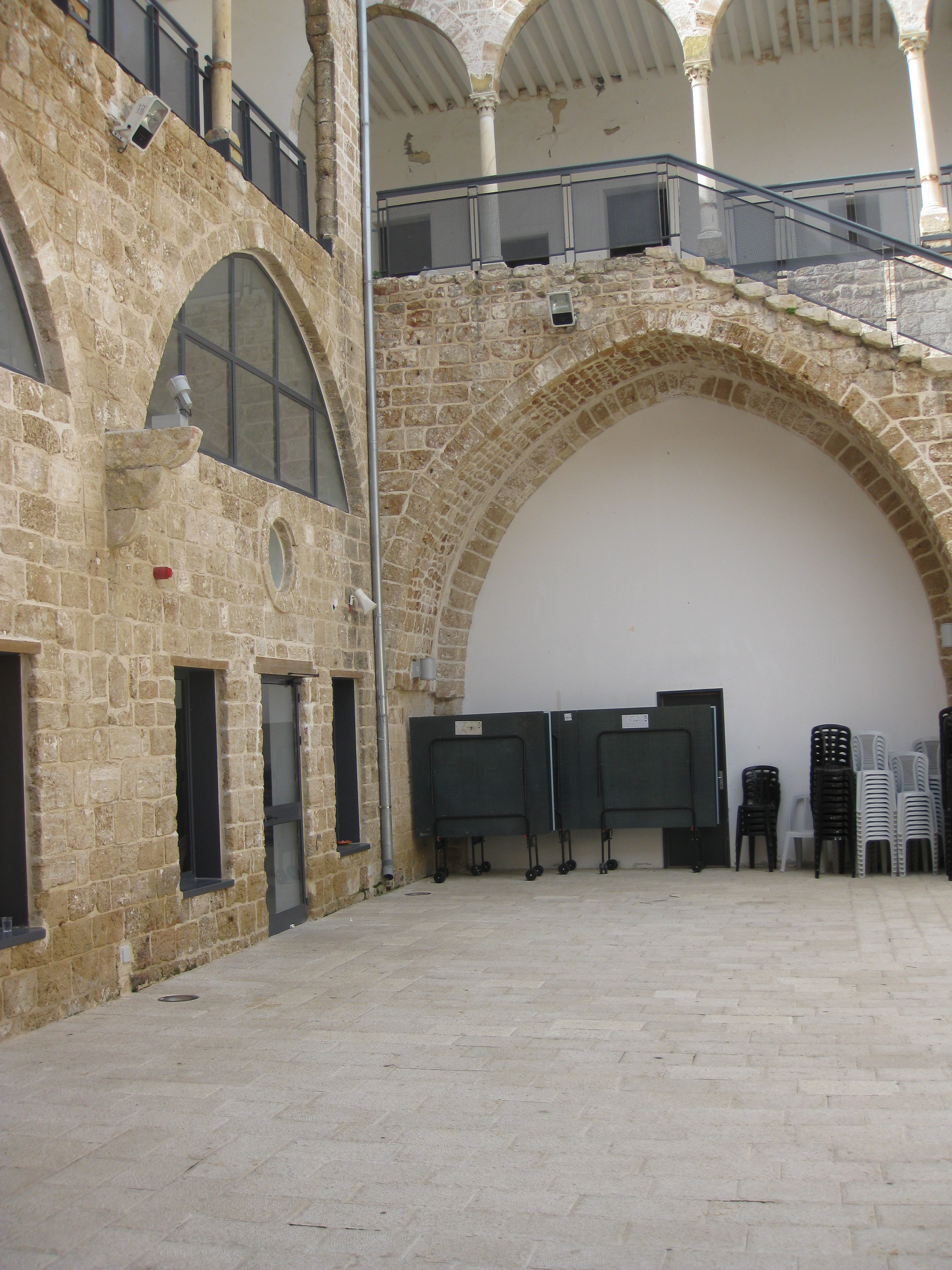

=== Synagogues of Acre ===
The Jewish community maintains two synagogues in Acre: the Ramchal Synagogue and the Or Torah Synagogue. The Ramchal Synagogue, located in the heart of the Old City, is named after Rabbi Ramchal, who lived in Acre from 1743 to 1747. In 1758, Bedouin ruler Zahir al-Umar seized it, converting it into the al-Mu'allak Mosque. As compensation, the Jewish community received a small building north of the mosque. In the early 21st century, the synagogue was renovated and opened to tourists. Near the Old City's outer walls is the Tunisian Synagogue, also known as Or Torah. Legend claims that after the Second Temple's destruction in 70 CE, priests arrived in Acre, founding the El-Zaira Jewish quarter and placing salvaged Temple doors in the synagogue. Its interior is decorated with mosaics.

Synagogues of Acre
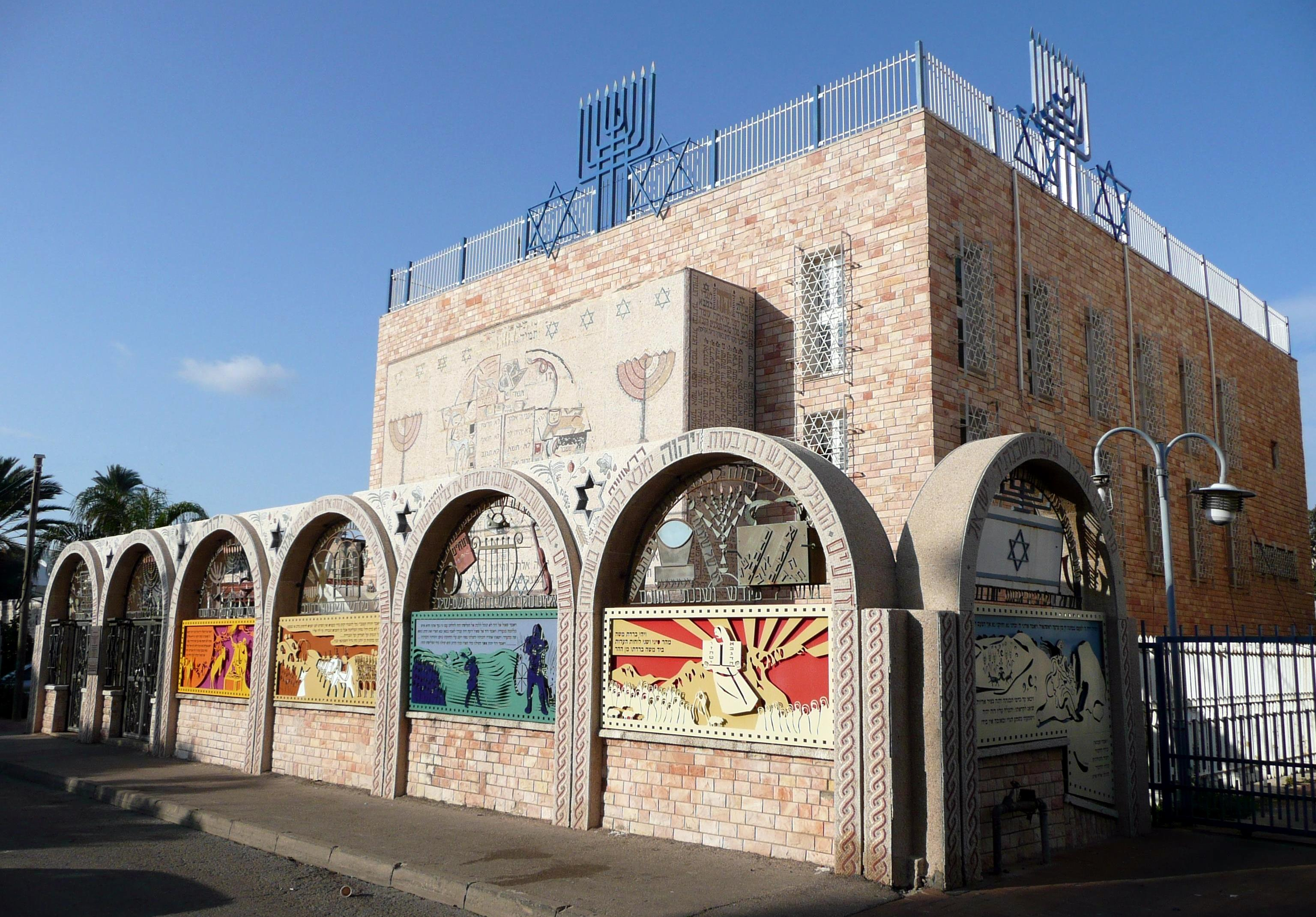
Or Torah Synagogue

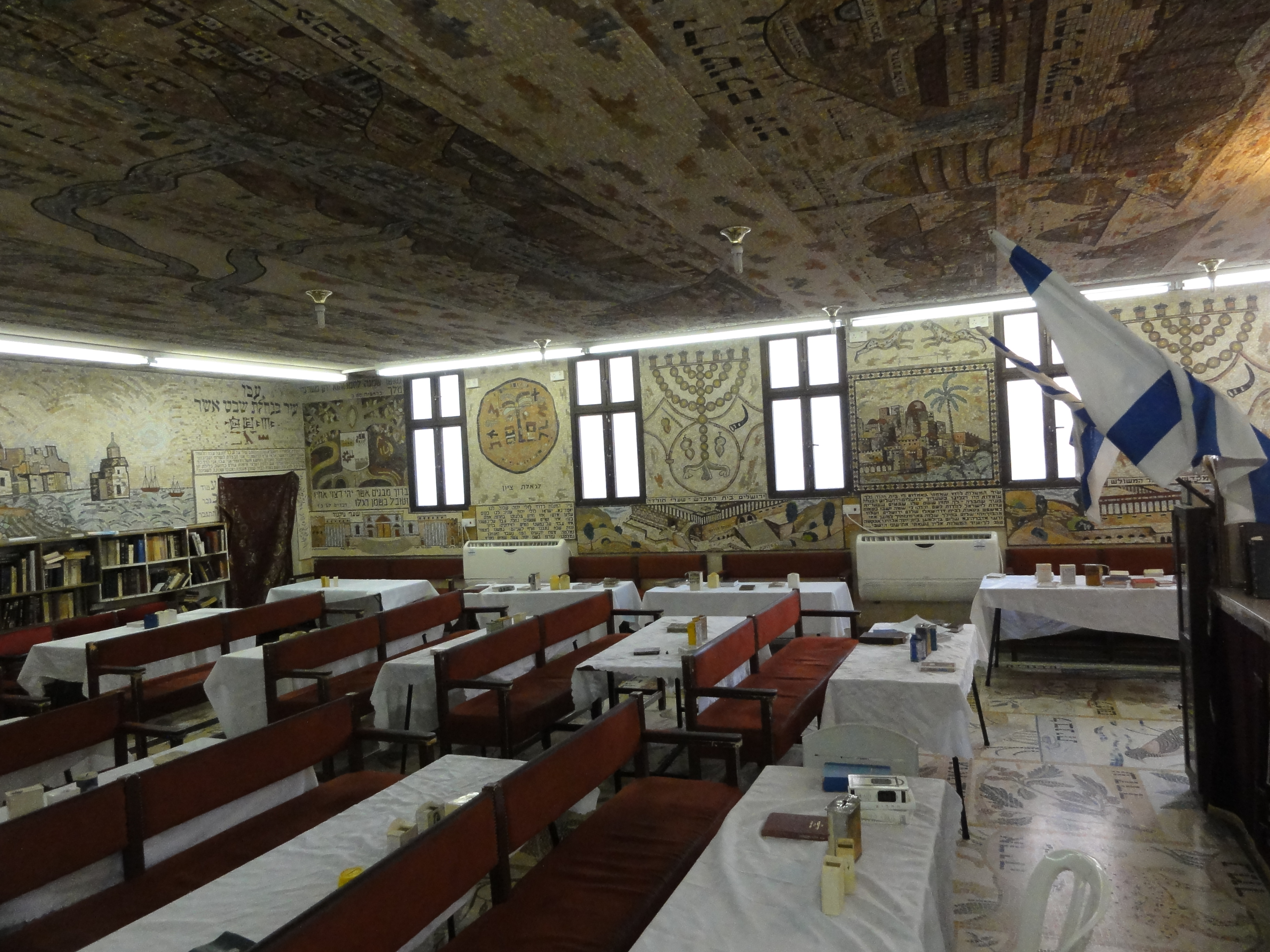
Interior of Or Torah Synagogue

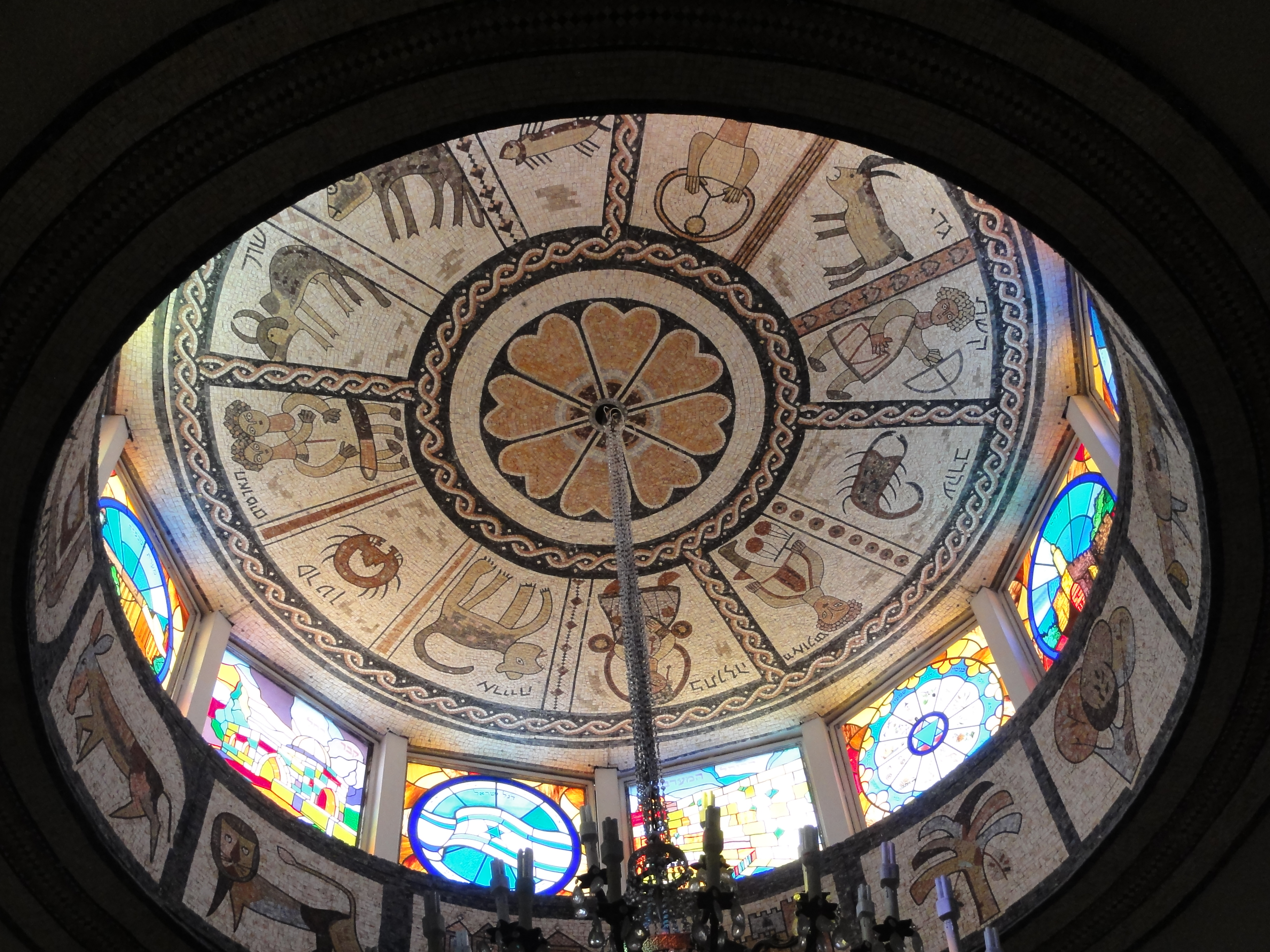
Or Torah Synagogue, dome with zodiac mosaic copied after ancient one at Beth Alpha

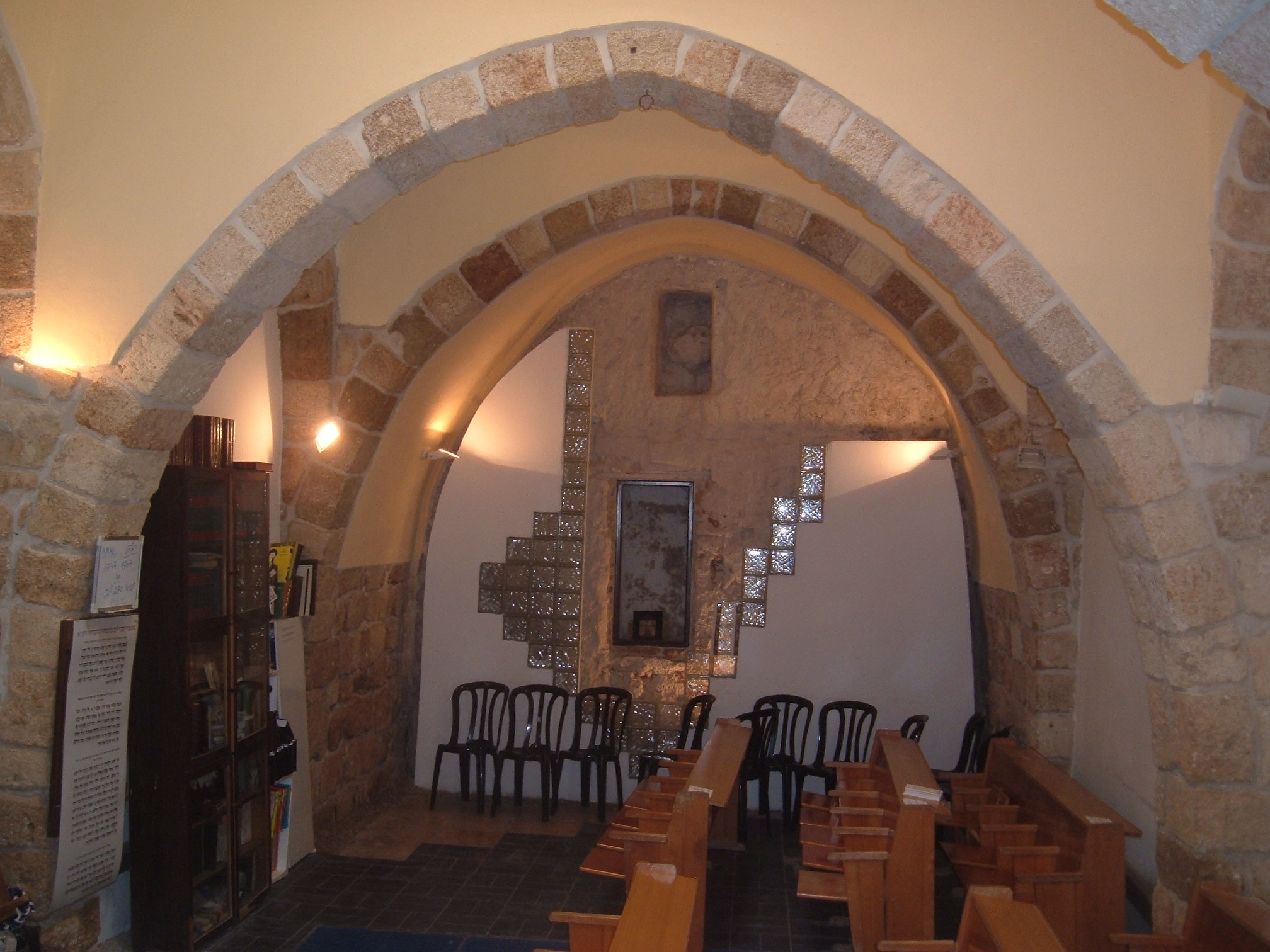
Interior of Ramchal Synagogue

=== Christian Churches in Acre ===
Christian churches are mostly concentrated in the southwestern part of Acre's Old City. Historical records and 13th-century maps indicate that the Carmelites had a church near the sea. After the Crusaders left in 1291, the Carmelites departed, returning in the early 17th century to reestablish a church. Acre holds significance for the Franciscans, who believe their founder, Francis of Assisi, visited between 1219 and 1220. In 1217, Father Elia Da Cortona founded the first Franciscan monastery there. After Muslim conquest, the Franciscans fled, returning in 1620 to establish the Terra Sancta Church, the only church in the eastern Old City. Saint George Greek Orthodox Cathedral, built before 1631 in the Greek Orthodox tradition, is considered the oldest Christian church in Acre. Further south are the Maronite Church, the Carmelite church and monastery dedicated to the Dome of Nazareth, and a Greek Catholic church, Church of Saint Andrew. Near the lighthouse stands Saint John the Baptist Church, a Franciscan church built in 1737 and renovated in 1947, the only active Roman Catholic church in Acre.

Churches of Acre
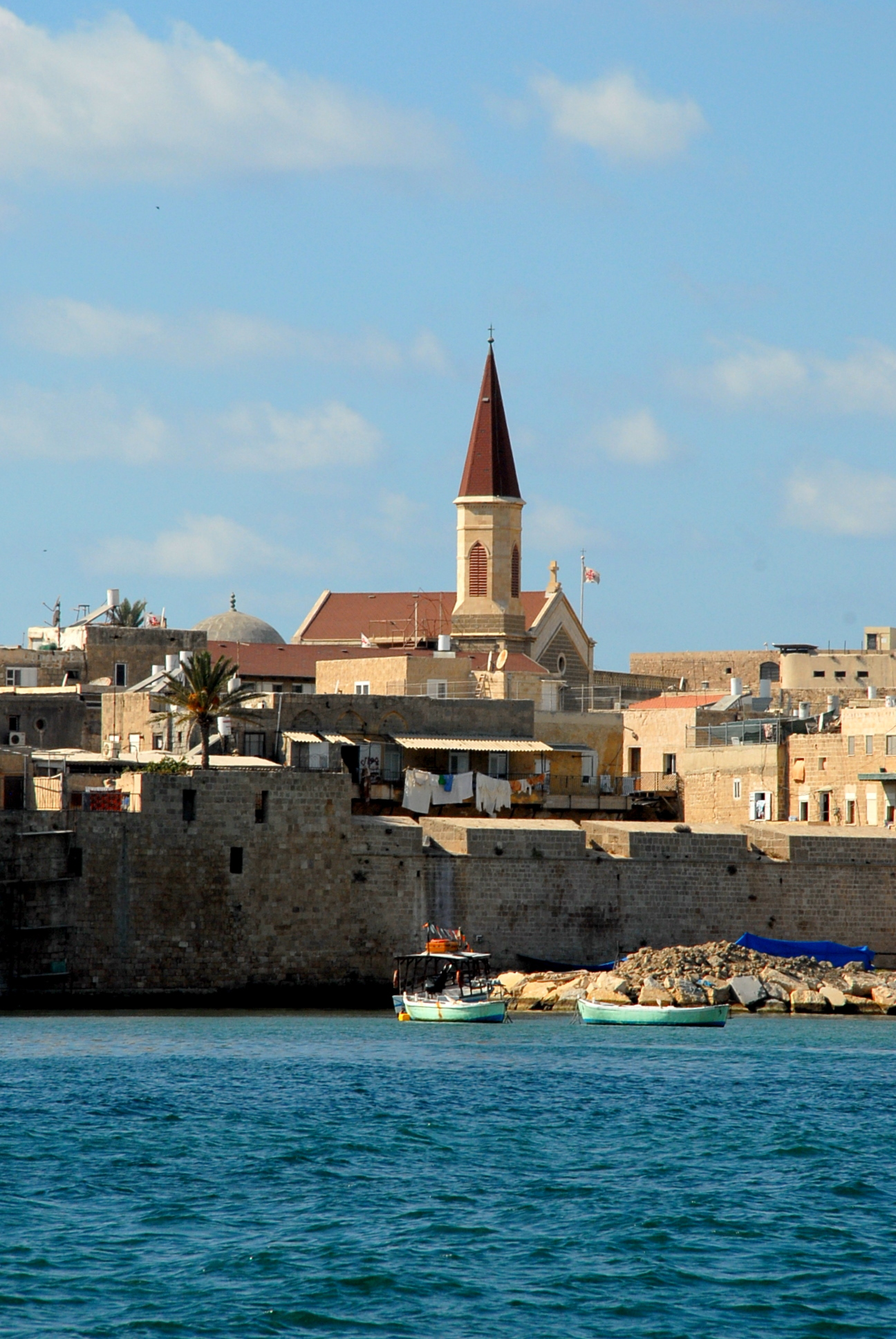
Terra Sancta Church

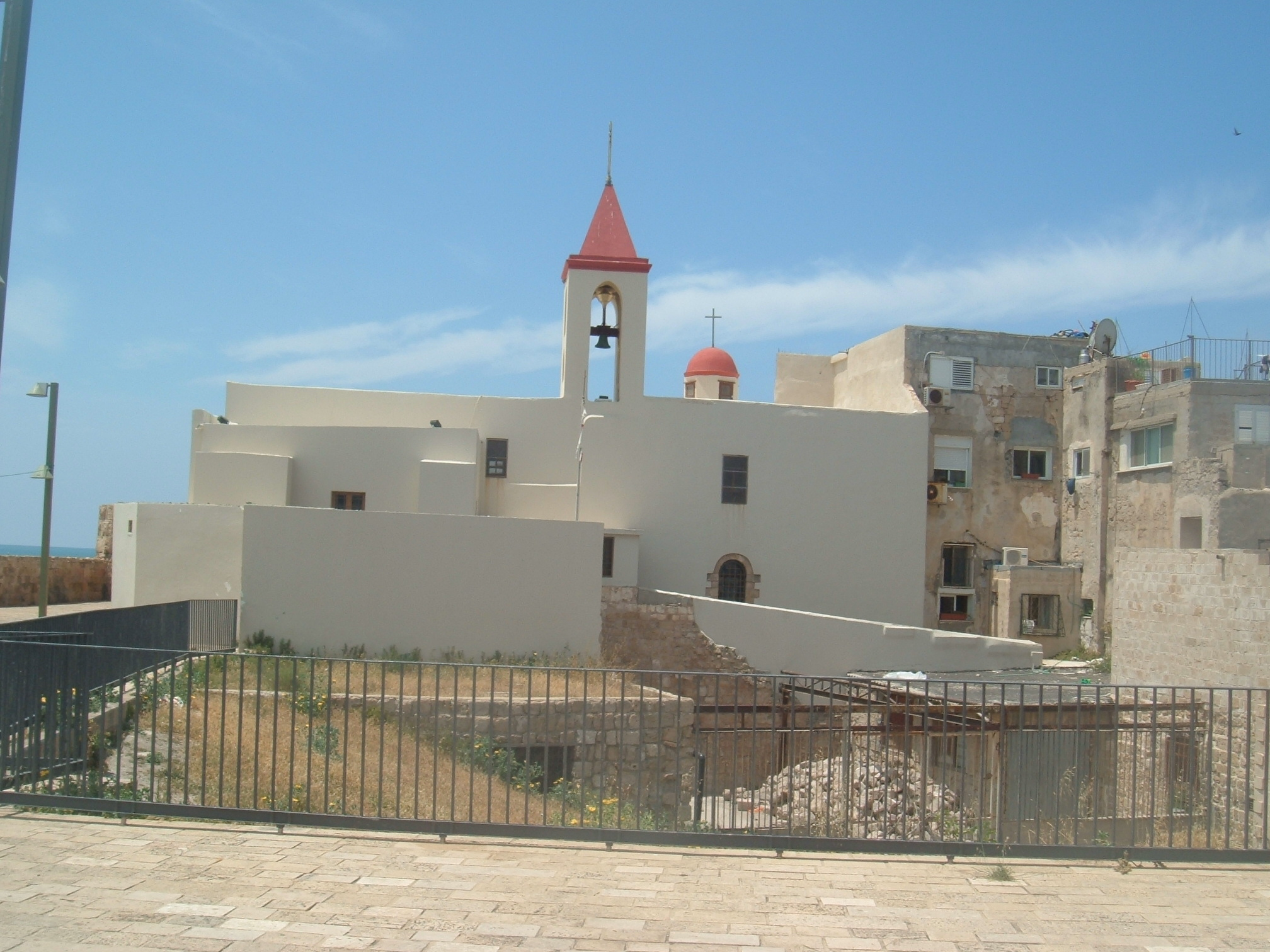
Saint John the Baptist Church

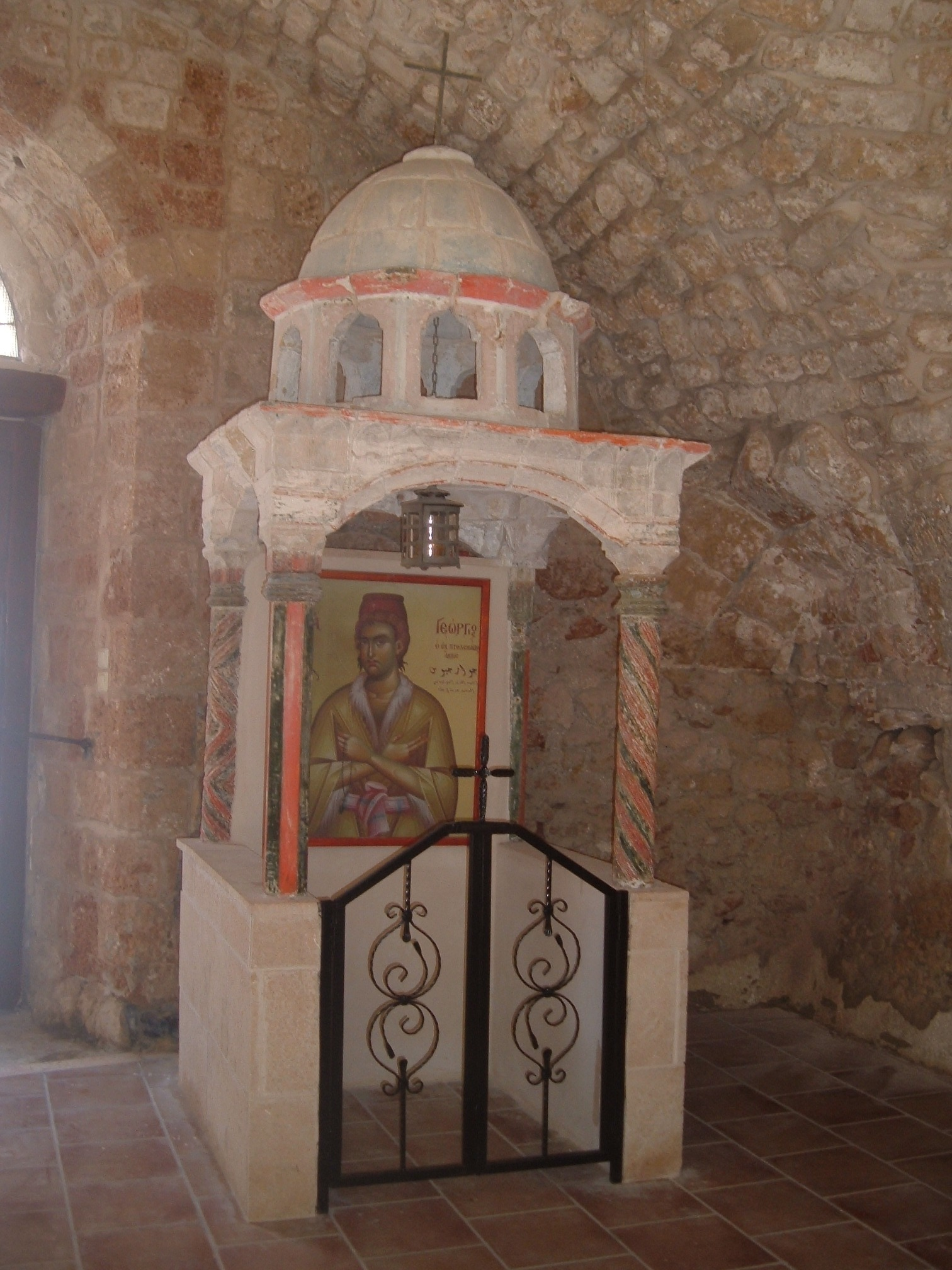
Interior of Saint George Greek Orthodox Cathedral

=== Mosques of Acre ===
Among the sacred sites in Acre's Old City, Muslim mosques are the most numerous. The oldest, the El-Bahr Mosque, built in 1586, lies in the southeastern part near the port, historically encompassing a bathhouse, café, warehouses, and shops. The most prominent is the El-Jazzar Mosque, built in 1781 near the citadel and old saraya. Its green dome and tall, slender minaret are visible across the Old City. It is Israel's largest mosque outside Jerusalem and the largest built in Palestine during Ottoman rule. South of the citadel, the Az-Zaytuna Mosque features two green domes and a tall minaret, reportedly built on the site of a Crusader-era Church of St. Mary and Joseph. Adjacent to the citadel's west side is the Ash-Shadhiliyya Mosque, renovated in the early 21st century and home to a dervish brotherhood. Further west is the Al-Majadala Mosque, built in 1809. In the central Old City are the Al-Muallaq Mosque and, further east, the Ar-Raml Mosque.

Mosques of Acre
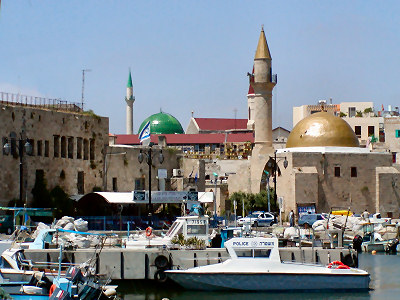
El-Bahr Mosque

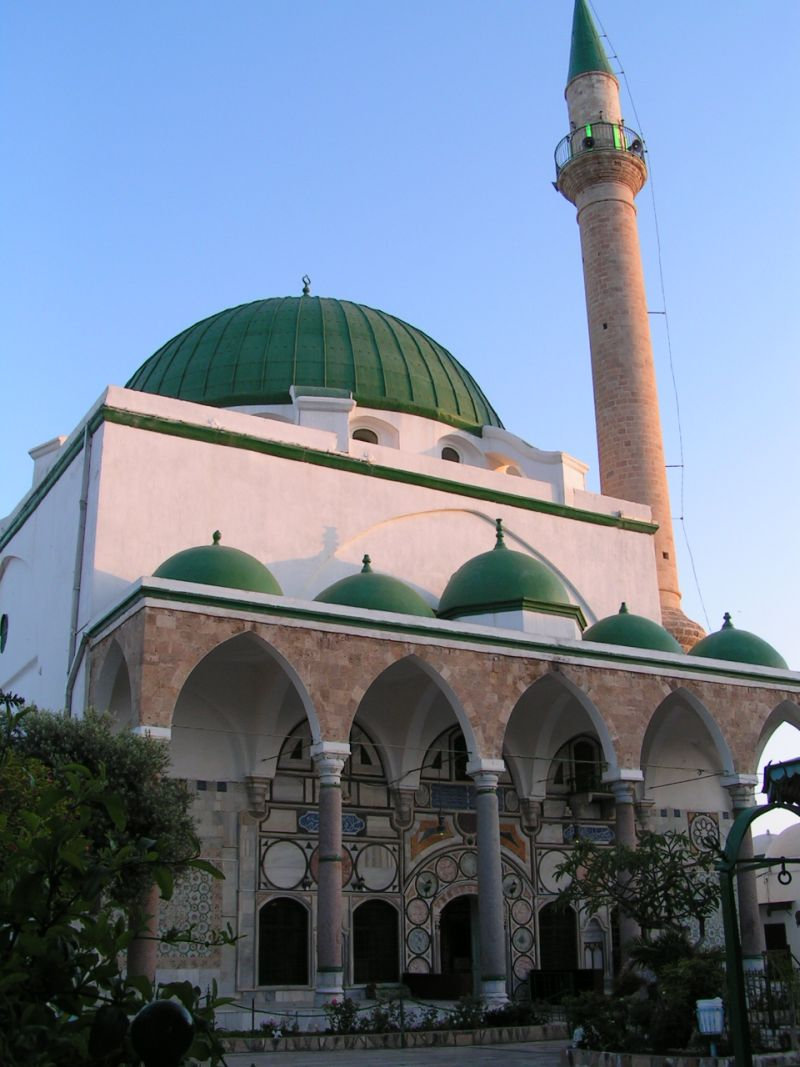
El-Jazzar Mosque

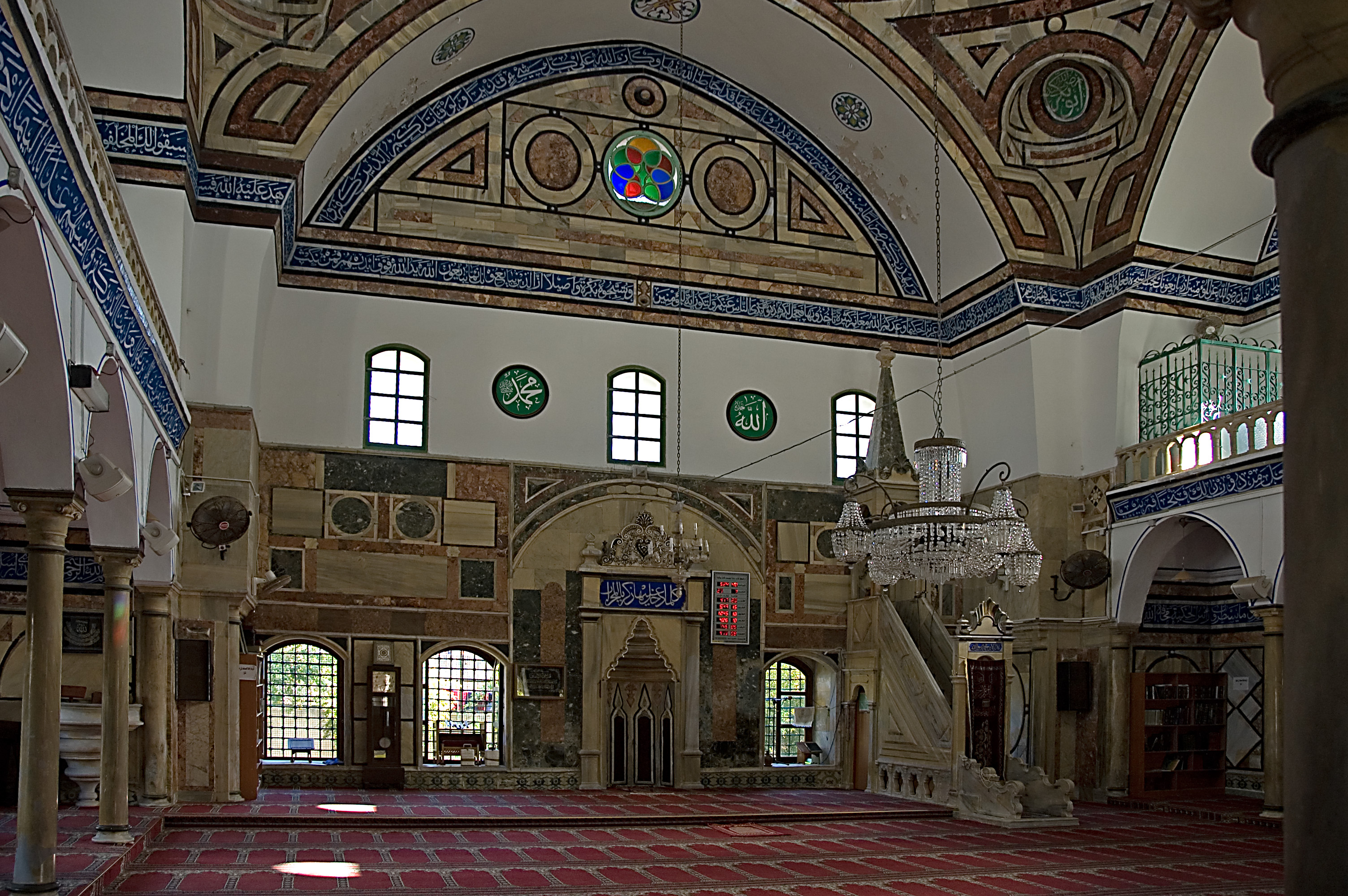
Interior of El-Jazzar Mosque

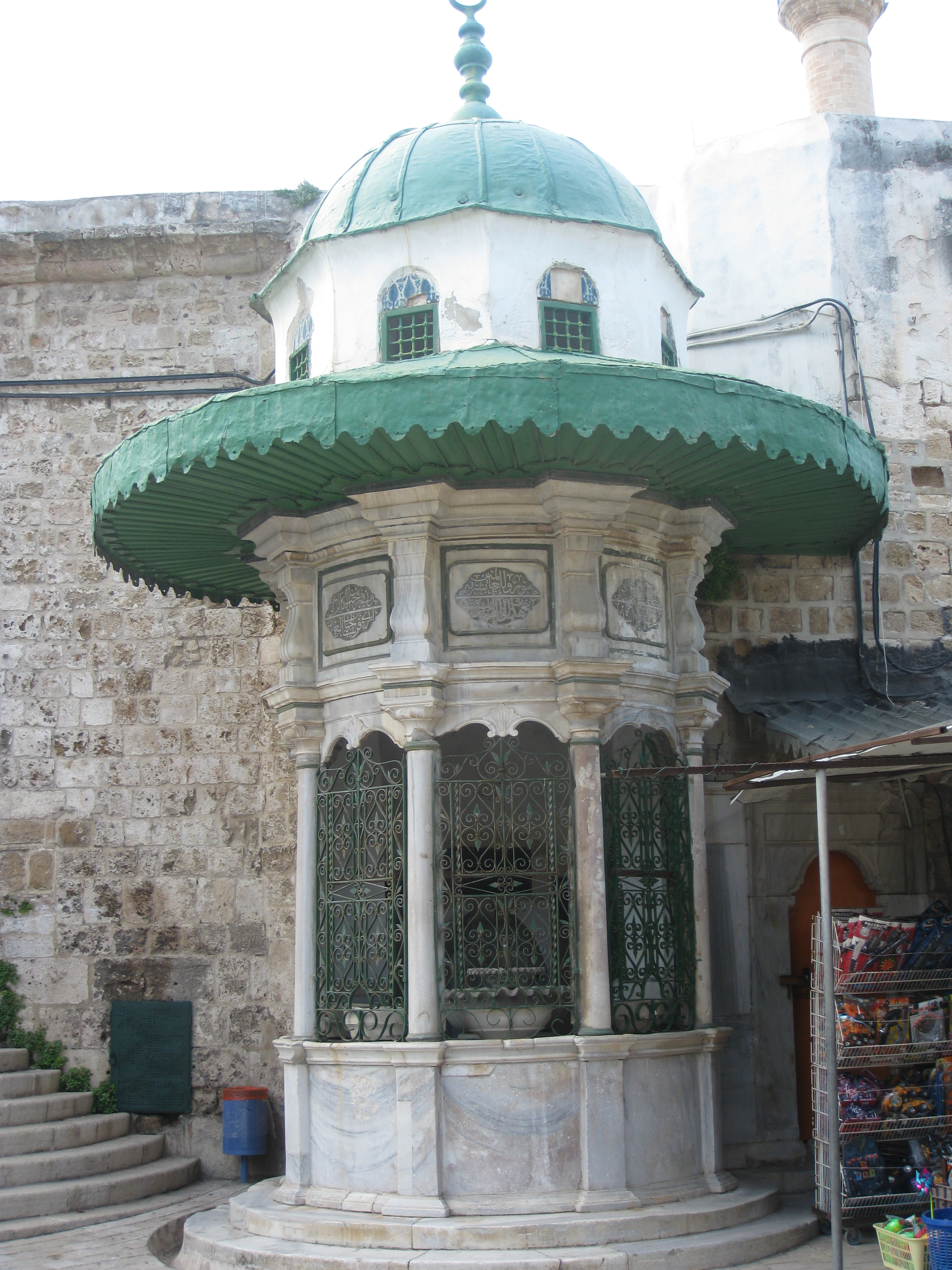
Ablution fountain at El-Jazzar Mosque

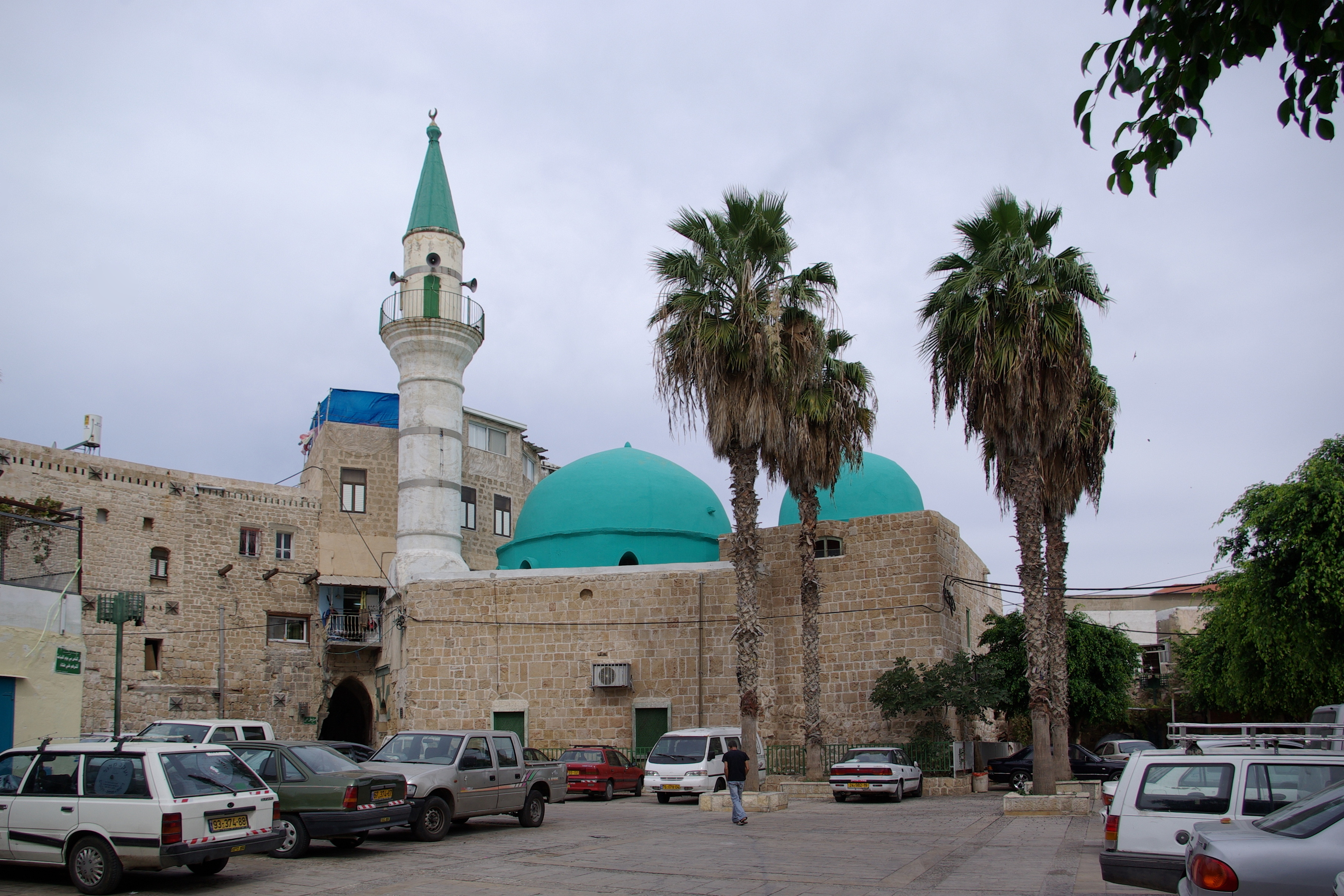
Az-Zaytuna Mosque

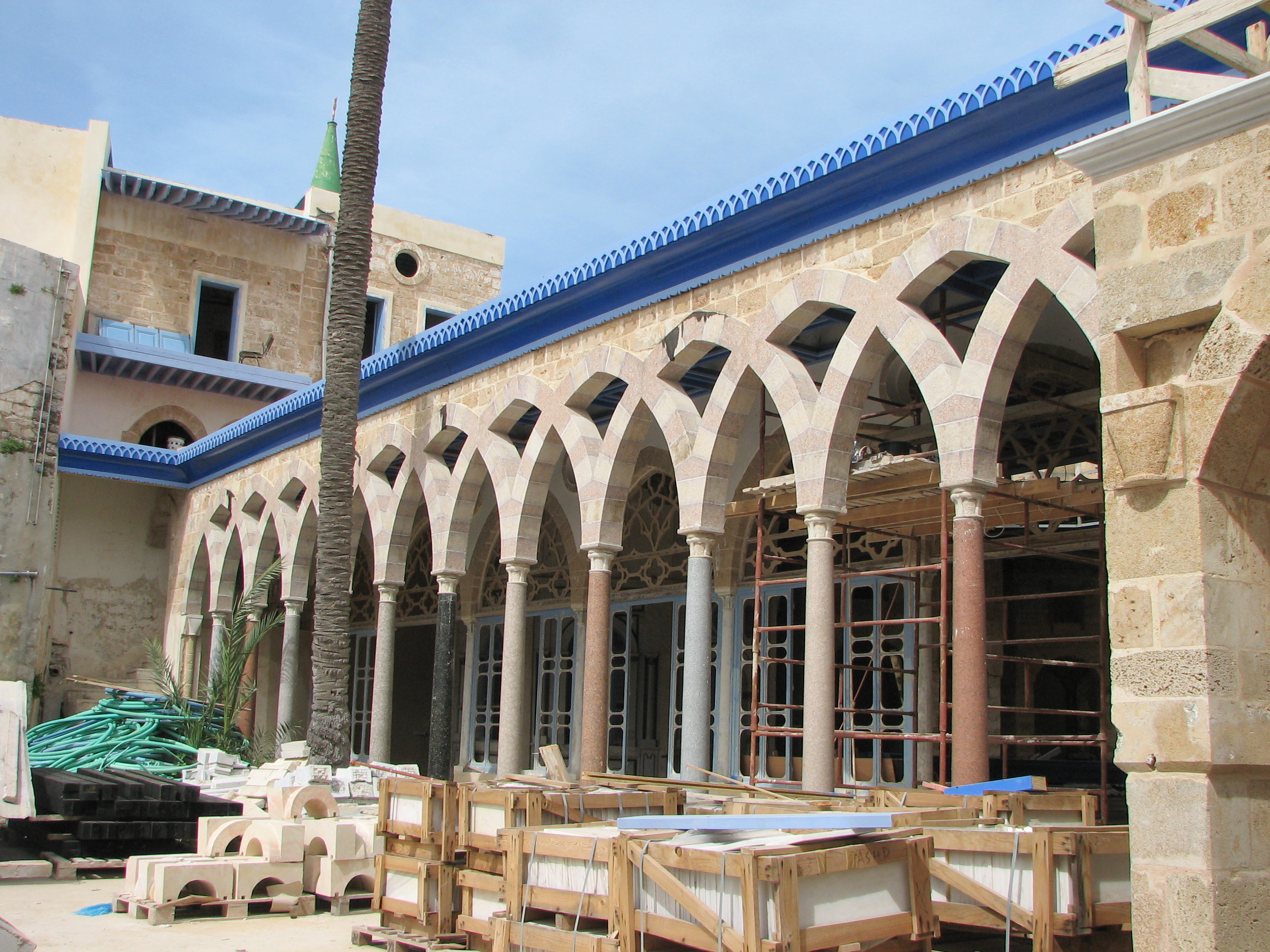
Ash-Shadhiliyya Mosque

=== Turkish bathhouse ===
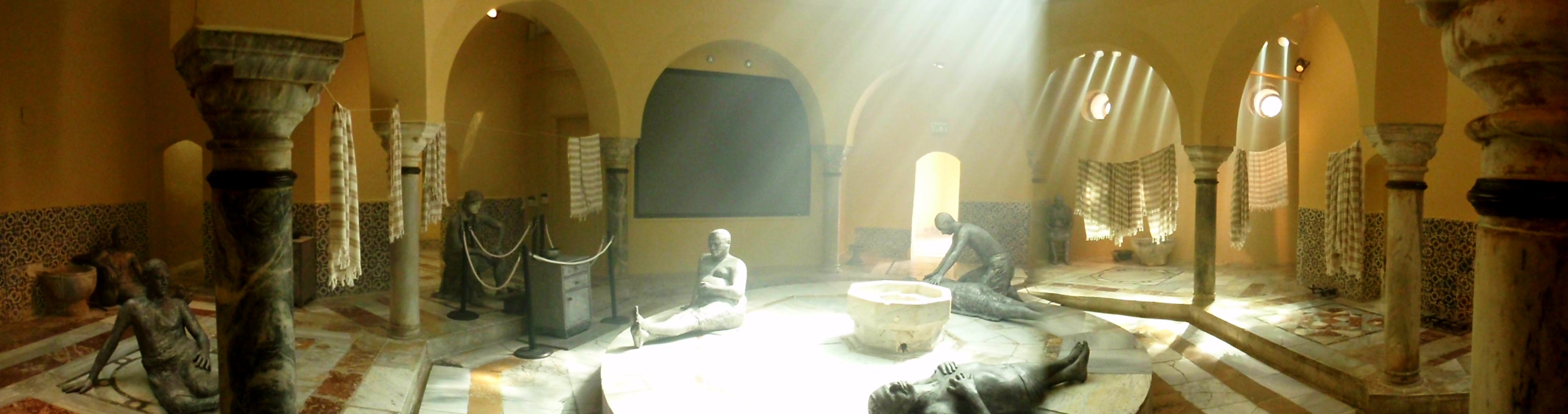
Interior of Hammam al-Basha Turkish bathhouse in Acre

South of the citadel, near the old saraya, lies the Hammam al-Basha Turkish bathhouse, built in 1795 by Jazzar Pasha and named after him. It operated until the 1940s and has housed a museum since 1954. Inside is a marble fountain, with a corridor leading to a series of rooms, culminating in a hexagonal steam bath. The building features marble floors, tiled walls, and colored glass in the domed roof, supported by four marble columns.

=== Caravanserais and bazaars ===
Several historic caravanserais, once hosting merchant caravans, are preserved in the Old City. The Khan al-Umdan, built in 1785 near the port, featured a courtyard for unloading goods, with warehouses and an inn on the ground floor and a hotel upstairs. Its courtyard is adorned with granite columns from Roman Caesarea. In 1906, an Ottoman clock tower was added, with views of the port. About 30 meters west, the Khan ash-Shuna is neglected but it has original Crusader structures on its ground floor. In the city center, the Khan al-Ifranj, the oldest fully preserved caravanserai, was built in the mid-16th century by French merchants, hence its name. Its northern and northeastern wings now house the Franciscan Terra Santa School. In the eastern Old City, the Khan ash-Shawarda was likely built on the site of a former Poor Clares convent. During British Mandate rule, its inner courtyard was converted into a street.

The most famous bazaar in Acre is the Suq Al-Abiad (White Market), built in the mid-18th century. For over 150 years, it was the city's primary marketplace, originally housing 110 shops but now reduced to 64 due to war damage. This covered market street, about 100 meters long, features cafés and shops on both sides. South of the El-Jazzar Mosque is the Turkish Bazaar, built in the late 18th century and used as a market until 1948. This 100-meter-long commercial street has a cross-vaulted ceiling with rectangular openings for sunlight, now housing art and souvenir shops. A commercial street also spans Marco Polo, Benjamin Metudela, and Fahir ad-Din streets.

Caravanserais and bazaars of Acre
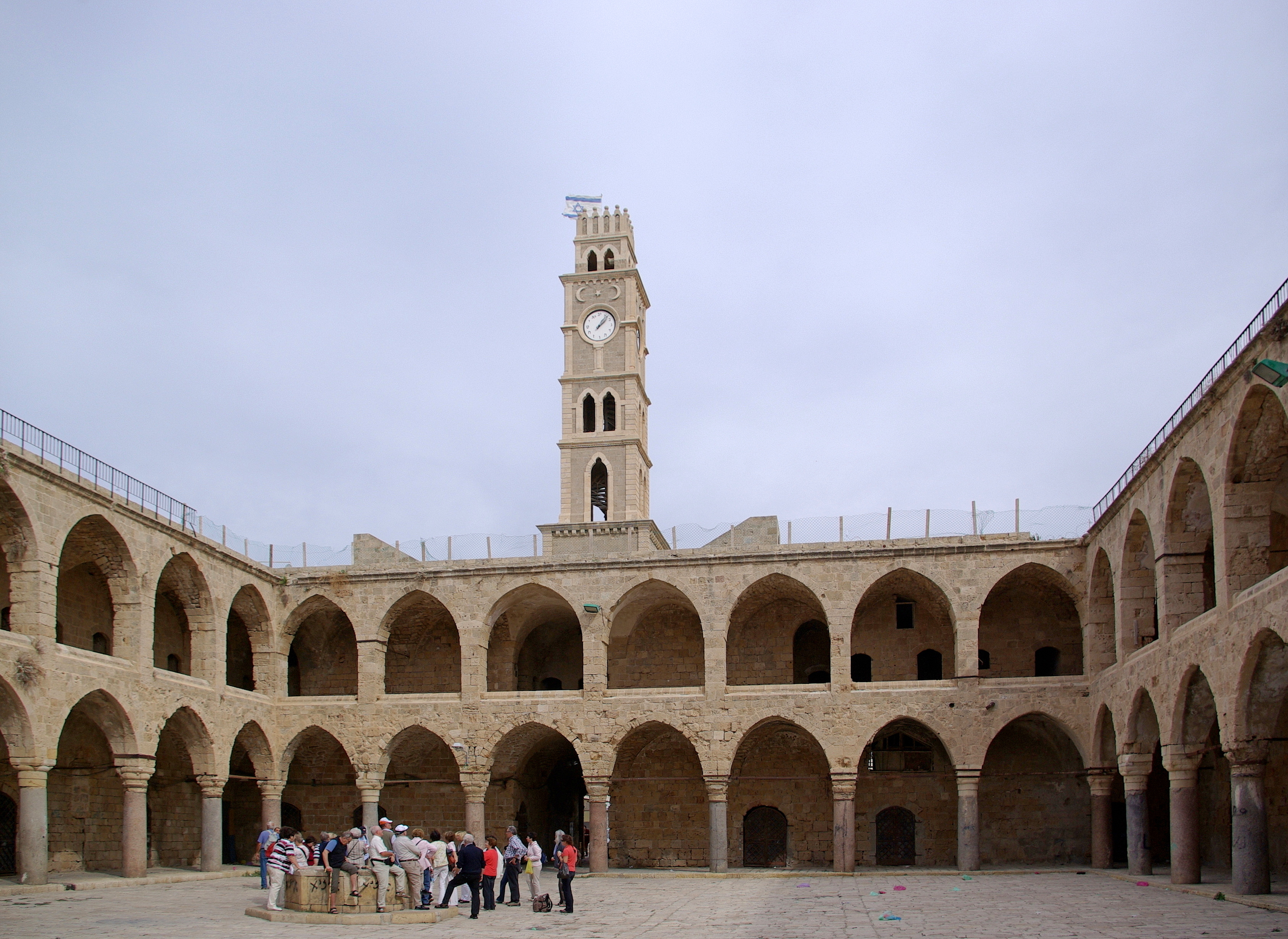
Khan al-Umdan

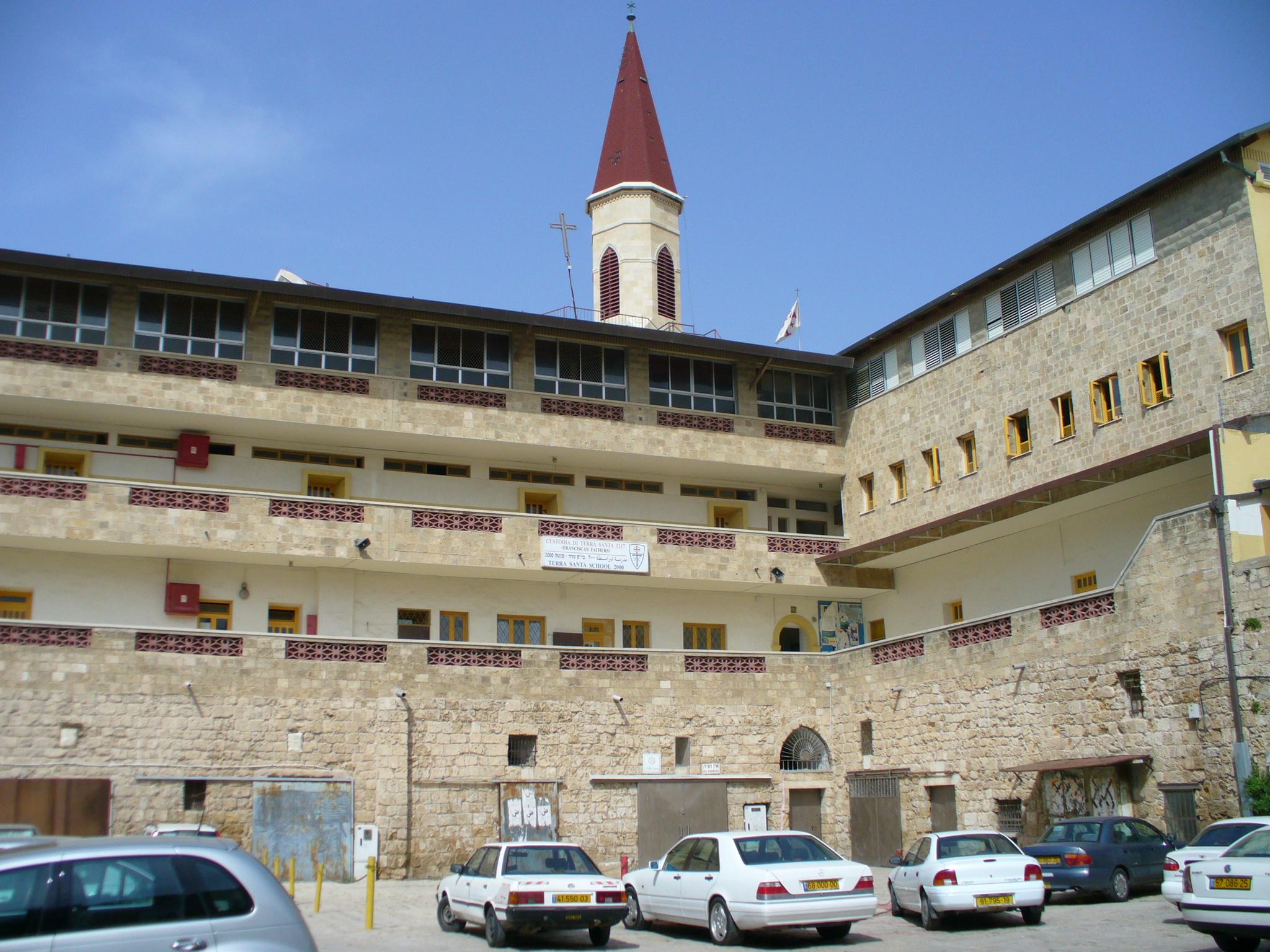
Terra Santa School in Khan al-Ifranj

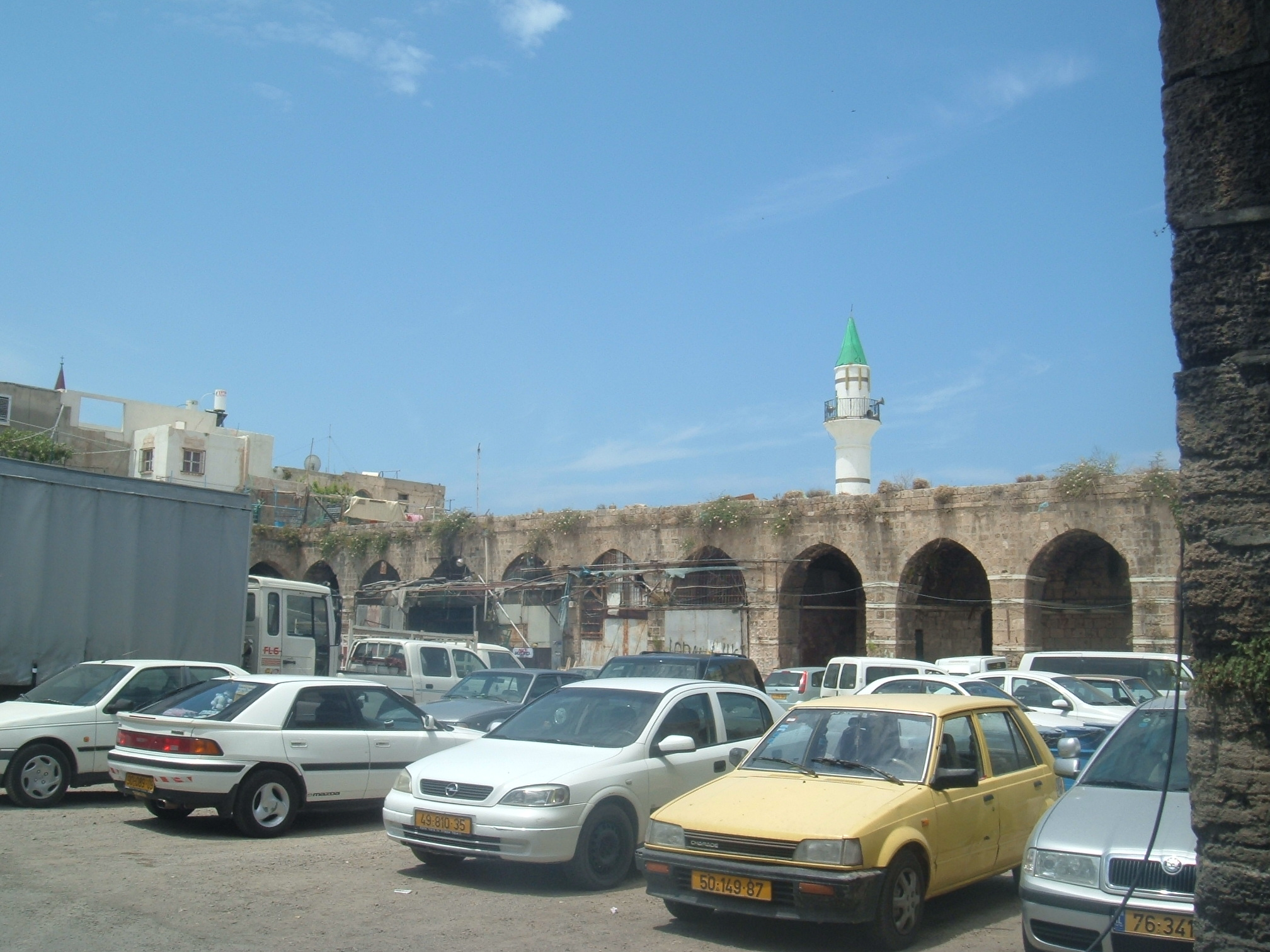
Inner courtyard of Khan ash-Shawarda

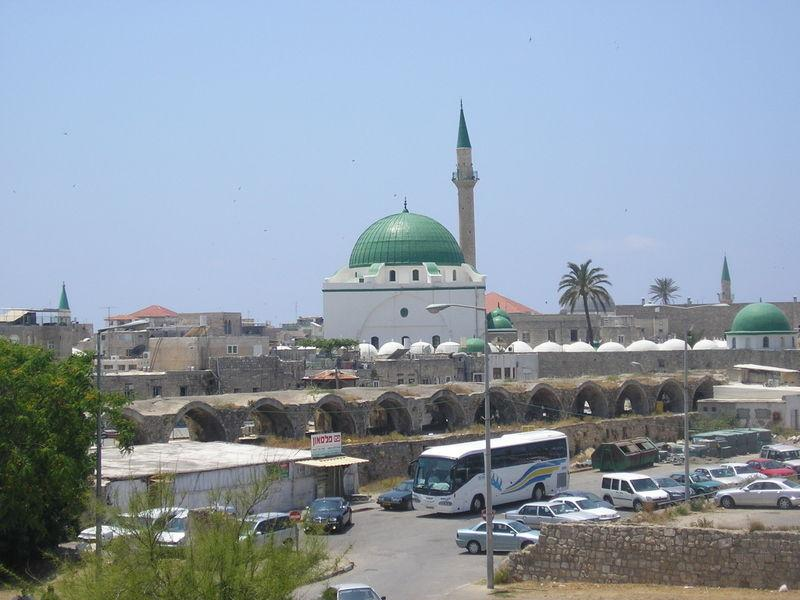
White domes before El-Jazzar Mosque mark the Suq Al-Abiad market

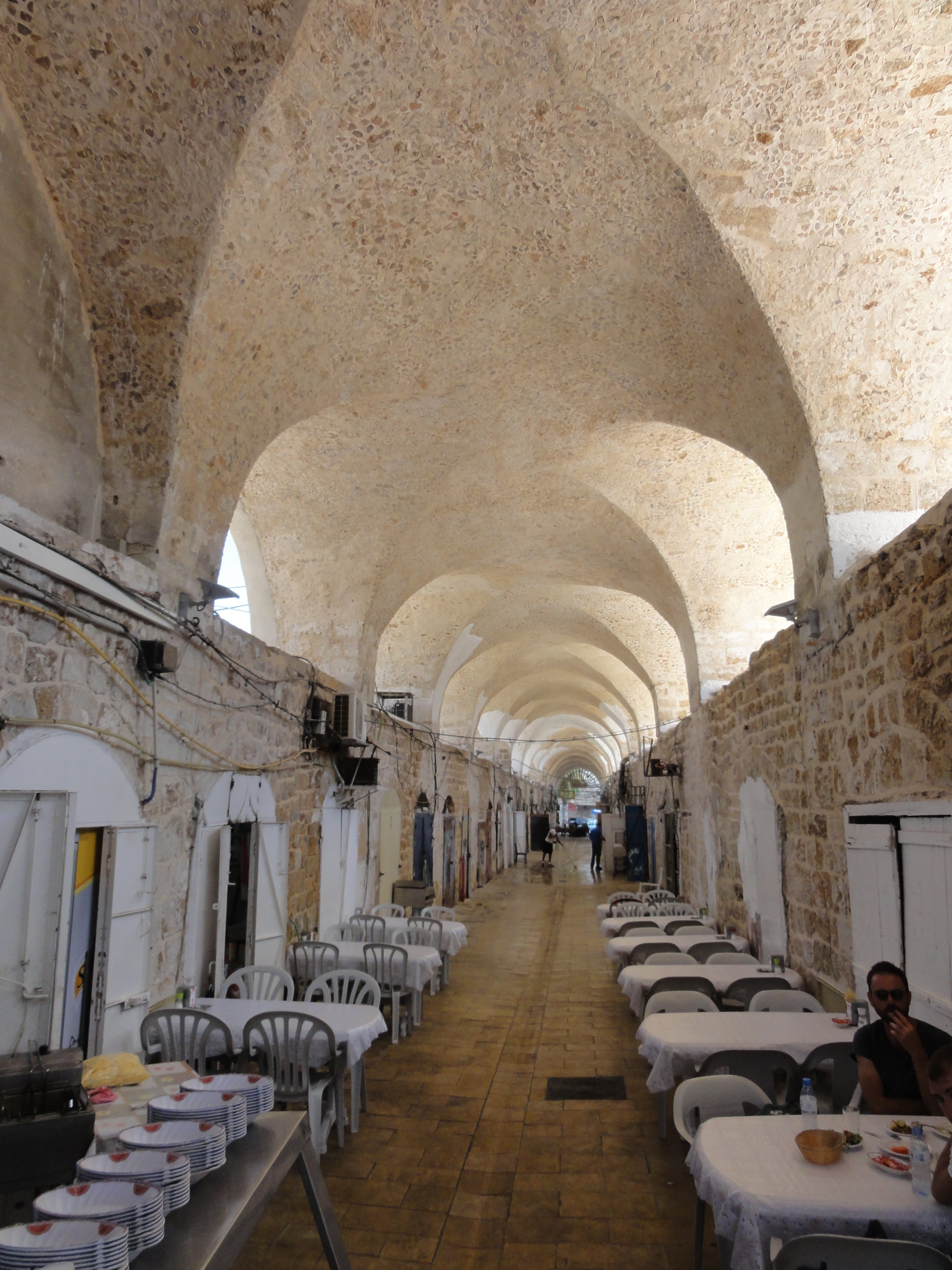
Interior of Suq Al-Abiad

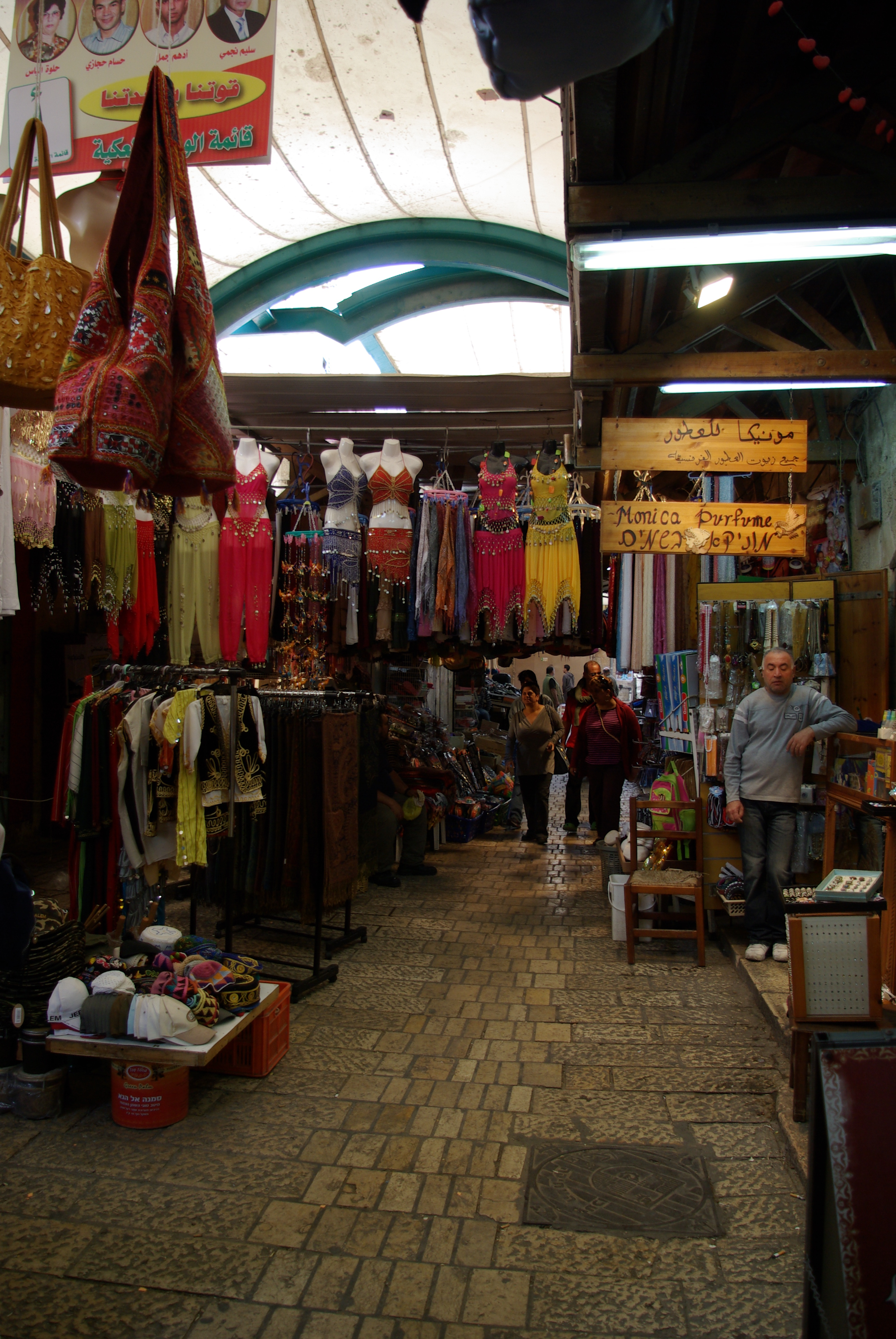
Interior of a street bazaar in Acre

=== Seaport ===
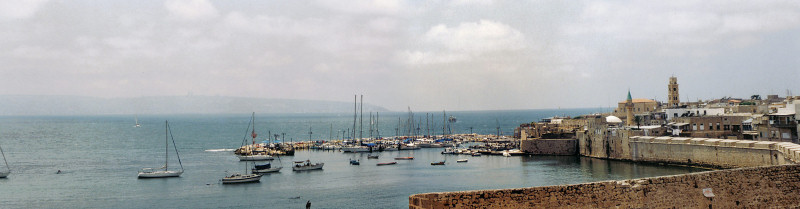
Panorama of the port in Acre

Acre was a vital maritime and fishing port. The first port in Acre was established in the 6th century BCE at the Na'aman river's mouth, south of the current Old City. In the 7th century, Arabs built a new port with a shipyard, serving as the main Muslim naval base against Byzantium. In the 8th century, the port and shipyard were relocated north to Tyre. Neglected until the late 9th century, the port was rebuilt by Egyptians with fortified defenses. It gained prominence under Crusader rule but was neglected again until the late 17th century. Today, it serves as a small fishing harbor and marina.
