= Radom =

City in Masovian Voivodeship, Poland

- City county
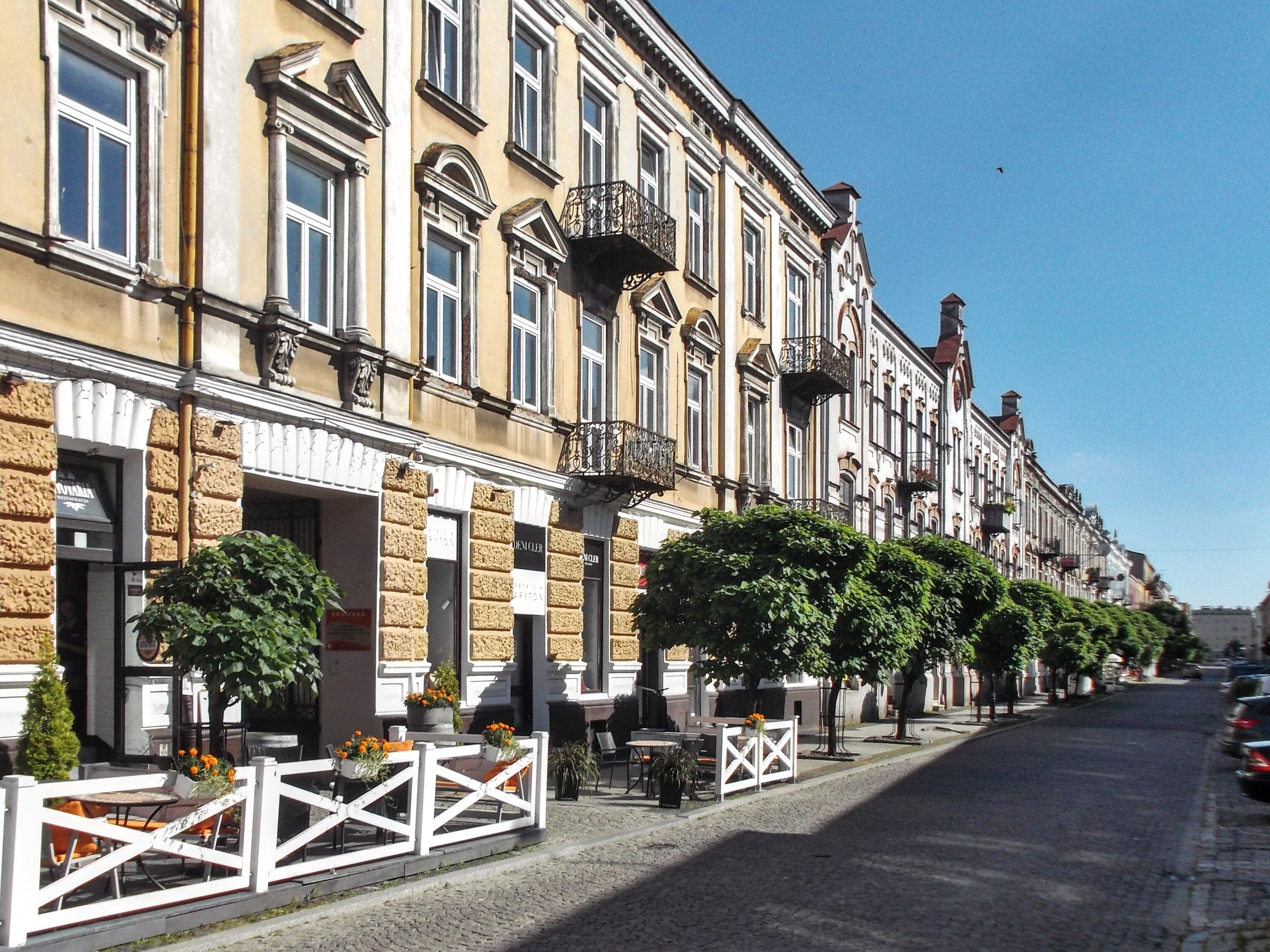
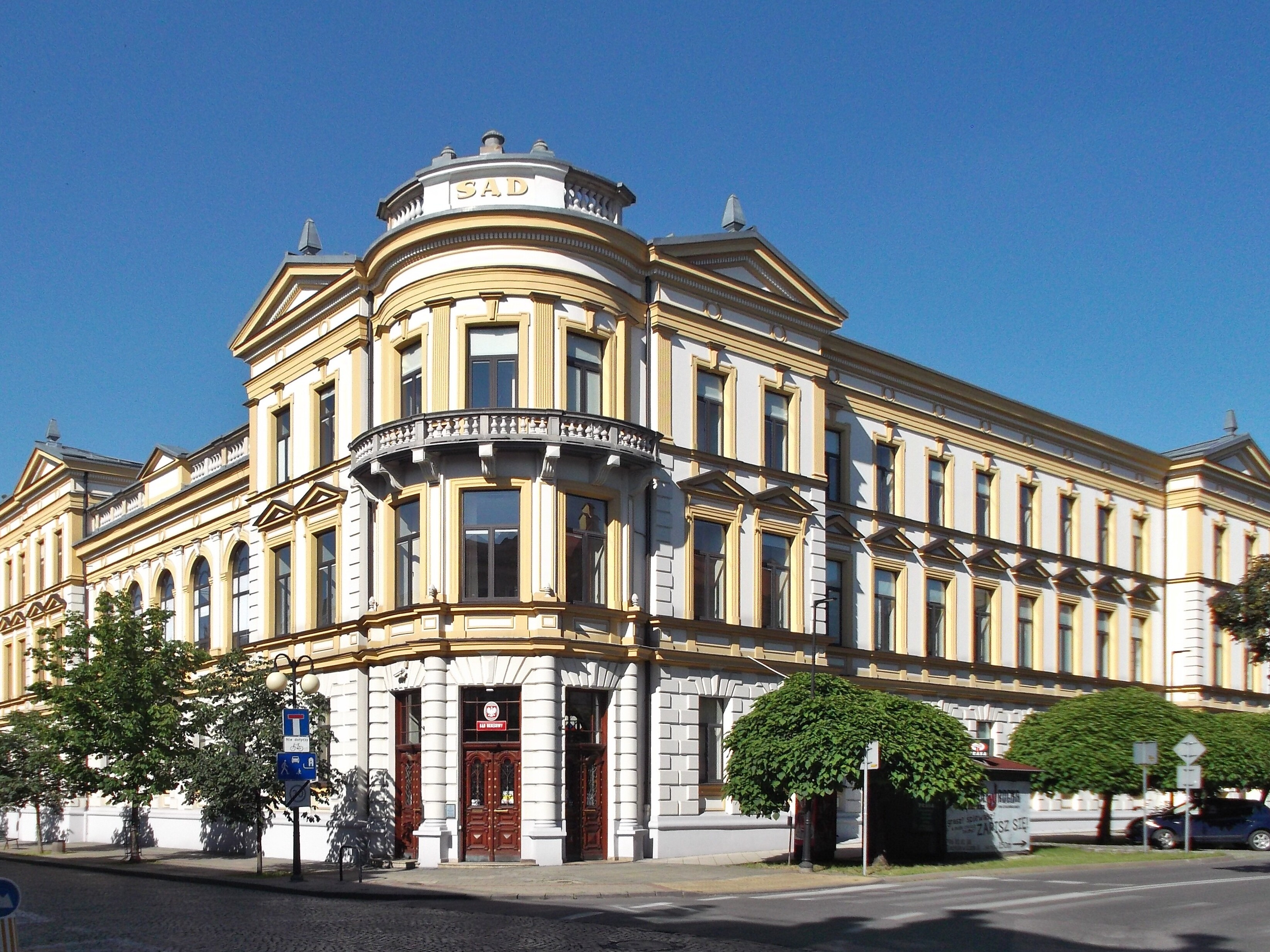
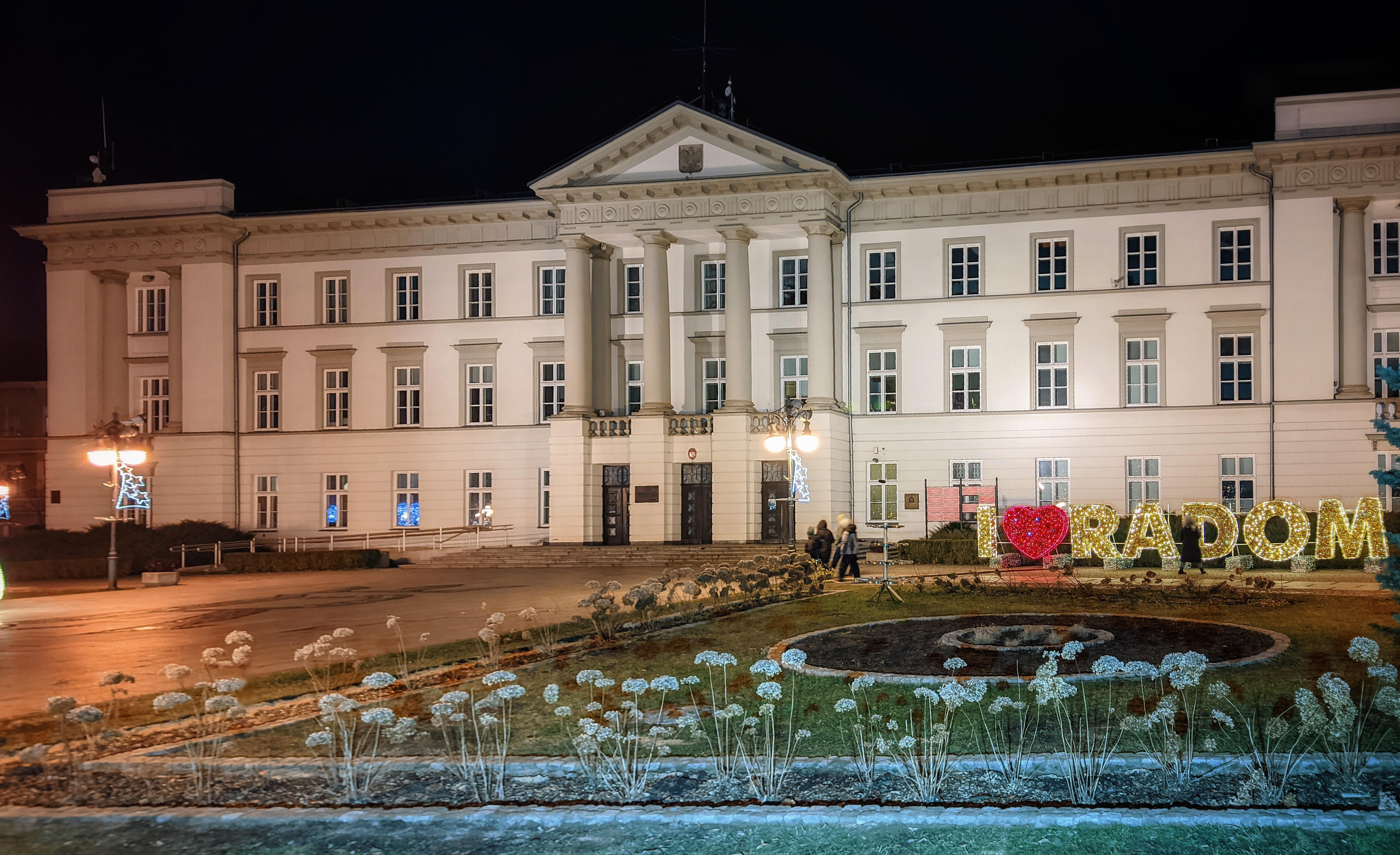
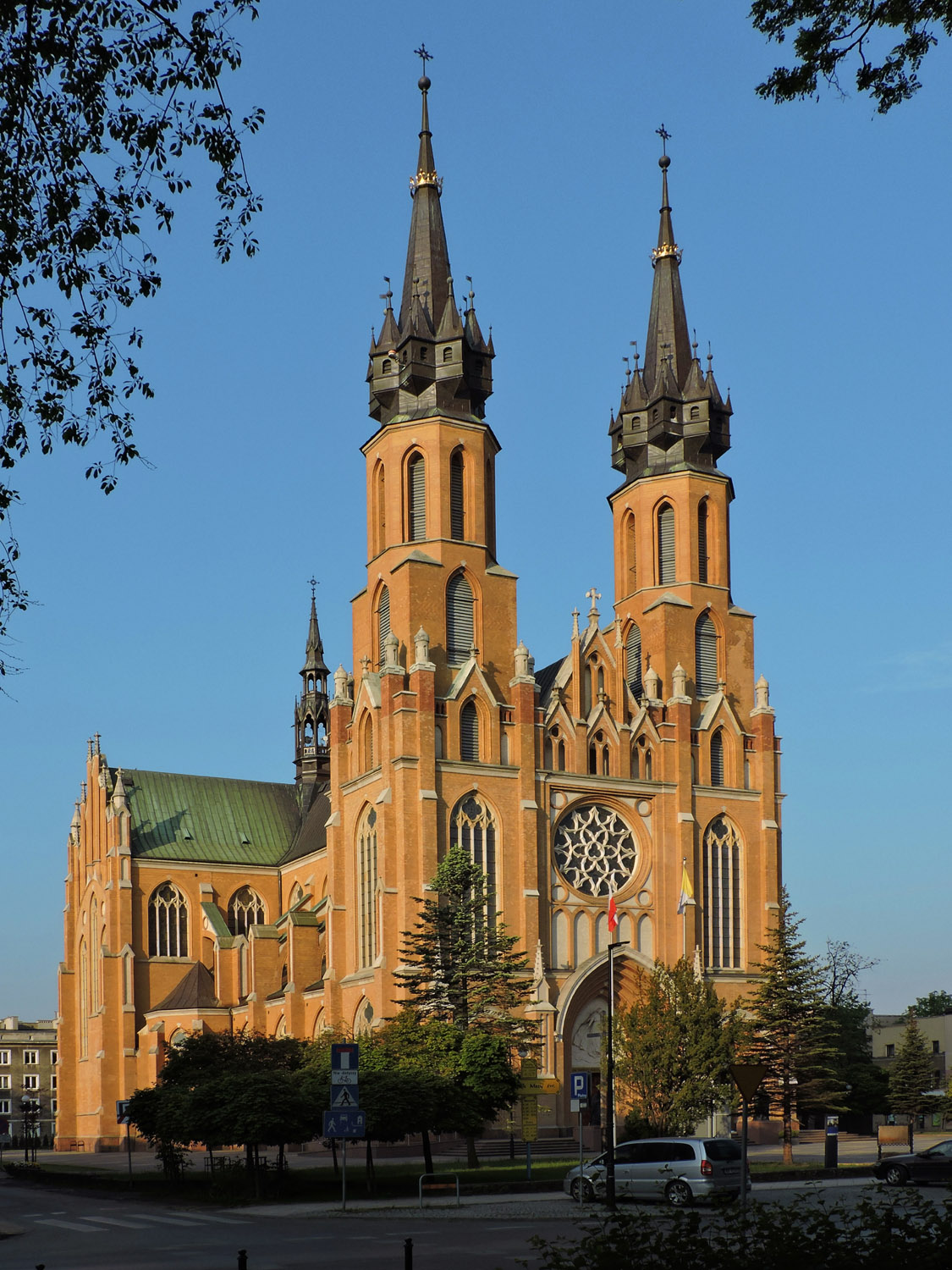
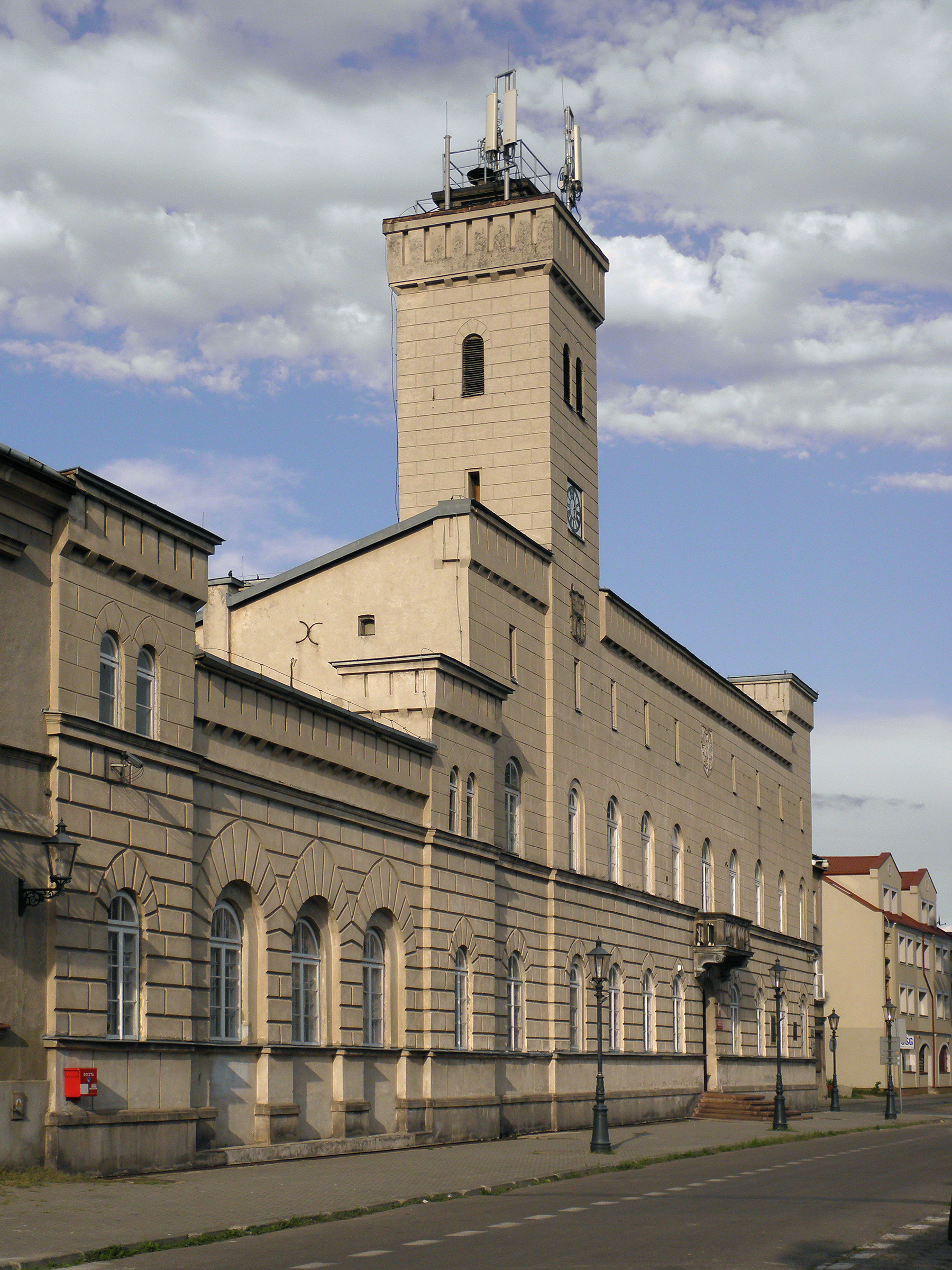
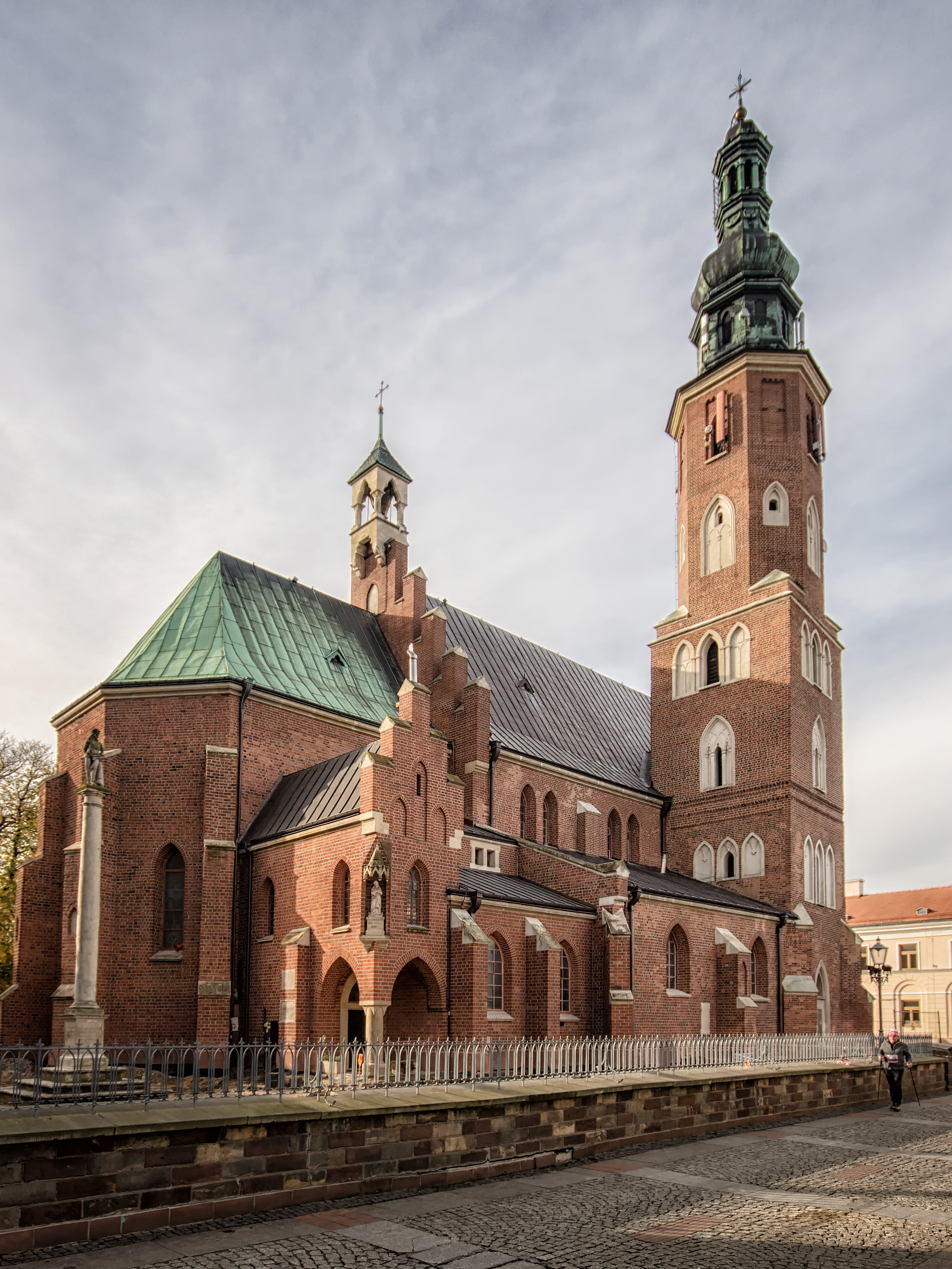
- Moniuszki Street Courthouse Sandomierz Palace Cathedral City Hall St. John's

- Flag Coat of arms

- Location within Poland
- Coordinates: 51°24′13″N 21°9′24″E
- Country: Poland
- Voivodeship: Masovian
- County: Radom County (powiat radomski)
- First mentioned: 1155
- City rights: 1364

Government
  - City mayor: Radosław Witkowski (PO)

Area
  - Total: 112 km^{2} (43 sq mi)

Population (30 June 2024)
  - Total: 206,946 ▼ (15th)
  - Density: 1,761/km^{2} (4,560/sq mi)
- Demonym: radomianin (male) radomianka (female) (pl)
- Time zone: UTC+1 (CET)
  - Summer (DST): UTC+2 (CEST)
- Postal code: 26-600 to 26-618
- Area code: +48 48
- Car plates: WR
- Primary airport: Radom Airport
- Website: http://www.radom.pl

Radom (Note: Pronunciation: UK: /ˈrɑːdɒm/ RAH-dom; Polish: [ˈradɔm]; Yiddish: ראָדעם, romanized: Rodem) is a city in east-central Poland, located approximately 100 kilometres (62 miles) south of the capital, Warsaw. It is situated on the Mleczna River in the Masovian Voivodeship. Radom is the sixteenth-largest city in Poland and the second-largest in its province with a population of 191,819 (31.12.2025).

Radom is a city with over a 1000 years of history. It was a royal city of Poland and a significant center of administration, having served as the seat of the Polish Crown Council which ratified the Pact of Vilnius and Radom between Lithuania and Poland in 1401, and the seat of the Crown Treasure Tribunal, the supreme audit institution of Poland in the early modern period. The Nihil novi and Łaski's Statute were adopted by the Sejm in Radom in 1505. The city contains a preserved medieval urban layout with heritage architecture in various styles, including Gothic, Baroque and Neoclassical, and several museums. It was a center of the June 1976 protests. Despite being part of the Masovian Voivodeship, the city historically belongs to Lesser Poland.

The city is home to the biennial Radom Air Show, the largest air show in the country, held during the last weekend of August. "Radom" is also the popular unofficial name for a semiautomatic FB Vis pistol, which was produced from 1935 to 1944 by Radom's Łucznik Arms Factory. The city continues to produce military firearms for the Polish Armed Forces.

The international Radom Jazz Festival and the International Gombrowicz Theater Festival are held in the city.

== History ==
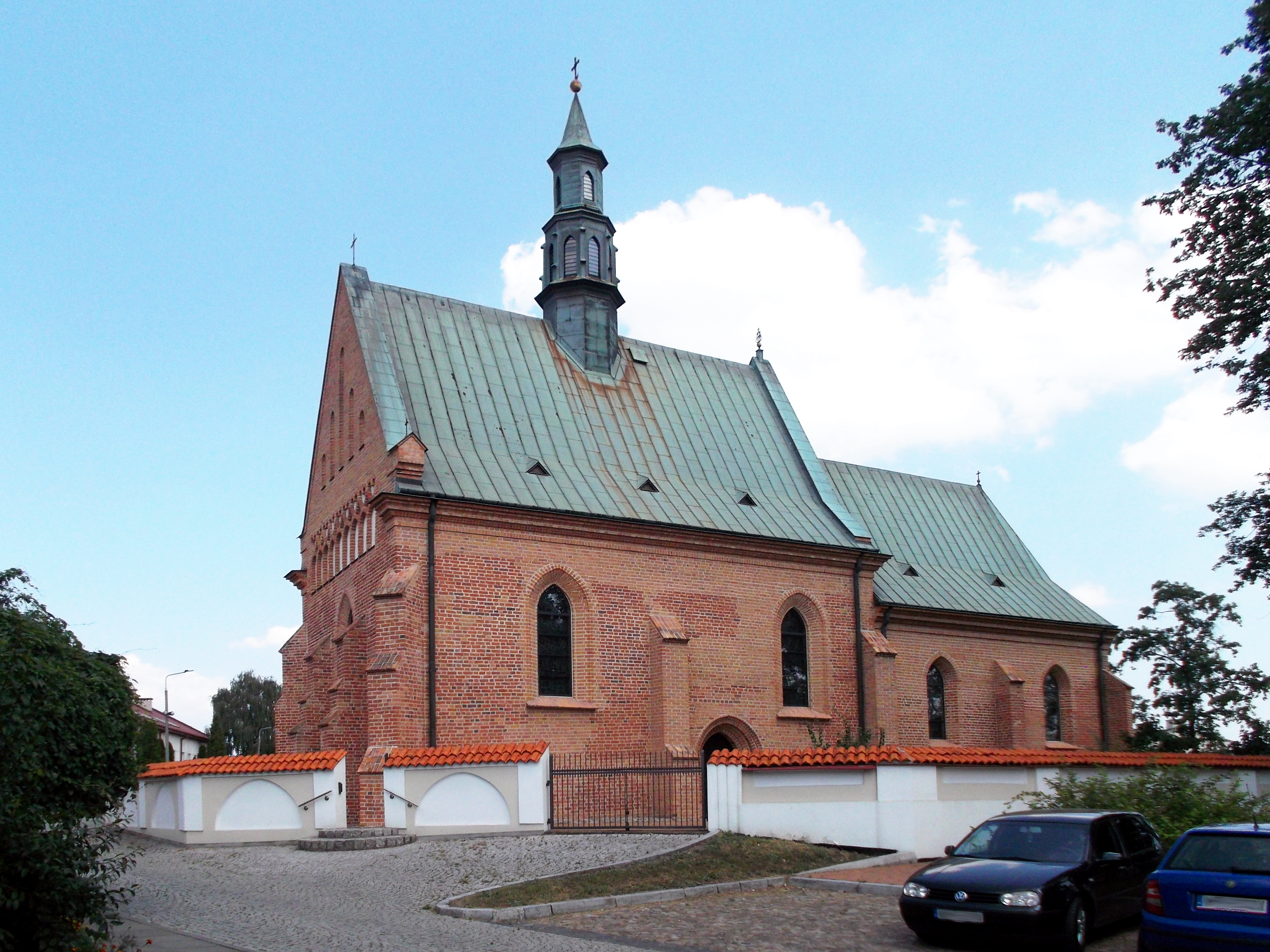
Saint Wenceslaus church, the city's oldest extant church

Radom's original settlement dates back to the 8th–9th century. It was an early medieval town in the valley of the Mleczna River (on the approximate site of present-day Old Town). In the second half of the 10th century, it became a gord, called Piotrówka, which was protected by a rampart and a moat. Due to convenient location on the edge of a large wilderness, and its proximity to the border of Lesser Poland and Mazovia, Radom quickly emerged as an important administrative center of the early Kingdom of Poland. Piotrówka was probably named after St. Peter church, which in 1222 was placed under the authority of a Benedictine Abbey in nearby Sieciechów. The church no longer exists; the oldest still-extant church in Radom is St. Wacław, founded in the 13th century by Duke of Sandomierz Leszek I the White. The first documented mention of Radom comes from the year 1155, in a bull of Pope Adrian IV (villam iuxta Rado, que vocatur Zlauno, or a village near Radom, called Sławno). By 1233, Radom was the seat of a castellan. The name of the city comes from the ancient Slavic given name Radomir, and Radom means a gord, which belongs to Radomir.

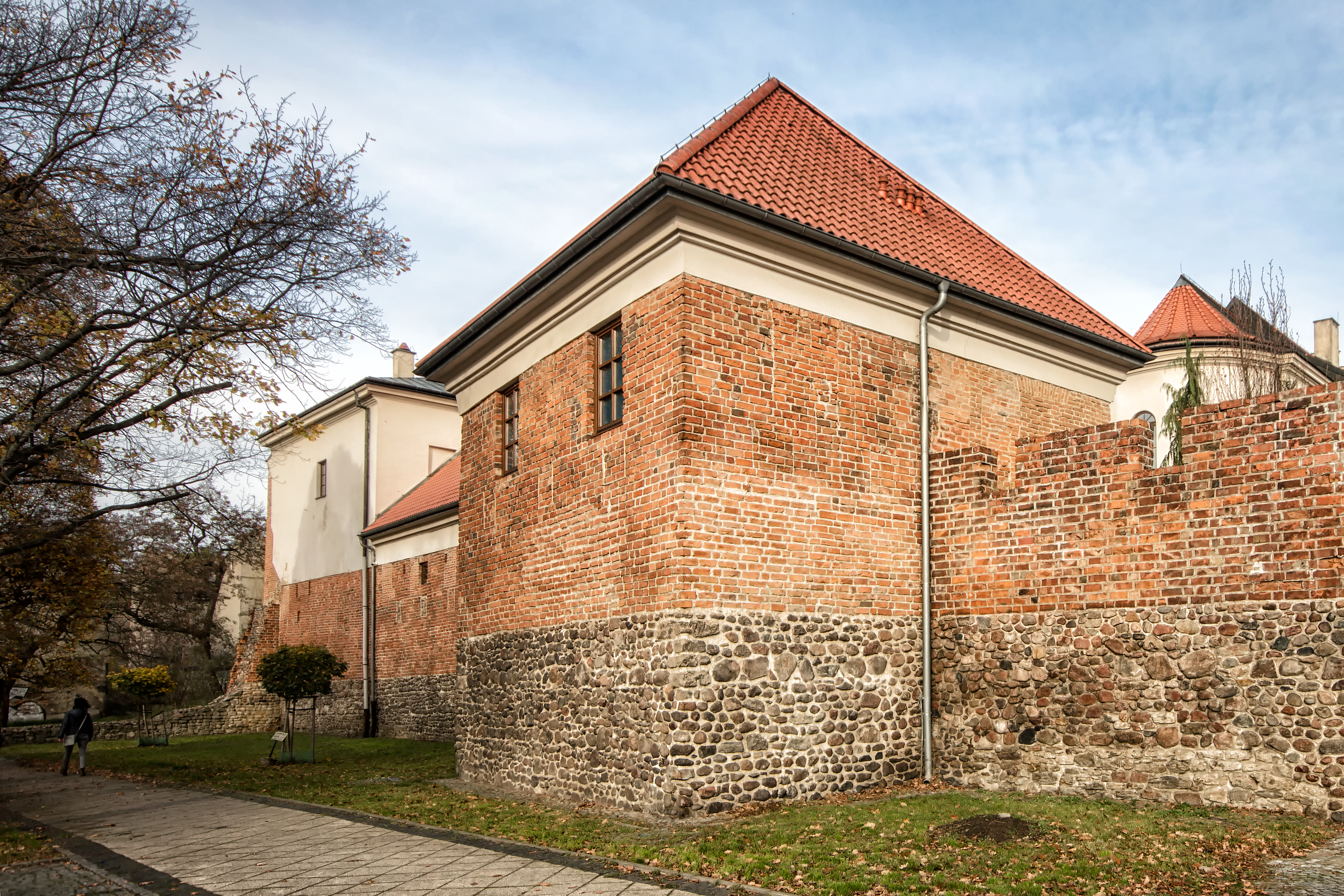
Medieval defensive walls

In the second half of the 13th century, Radom was granted a Środa Śląska town charter by Duke Bolesław V the Chaste, although no documents exist to confirm the exact date of this event. The town prospered in the 14th century, when in 1350 King Casimir III the Great established the so-called New Town, with a royal castle, a defensive wall, and a town hall. There was also a market square and a grid plan of the streets, patterned after Gothic German towns. The area of New Town was 9 hectares, and the length of the defensive wall was 1,100 meters. Radom had three gates, named after main merchant roads: Iłża Gate, Piotrków Gate, and Lublin Gate. The defensive wall was further protected by 25 fortified towers. New Town had the Church of John the Baptist, and the Royal Castle was built between the church and the moat.

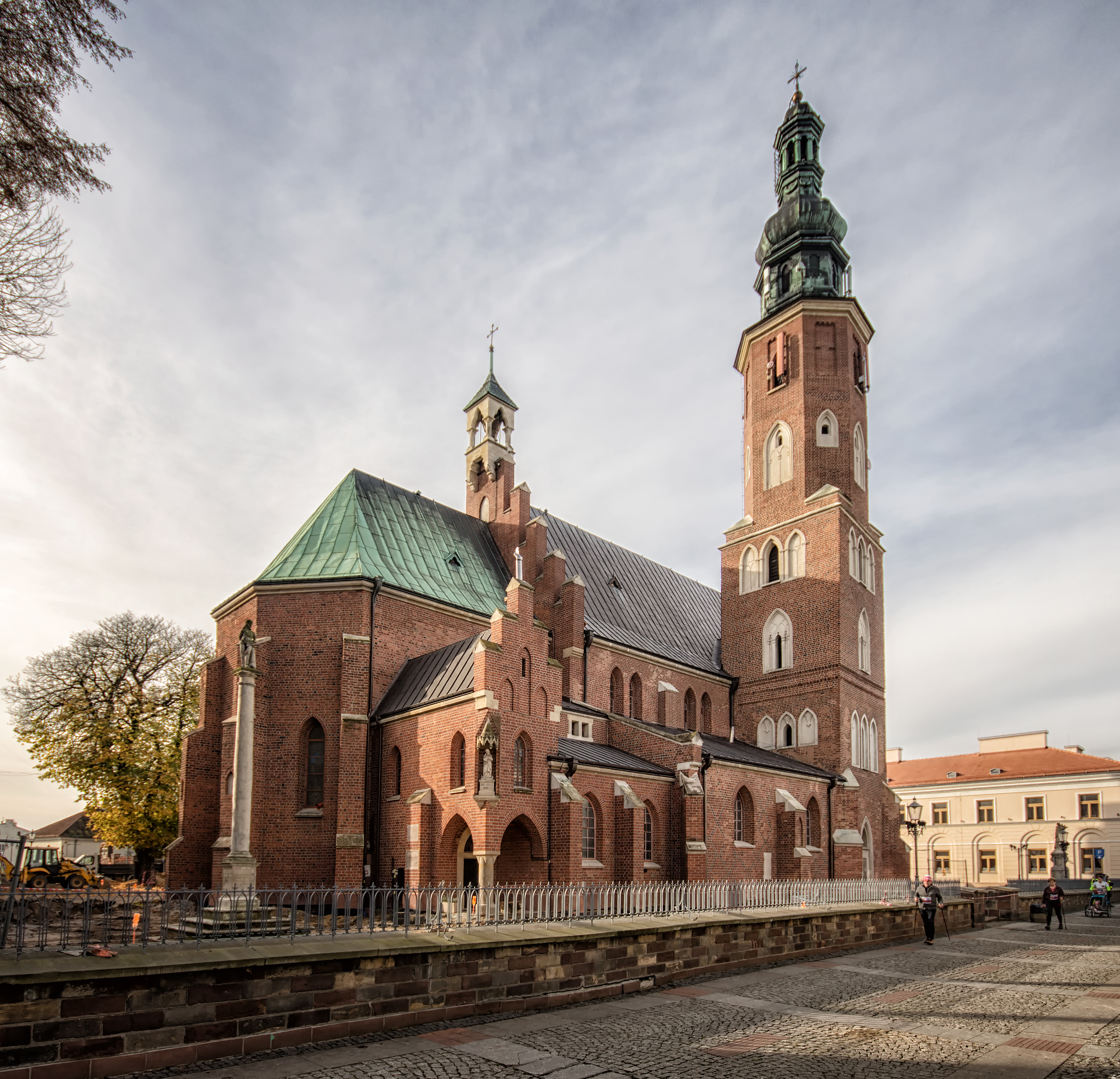
Saint John the Baptist church, founded by King Casimir III the Great in the 14th century

In 1364, Radom's obsolete Środa Śląska rights were replaced with more modern Magdeburg rights, and residents gained several privileges as a result. At that time, Radom was located along the so-called Oxen Trail, from Ruthenian lands to Silesia. In 1376, the city became the seat of a starosta, and entered the period of its greatest prosperity.

=== Poland's Golden Age ===
King Władysław Jagiełło granted several privileges to the city. Jagiełło himself frequently travelled from Kraków to Vilnius, and liked to stay at Radom Castle en route. On 18 March 1401, the Pact of Vilnius and Radom was signed, which strengthened the Polish–Lithuanian union. Immediately after the Pact, preparations for the Polish–Lithuanian–Teutonic War began. King Casimir IV Jagiellon frequently visited Radom, along with his wife, Elizabeth of Austria. Here, the King would host foreign envoys, from such countries as the Crimean Khanate, the Kingdom of Bohemia, and the Duchy of Bavaria. On 18 November 1489, Johann von Tiefen, the Grand Master of the Teutonic Knights, paid homage to King Jagiellon at Radom Castle. Mikołaj Radomski, one of the earliest Polish composers, comes from Radom. In 1468, the complex of a Bernardine church and monastery was founded here by King Jagiellon, with support of the local starosta, Dominik z Kazanowa. The complex was originally made of wood (until 1507).

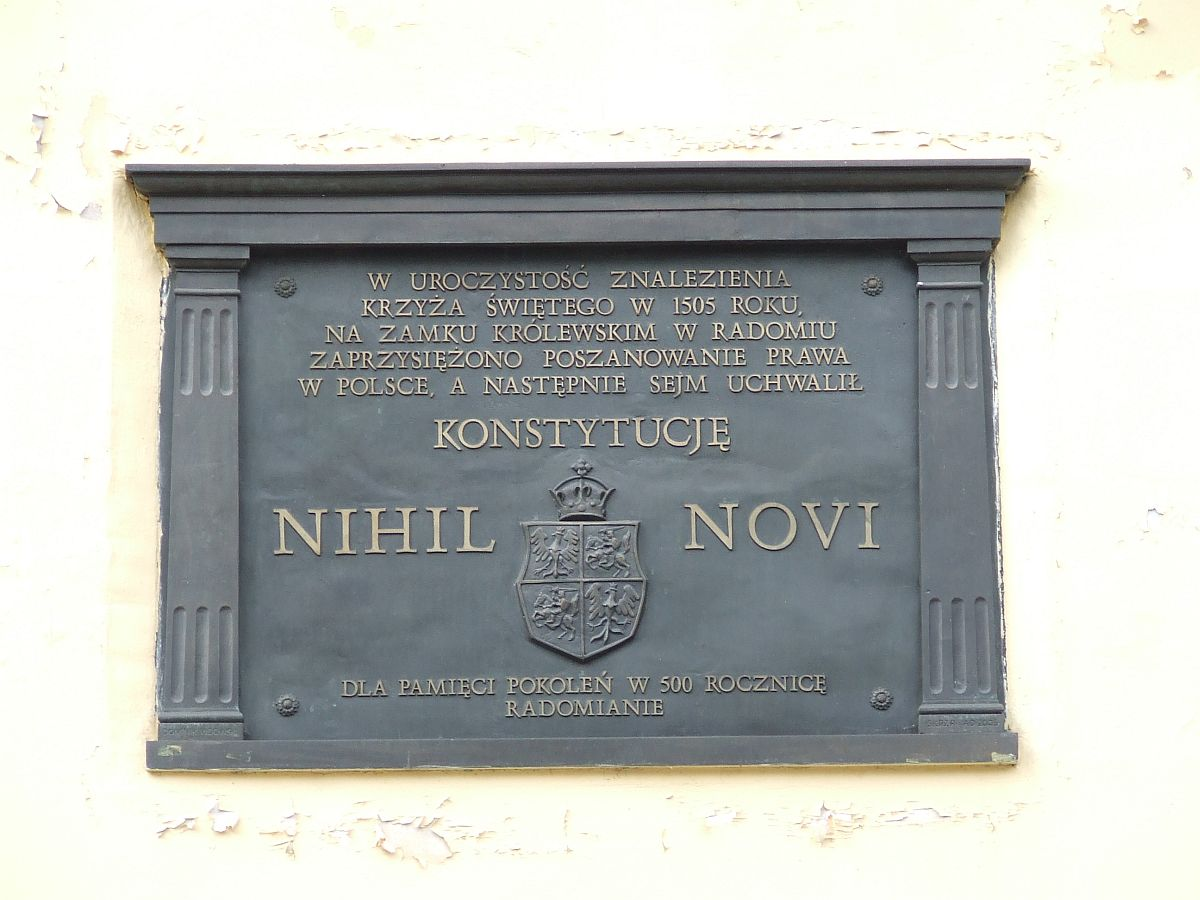
Plaque at the Radom Castle commemorating the adoption of the Nihil novi act in Radom in 1505

In 1481, Radom became the residence of Prince Casimir Jagiellon, the son of King Casimir IV Jagiellon. The young prince died of tuberculosis, and later became patron saint of both the city of Radom (since 1983), and the Roman Catholic Diocese of Radom (since 1992). During the reign of Alexander Jagiellon, the Nihil novi act was adopted by the Polish Sejm in a meeting at Radom Castle. Furthermore, at the same meeting, the first codification of law published in the Kingdom of Poland was accepted. Radom was a royal city, county seat and castellany, administratively located in the Sandomierz Voivodeship in the Lesser Poland Province. It remained one of the most important urban centers of the Sandomierz Voivodeship, and was also the seat of the Treasure Tribunal in 1613–1764, which controlled taxation. Several kings visited the city, including Stephen Bathory and his wife Anna Jagiellon, Sigismund III Vasa, and Augustus III of Poland. In 1623 many residents died in an epidemic, and in 1628, half of Radom burned in a fire.

The period of prosperity ended during the Swedish invasion of Poland. The Swedish army captured the city without a fight in November 1655. At first the invaders behaved correctly, as King Charles X Gustav still sought alliances within the Polish-Lithuanian nobility; the situation changed, however, in early 1656, when anti-Swedish uprisings broke out in southern Lesser Poland and quickly spread across the country. Radom was looted and almost completely destroyed in August 1656. Its population shrank from some 2,000 before the war, to 395 in 1660, with only 37 houses still standing. Swedish soldiers burned the royal castle and the monastery. With the Polish population in decline, the number of Jewish settlers grew by the early 18th century. In 1682 the first Piarists arrived, and in 1737–1756, opened a college. The 3rd Infantry Regiment of the Polish Crown Army was stationed in Radom at various times.

=== Late modern era ===
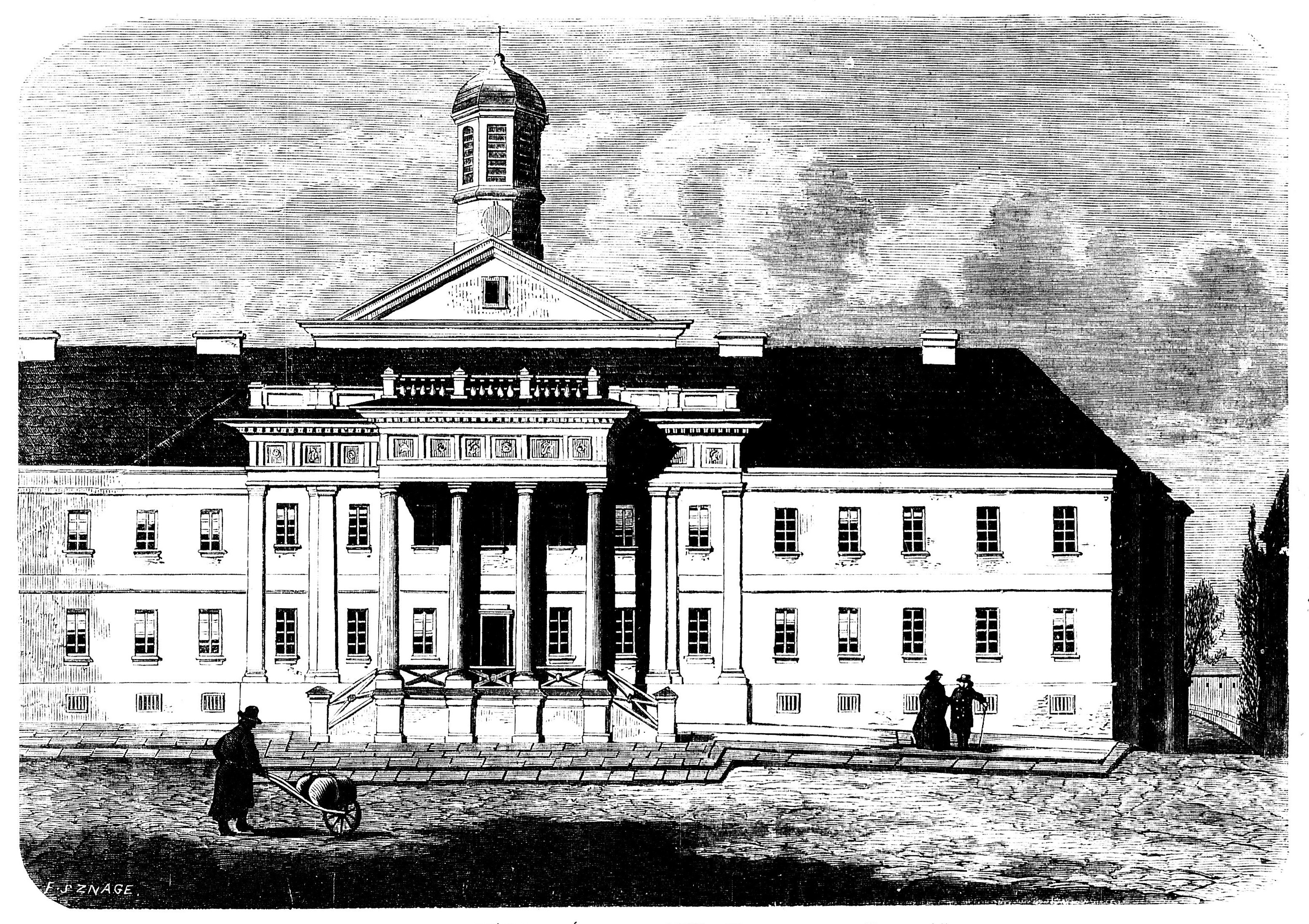
Piarist College in the 19th century

After the Third Partition of Poland (1795), Radom was part of the Austrian province of West Galicia. After the Polish victory in the Austro-Polish War of 1809, it was part of the Polish Duchy of Warsaw, which named it capital of the Radom Department. From 1815 the city belonged to Russian-controlled Congress Poland, remaining a regional administrative center. In 1816–1837 it was the capital of the Sandomierz Voivodeship, whose capital, despite the name, was at Radom. In 1837–1844 it was the capital of the Sandomierz Governorate, and from 1844 until the outbreak of World War I, the capital of the Radom Governorate. The Polish 5th Line Infantry Regiment, which later fought against Russia in the November Uprising, was stationed in Radom. The city was an important center of the November Uprising. Its obsolete and ruined fortifications were destroyed upon order of Mayor Józef Królikowski. In the early days of the January Uprising, Marian Langiewicz visited Radom, preparing the rebellion. In the 19th century, Radom was one of the leading centers of the new art of photography in partitioned Poland, alongside major cities of Warsaw, Gdańsk, Kraków and Wilno. In 1867 a sewage system was built. Russians closed down the Benedictine monastery and established a Tsarist prison in its place. Streets were gradually paved, and in 1885, a rail line from Dąbrowa Górnicza to Dęblin was completed, via Radom. In the early 20th century a power plant was built. In 1906, notable Polish independence fighter Kazimierz Sosnkowski, future politician and general, escaped from Warsaw to Radom, pursued by the Russian Okhrana. In Radom, he continued his secret activities, and became the commander of the local Combat Organization, before he eventually had to escape again, this time to the Dąbrowa Basin.

During World War I, the city was captured by the Austro-Hungarian Army in July 1915. An Austrian garrison remained until November 1918.

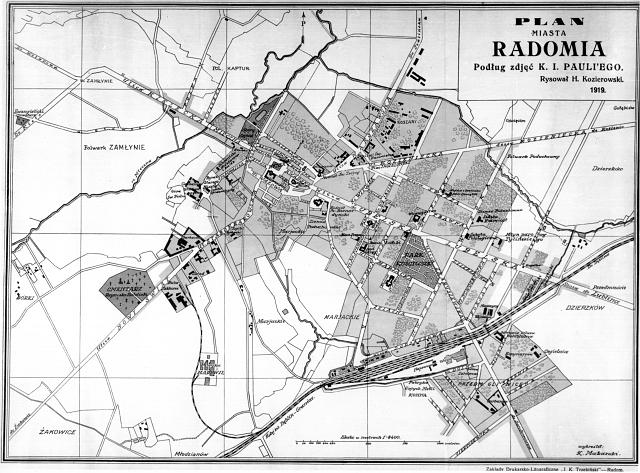
City map from 1919

In the Second Polish Republic Radom became part of Kielce Voivodeship. In 1932 the City County of Radom was created, and the following year, its rail connection with Warsaw was completed. In the late 1930s, due to the government project known as the Central Industrial Area, several new factories were built; by 1938, the population had grown to 80,000. The city was also a military garrison, serving as headquarters of the 72nd Infantry Regiment.

=== World War II ===
On 1 September 1939, the first day of the German invasion of Poland and World War II, the Germans air raided the city. On 8 September 1939, Radom was captured by the Wehrmacht, and was afterwards occupied by Germany. On 21 September 1939, the German Einsatzgruppe II entered the city to commit various crimes against the population, and afterwards its members co-formed the local German police and security forces. The Germans immediately confiscated the food stored in warehouses in Radom and nearby settlements, and carried out requisitions in the city council. The occupiers established a special court in Radom, and two temporary prisoner-of-war camps for captured Polish soldiers, one in the pre-war military barracks and one in the Tadeusz Kościuszko Park. There were poor conditions in the camp in the barracks, and hunger and diseases were common. The local civilian population helped many POWs escape from the camp.

From 1939 to 1945, Radom was the seat of the Radom District in the General Government.

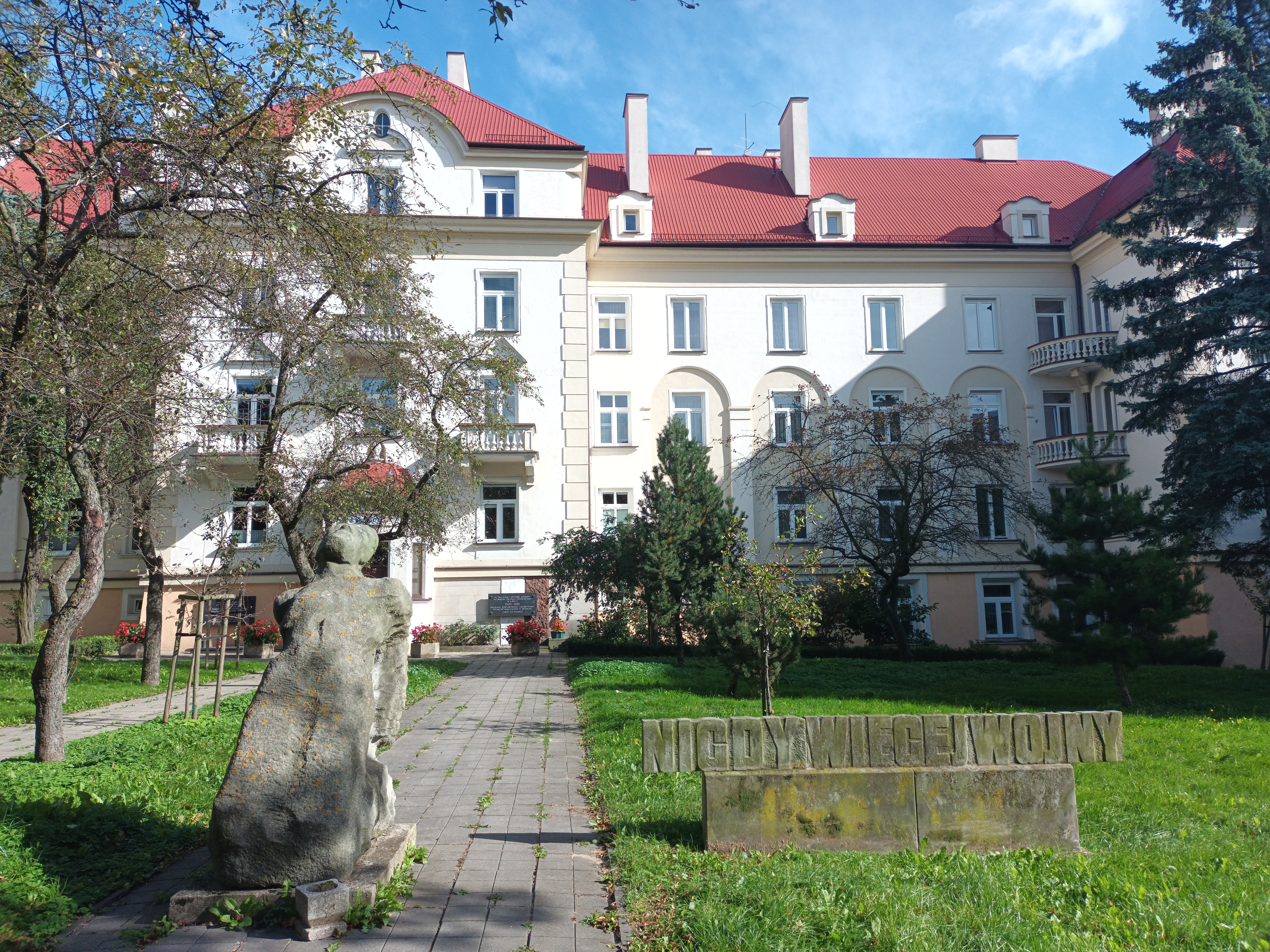
Former seat of the Gestapo and NKVD during the occupation

From October 1939 to January 1940, the Germans carried out several public executions of Polish civilians in various locations in Radom, killing 111 people. The Germans also operated a heavy prison in the city, and carried mass arrests of hundreds of Poles, who were then held in the prison. Many Poles expelled from Gdynia in 1939 were placed in a temporary transit camp in a local church, before they were sent to nearby settlements.

The occupiers liquidated local cultural and social life. All sports clubs and high schools were closed, and teaching of literature, geography and history in the remaining schools was prohibited.

In March and May 1940, the Germans carried out massacres of 210 Poles, including teenagers, from Radom and nearby settlements in the city's Firlej district. Around 100 Poles from Radom were murdered by the Russians in the large Katyn massacre in April–May 1940. In July, August and November 1940, the Germans carried out deportations of Poles from the local prison to the Auschwitz concentration camp. Deportations to concentration camps continued throughout the war, and 18,000 people passed through the local prison, mostly Polish political activists, resistance members and innocent people, plus ordinary criminals. At the large massacre sites in the present-day districts of Firlej and Kosów, the Germans murdered around 15,000 and 1,500 people, respectively.

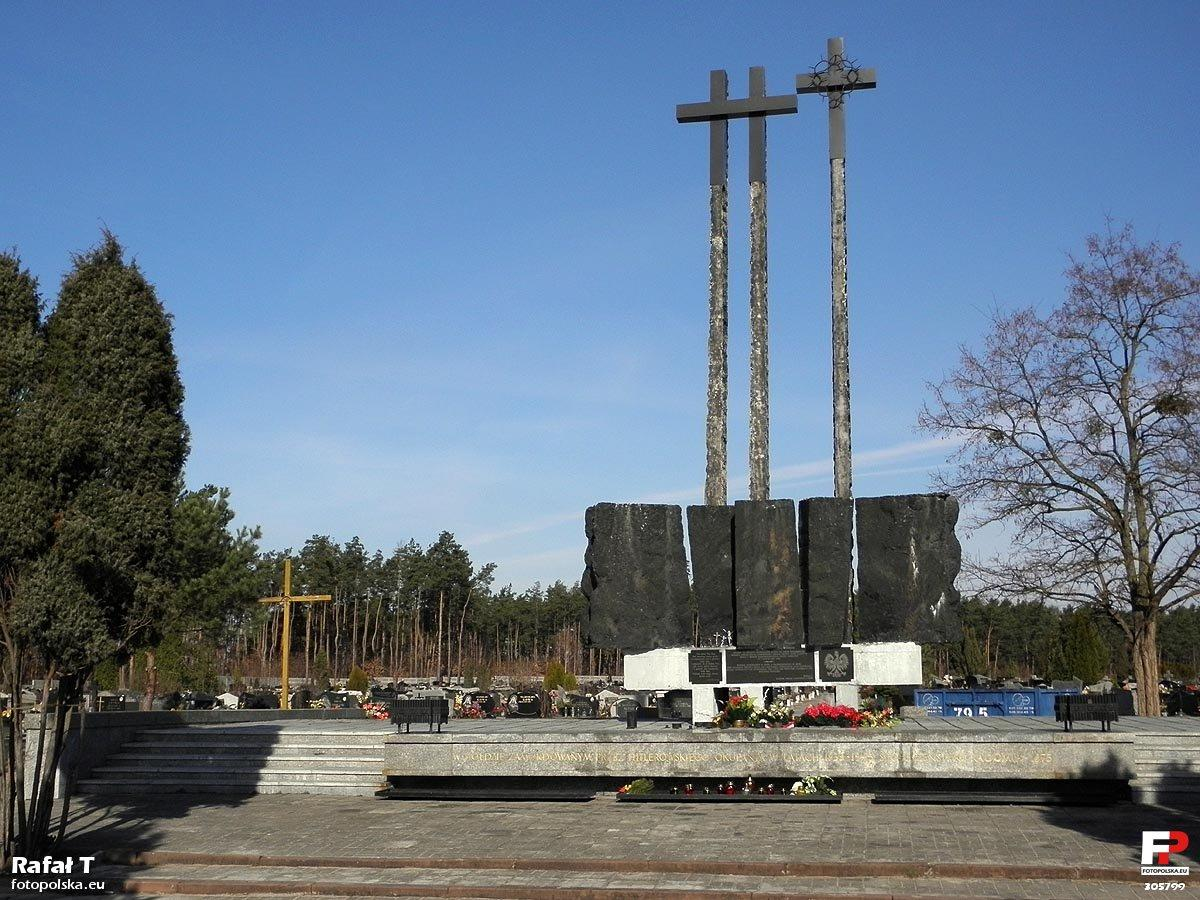
Monument and cemetery in Firlej where the Germans murdered around 15,000 Poles and Jews

In October 1940, the German occupiers established a forced labour camp for Jews, and in 1941, they formed the Radom Ghetto, with a population of 34,000 Jews, most of whom perished at the Treblinka extermination camp. According to German regulations, sheltering Jews outside the ghetto was punishable by death. The secret Polish Council to Aid Jews "Żegota", established by the Polish resistance movement operated in the city.

Radom was a center of Polish resistance, with various organizations, such as Service for Poland's Victory, Independent Poland, Union of Armed Struggle, Bataliony Chłopskie, Grey Ranks and numerous Home Army units operating in the area. The resistance carried out various actions, which included sabotage, stealing weapons, secret education, etc. Poles were even able to produce weapons for Polish partisans in the local arms factory, even though it was seized by the Germans. In 1942, the Germans discovered the activity, and then publicly hanged 50 Poles, including 26 employees of the arms factory, and a pregnant woman. Scouts from the Gray Ranks who worked at the local post office stole and destroyed anonymous letters to the Gestapo, thus possibly saving many lives. Two German doctors from a local hospital helped the Polish resistance, for which one was even arrested and sent to a concentration camp. In April 1943, the resistance successfully assassinated the chief of the local German police.

In 1944, following the Polish Warsaw Uprising, the Germans deported thousands of Varsovians from the Dulag 121 camp in Pruszków, where they were initially imprisoned, to Radom. Those Poles were mainly old people, ill people and women with children. 3,500 Poles expelled from Warsaw stayed in the city, as of 1 November 1944.

In January 1945, the occupiers sent the last transport of prisoners from Radom to Auschwitz, but it only reached Częstochowa, while the remaining prisoners were massacred in Firlej.

On 16 January 1945, the city was captured by the Red Army, and then restored to Poland, although with a Soviet-installed communist regime, which then stayed in power until the Fall of Communism in the 1980s. Fallen Red Army soldiers rest at the local cemetery at Warszawska Street. The communists held Polish resistance members in the former German prison. In September 1945, the resistance movement attacked the communist prison and liberated nearly 500 prisoners.

Up to the Second World War, like many other cities in interwar Poland, Radom had a large Jewish population. According to the Imperial 1897 census, out of the total population of 28,700, Jews constituted 11,200 (~39%). A memorial for the Jewish families of Radom was erected in 1960 at New Montefiore Cemetery in New York.

=== Current events ===
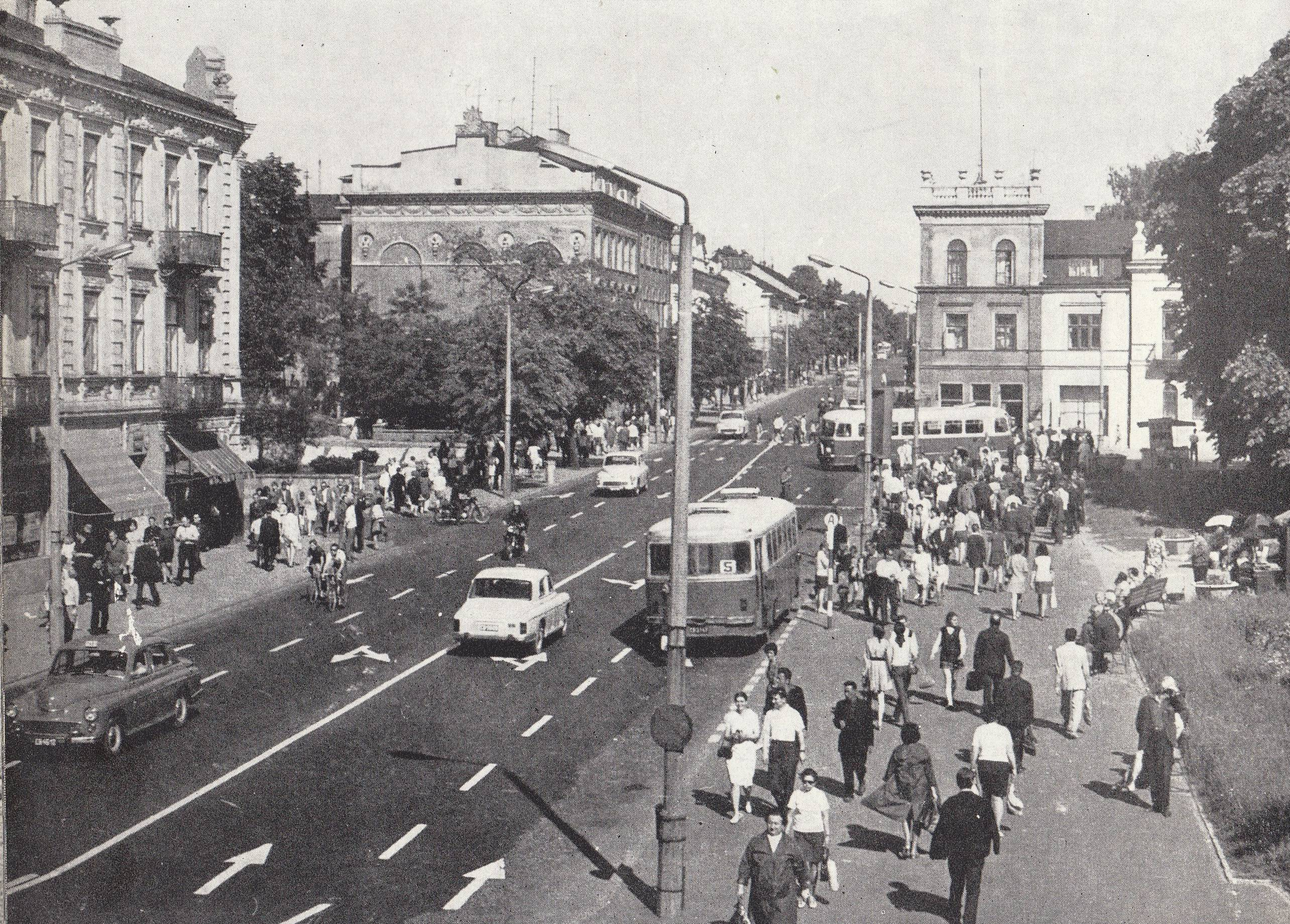
Radom in the 1970s

From 1951 to 1964, the Officers' Air Force School No. 5 was located in Radom. In 1954 and 1984, city limits were greatly expanded by including several settlements as new districts, including Długojów Górny, Huta Józefowska, Janiszpol, Józefów, Kierzków, Kończyce, Krychnowice, Krzewień, Malczew, Mleczna, Nowa Wola Gołębiowska, Nowiny Malczewskie, Stara Wola Gołębiowska, Wincentów, Wólka Klwatecka. From 1975 to 1998, it was the seat of the Radom Voivodeship.

In 2007, two pilots died in an accident at the air show, resulting in the cancellation of the rest of the event. On 30 August 2009, also during the air show, another two pilots who represented Belarus were killed when their plane crashed.

Radom was one of the main centres of the strike action taken by Polish health care workers in 2007.

== Geography ==
=== Climate ===
Radom has a humid continental climate (Köppen: Dfb).

Climate data for Radom
| Month | Jan | Feb | Mar | Apr | May | Jun | Jul | Aug | Sep | Oct | Nov | Dec | Year |
|---|---|---|---|---|---|---|---|---|---|---|---|---|---|
| Daily mean °C (°F) | −4.7 (23.5) | −3.3 (26.1) | 2.1 (35.8) | 8.4 (47.1) | 13.2 (55.8) | 16.4 (61.5) | 18.0 (64.4) | 17.4 (63.3) | 13.7 (56.7) | 8.8 (47.8) | 3.2 (37.8) | −1.9 (28.6) | 7.6 (45.7) |
| Average precipitation mm (inches) | 26 (1.0) | 25 (1.0) | 28 (1.1) | 37 (1.5) | 59 (2.3) | 76 (3.0) | 79 (3.1) | 66 (2.6) | 45 (1.8) | 36 (1.4) | 38 (1.5) | 34 (1.3) | 549 (21.6) |
Source: Climate-Data.org

=== Places of interest ===
Historic churches of Radom (examples)

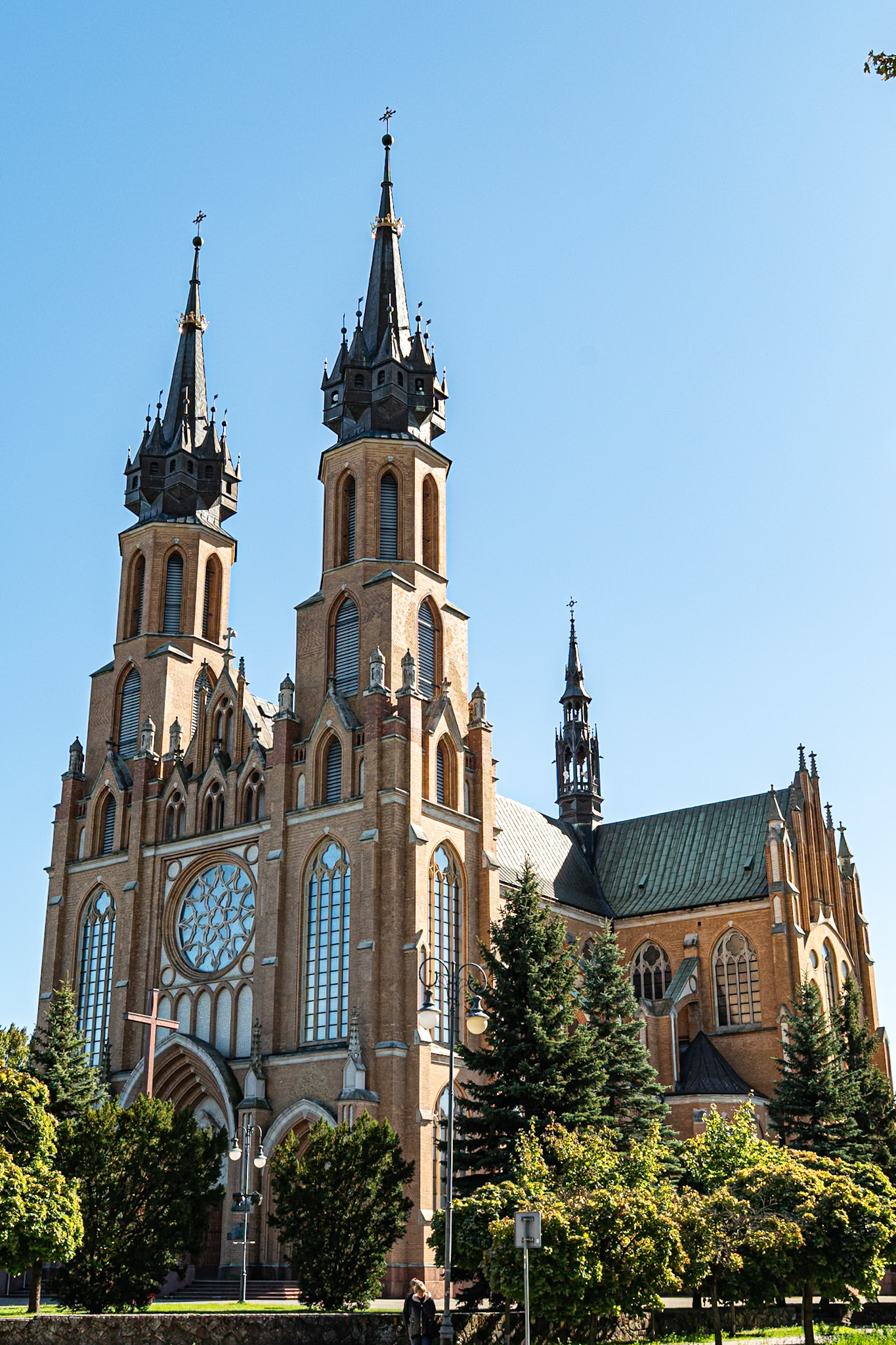
Radom Cathedral

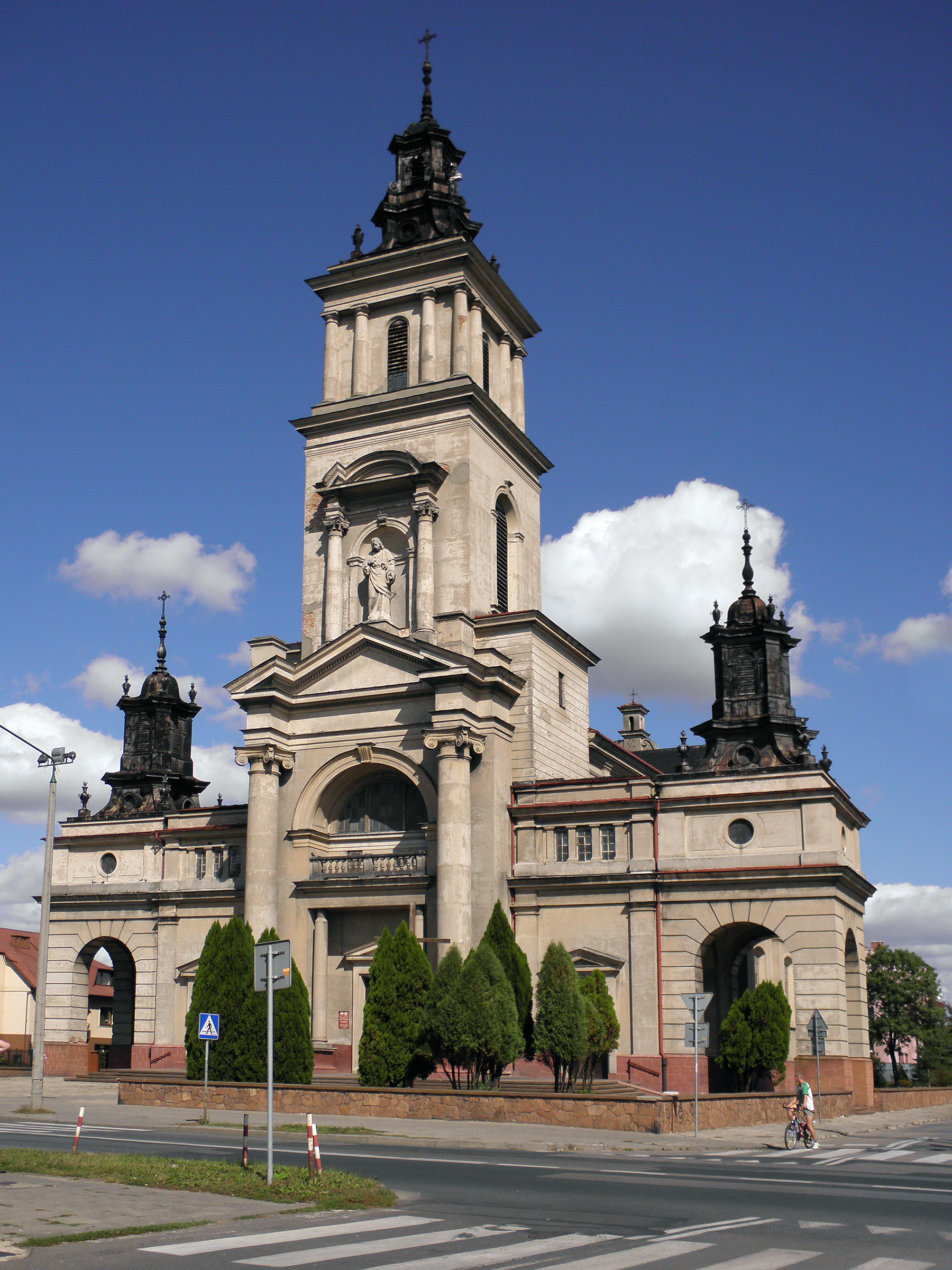
Sacred Heart of Jesus Church

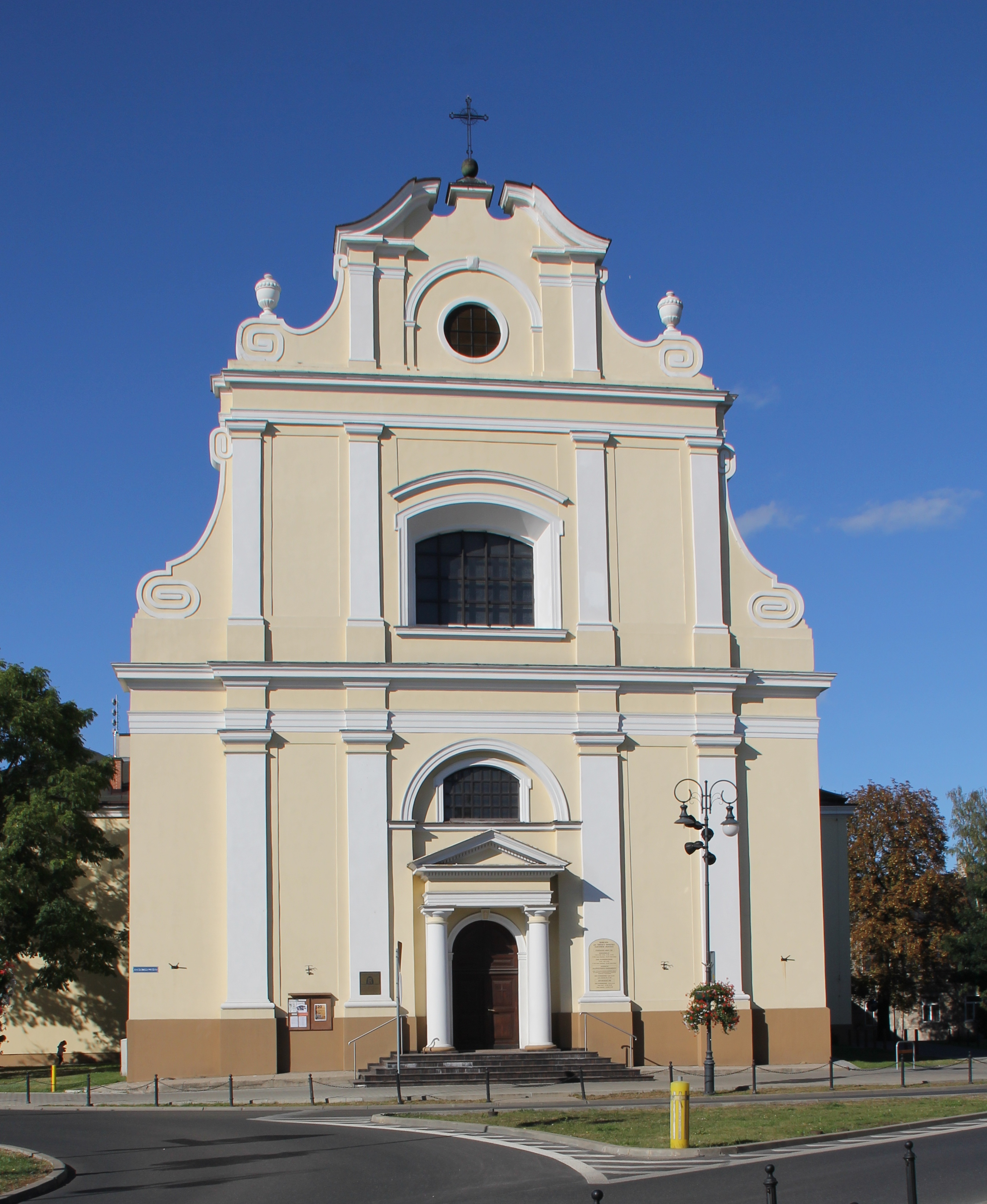
Holy Trinity Church

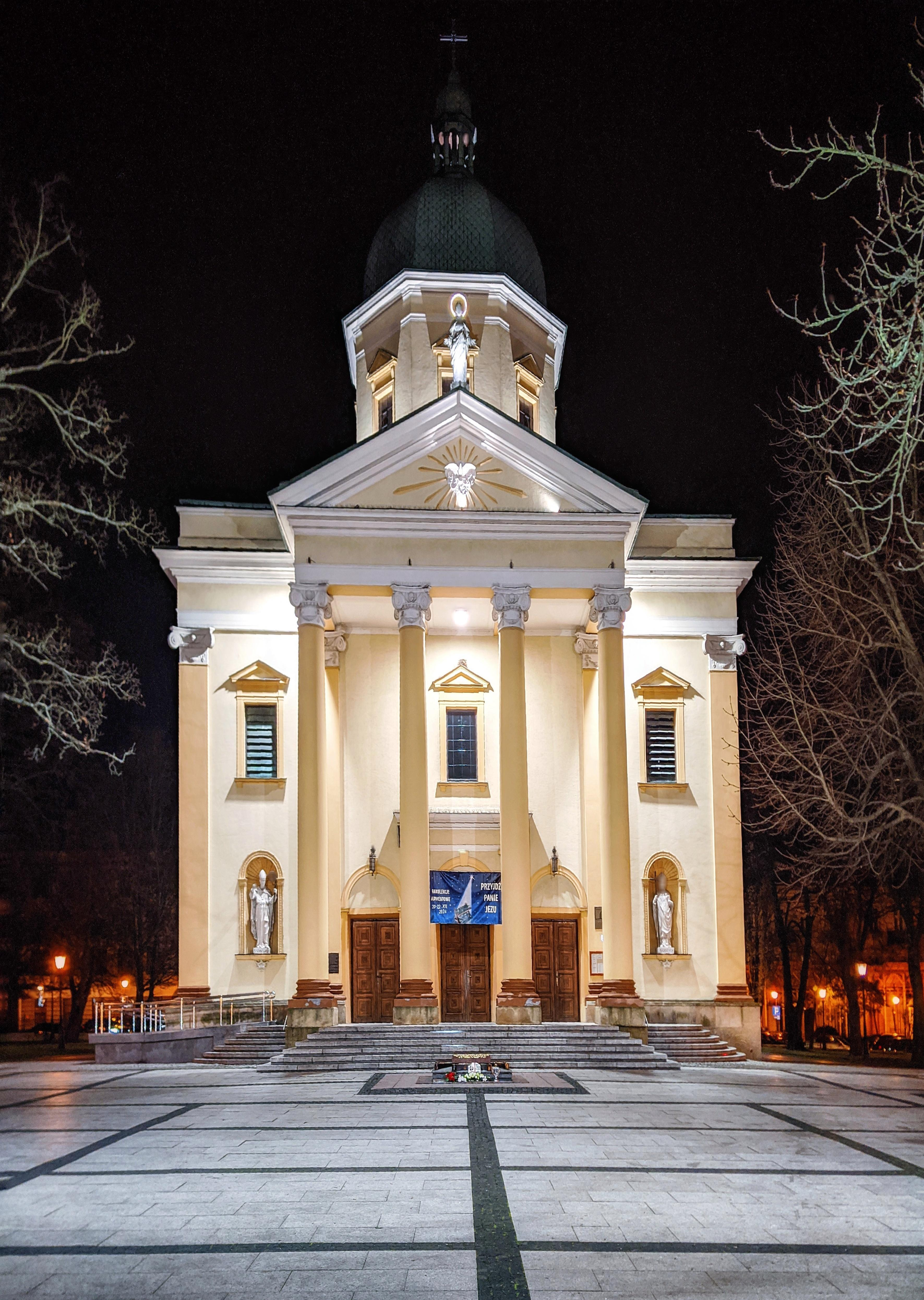
Saint Stanislaus church

- St. Wenceslaus Church in the Old Town Square: founded by Leszek I the White, built in the 13th century in Gothic style
- St. John the Baptist Church: founded by Casimir III, built in 1360–1370 in gothic style, and re-constructed many times
- Bernardine Church and monastery: founded by Casimir IV of Poland, built in 1468–1507, listed as a Historic Monument of Poland
- Holy Trinity Church: built in 1619–1627 in Baroque style, burned in a fire and was rebuilt in 1678–1691
- Gąska's and Esterka's Houses from the 16th–17th century
- Evangelical Church of the Augsburg Confession: built in 1785
- Sandomierz Palace: building of voivodeship council, built in 1825–1827, designed in classical style by Antonio Corazzi
- City hall: built in 1847–1848
- Cathedral of Virgin Mary: built in 1899–1908 in Gothic Revival style
- Resursa Citizen's Club building built in 1852
- Podworski House built in the Renaissance Revival style in 1867
- Tool gates: built in the nineteenth century in classical style
- Tadeusz Kościuszko Park opened in 1867
- Radom Air Show: the most popular air show in Poland

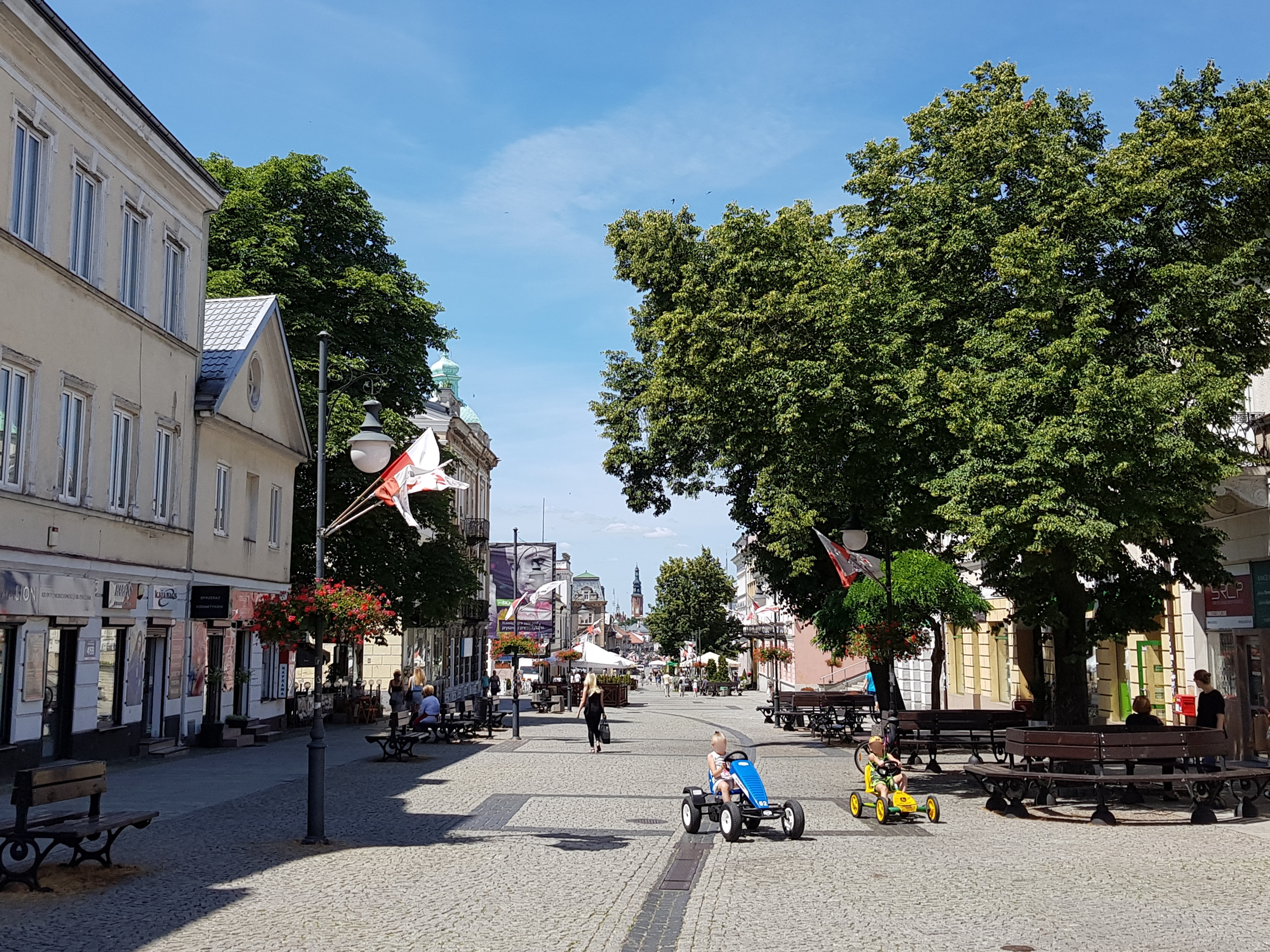
Żeromski Street, the city's main thoroughfare

== Demographics ==
Historical population

| Year | Pop. | ±% |
|---|---|---|
| 1921 | 61,599 | — |
| 1931 | 78,073 | +26.7% |
| 1939 | 85,501 | +9.5% |
| 1950 | 80,298 | −6.1% |
| 1960 | 130,116 | +62.0% |
| 1970 | 159,480 | +22.6% |

| Year | Pop. | ±% |
|---|---|---|
| 1980 | 191,053 | +19.8% |
| 1990 | 228,487 | +19.6% |
| 2000 | 230,492 | +0.9% |
| 2010 | 222,496 | −3.5% |
| 2020 | 209,296 | −5.9% |

== Culture ==
=== Museums and art galleries ===
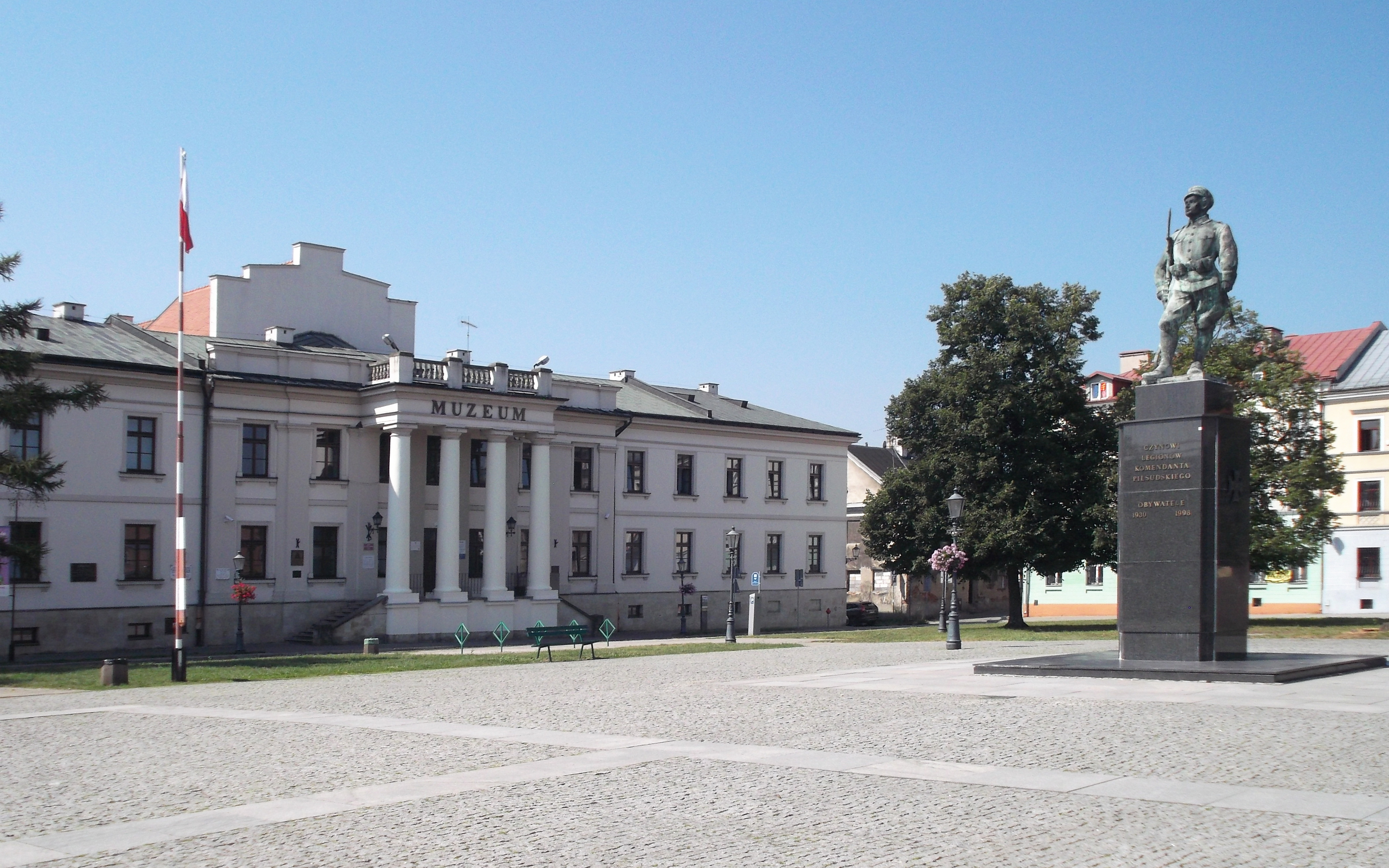
Jacek Malczewski Museum and Polish Legions monument

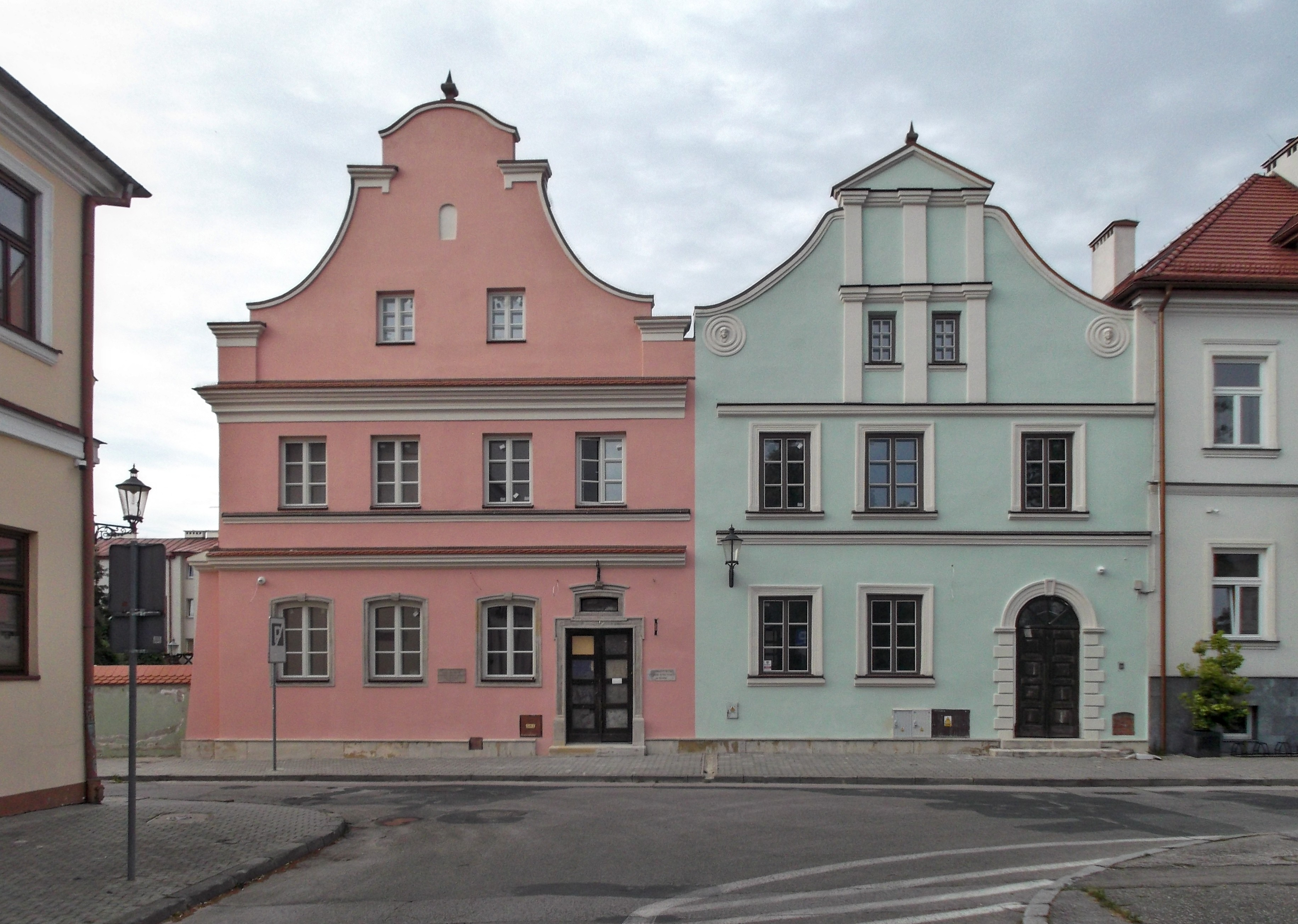
Radom History Museum

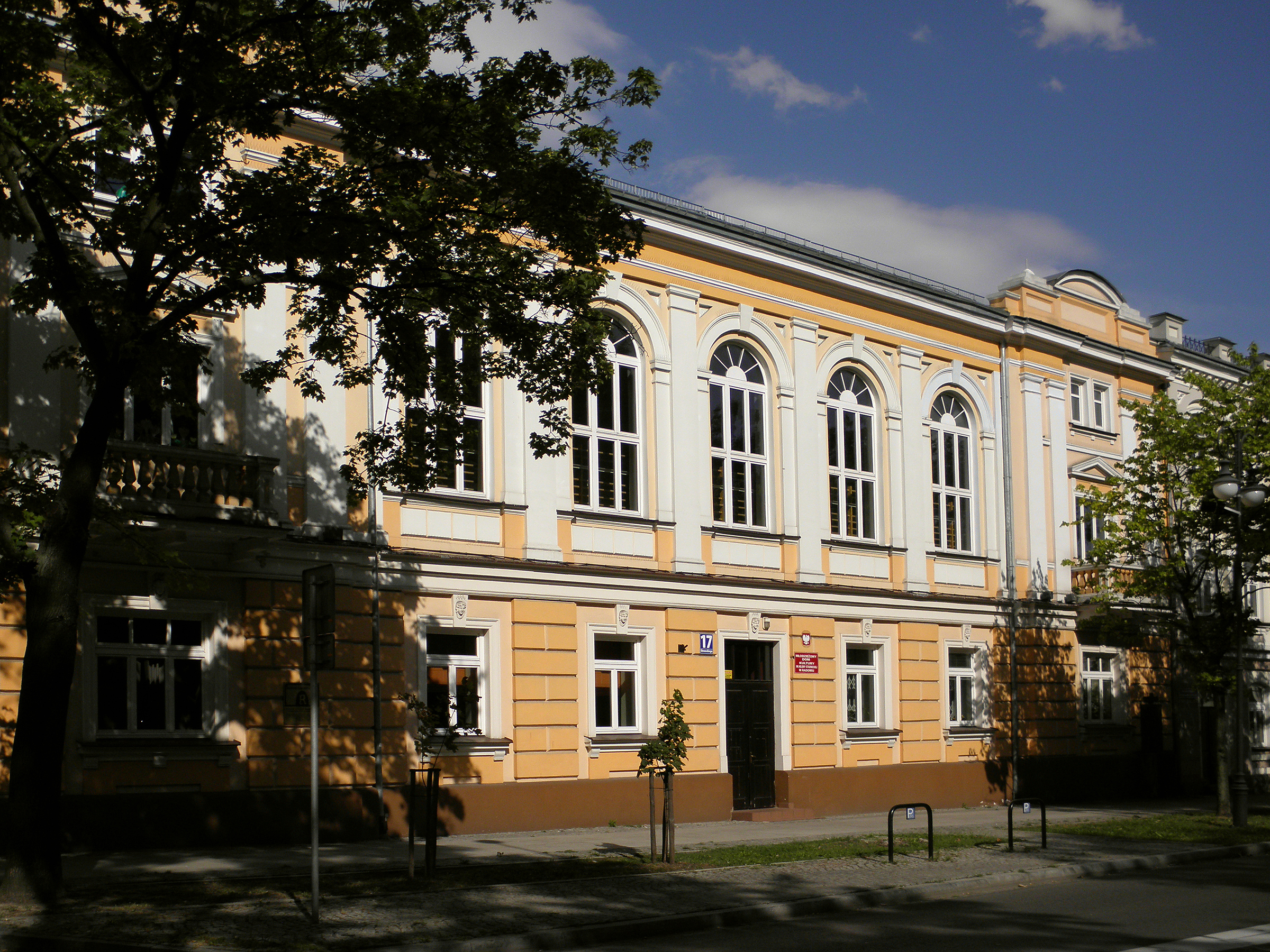
Radom Scouting Museum

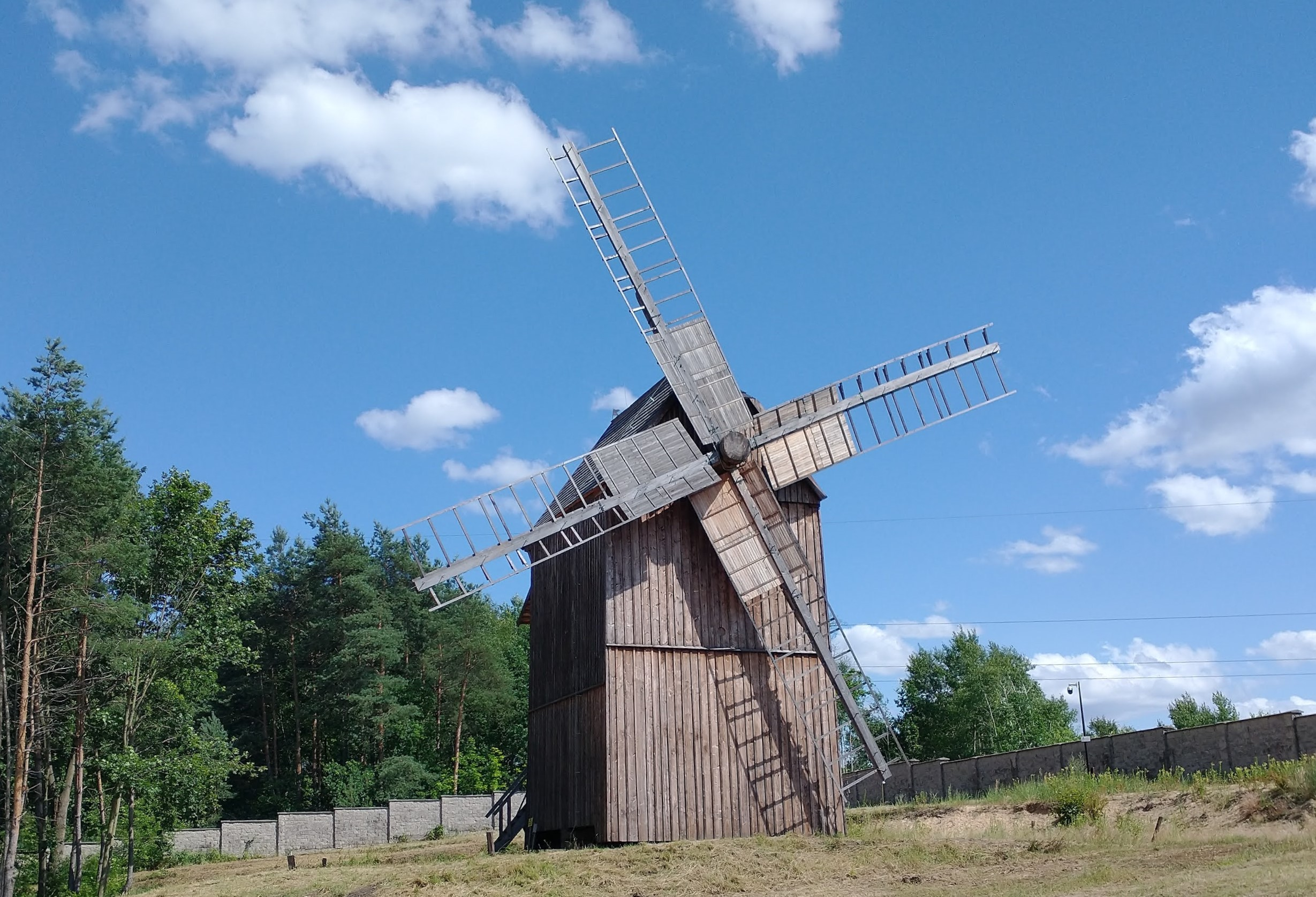
Radom Countryside Museum

- Jacek Malczewski Museum dedicated to the painter
- Modern art museum
- Scouting Museum
- "Elektrownia" – Power station built in 1903, renewed as a Modern art gallery
- Cultural Heritage Gallery of Radom
- Radom Countryside Museum, an open-air museum

=== Philharmonic ===
- Radom Chamber Orchestra established in 2007

=== Theatre ===
- Jan Kochanowski Theatre

=== Cinemas ===
- Elektrownia
- Helios cinema
- Hel (currently not functioning)
- Multikino cinema

== Sports ==
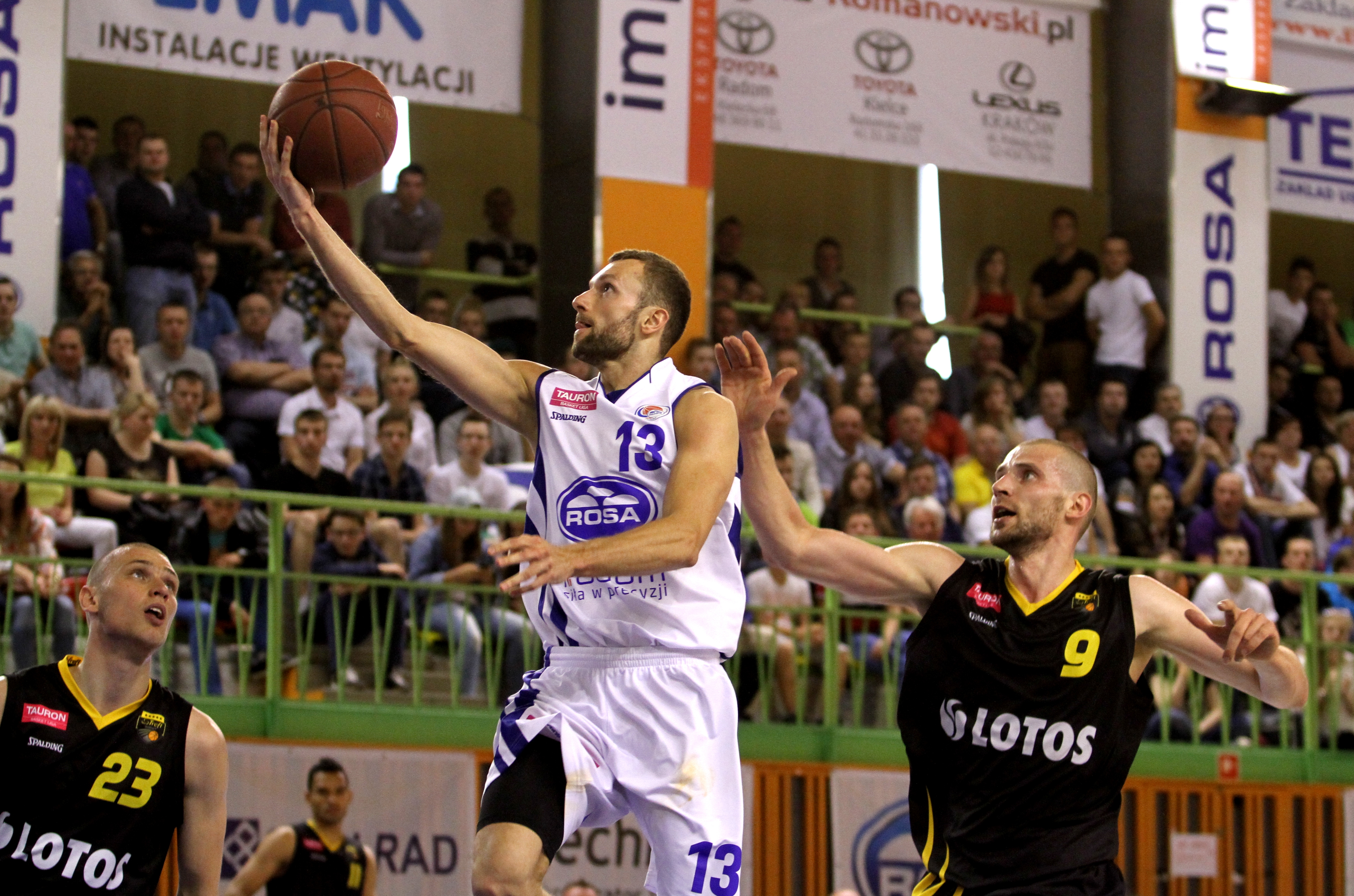
Polish Basketball League match between Rosa Radom and Trefl Sopot in Radom in 2014

- Czarni Radom – men's volleyball team, founded in 1921, currently playing in the I liga (Poland's second tier, as of 2026–27); 1999 Polish Cup winners.
- Rosa Radom – men's basketball team, founded in 2003, currently playing in the Polish Basketball League (country's top division); 2016 Polish Cup winners.
- Radomiak Radom – men's football team, founded in 1910, currently playing in the Ekstraklasa (top tier, as of 2026–27).
- Broń Radom – men's football] team, founded in 1926, currently playing in the IV liga (fifth tier, as of 2026–27).
- Jadar Radom – defunct men's volleyball team, which played in the PlusLiga in 2006–10.

== Transport ==
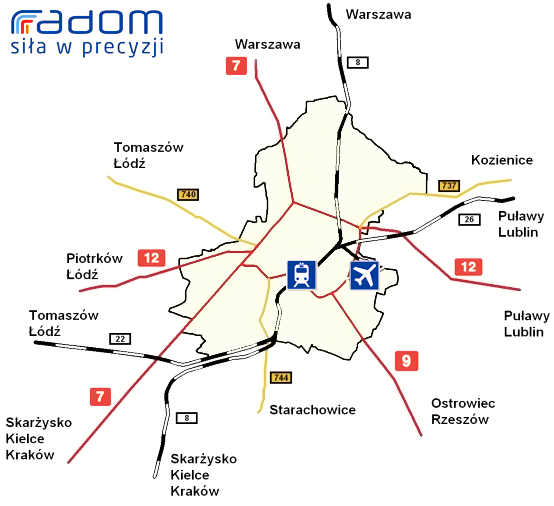
Transport in Radom

Radom is an important railroad junction, where two lines meet: east–west connection from Lublin to Łódź, and north–south from Warsaw to Kielce, and Kraków. The city is also located close to European route E77, here the European route E371 begins, which runs southwards, to Slovakia. The famous Radom Air Show takes place at Radom Airport, an airport located 3.5 km (2 mi) from the center of Radom.

Transport in Radom – Gallery

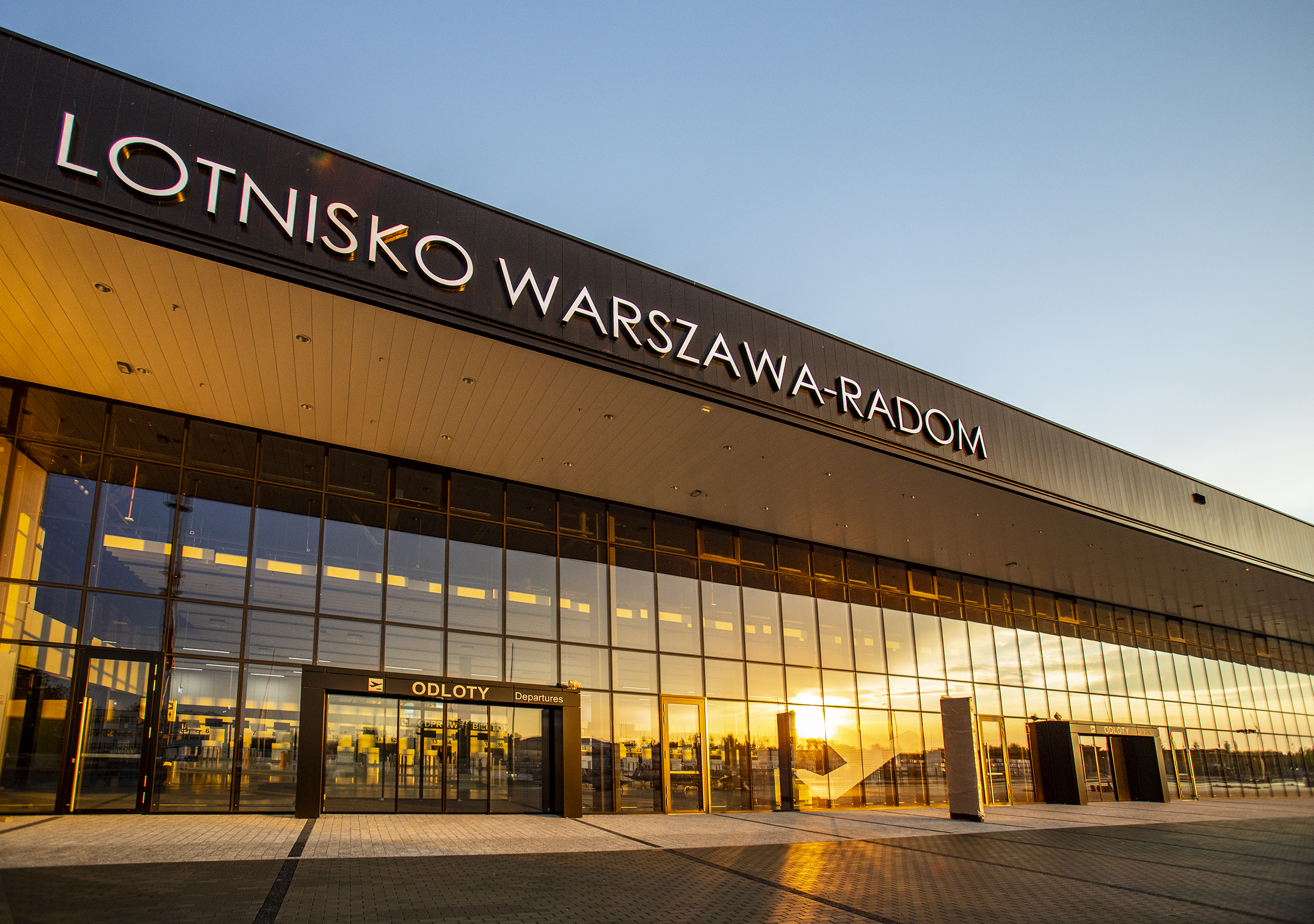
Radom Airport

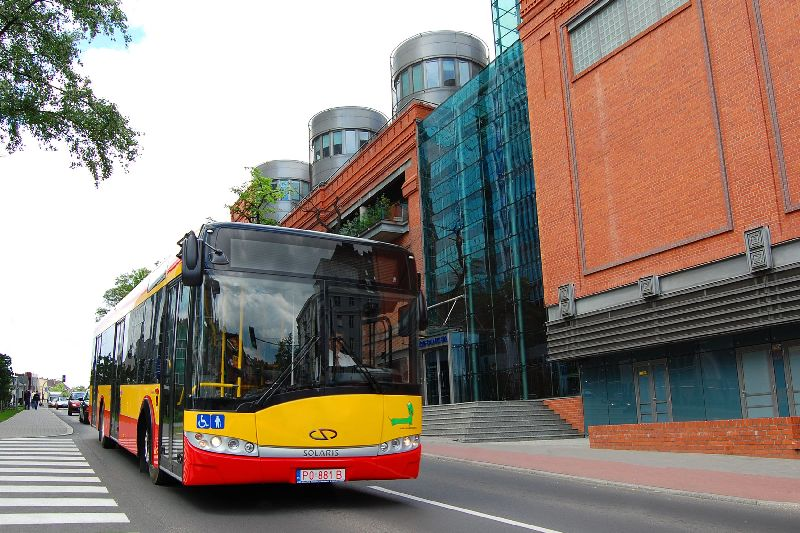
Bus Solaris Urbino 12

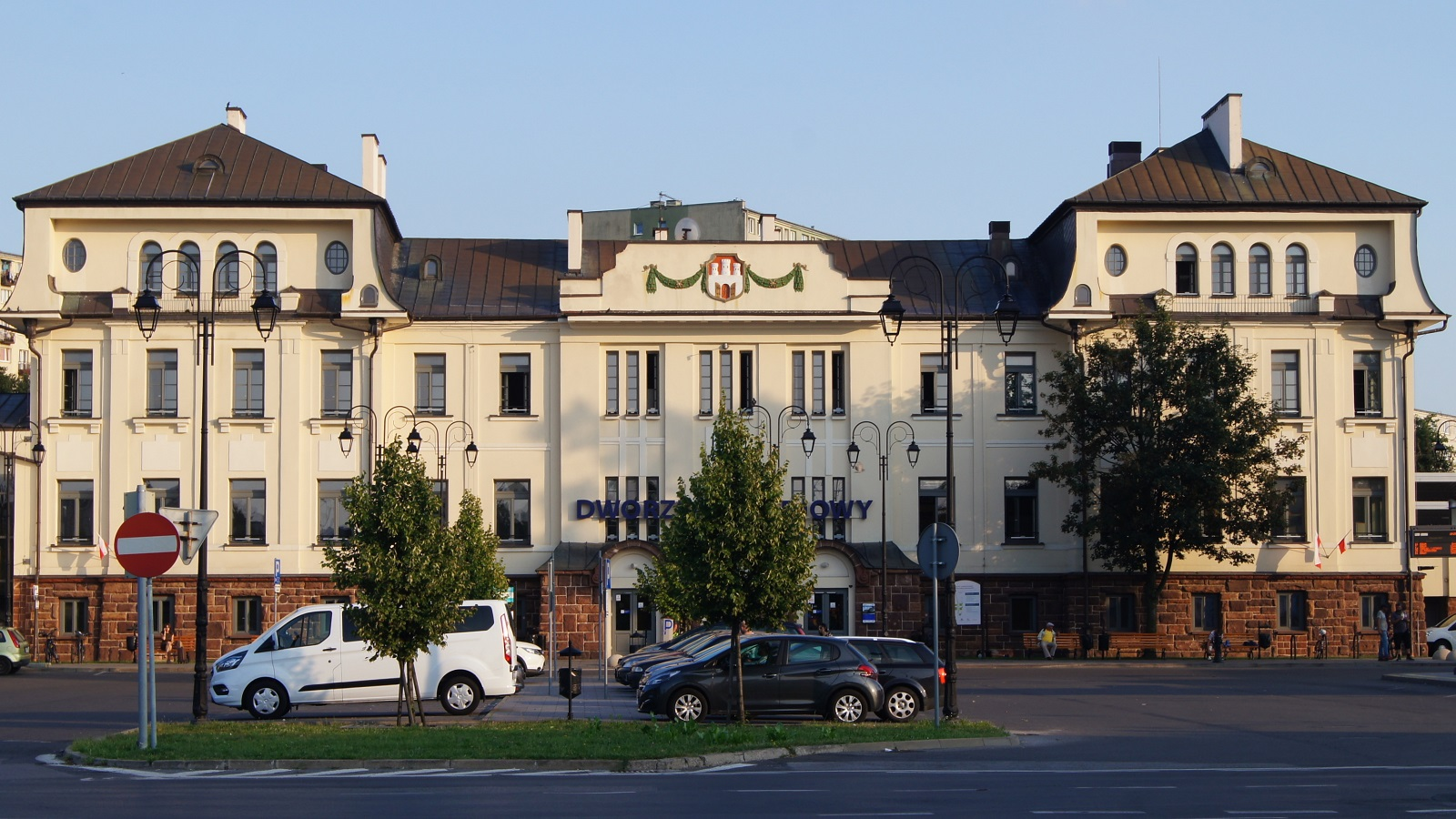
Main railway station

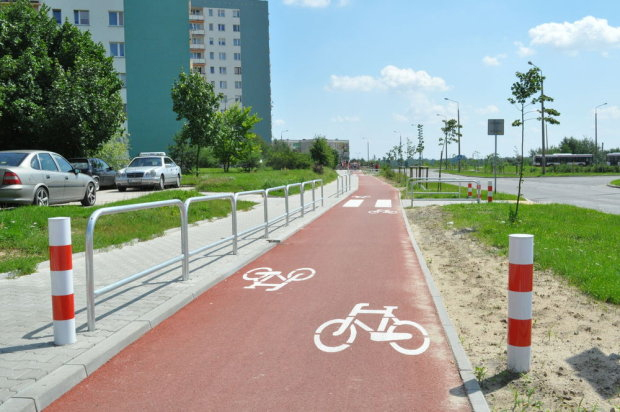
Biking in Radom

== Education ==
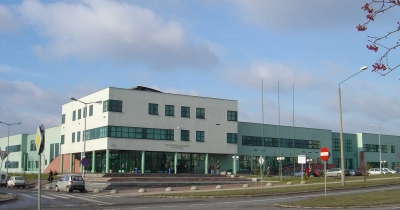
Faculty of Economics of the University of Radom

Radom is home to about 20 schools of higher education:

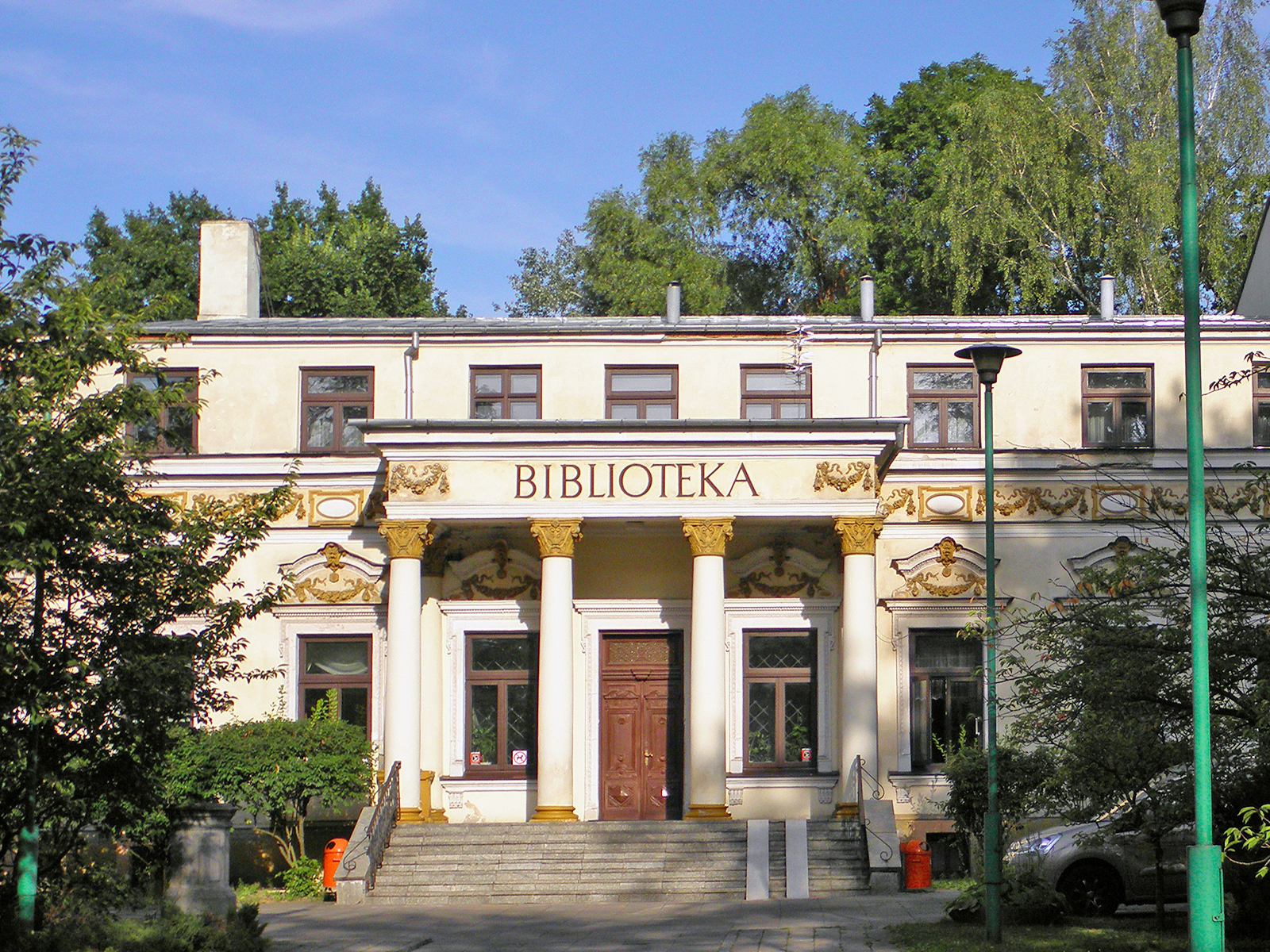
Public Library

- University of Radom (Uniwersytet Radomski)
- Instytut Teologiczny Uniwersytetu Kardynała Stefana Wyszyńskiego w Radomiu – department of theology
- Kolegium Nauczycielskie
- Nauczycielskie Kolegium Języków Obcych
- Niepubliczne Nauczycielskie Kolegium Języków Obcych
- Niepubliczne Nauczycielskie Kolegium Języków Obcych TWP
- University College of Environmental Sciences (Wyższa Szkoła Ochrony Środowiska)
- Radomska Szkoła Zarządzania
- Warsaw Agricultural University – department in Radom (Szkoła Główna Gospodarstwa Wiejskiego w Warszawie)
- College of the Maria Curie-Skłodowska University (Kolegium licencjackie Uniwersytetu Marii Curie-Skłodowskiej)
- Warsaw University – department in Radom (Uniwersytet Warszawski)
- Maria Curie-Skłodowska University – department in Radom (Uniwersytet Marii Curie-Skłodowskiej)
- Wyższa Inżynierska Szkoła Bezpieczeństwa i Organizacji Pracy
- Higher Business College (Wyższa Szkoła Biznesu)
- Higher Financial and Banking College (Wyższa Szkoła Finansów i Bankowości)
- Higher Merchant College (Wyższa Szkoła Handlowa)
- Higher Seminary (Wyższe Seminarium Duchowne)
- Higher Journalis College (Wyższa Szkoła Dziennikarska)
- Zespół Szkół Medycznych

== Other ==
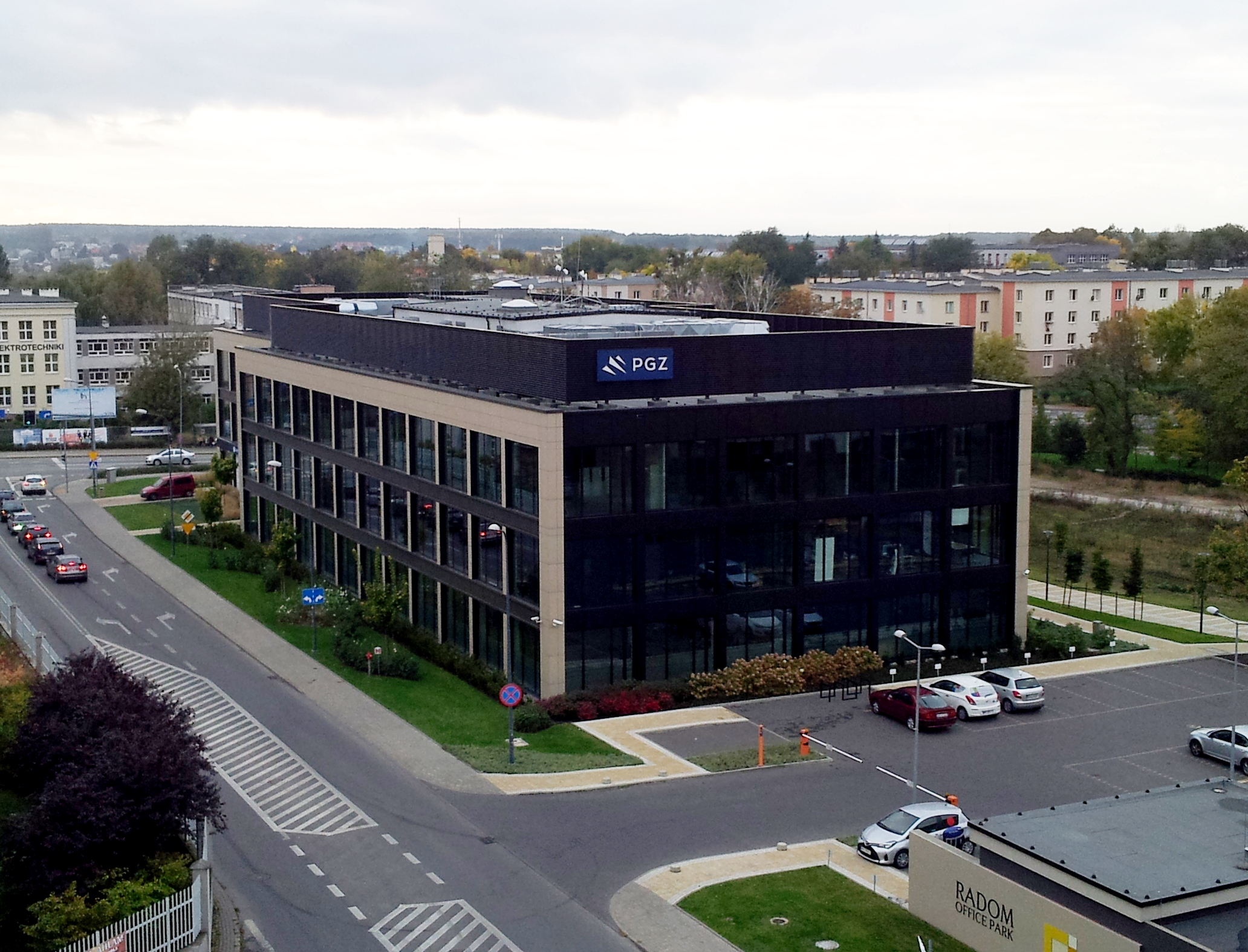
Headquarters of Polish Armaments Group

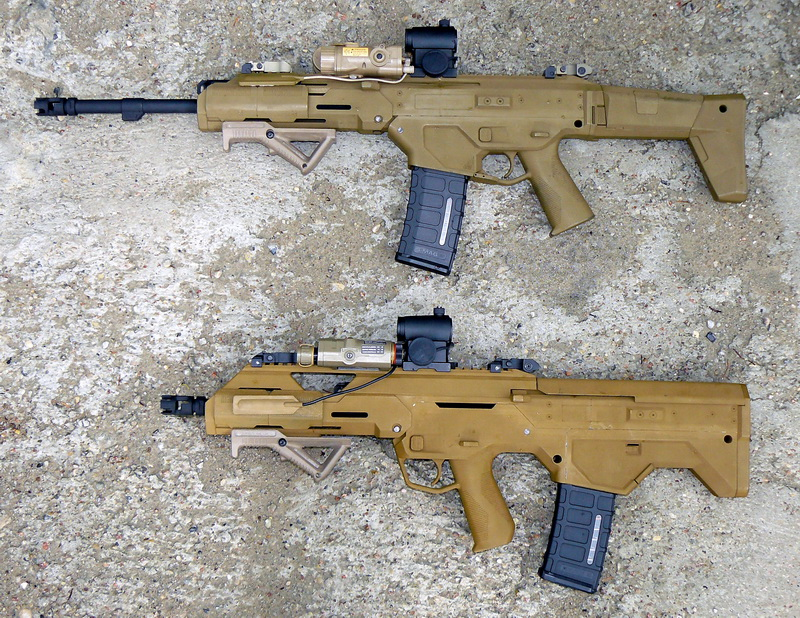
MSBS rifle from Łucznik Arms Factory

- At the Western part of Radom, there is a facility for commercial LF transmission (not broadcasting), the Radom longwave transmitter
- The Łucznik Arms Factory in Radom produces a range of military firearms such as assault rifles
- The book, Outcry – Holocaust Memoirs, by Manny Steinberg, chronicles a young Jewish man's life and trials during the Nazi German occupation of Radom and beyond. Published by Amsterdam Publishers, The Netherlands in 2014.
- The Kurc family lives in Radom at the opening of the narrative non-fiction novel We Were the Lucky Ones by Georgia Hunter.

== Politics ==
Members of Parliament (Sejm) elected from Radom constituency

- Ewa Kopacz (PO)
- Dariusz Bąk (PIS)
- Mirosław Maliszewski (PSL)
- Czesław Czechyra (PO)
- Marek Suski (PIS)
- Marek Wikiński (SLD),
- Radosław Witkowski (PO)
- Krzysztof Sońta (PIS)
- Sandra Pachocka (NIC)

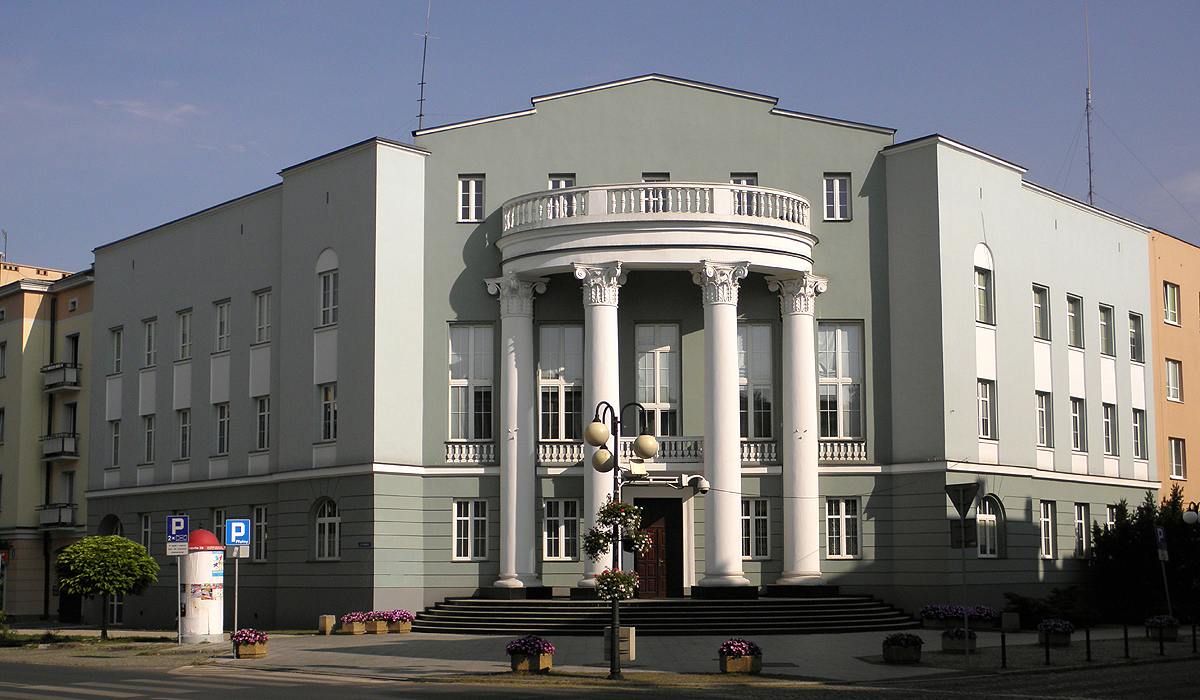
City Council

== Twin towns – sister cities ==
Radom is twinned with:

- Banská Bystrica, Slovakia (since 2001)
- Daugavpils, Latvia
- Huzhou, Zhejiang, People's Republic of China
- Magdeburg, Germany
- Ploiești, Romania
- Vilnius District Municipality, Lithuania
- Stara Zagora, Bulgaria
- Taoyuan District, Taiwan
- Talavera de la Reina, Spain
- Ternopil, Ukraine

Former twin towns:

- Homyel, Belarus
- Ozyory, Moscow Oblast, Russia

On 28 February 2022, Radom ended its partnership with the Russian city of Ozyory and the Belarusian city of Homyel as a reaction to the 2022 Russian invasion of Ukraine.

== Notable people ==
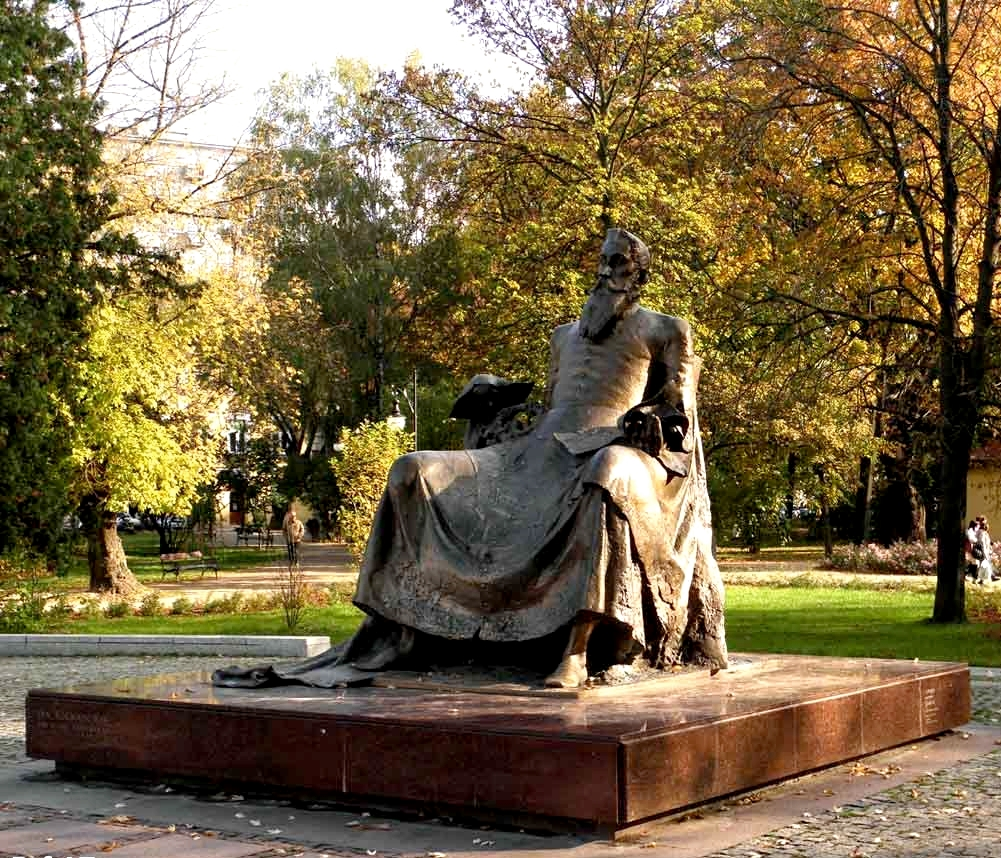
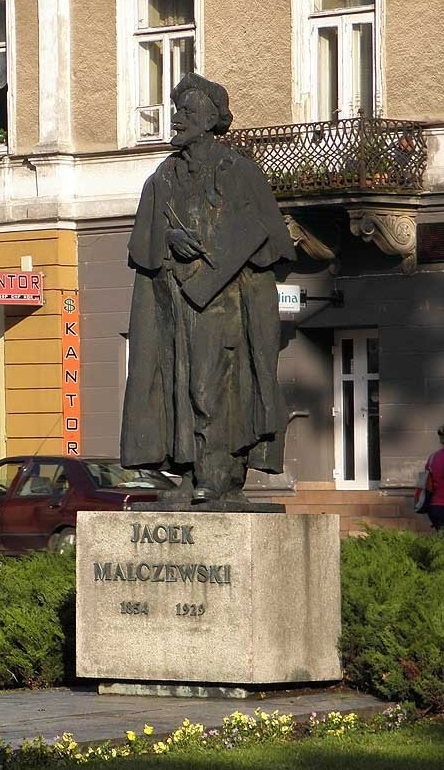
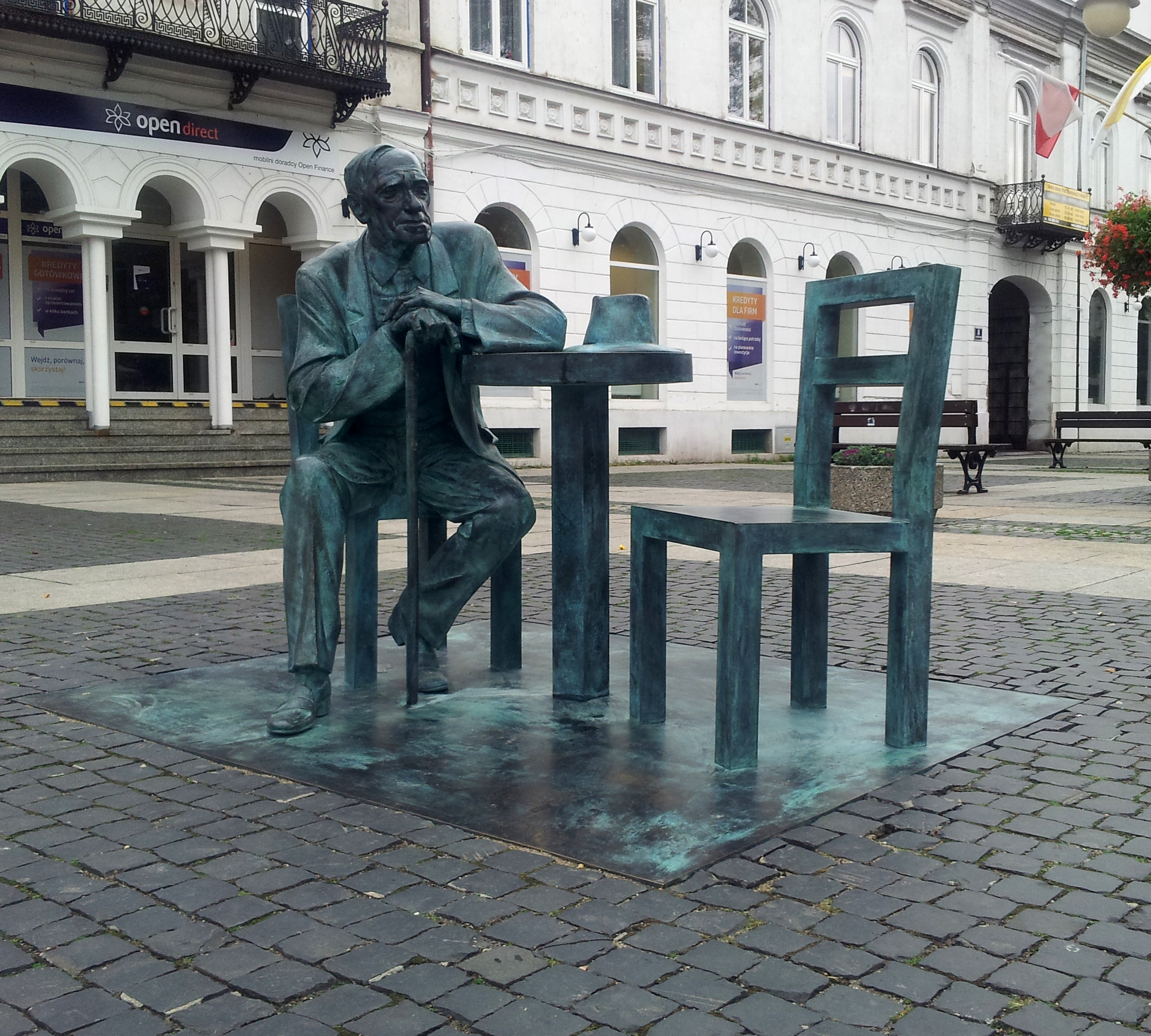
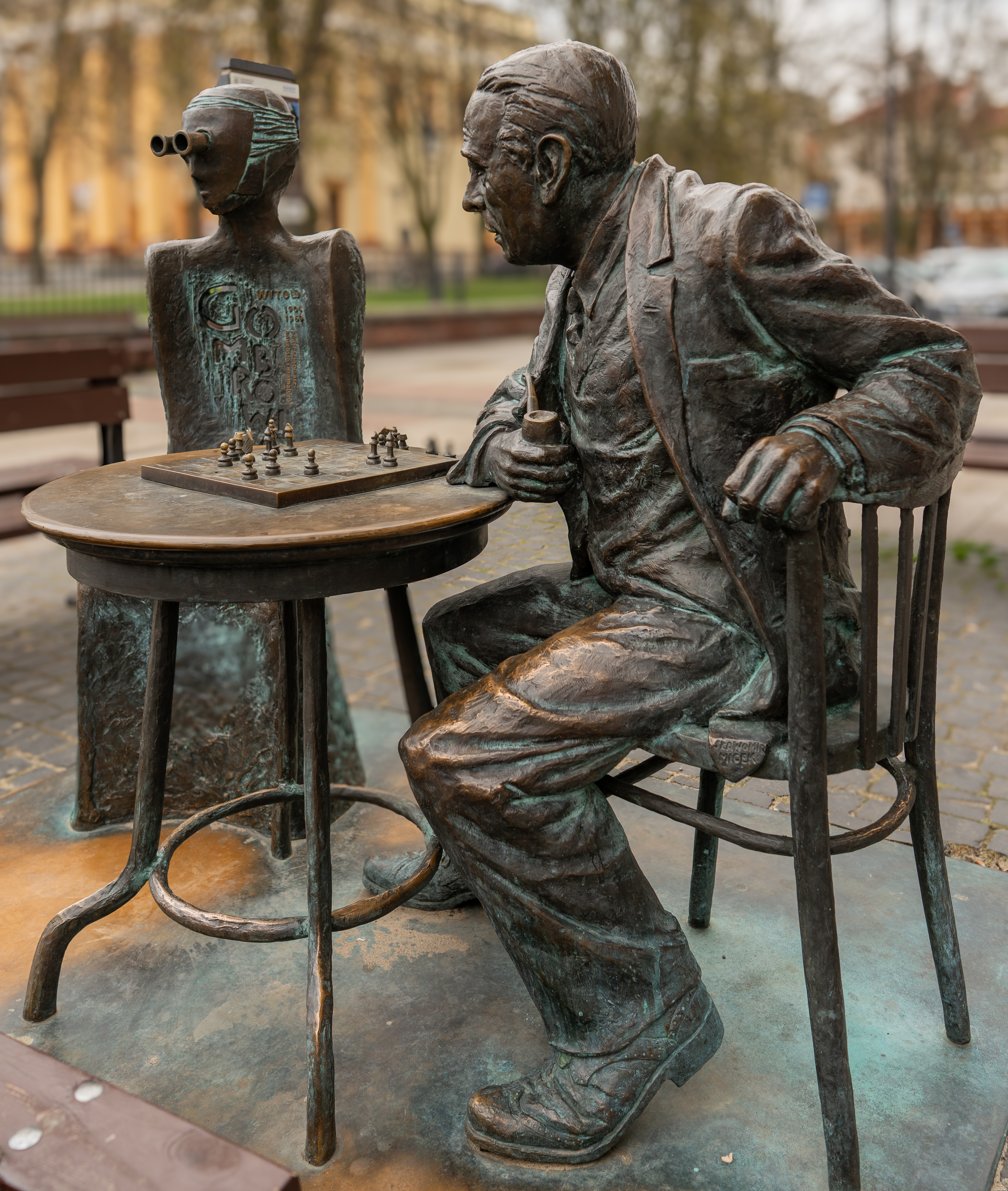
Monuments to prominent figures associated with Radom: Jan Kochanowski, Jacek Malczewski, Leszek Kołakowski, Witold Gombrowicz

Notable people who have been born, have lived or have worked in Radom:

- Józef Brandt (1841–1915), painter
- Henia Bryer (born 1925), Holocaust survivor, subject and narrator of the autobiographical film Prisoner Number A26188: Henia Bryer
- Iga Cembrzyńska (born 1939), actress, singer, composer and screenwriter
- Tytus Chałubiński (1820–1889), physician, professor of the Medical-Surgical Academy and of the Principal School in Warsaw, co-founder of the Polish Tatra Society
- Jan Chrapek (1948–2001), local bishop
- Małgorzata Foremniak (born 1967), actress
- Artur Gadowski (born 1967), singer
- Witold Gombrowicz (1904–1969), writer and playwright.
- Bernard Gotfryd (1924–2016), photographer
- Igor Grobelny (born 1993), Belgian volleyball player
- Kaja Grobelna (born 1995), Belgian volleyball player
- Stanisław Gronkowski (1922–2004), actor
- Andrzej Jajszczyk (born 1952), professor and scientist
- Michał Karbownik (born 2001), footballer
- Kazimierz Kelles-Krauz (1872–1905), philosopher and sociologist
- Jan Kochanowski (1530–1584), Renaissance poet who established poetic patterns that would become integral to the Polish literary language, considered the greatest Slavic poet prior to the 19th century
- Oskar Kolberg (1814–1890), ethnographer, folklorist and composer
- Leszek Kołakowski (1927–2009), philosopher and historian of ideas
- Jan Krugier (1928–2008), Swiss art dealer
- Tomasz Kupisz (born 1990), footballer
- Hilary Majewski (1838–1892), architect
- Jacek Malczewski (1854–1929), painter, one of the most important artists of Poland, associated with the patriotic Young Poland movement
- Marian Mazur (1909 –1983), scientist, founder of the Polish school of cybernetics
- Eva Mekler (born 1945), American novelist and author of the prolific "Actors' Scenebook" series, novels Sunrise Shows Late and The Polish Woman, was born in Radom in the aftermath of World War II
- Kazimierz Ołdakowski (1878–1940), prewar director of Fabryka Broni
- Jerzy Połomski (born 1933), singer
- Mikołaj z Radomia (c. 1400–1450), mediaeval composer
- Dariusz Rosati (born 1946), MEP, professor of economics, ex-minister of foreign affairs
- Zygmunt Solorz (born 1956), entrepreneur and billionaire, president of Polsat TV and owner of Polkomtel
- Adolf Schulz-Evler (1852 – 15 May 1905), Polish-born composer
- Włodzimierz Sedlak (1911–1993), priest and scientist
- Piotr Dominik Siara (born 1983), rapper going under the name of "Kękę"
- Maciej Skorża (born 1972), Polish football coach and former football player.
- Hersh Mendel ‘Manny’ Steinberg (1925–2015), author, Holocaust survivor
- Andrzej Wajda (1926–2016), Academy Award-winning film director, considered one of the greatest filmmakers in the history of Polish cinema
- Marvin Weintraub (1924–2021), Canadian scientist
- Helen Weinzweig (1915–2010), Canadian writer
- Jan Woleński (born 1940), philosopher
- Szymon Wydra (born 1976), singer
