= Włodzimierz Sedlak =

Włodzimierz Sedlak (Polish pronunciation: [vwɔˈd͡ʑi.mjɛʂ sɛdlak]) (born 31 October 1911 in Sosnowiec, and died on 17 February 1993 in Radom) was a Polish priest, professor at John Paul II Catholic University of Lublin, father of Polish bioelectronics and electromagnetic theory of life.

He was an Honorary citizen of Sosnowiec, Radom and Skarżysko-Kamienna.

== See also ==
- List of Roman Catholic scientist-clerics
