= Saint John the Baptist Church =

The Church of Saint John the Baptist, Saint John the Baptist('s) Church, or variants thereof, may refer to:

== Armenia ==
- Saint John the Baptist Church, Abovyan
- Saint John the Baptist Church, Yerevan

== Australia ==
- St John the Baptist Church, Reid, Canberra, Anglican
- St John the Baptist Church, Ashfield, New South Wales
- St John the Baptist Anglican Church, Bulimba, Queensland
- St John the Baptist Anglican Church, Dongara, Western Australia
- St John the Baptist Anglican Church, Richmond, North Queensland
- St. John the Baptist Macedonian Orthodox Church, Geelong, Victoria
- St John the Baptist's Church, Waubra, Victoria
- St John the Baptist Church, Toodyay, Western Australia, Roman Catholic
- St John the Baptist Church, Toodyay (1863–1963)

== Brazil ==
- Church of Saint John the Baptist (Belém)

== Belgium ==
- Church of St. John the Baptist, Molenbeek

== Bosnia and Herzegovina ==
- Saint John the Baptist Church, Livno

== Bulgaria ==
- Church of Saint John the Baptist, Nesebar

== Burma/Myanmar ==
- St. John the Baptist Church, Yangon

== Canada ==
- Saint-Jean-Baptiste Church (Montreal)
- St. John the Baptist Ukrainian Catholic National Shrine (Ottawa)
- Church of Saint John the Baptist (Port-Royal)
- Saint-Jean-Baptiste Church (Quebec City)
- Saint-Jean-Baptiste Church (Sherbrooke)

== France ==
- Église Saint-Jean-Baptiste du Faubourg in Aix-en-Provence
- Église Saint-Jean-Baptiste de Bastia
- Église Saint-Jean-Baptiste, Buhl, Haut-Rhin), with the Buhl Altarpiece
- Église Saint-Jean-Baptiste de La Porta
- Église Saint-Jean-Baptiste (Virargues)

== Georgia ==
- Church of St. John the Baptist in Petra, Lazica (archaeological site)

== Greece ==
- Church of St John of the Collachium, Rhodes

== India ==
- St. John the Baptist Church, Mumbai

== Israel/Palestine ==
- Roman Catholic Church of Saint John the Baptist, Ein Karem, Jerusalem
- Greek Orthodox Church of Saint John the Baptist, Jerusalem
- Church of the Visitation (formerly: "Abbey Church of St John in the Woods")
- Saint John the Baptist Church, Acre

== Italy ==
- Church of Saint John the Baptist, Busto Arsizio
- St. John the Baptist Church, San Giovanni di Duino

== Malta ==
- Rotunda of Xewkija (Church of St John the Baptist)

== New Zealand ==
- Church of St. John the Baptist (Parnell, Auckland)
- St John the Baptist Church, Christchurch
- St. John the Baptist Church (Waimate North)

== Norway ==
- Saint John the Baptist's Church, Sandefjord

== Philippines ==
- San Juan Bautista Church (Calumpit), Bulacan
- Saint John the Baptist Parish Church (Calamba), Laguna
- Saint John the Baptist Parish Church (Liliw), Laguna
- Pinaglabanan Church (St. John the Baptist Parish), Pinaglabanan, San Juan City
- Tabaco Church (Saint John the Baptist Parish Church), Tabaco, Albay
- St John the Baptist Church (Taytay, Rizal)

== Poland ==
- St. John the Baptist Church, Kraków
- Church of St. John the Baptist, Radom

== Romania ==
- St. John the Baptist Church, Caransebeș
- Saint John the Baptist Church, Iași
- Saint John the Baptist Church, Târgu Mureș

== Russia ==
- Church of St John the Baptist, Kerch
- Church of John the Baptist (Nesvetay)
- St. John the Baptist Church, Saint Petersburg
- St. John the Baptist Church, Yaroslavl

== Slovakia ==
- St John the Baptist's Church (Rimavská Sobota)

== Sweden ==
- St. John the Baptist's Church, Landskrona

== Turkey ==
- Hirami Ahmet Pasha Mosque, formerly Church of Saint John the Baptist en to Trullo (Constantinople)
- Fenari Isa Mosque, formerly Church of Saint John the Baptist at Lips (Constantinople)

== United Kingdom ==
=== England ===
==== Berkshire ====
- St John the Baptist Church, Windsor

==== Bristol ====
- Church of St John the Baptist, Bristol
- St John the Baptist, Frenchay

==== Cambridgeshire ====
- St John the Baptist's Church, Papworth St Agnes
- St John the Baptist Church, Peterborough

==== Cheshire ====
- St John the Baptist's Church, Aldford
- St John the Baptist's Church, Bollington
- St John the Baptist's Church, Chester
- St John the Baptist's Church, Guilden Sutton
- St John the Baptist's Church, Hartford
- St John the Baptist's Church, Knutsford
- St John the Baptist's Church, Smallwood

==== Cornwall ====
- Church of St Morwenna and St John the Baptist, Morwenstow

==== County Durham ====
- St John the Baptist, Egglescliffe

==== Cumbria ====
- St John the Baptist, Corney
- St John the Baptist's Church, Flookburgh

==== Derbyshire ====
- St John the Baptist's Church, Ault Hucknall
- St John the Baptist, Tideswell

==== Devon ====
- Church of St John the Baptist, Lustleigh

==== Dorset ====
- St John the Baptist's Church, Moordown

==== East Sussex ====
- St John the Baptist's Church, Brighton
- St John the Baptist's Church, Hove

==== Essex ====
- St John the Baptist Church, Finchingfield
- St. John the Baptist Church, Little Maplestead

==== Gloucestershire ====
- Church of St. John the Baptist, Cirencester
- Church of St. John the Baptist, Harescrombe
- St John the Baptist's Church, Tredington

==== Greater Manchester ====
- St John the Baptist Church, Rochdale
- St John the Baptist's Church, Smallbridge

==== Hampshire ====
- St. John the Baptist Church, Winchester

==== Hertfordshire ====
- Church of St John the Baptist, Royston, Hertfordshire

==== Isle of Wight ====
- Church of St John the Baptist, Newport
- Church of St John the Baptist, Niton
- Church of St John the Baptist, Northwood
- St John the Baptist Church, Yaverland

==== Kent ====
- St John the Baptist, Penshurst

==== Lancashire ====
- St John the Baptist's Church, Arkholme
- St John the Baptist's Church, Bretherton
- St John the Baptist's Church, Broughton
- St John the Baptist Church, Burscough

==== Leicestershire ====
- Church of St John the Baptist, Billesdon
- Church of St John the Baptist, Belton

==== Lincolnshire ====
- St John the Baptist's Church, Burringham
- St John the Baptist's Church, Sutterby

==== London ====
- St John the Baptist Church, Chipping Barnet
- St John the Baptist Church, Croydon, now officially Croydon Minster
- St John the Baptist, Hoxton
- St John the Baptist, Kentish Town
- St John the Baptist, Pinner
- St John the Baptist, Holland Road, Kensington, a Grade I listed building by James Brooks

==== Merseyside ====
- St John the Baptist's Church, Earlestown
- Church of Saint John the Baptist, Liverpool

==== Norfolk ====
- St John the Baptist Church, Harleston
- St John Maddermarket, Norwich

==== Nottinghamshire ====
- Church of St John the Baptist, East Markham
- Church of St John the Baptist, Stanford on Soar

==== Northumberland ====
- St John the Baptist, Edlingham

==== North Yorkshire ====
- St John the Baptist Church, Kirk Hammerton
- St John the Baptist's Church, Stanwick

==== Oxfordshire ====
- Church of St John the Baptist, Burford

==== Shropshire ====
- St John the Baptist's Church, Hope Bagot

==== Somerset ====
- Church of St John the Baptist, Frome
- Church of St John the Baptist, Midsomer Norton
- Church of Saint John the Baptist, South Brewham

==== South Yorkshire ====
- Saint John the Baptist Church, Penistone
- Church of St John the Baptist, Royston, South Yorkshire

==== Staffordshire ====
- St John the Baptist's Church, Burslem
- Church of St John the Baptist, Great Haywood
- St John the Baptist's Church, Mayfield

==== Wiltshire ====
- St John the Baptist's Church, Allington

==== West Midlands ====
- St John the Baptist Church, Coventry
- St John the Baptist Church, Halesowen

==== West Sussex ====
- St John the Baptist's Church, Clayton
- St John the Baptist's Church, Crawley

==== West Yorkshire ====
- St John the Baptist Church, Adel
- St John the Baptist's Church, Halifax, now officially Halifax Minster
- St John the Baptist's Church, Tunstall

==== Worcestershire ====
- St John the Baptist Church, Bromsgrove
- St John the Baptist's Church, Strensham
- St John the Baptist, White Ladies Aston

=== Wales ===
- St John the Baptist Church, Cardiff
- St John the Baptist Church, Porthcawl

== United States ==
=== Alaska ===
- St. John the Baptist Church (Angoon, Alaska)
- St. John the Baptist Chapel, in Naknek

=== Arkansas ===
- St. John the Baptist Catholic Church (Brinkley, Arkansas)

=== California ===
- St. John the Baptist Church (Capitola, California)

=== Delaware ===
- The Episcopal Church of St. John the Baptist, a church in Milton, Sussex County, in the Episcopal Diocese of Delaware
- St. John the Baptist Roman Catholic Church (Newark, Delaware)

=== Hawaii ===
- Saint John the Baptist Catholic Church (Honolulu, Hawaii)

=== Iowa ===
- Church of St. John the Baptist (Burlington, Iowa)
- Saint John the Baptist Catholic Church (Peosta, Iowa)

=== Kansas ===
- St. John the Baptist Catholic Church (Beloit, Kansas)

=== Kentucky ===
- St. John the Baptist Roman Catholic Church (Wilder, Kentucky)

=== Louisiana ===
- St. John the Baptist Catholic Church, in Cloutierville, Louisiana
- St. John the Baptist Church (Dorseyville, Louisiana)

=== Massachusetts ===
- St. John the Baptist Church (New Bedford, Massachusetts)

=== Michigan ===
- St. John the Baptist Catholic Church (Hubbardston, Michigan)
- St. John the Baptist Catholic Church (Menominee, Michigan)

=== New Hampshire ===
- St. John the Baptist Church (Wakefield, New Hampshire)

=== New York ===
- St. John the Baptist Church (Manhattan)
- St. John the Baptist Roman Catholic Church (Plattsburgh, New York)

=== Ohio ===
- St. John's Catholic Church (Canton, Ohio)
- St. John the Baptist Catholic Church (Maria Stein, Ohio)

=== Pennsylvania ===
- St. John the Baptist Church (Pottsville, Pennsylvania)
- St. John the Baptist Church (Pittsburgh, Pennsylvania)

=== Rhode Island ===
- St. John the Baptist Church (Pawtucket, Rhode Island)

=== South Dakota ===
- Lakeport Church (Yankton County, South Dakota)

=== Texas ===
- St. John the Baptist Catholic Church (Ammannsville, Texas)
- St. John the Baptizer Catholic Church (Bridgeport, Texas)

=== Wisconsin ===
- St. John the Baptist Catholic Church (Johnsburg, Wisconsin)

== See also ==
- Saint John the Baptist (disambiguation)
- Basilica of St. John the Baptist (disambiguation)
- St. John the Baptist Cathedral (disambiguation)
- St. John Baptist Church (disambiguation), mainly concerning churches of the Baptist denomination
- St. John's Church (disambiguation)
- Nativity of Saint John the Baptist Church (disambiguation)
