= Church of St. Wenceslaus, Radom =

Gothic church in Radom, Poland

Church of St. Wenceslaus
- Kościół św. Wacława w Radomiu
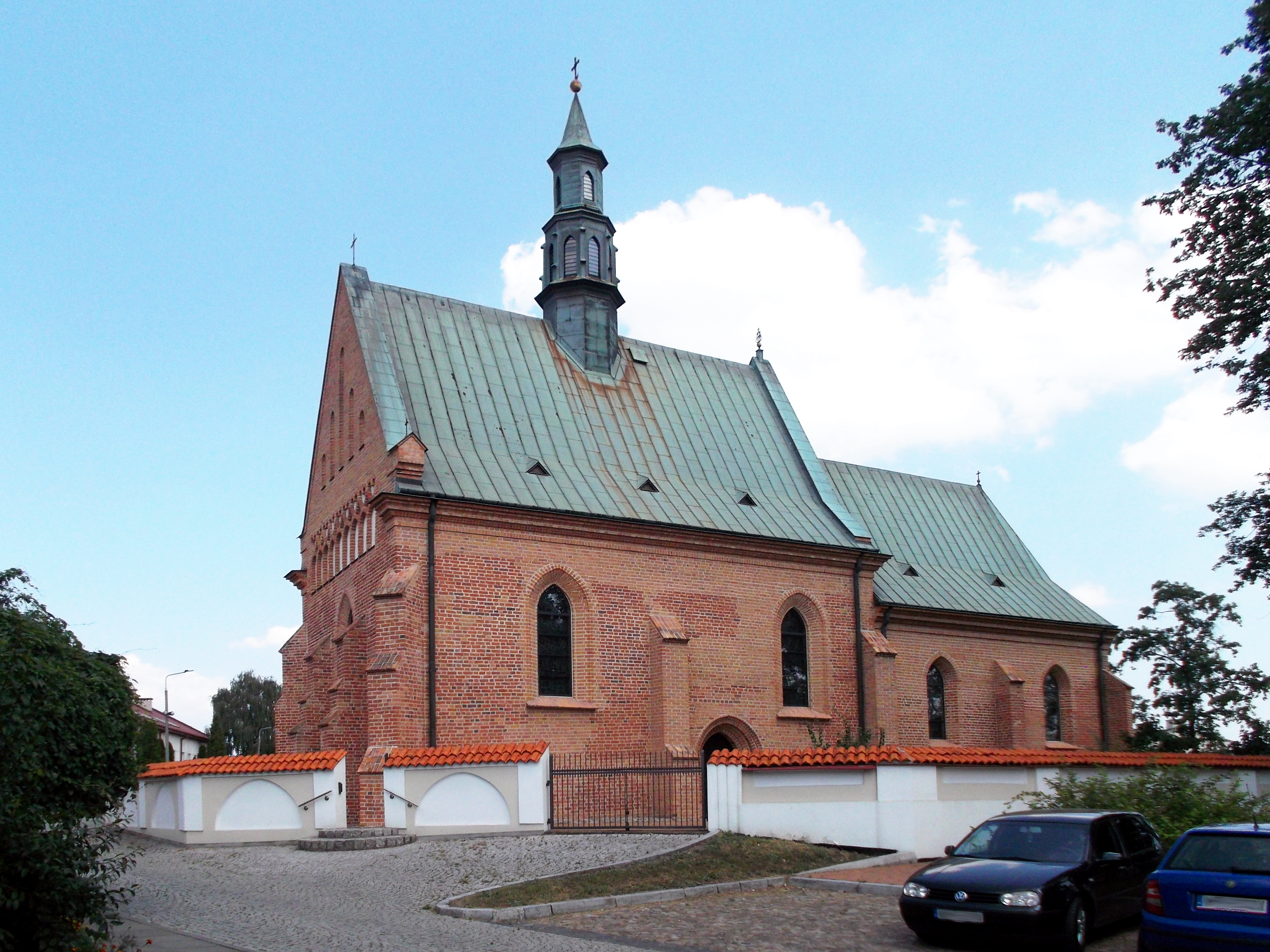
- (Credit: Witia)
- Church of St. Wenceslaus
- 51°24′03″N 21°08′09″E

History
- Founded: 1216

Architecture
- Style: Gothic

The Church of St. Wenceslaus is a Catholic church in Radom, Poland. It is the first parish church in Radom and dates to the early 13th century. It is on the register of monuments in Poland.

== History ==
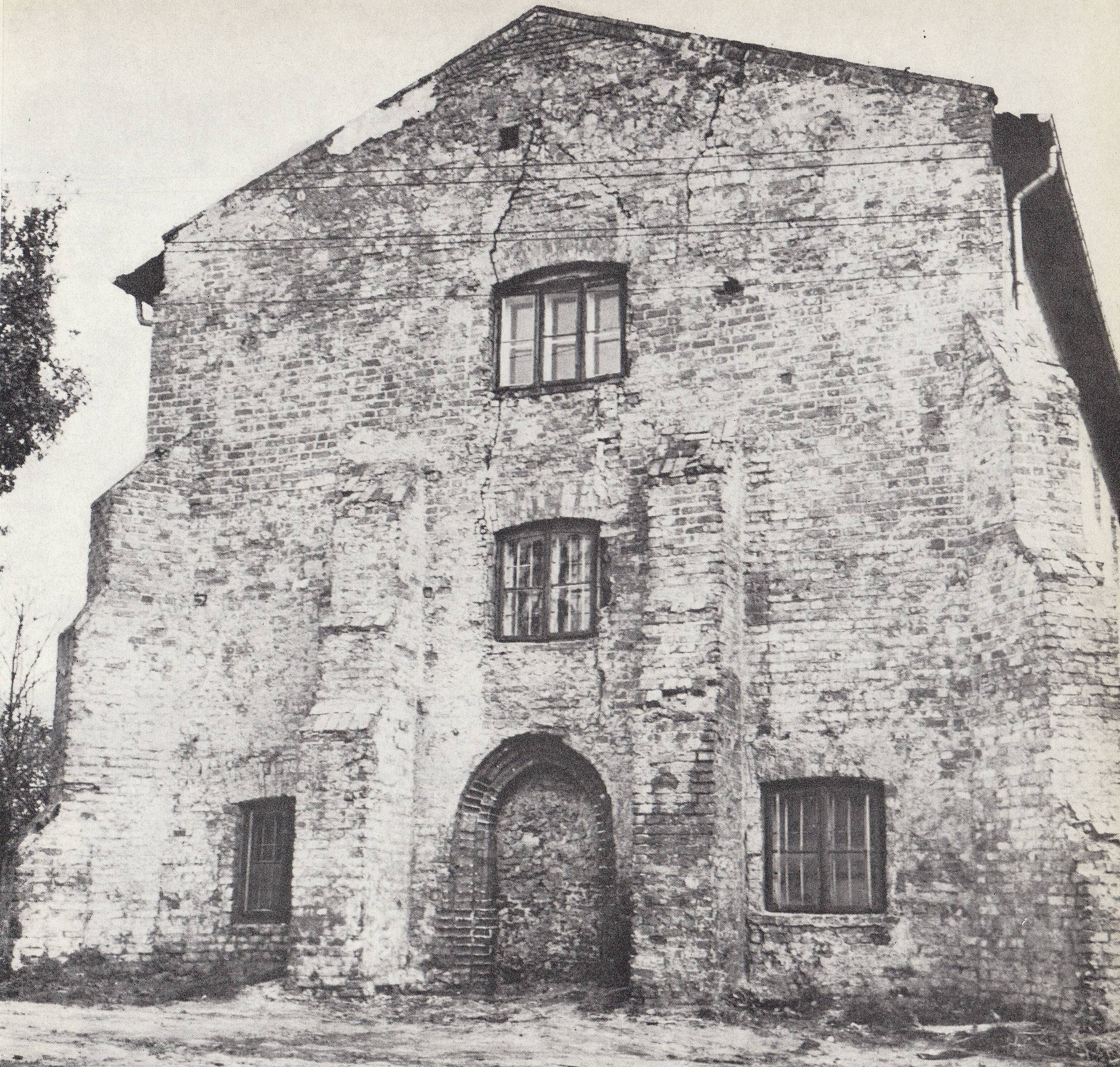
Church before reconstruction

The church was founded in 1216 and is associated with Bolesław V the Chaste. During the Congress Poland period, it was used as a military prison. It was still being used for secular purposes in the 1970s, serving then as a regional museum of archeology.

The church was restored in the 1980s. By 2020, it was also managing a nearby cemetery. In that same year, it received grant money for conservation work.

== See also ==
- Media related to Saint Wenceslaus church in Radom at Wikimedia Commons
- Gothic architecture in modern Poland
- Church of St. John the Baptist, a 14th century church in Radom
