= Basilica of St. John the Baptist (disambiguation) =

The Basilica of St. John the Baptist is a cathedral in St. John's, Newfoundland and Labrador, Canada.

Basilica of St. John the Baptist may also refer to:

- Basilica of St. John the Baptist, Berlin, Germany
- Basilica of St. John the Baptist, Saarbrücken, Germany
- Basilica of San Giovanni Battista, Busto Arsizio, Italy
- Duomo of Monza, Italy
- Badoc Basilica, Philippines
- Taytay Church, Philippines
- Toruń Cathedral (dedicated to Saints John the Baptist and John the Evangelist), Poland
- St. John's Archcathedral, Warsaw, Poland
- Cathedral of San Juan, Puerto Rico, Puerto Rico
- Basilica of St. John the Baptist (Canton, Ohio), United States
- Cathedral Basilica of St. John the Baptist (Savannah, Georgia), United States
- Cathedral of Salto, Uruguay

== See also ==
- Archbasilica of Saint John Lateran, Rome
- St. John the Baptist Church (disambiguation)
- St. John the Baptist Cathedral (disambiguation)
