= Duino Mithraeum =

Coordinates: 45°47′03″N 13°35′52″E

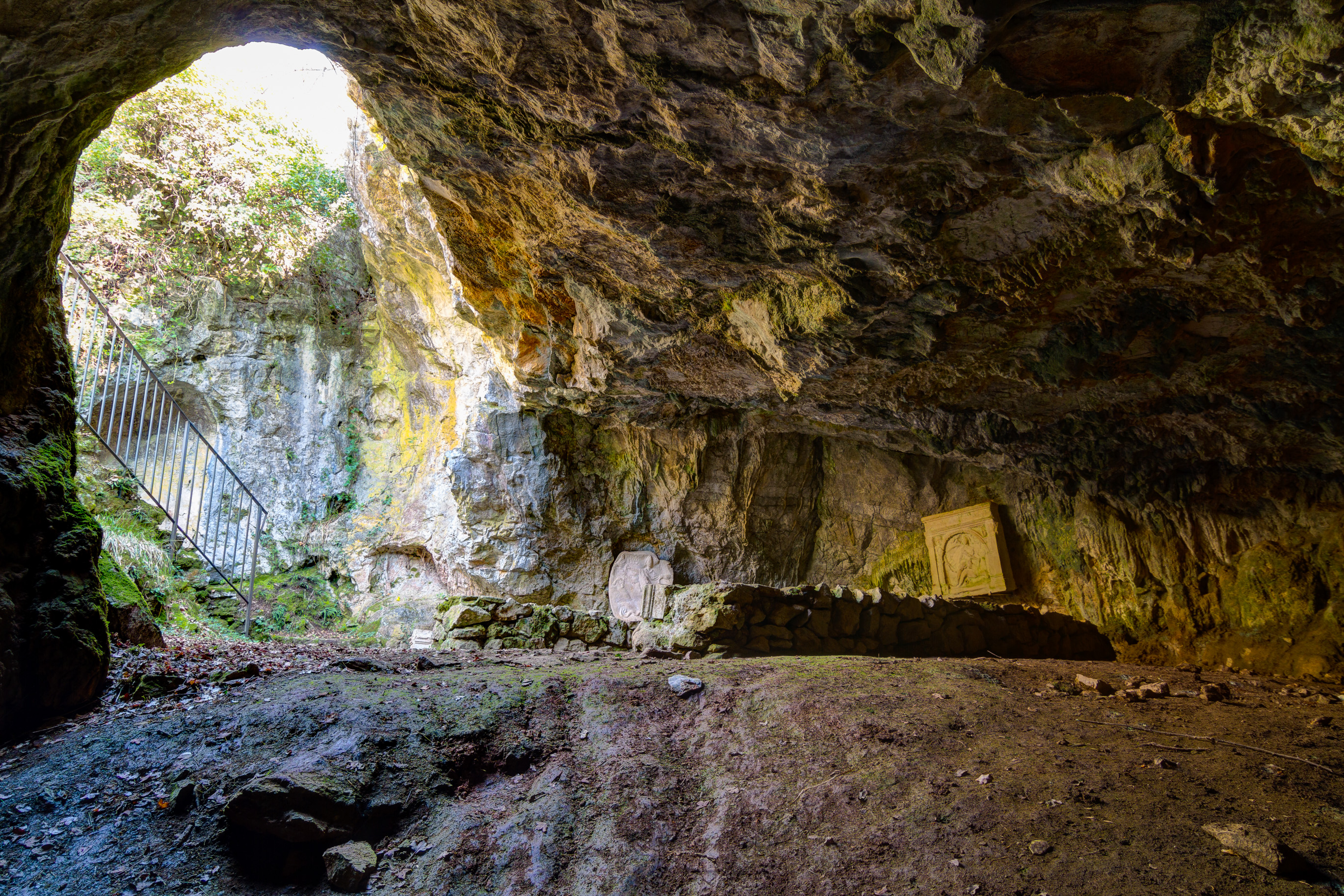
Duino Mithraeum

The Duino Mithraeum is a Mithraeum located near Duino, in the province of Trieste, north-eastern Italy. Mithraea were places of worship for the followers of the Roman mystery religion known as the Mithraic Mysteries. Unlike most other Mithraea, the Duino Mithraeum is a natural cave, with its interior reshaped.

== Overview ==
The Duino cave is located about two kilometers from the sources of Timavo river. At the center of the cave there are two benches and a square block of limestone that served as an altar during religious ceremonies. The lower wall has a plaque on two columns depicting the tauroctony, a standard iconic feature of the Mithraic Mysteries. 400 coins, oil lamps and a large number of jars were found in the cave, as well as small votive altars.

== Gallery ==
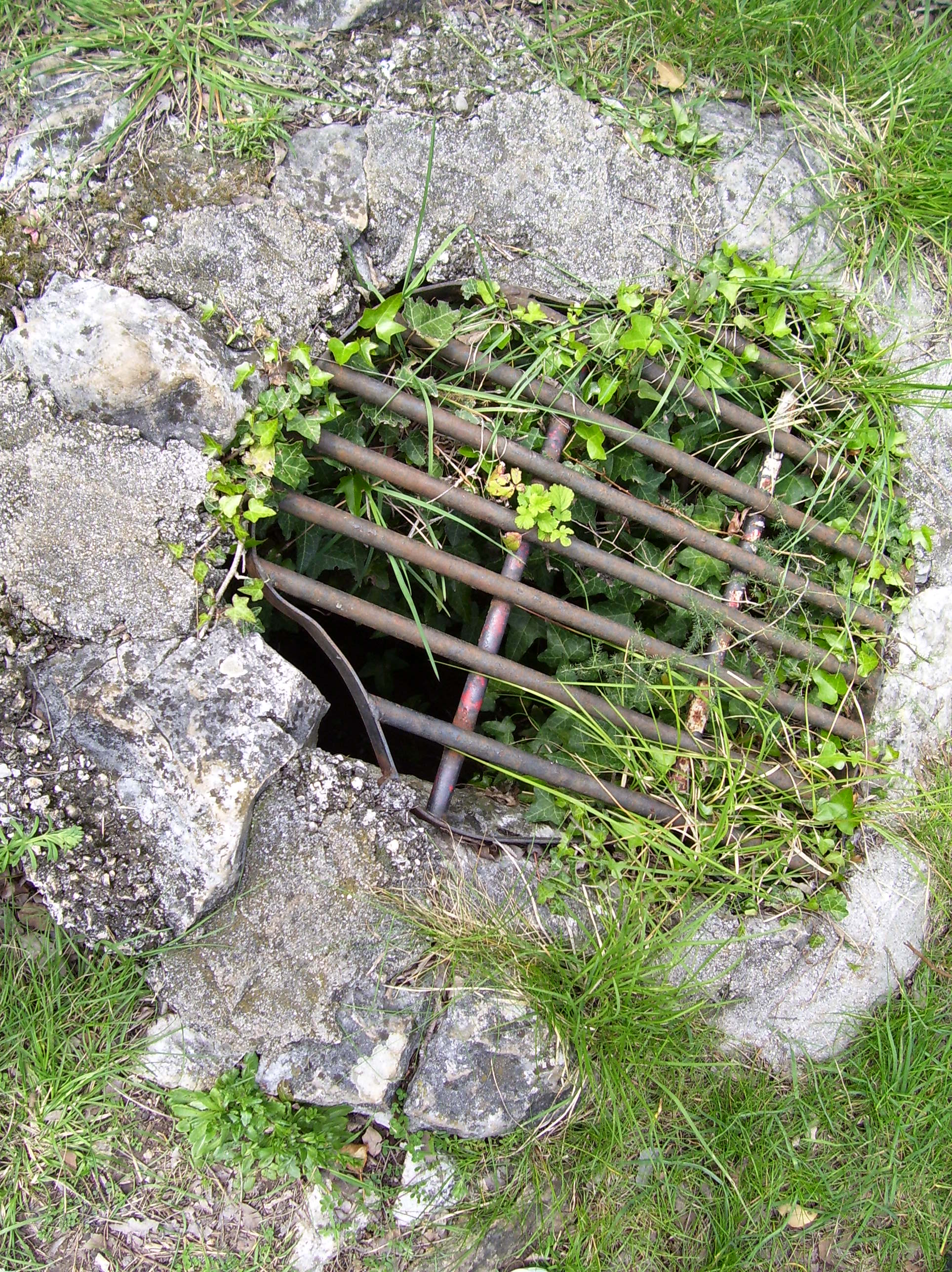
The water well in the Mithraeum.

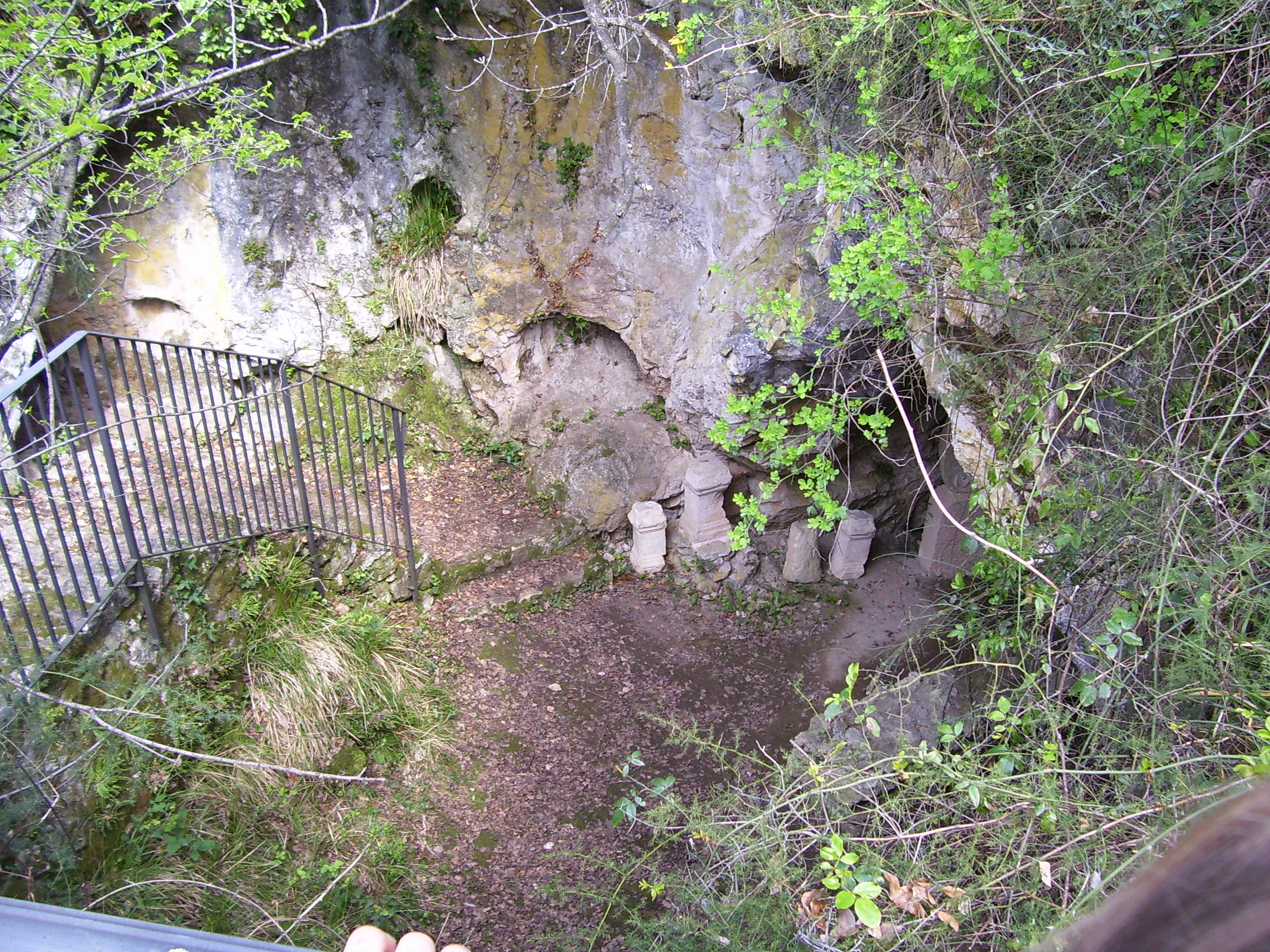
Entrance to the Mithraeum.

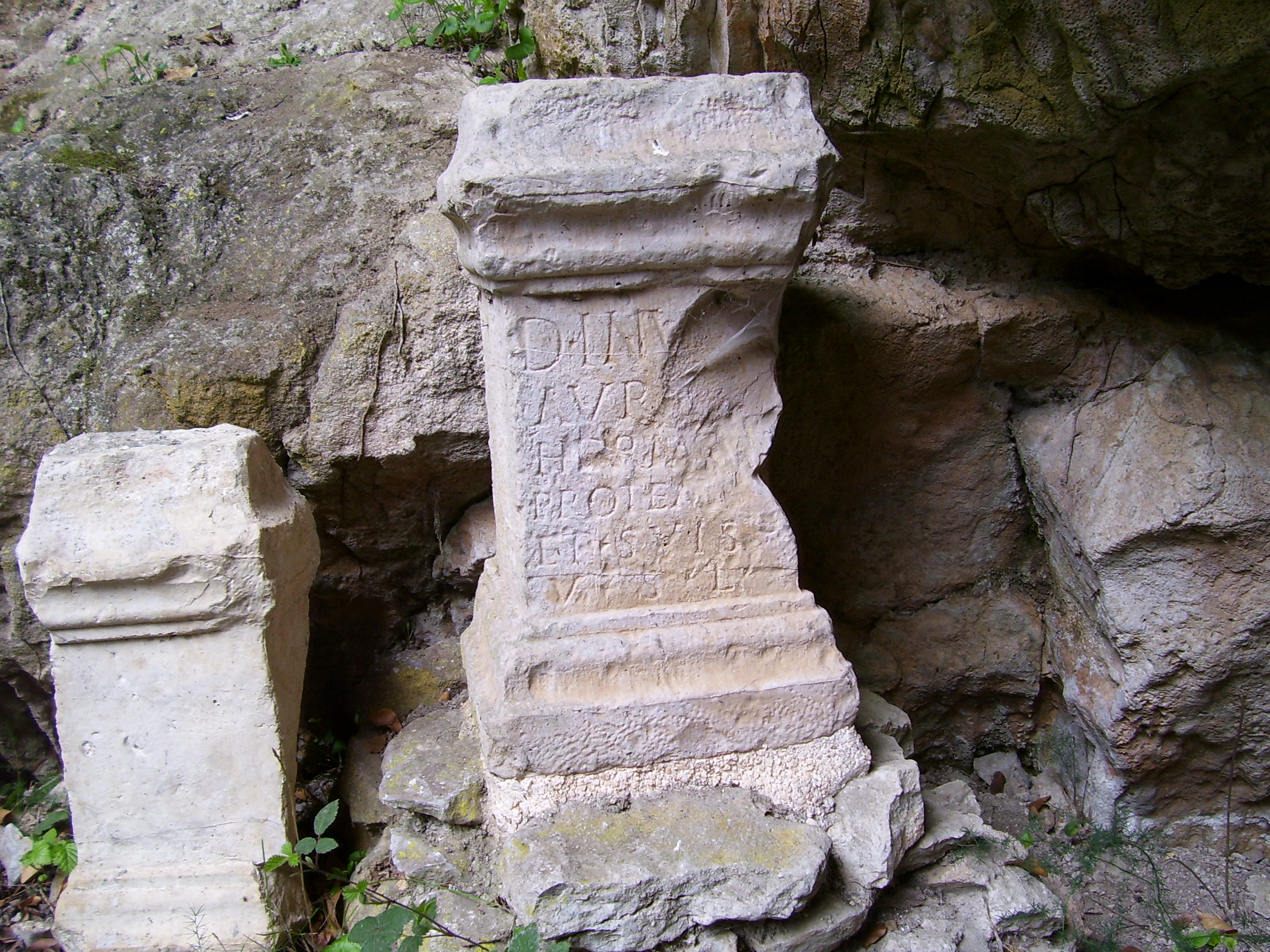
Carved stones at the entrance of the Mithraeum.

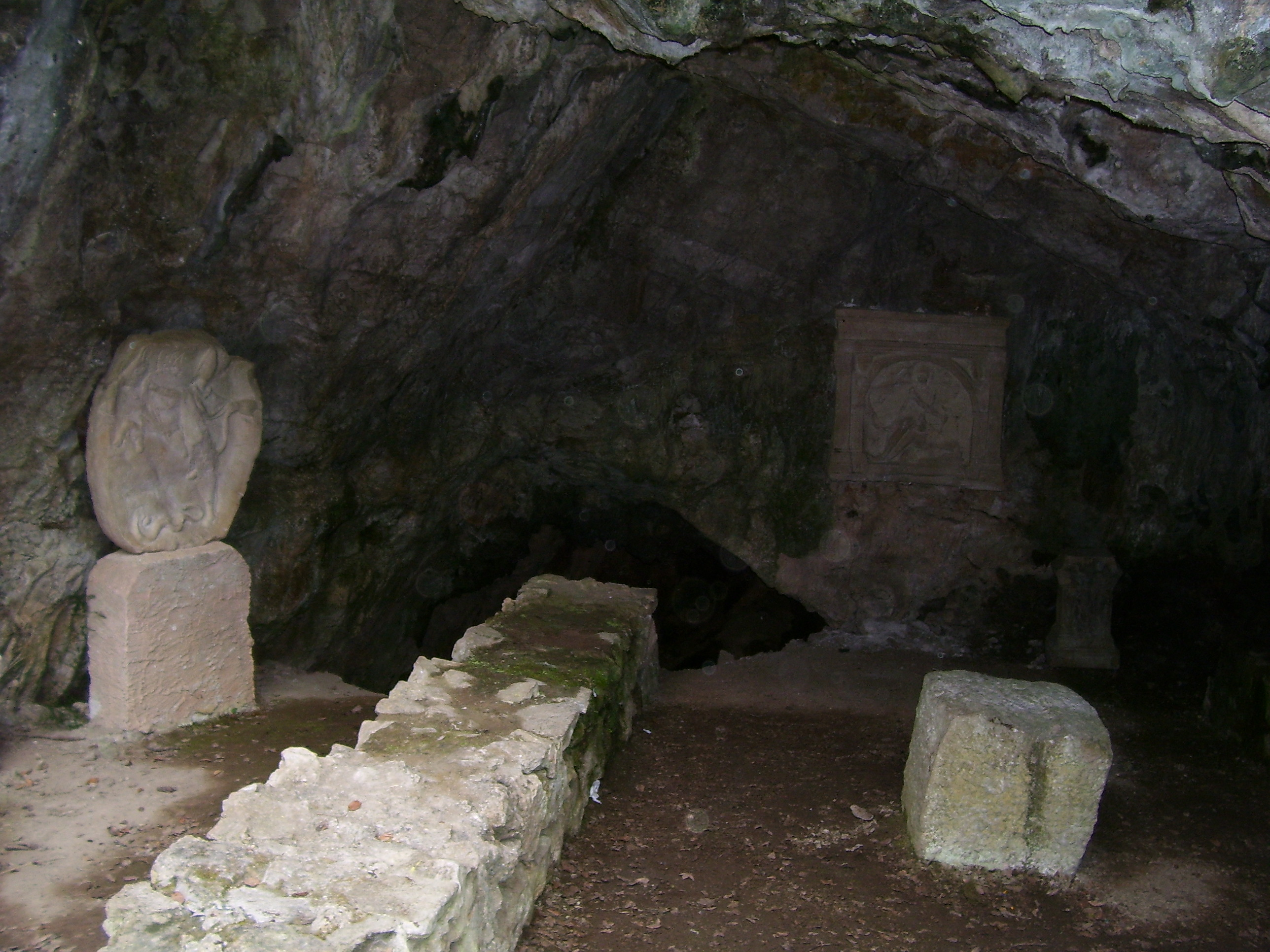
More carved stones at the entrance of the Mithraeum.

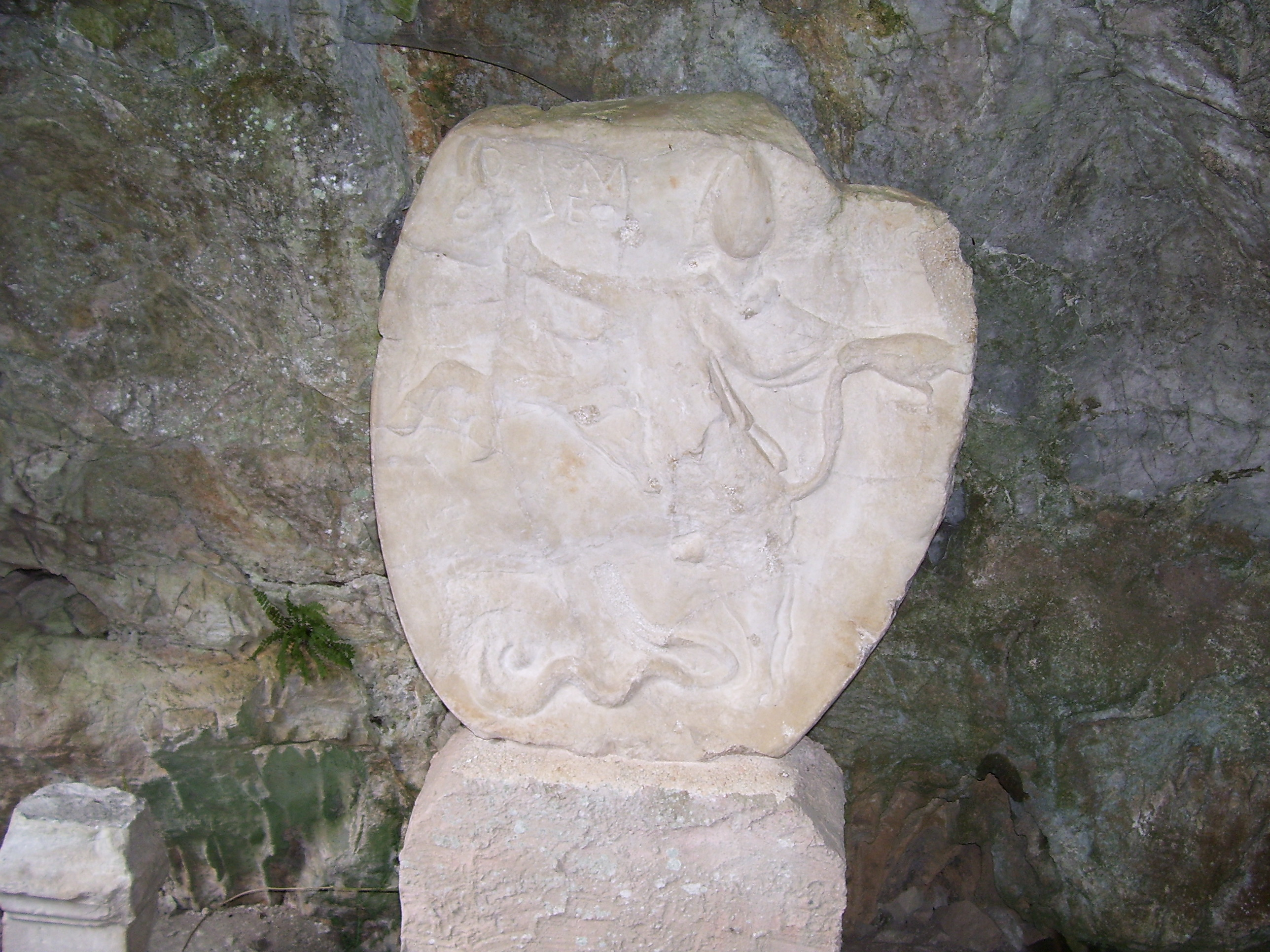
Dedication stone at the Mithraeum.

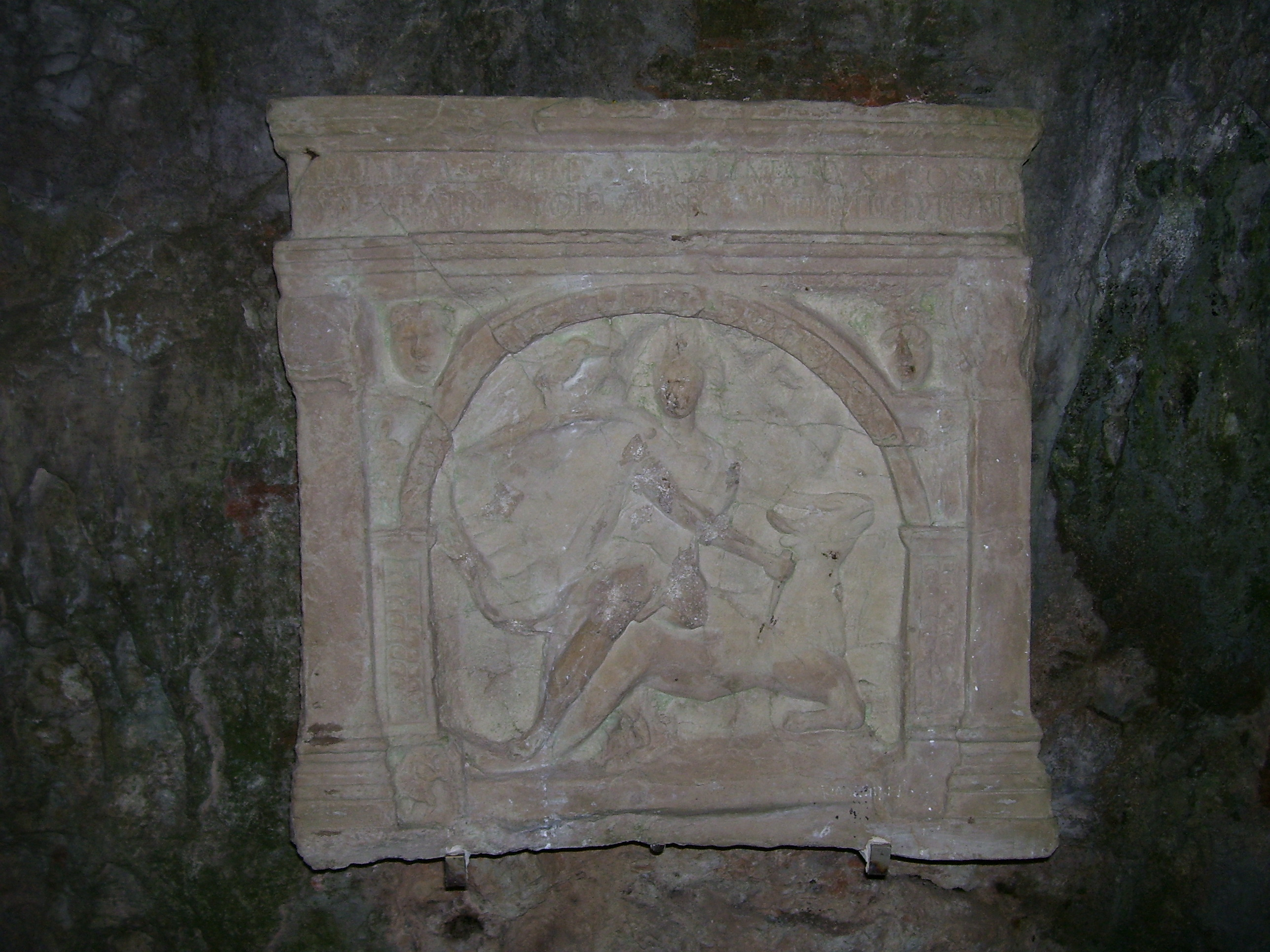
Central dedication stone, depicting the tauroctony.

== See also ==
- San Giovanni in Tuba
