= Saint John the Baptist Church, Acre =

Coordinates: 32.92°N 35.07°E

Church of St John the Baptist
- כנסיית יוחנן המטביל הקדוש
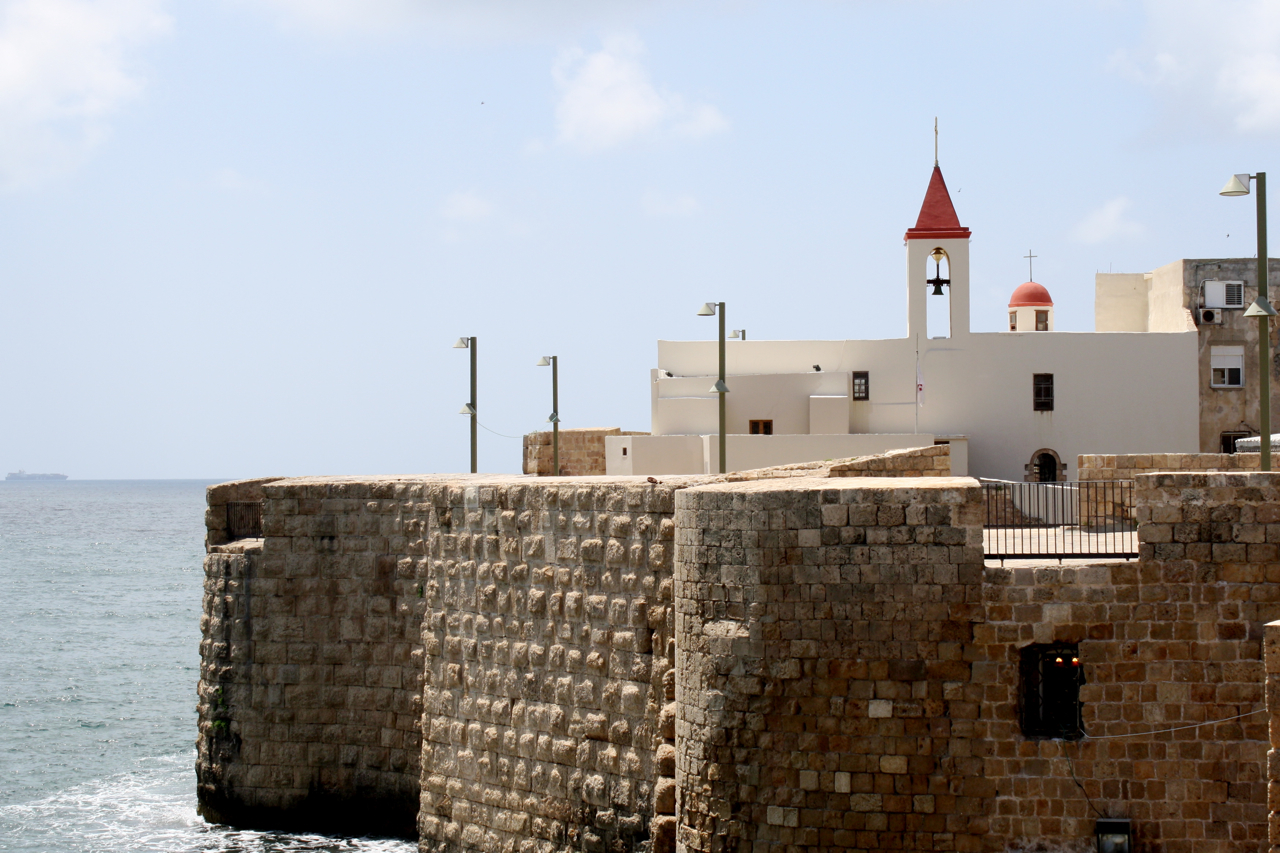
- Church of St John the Baptist in 2011
- Church of St John the Baptist
- Location: Acre
- Country: Israel
- Denomination: Roman Catholic Church

The St. John Baptist Church (Hebrew: כנסיית יוחנן המטביל הקדוש; Arabic: كنيسة القديس يوحنا, Latin: Ecclesia Sancti Ioannis Baptistae) sometimes simply called Church of St. John, is a Catholic church located in the town of Acre in northern Israel.

It should not be confused with the Franciscan ″Terra Sancta Church″ in the same city. It is very close to the coast, near the lighthouse.

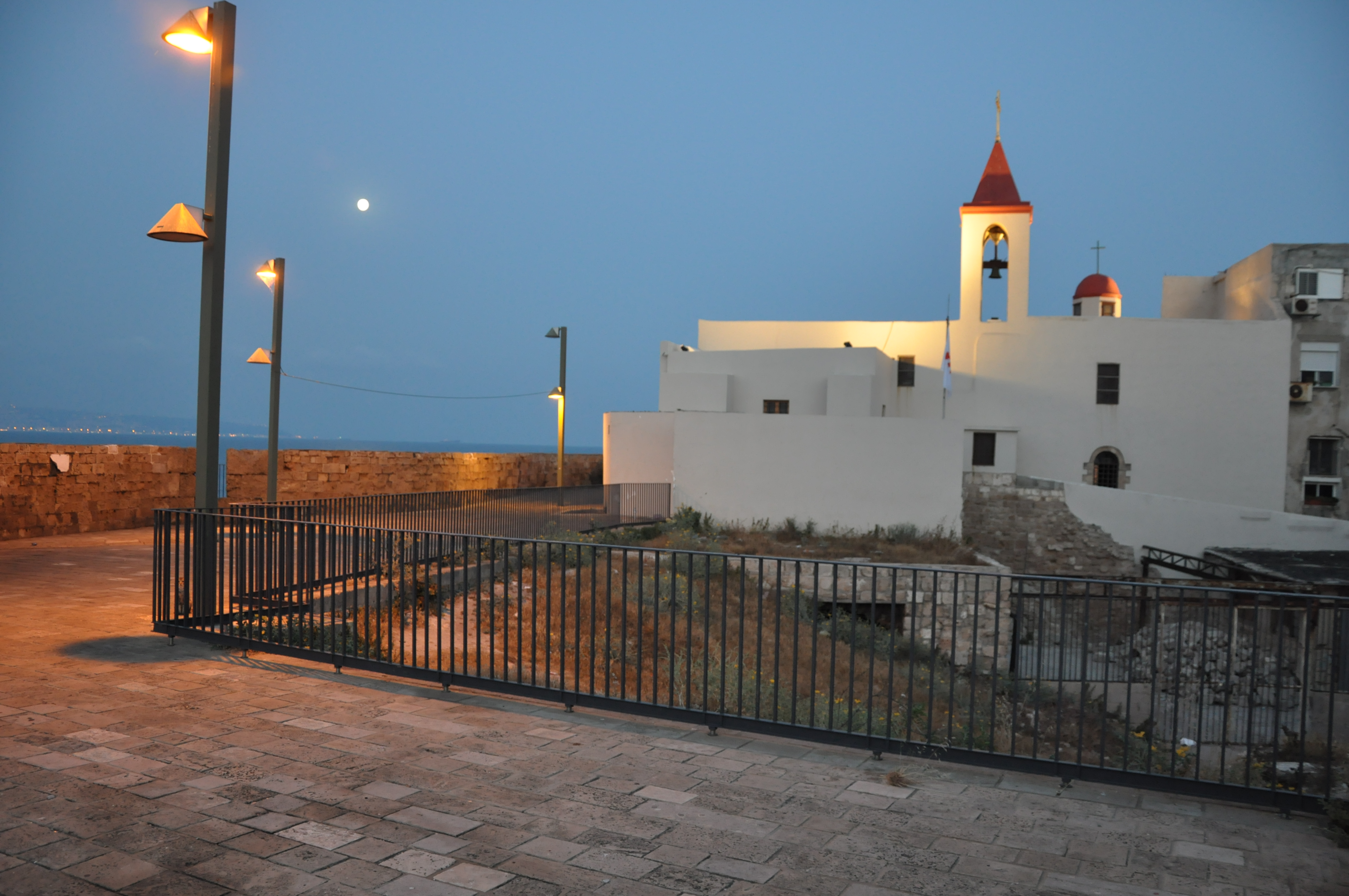
view of the church at sunset

The present church was built by the Franciscans of the Holy Land Custody in 1737, at the site of a former church dedicated to St. Andrew. It works as a parish church for the Catholic community of Latin or Roman rite. It was renovated in 1947.

== See also ==
- Roman Catholicism in Israel
- St. John Baptist Church (disambiguation)
- Terra Sancta Church
