= List of State Register of Heritage Places in the Shire of Irwin =

The State Register of Heritage Places is maintained by the Heritage Council of Western Australia. As of 2026, 158 places are heritage-listed in the Shire of Irwin, of which 16 are on the State Register of Heritage Places.

== List ==
The Western Australian State Register of Heritage Places, as of 2026, lists the following 16 state registered places within the Shire of Irwin:

Place name	Place #	Location	Suburb or town	Co-ordinates	Built	State registered	Notes	Photo
Royal Steam Roller Flour Mill	1210	Waldeck Street, corner Brand Highway	Dongara	29.246264°S 114.932557°E	1894	2 July 1993		
St John the Baptist Anglican Church	1212	15 Waldeck Street	Dongara	29.251159°S 114.930578°E	1884	11 December 1998		
The Grange	1215	Yardarino Road	Yardarino	29.226324°S 115.033349°E	1850	20 December 2002		
Old East End	1217	Brand Highway, 3 km E of townsite	Dongara	29.251703°S 114.958256°E	1868	24 November 2000	Also referred to as Osborn's, Rowland's, Mason's and Ridley's	
Dr Bartlett's Residence (former) & Surrounds	1221	Ocean Drive	Port Denison	29.253846°S 114.927095°E	1860	16 December 2003	Also referred to as Benedictine Retreat, Denison House & Smith's Mill Site	
Irwin Roads Board Office (former) including two Moreton Bay Fig Trees	1227	Point Leander Drive	Dongara	29.251933°S 114.935285°E	1910	12 July 2002	Also referred to as Irwin Roads Board Office, RSL Hall, Well & Moreton Bay Fig Trees	
Russ Cottage	1230	260 Point Leander Drive	Port Denison	29.254767°S 114.934842°E	1867	17 October 2003	Also referred to as Russ Shop (former)	
Dongara Schoolmaster's House (former)	1233	22 Waldeck Street	Dongara	29.250501°S 114.931128°E	1893	1 October 2002	Also referred to as Shire of Irwin Staff Quarters	
Dongara Uniting Church	1234	12 Waldeck Street	Dongara	29.251625°S 114.931216°E	1884	21 January 1997	Also referred to as Dongara Methodist Church	
Dongara Police Station, Courthouse & Gaol (former)	1235	3 Waldeck Street	Dongara	29.252446°S 114.930480°E	1870	16 December 1994	Also referred to as Tourist Centre	
Dongara Post Office & Quarters (former)	1236	7 Waldeck Street	Dongara	29.252222°S 114.930606°E	1894	5 November 1999	Also referred to as Dongara Public Library	
Seventh Day Adventist Church (former)	1240	Corner Brand Highway & Bookara East Road	Bookara	29.048645°S 114.851964°E	1905	16 December 2003		
Two Obelisks and Commemorative Plaques	1242	Location 592 Leander Point	Port Denison	29.277329°S 114.915347°E	1896	24 April 2003	Also referred to as Fishermen's Memorial, Point Leander Obelisk	
Yardarino School (ruin)	1245	Short Street	Yardarino	29.232889°S 115.058257°E	1878	21 January 2005	Also referred to as Irwin School (former)	
Moreton Terrace & Point Leander Drive Fig Trees	4367	Moreton Terrace & Point Leander Drive	Dongara	29.251341°S 114.932924°E	1906	27 February 2004		
Irwin House Group	12245	Location 474 Midlands Road	Milo	29.222072°S 115.107291°E	1850	20 September 2002	Also referred to as Irwin House, Irwin House Farm Building, Grave & Historic	
