= Terra Sancta Church =

Coordinates: 32.9214°N 35.0700°E

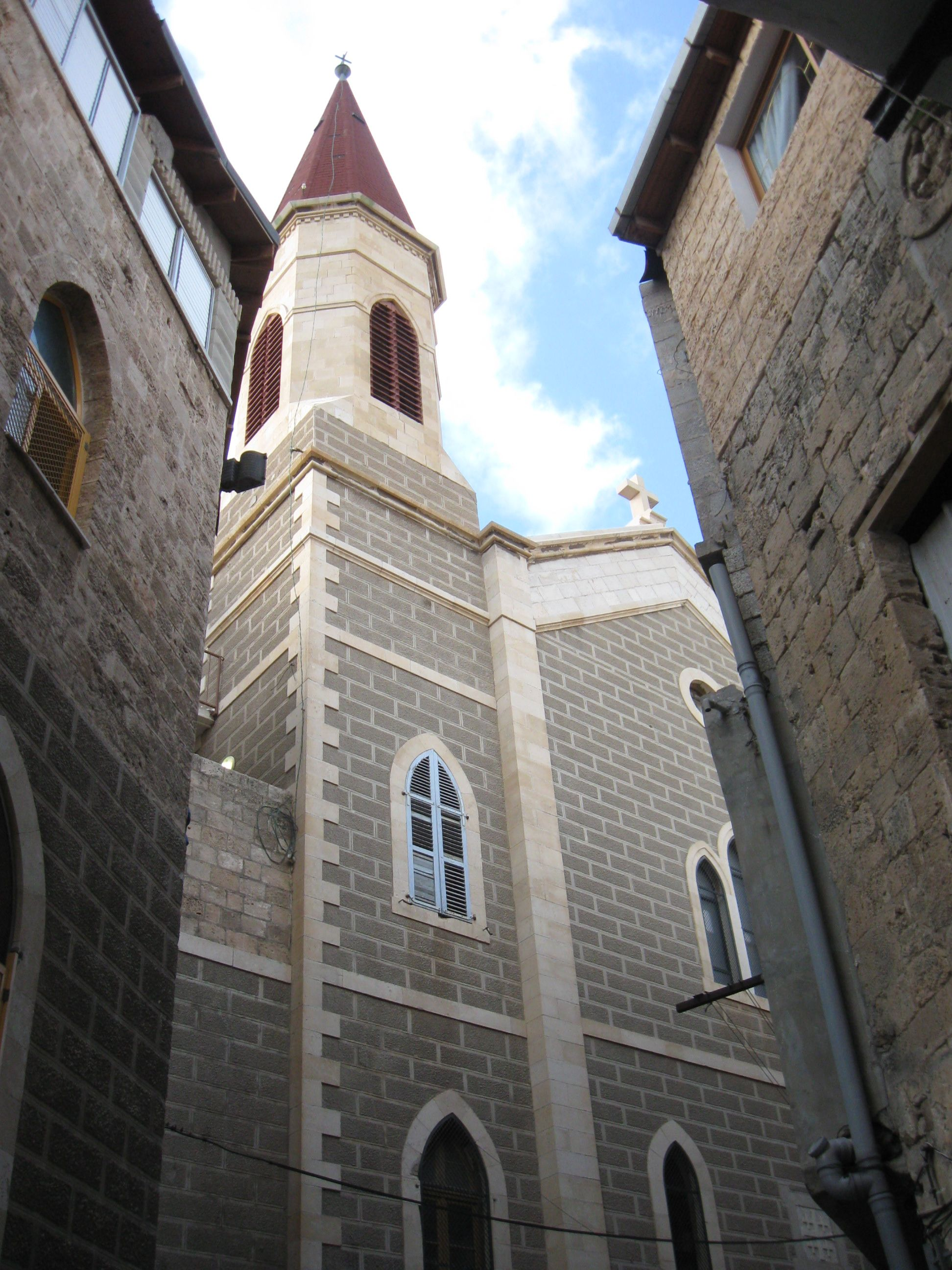
- Terra Sancta Church
- Location: Acre
- Country: Israel
- Denomination: Roman Catholic Church

The Terra Sancta Church (Latin: Ecclesia Terra Sancta which means Holy Land Church), also alternatively Church of St. Francis, is the name given to one of the two Franciscan-run Roman Catholic churches located in the Old City of Acre in northern Israel, the other one being the Church of St. John the Baptist.

== History ==
According to historical documents of Acre, since the thirteenth century the Franciscans gave great importance to the city. They believed that the founder of the Order, St. Francis of Assisi, visited the city between 1219 and 1220. In 1217 the first Franciscan monastery, founded by Father Elias of Cortona was built.

After the 1291 conquest of the city by Muslims, the Franciscans had to leave Acre only to return in 1620. The Terra Sancta Church was established in 1673.

== Location and description ==
The Terra Sancta Church was established in 1673. It is located in the centre of Acre's Old City, north of the caravansary known as Khan el-Faranj.

The church is recognisable by the red spire of its Gothic tower, whose colour distinguishes it from other towers and minarets.

== See also ==
- Roman Catholicism in Israel
- St. John Baptist Church, Acre
