= St John the Baptist Anglican Church, Dongara =

St John the Baptist Anglican Church
- St John the Baptist Anglican Church, Dongara
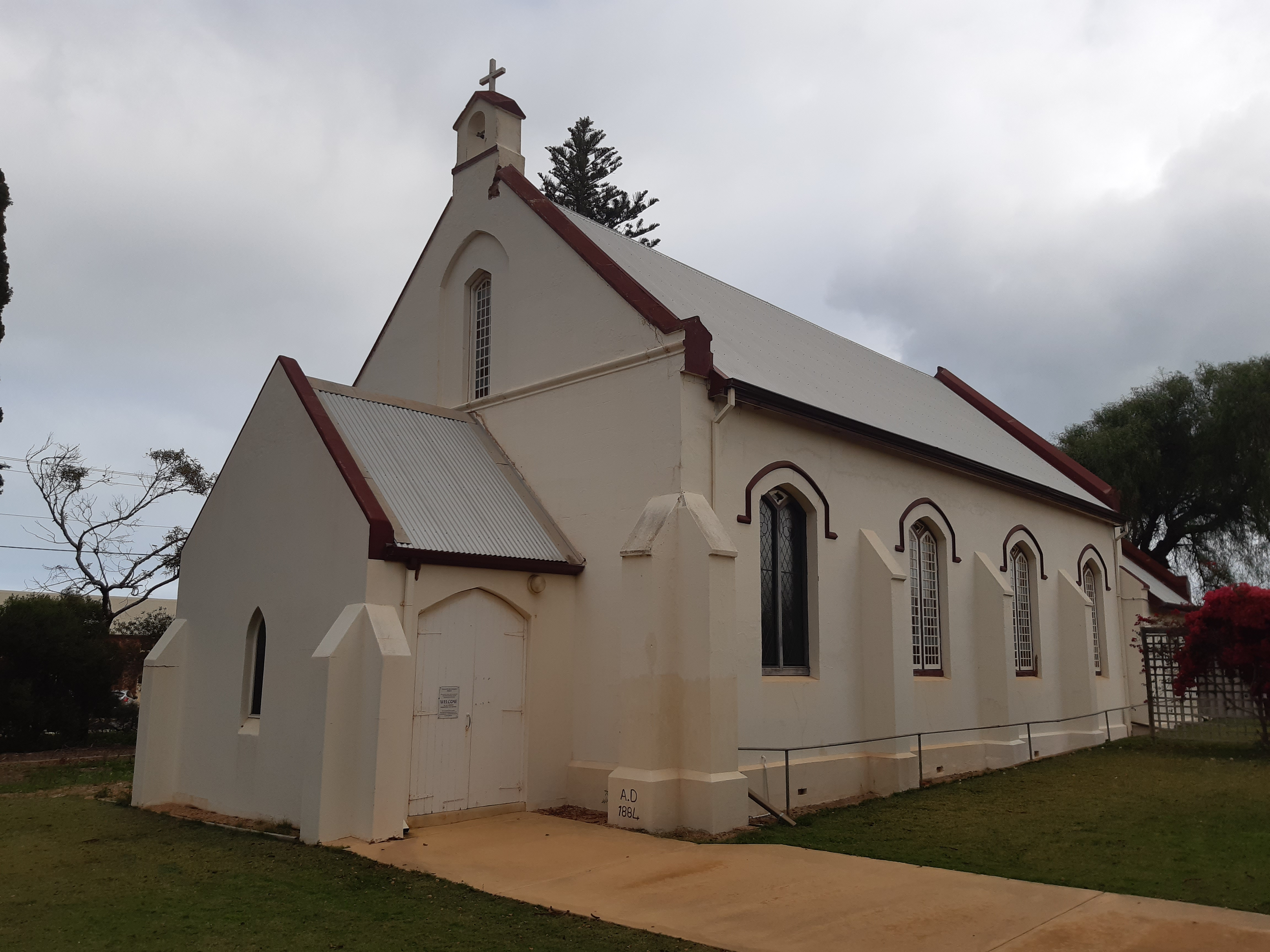
- St John the Baptist Anglican Church
- 29°15′04″S 114°55′50″E
- Location: Dongara, Western Australia
- Address: 15 Waldeck Street, Dongara WA 6525
- Country: Australia
- Denomination: Anglican Church of Australia
- Churchmanship: Low church, Evangelical
- Website: Dongara Church

History
- Status: Church
- Founded: 1885
- Dedication: John the Baptist
- Consecrated: 28 June 1885

Architecture
- Functional status: Active
- Heritage designation: State Register of Heritage Places
- Designated: 11 December 1998
- Architect: Francis Bird
- Architectural type: Parish church
- Style: Victorian Gothic
- Completed: 1885

Specifications
- Materials: Limestone

Administration
- Province: Western Australia
- Diocese: North West Australia
- Parish: Dongara with Mingenew

Clergy
- Rector: Rev David Thompson

Western Australia Heritage Register
- Official name: St John the Baptist Anglican Church
- Type: State Registered Place
- Criteria: 11.1., 11.2., 11.4., 12.1., 12.2., 12.3, 12.4., 12.5.
- Designated: 11 December 1998
- Reference no.: 01212

St John the Baptist Anglican Church is a heritage-listed Anglican church located in Dongara, Western Australia. Constructed in 1885, the church remains in active use and is part of the Anglican Diocese of North West Australia.

== Description ==
Designed by colonial architect Francis Bird, St John the Baptist Anglican Church exemplifies the Victorian Gothic style characteristic of a rural parish of that era. The building, constructed by William Henry Linthorne, used local limestone rubble which was then rendered.

The land for the church was granted in 1873, but fundraising efforts delayed construction until 1884–85, with the total cost reaching £600, equivalent to A$102,925 in 2022. Once funds where achieved, the church was designed in 1884 and completed in 1885.

The church features a free-standing timber portal that originally served as a fire alarm and curfew bell from Gaol Hill, Fremantle, a site known for the Round House, Western Australia's second oldest surviving European building, after the Wiebbe Hayes Stone Fort on West Wallabi Island. Inside, the church includes stained glass windows, jarrah flooring, and pews crafted from local driftwood timber.

Notably, St John the Baptist Church is the only surviving ecclesiastical work by Francis Bird. It is also distinguished by its unusual orientation: the sanctuary is located to the west of the nave, rather than the traditional eastern placement. This orientation, which is "extremely rare in church architecture," was chosen to protect parishioners from the potentially damaging sea breeze from the west.

In 1949, the church's baptismal register recorded over 700 names, reflecting its historical and ongoing significance to the local community.

== See also ==
- Anglican Diocese of North West Australia
- List of Anglican churches in Western Australia
- List of State Register of Heritage Places in the Shire of Irwin
