= St. John Baptist Church =

St. John Baptist Church may refer to:

- St. John Baptist Church (Mason City, Iowa), listed on the NRHP in Iowa
- St. John Baptist Church (Lecompte, Louisiana), listed on the NRHP in Louisiana
- St. John the Baptist Church (Dorseyville, Louisiana), listed on the NRHP in Louisiana
- Community of St John Baptist, Mendham, New Jersey, listed on the NRHP in New Jersey

== See also ==
- Saint John the Baptist Church (disambiguation) – mainly concerning churches named after John the Baptist
