= St. John the Baptist Church, Caransebeș =

Heritage site in Caraș-Severin County, Romania

Coordinates: 45°24′35″N 22°13′38″E

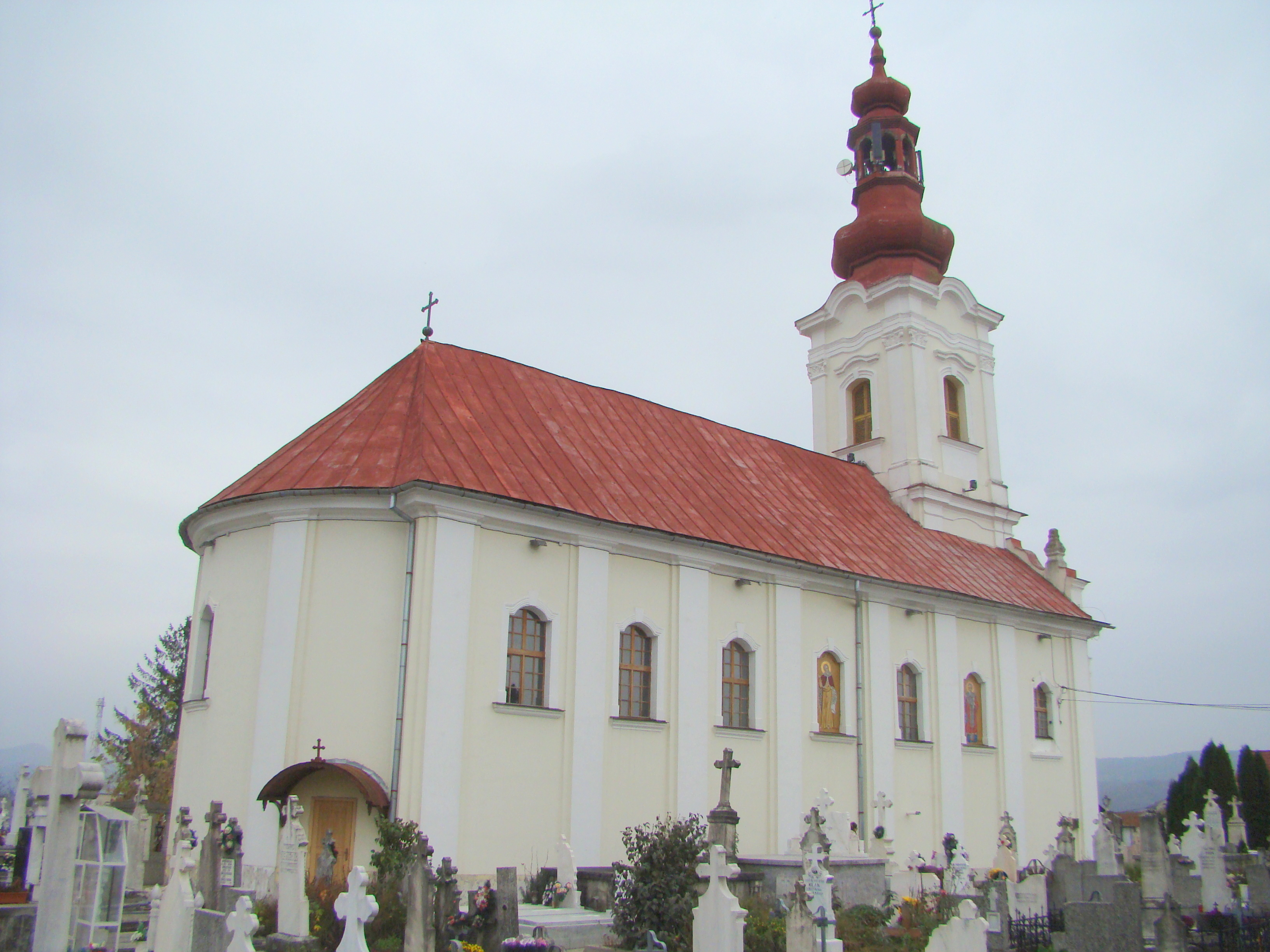
St. John the Baptist Church

St. John the Baptist Church (Romanian: Biserica Sfântul Ioan Botezătorul) is a Romanian Orthodox church located at 40 Muntele Mic Street, Caransebeș, Romania. It is dedicated to John the Baptist.

The church was built in Viennese Baroque style between 1770 and 1780. It is situated in the old city cemetery, surrounded by a stone wall where the defensive walls of the citadel once stood. The cemetery used to include a wooden church; a large cross marks its altar, and a slight elevation indicates where the entrance once stood.

According to an inscription in the interior, the new church was consecrated in May 1781. Two painters and an apprentice, all named Ion, painted the inside walls in Neo-Byzantine style in 1787. The floors are of stone and mosaic. The church acquired three bells, cast at Temeschwar (1790 and 1791) and Graz (1796).

During the Austro-Turkish War of 1788–1791, Ottoman troops camped out inside the church, seriously damaging the painting and altar. A local merchant and his wife financed the subsequent repairs, which were finished in 1808, as the inscription mentions. The spire was coated in copper in 1855, and a new tin roof installed. Thorough exterior renovation took place in 1927, while the frescoes were freshened in 1960. Additional ample repairs, inside and out, were carrcarried out in 2006–2008.

A number of important local figures lie buried in the cemetery, including Ioan Popasu, Nicolae Popea, Emilian Birdaș, Patriciu Dragalina, Iuliu Vuia, Pavel Jumanca and Traian Doda. The church is listed as a historic monument by Romania's Ministry of Culture and Religious Affairs.
