= San Giovanni in Tuba =

Church in Trieste province, Italy

Coordinates: 45°47′18.2″N 13°35′25.2″E

San Giovanni in Tuba (Slovene: Cerkev sv. Janeza Krstnika) is a church in San Giovanni di Duino (Slovene: Štivan), a hamlet which forms part of the comune of Duino-Aurisina (Slovene: Devin - Nabrežina) in the Province of Trieste, north-east Italy. It is located at the resurgence of the Timavo and is notable for the remains of a palaeo-Christian basilica.

There are remains indicating that in the beginning it was a pagan temple dedicated to god Diomedes, Temavus, Hercules and Saturn. In 568 with the arrival of the Lombards in 610, or with the invasion of the Avars, the relics that had been laid under the altar were hidden in another place. The invasion of the Hungarians completely destroyed the Benedictine Monastery.

In 1112 the patriarch Vodolrico ordered the reconstruction work of the church. In mid-1400 the lords of Walsee, feudal lords of the Timavo and its port, added a Gothic apse. Further damage to the structure of the church were caused in the 15th and 16th centuries by the Turks, and a restoration was undertaken in 1519 by Giovanni Hoffer, Captain of Duino in 1642, when the bell tower was built in Venetian style.

The church of San Giovanni in Tuba was heavily damaged in 1917 during the World War I. The frescoes were almost all lost. What was saved is the floor of the ancient Christian basilica, a polychrome mosaic with geometric motifs including Solomon’s knots, and floral designs.

Today, mass is not celebrated in the Church.

== Gallery ==
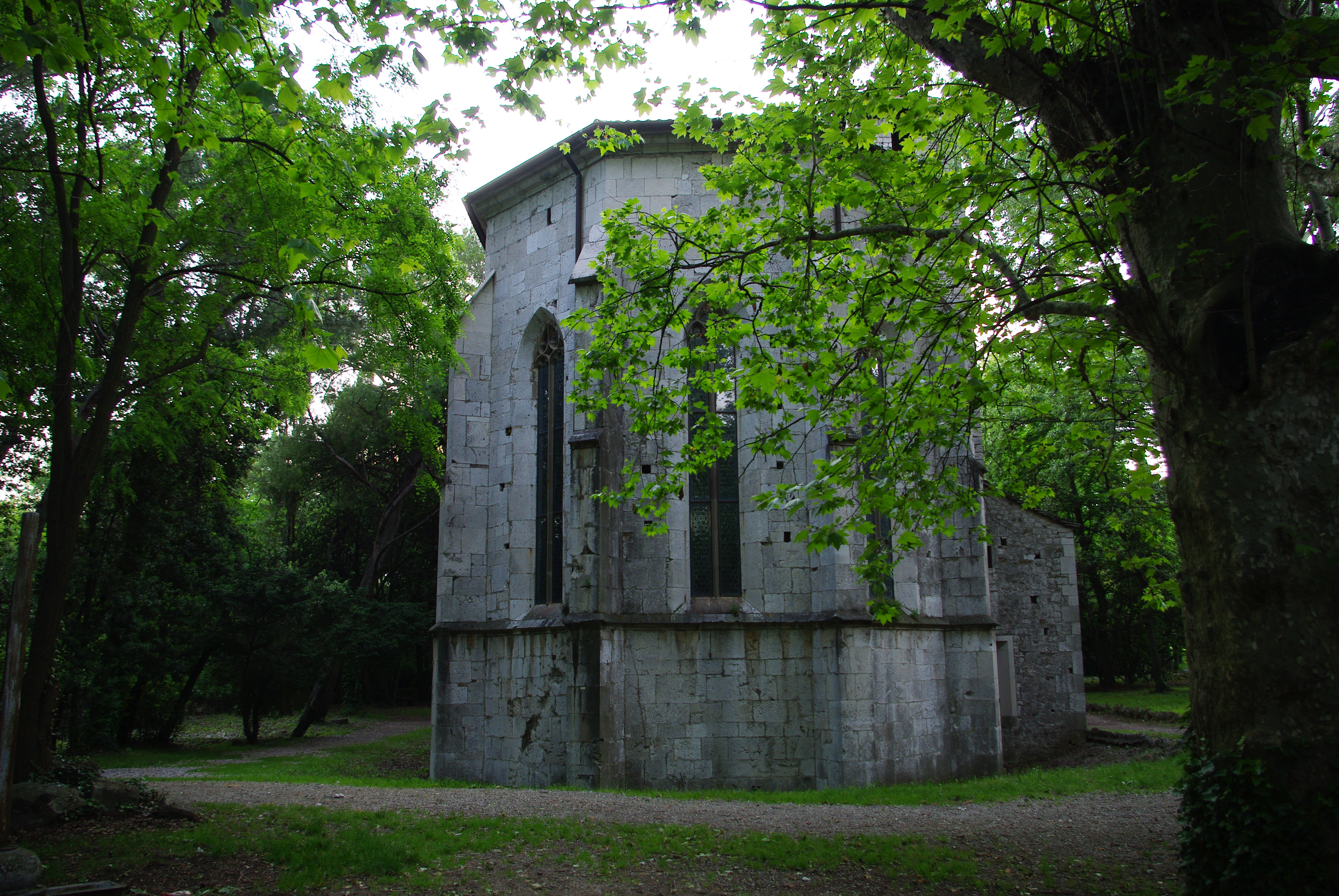
Church San Giovanni in Tuba

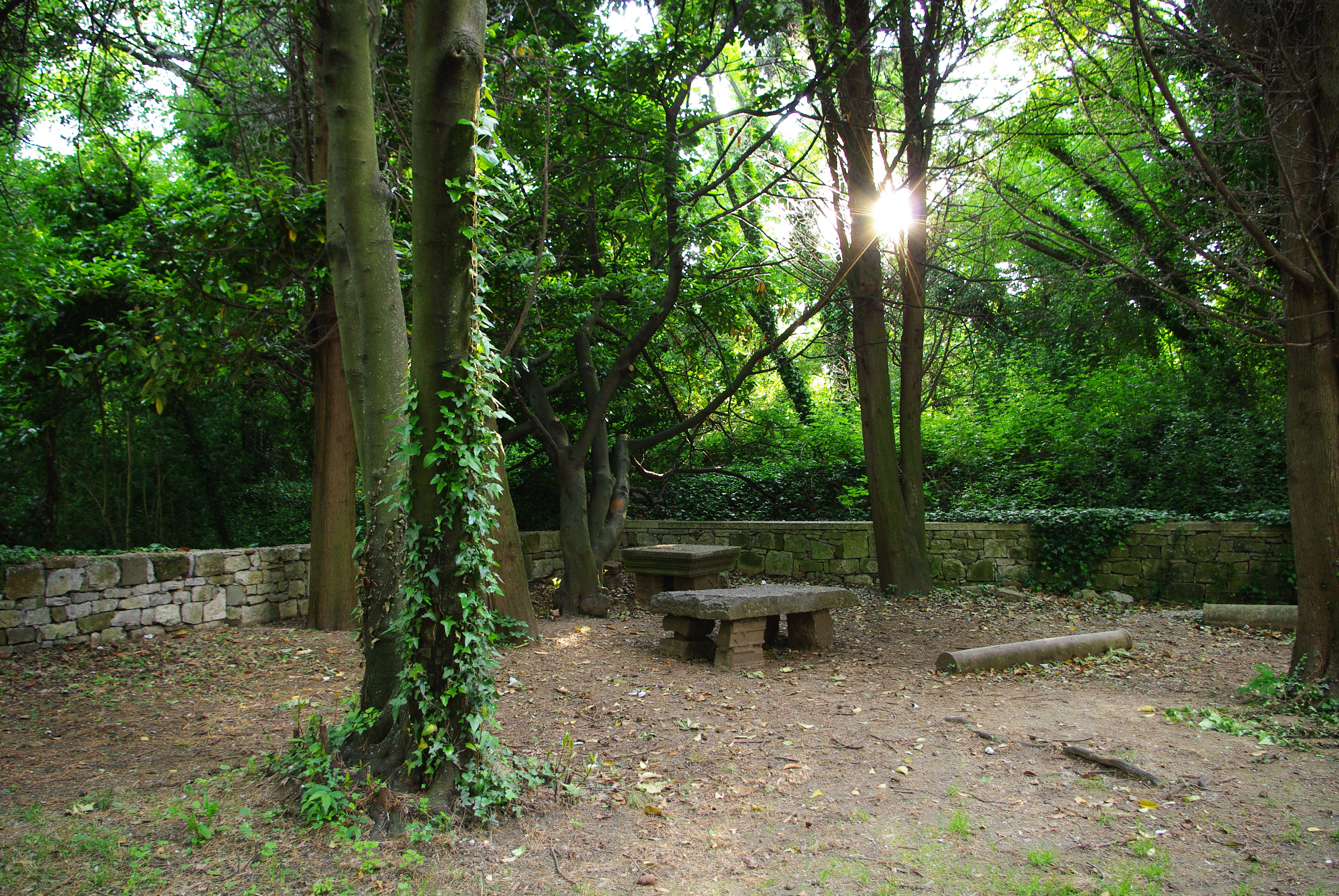
Outside of the church San Giovanni in Tuba

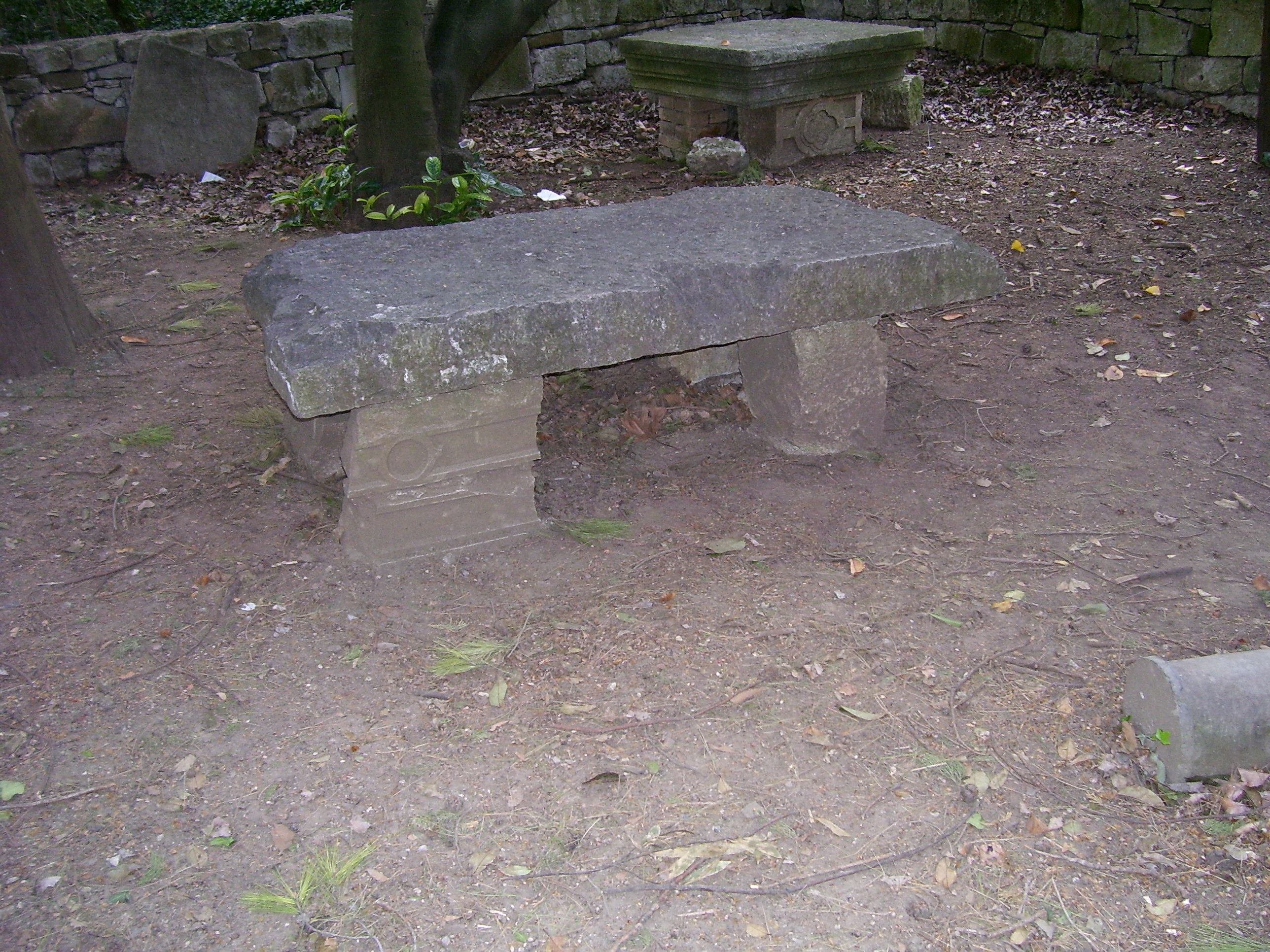
Outside of the church

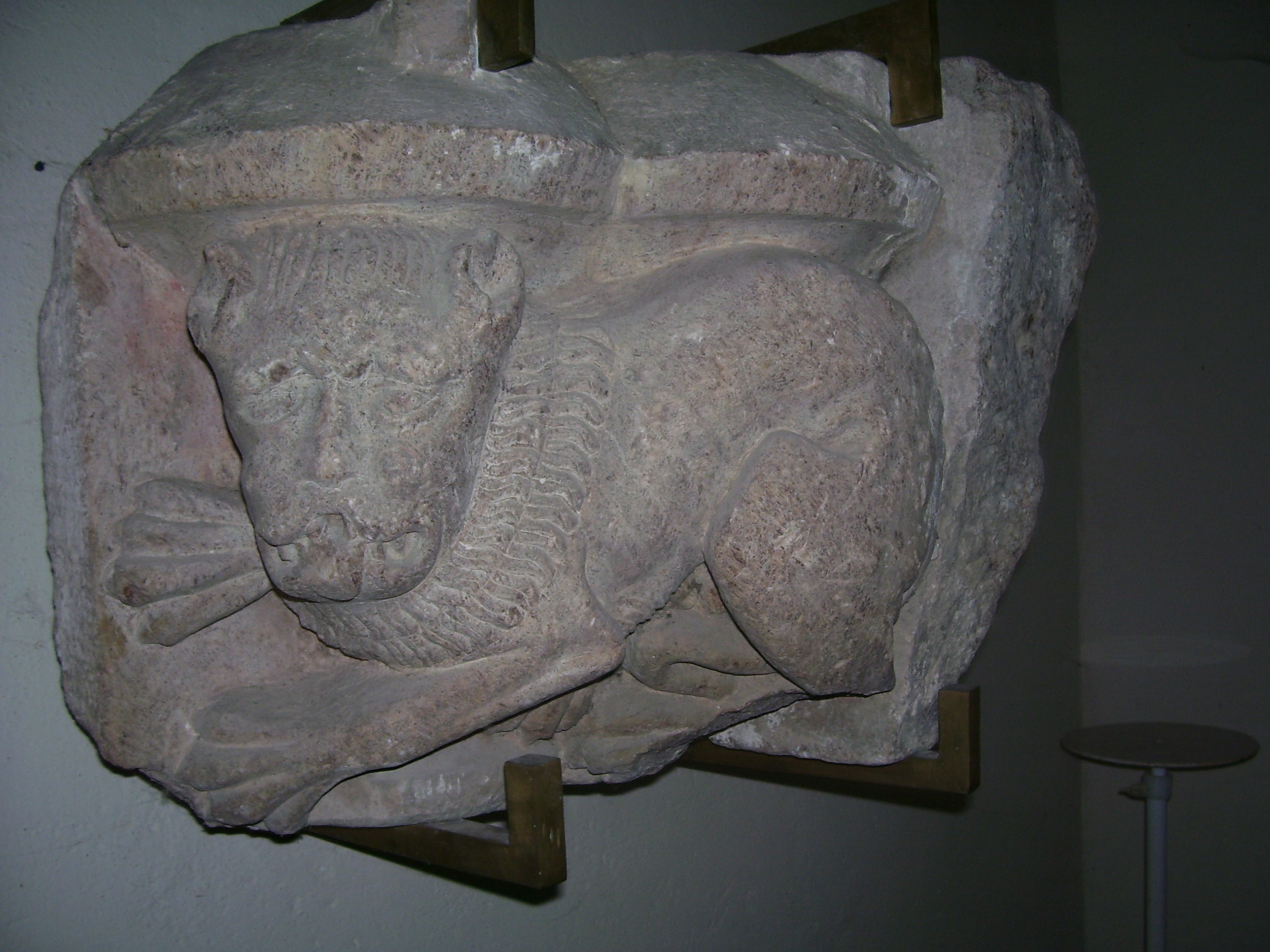
Carved stone inside of the church

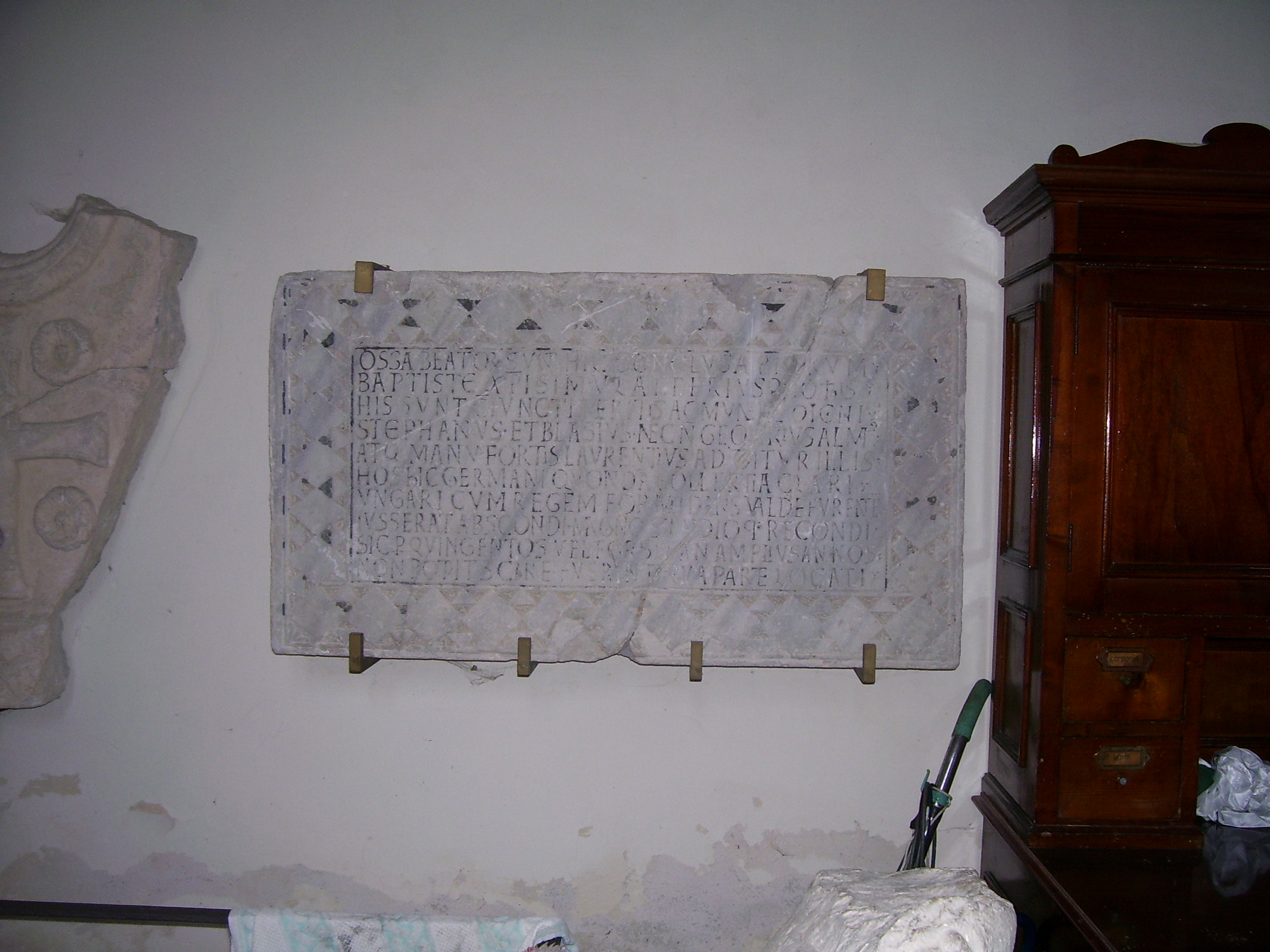
Carved inscription in the church of San Giovanni in Tuba

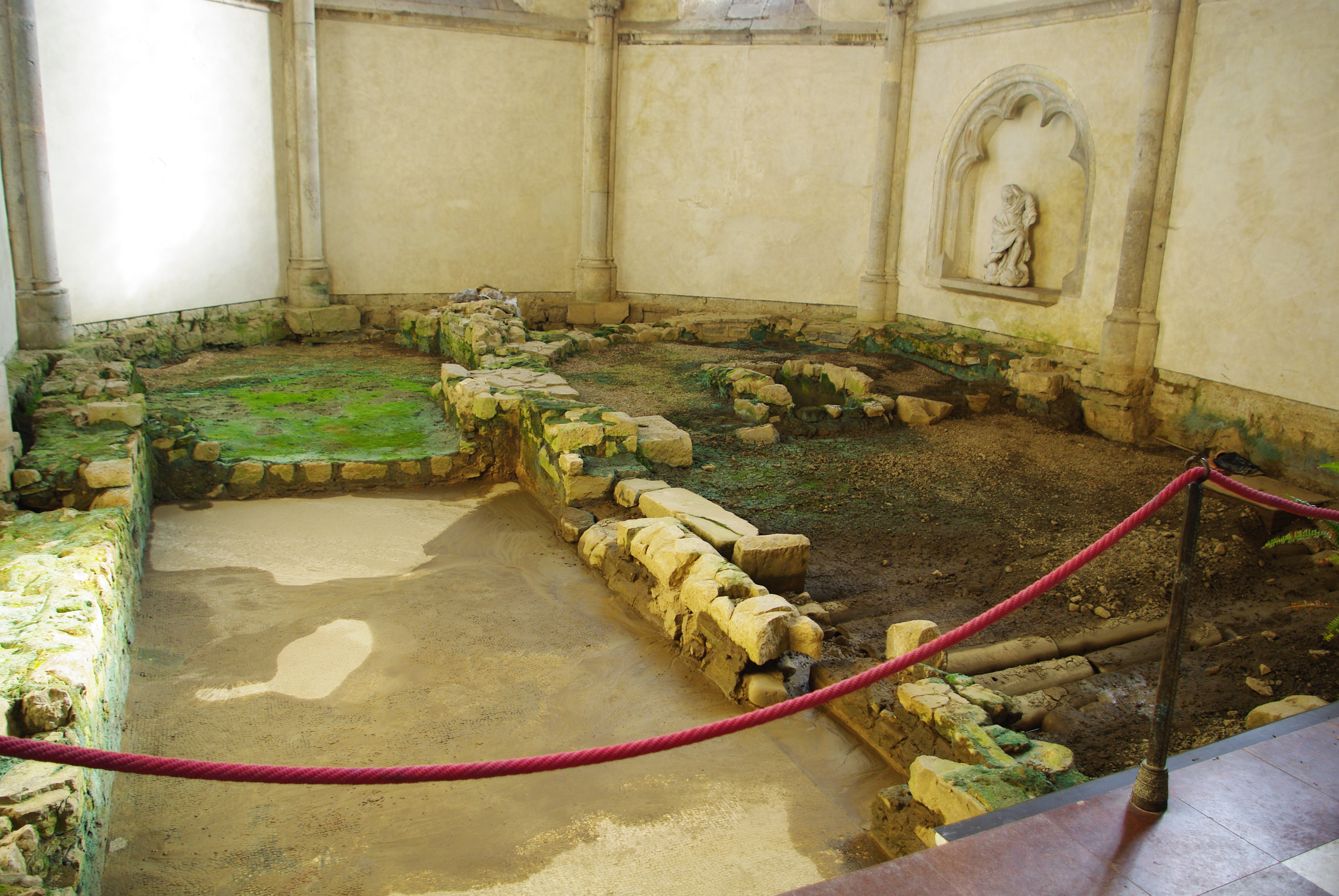
Inside the church

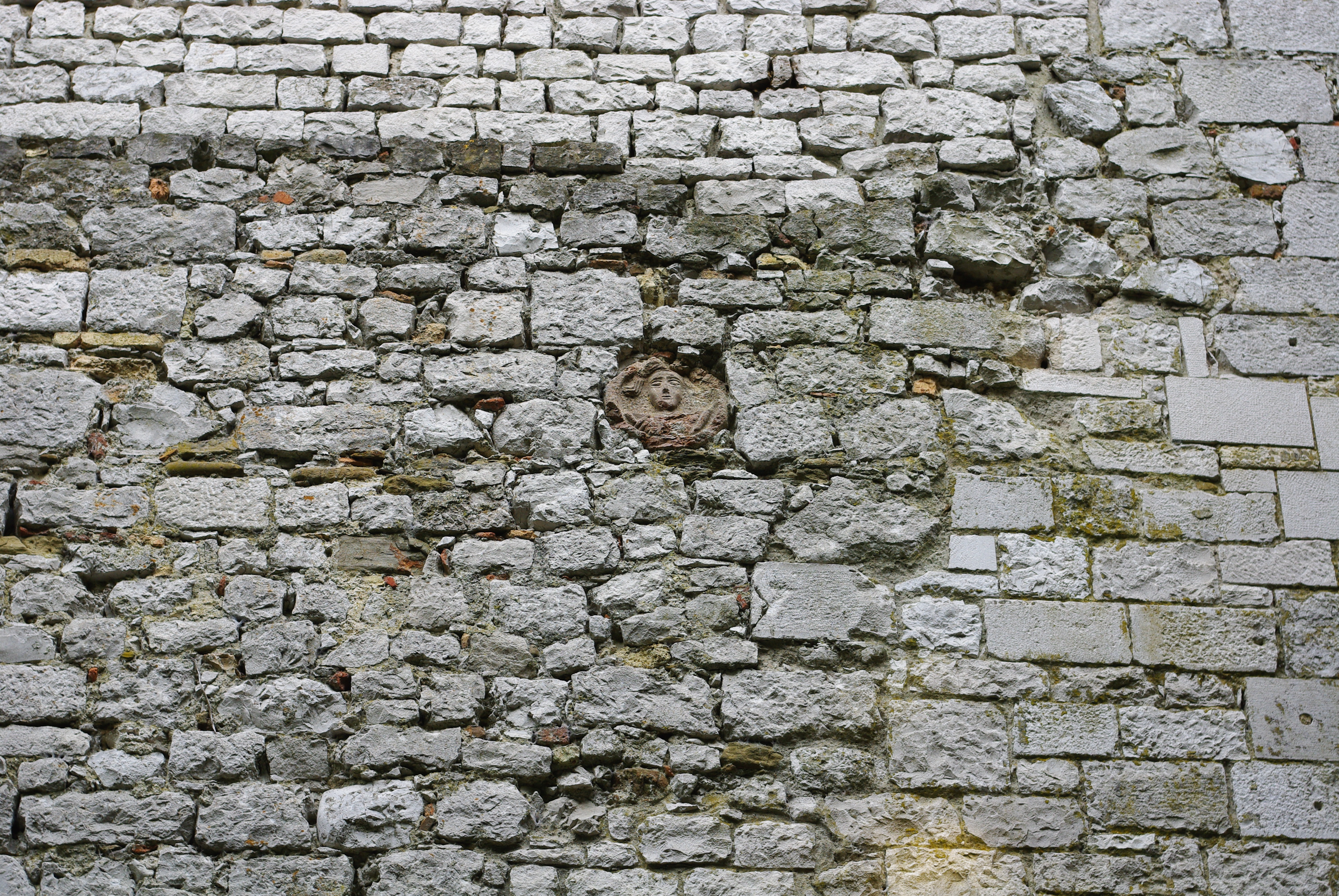
Detail on the wall of basilica San Giovanni in Tuba

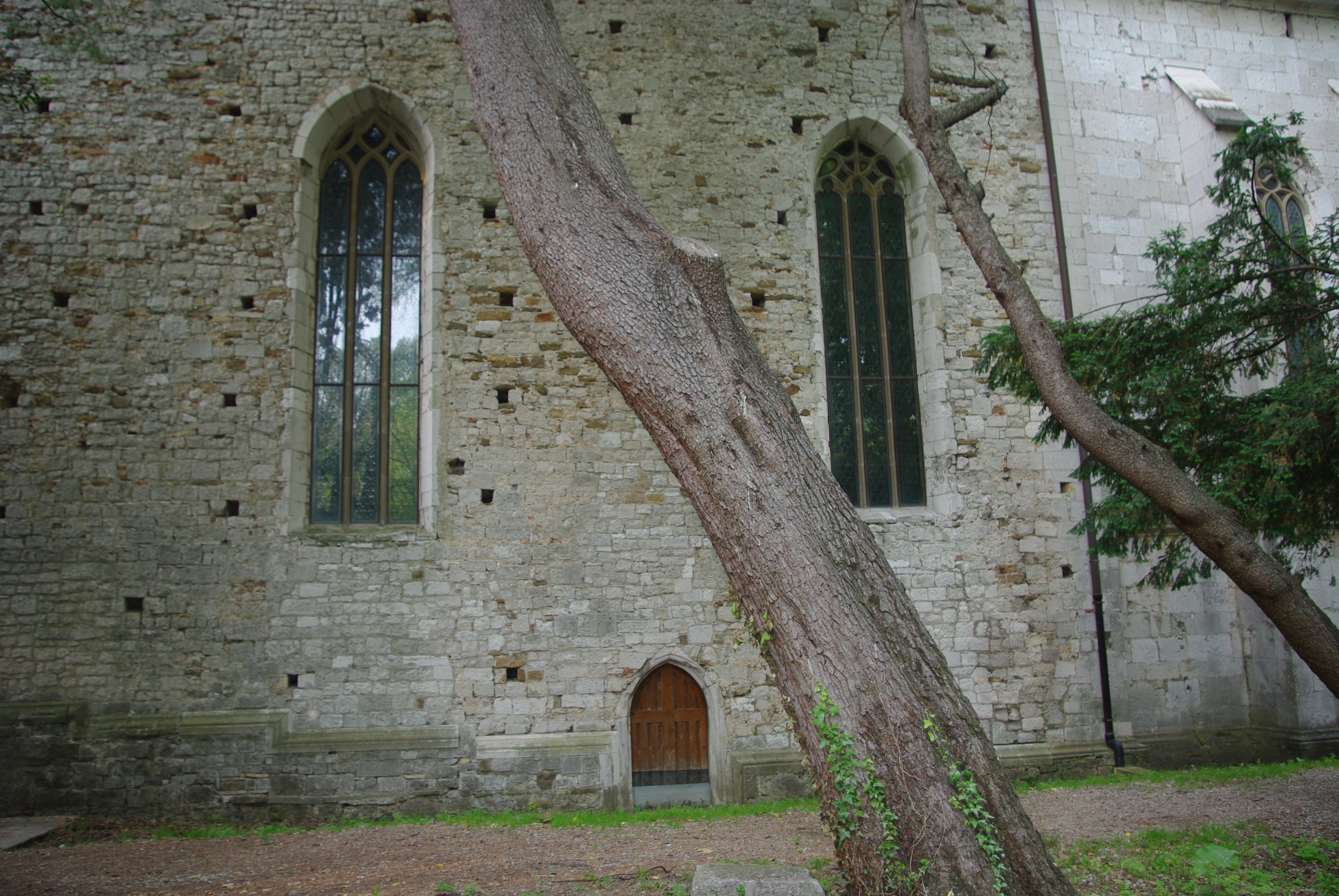
Gothic eyes of the church

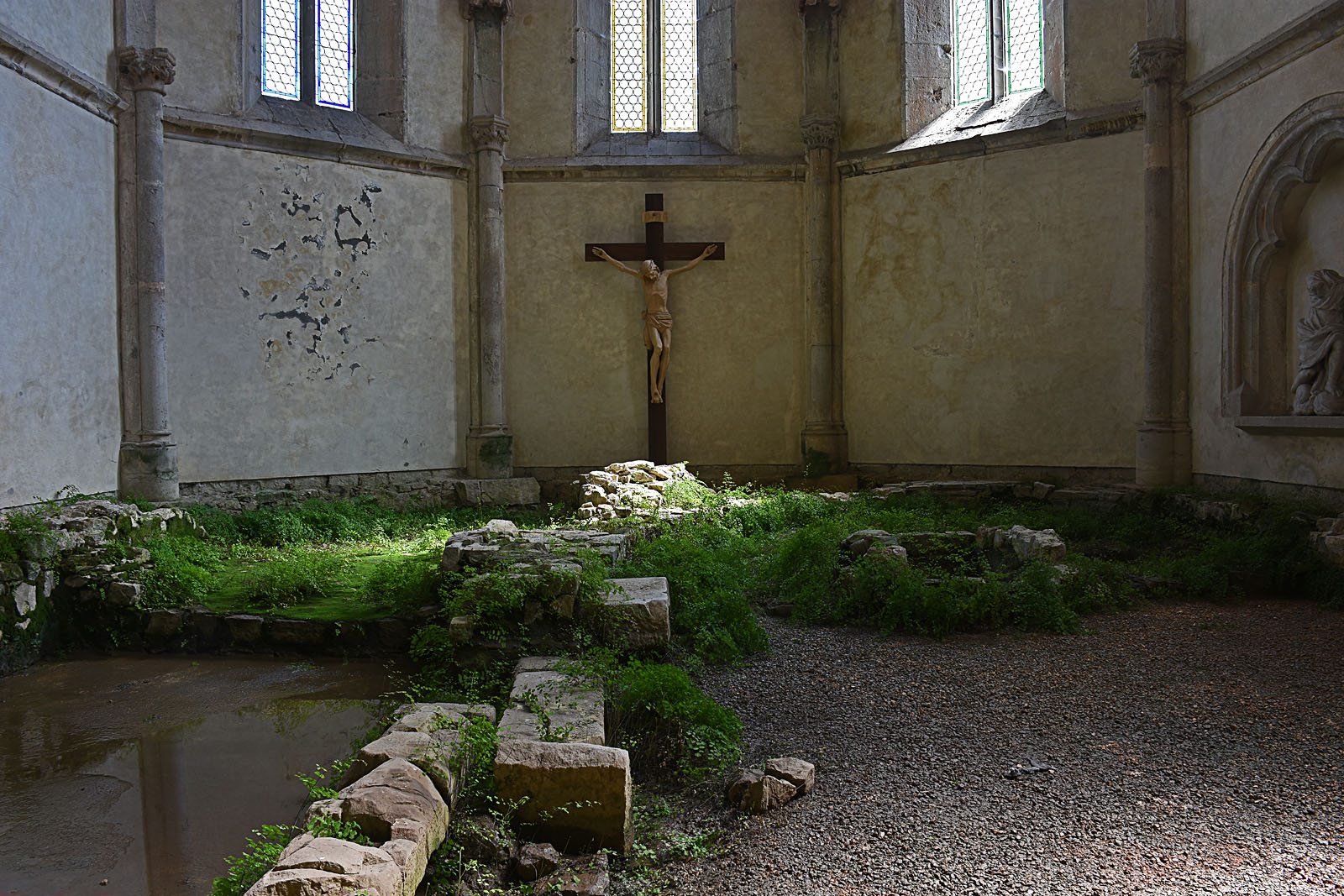
Interior

== See also ==
- Duino Mithraeum
