= Church of St. John the Baptist, Radom =

Church of St. John the Baptist
- Kościół św. Jana Chrzciciela w Radomiu
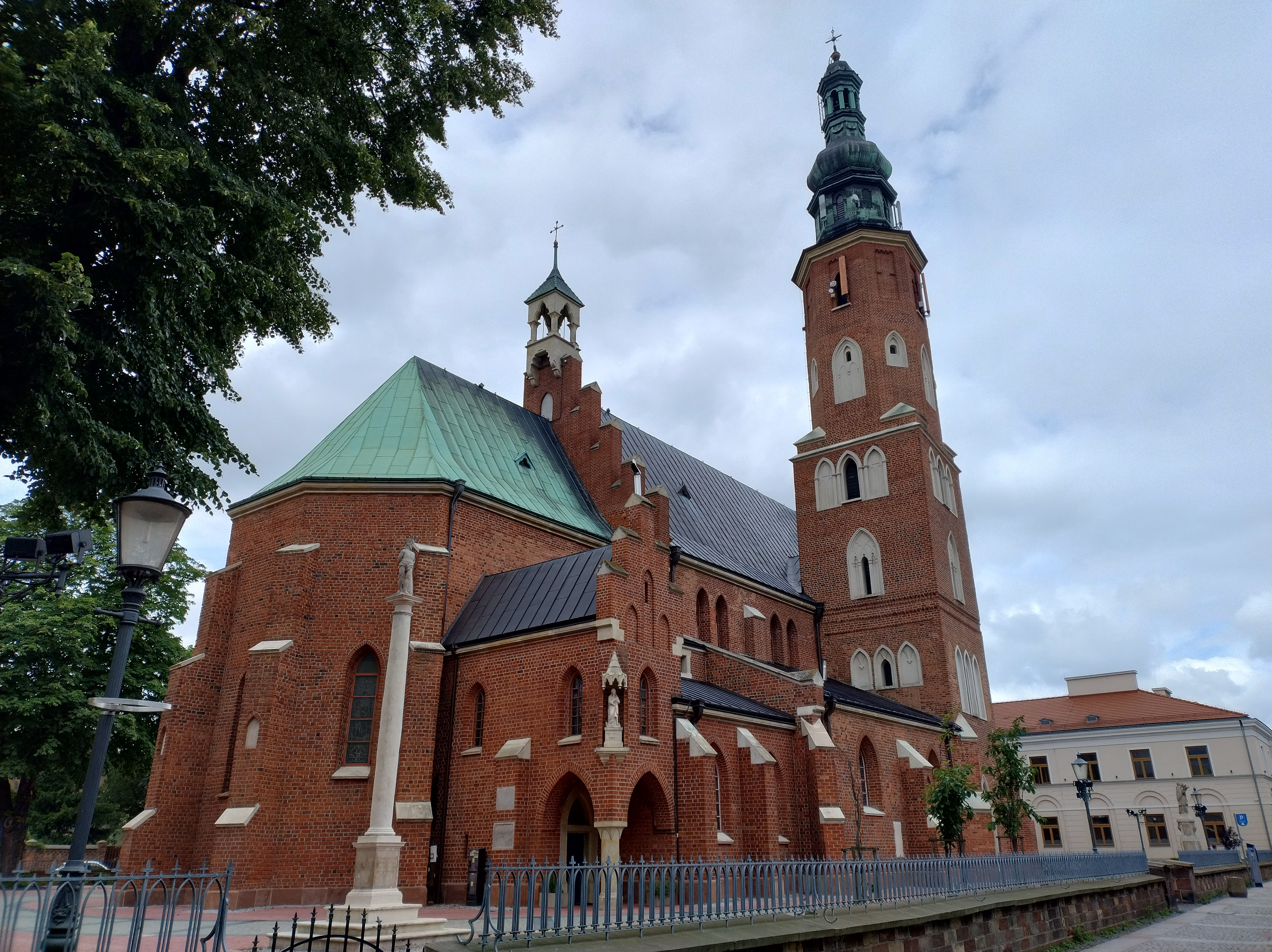
- The church in 2025
- Church of St. John the Baptist
- 51°24′08″N 21°8′40″E
- Location: Radom
- Country: Poland

History
- Founded: 1360
- Founder: Casimir III

Architecture
- Heritage designation: Register of monuments
- Style: Gothic

The Church of St. John the Baptist is a gothic church in Radom, Poland. It was founded in the 14th century and is listed as a protected monument in Poland.

== History ==
According to historian Paul Crossley who referenced chronicler Jan Długosz, the St. John parish church was a "royal foundation" that was created in 1360, around the time when King Casimir the Great expanded the entire town of Radom in the 14th century. The church has been heavily modified since that period. The site was originally in close proximity to the market square and castle.

A Renaissance-style chapel was added in 1630. The chapel features a polychromed vault and was endowed by the Kochanowski family.

In 2020, the parish received a grant of 100,000 zlotys for renovations from the Mazovian Voivodeship Conservator of Monuments. That year, the church also announced plans to renovate the church square.

== See also ==
- Gothic architecture in modern Poland
