= Taytay Church =

Roman Catholic church in Rizal, Philippines

- Minor Basilica and Parish of St. John the Baptist
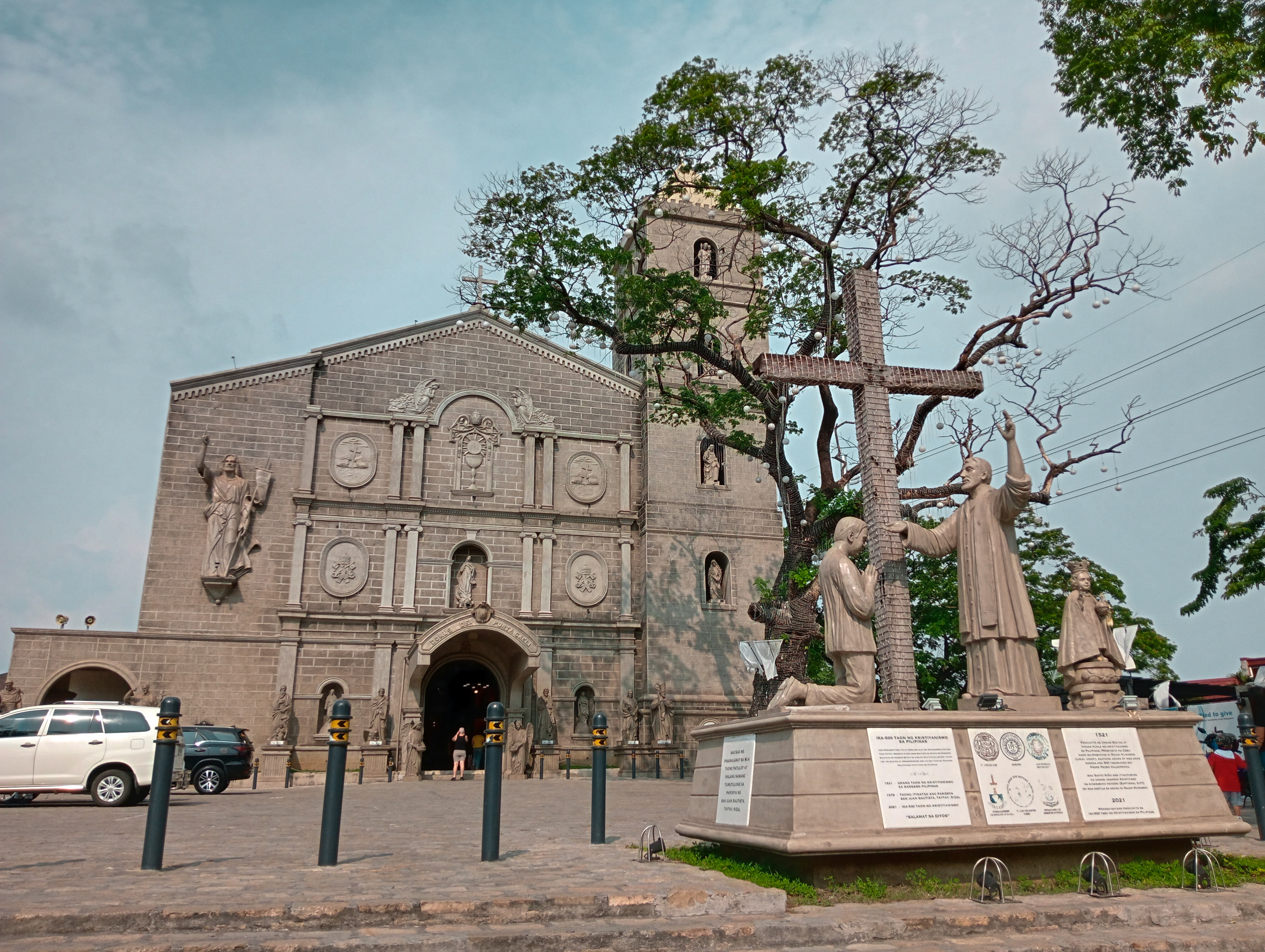
- The church in 2023

- Location in Luzon Location in the Philippines
- 14°34′17″N 121°07′57″E
- Location: J. Sumulong St., Brgy. San Isidro, Taytay, Rizal
- Country: Philippines
- Denomination: Roman Catholic

History
- Former name: St. John the Baptist Parish
- Status: Minor Basilica
- Founded: 1579
- Dedication: John the Baptist

Architecture
- Architectural type: Church building
- Completed: 1630

Administration
- Province: Manila
- Diocese: Antipolo
- Deanery: St. John the Baptist
- Parish: St. John the Baptist

Clergy
- Rector: Rev. Fr. Rowie Roan Reyes

The Minor Basilica and Parish of Saint John the Baptist, commonly known as Taytay Church, is a Roman Catholic church located in Taytay, Rizal, Philippines. It is under the jurisdiction of the Diocese of Antipolo.

== History ==
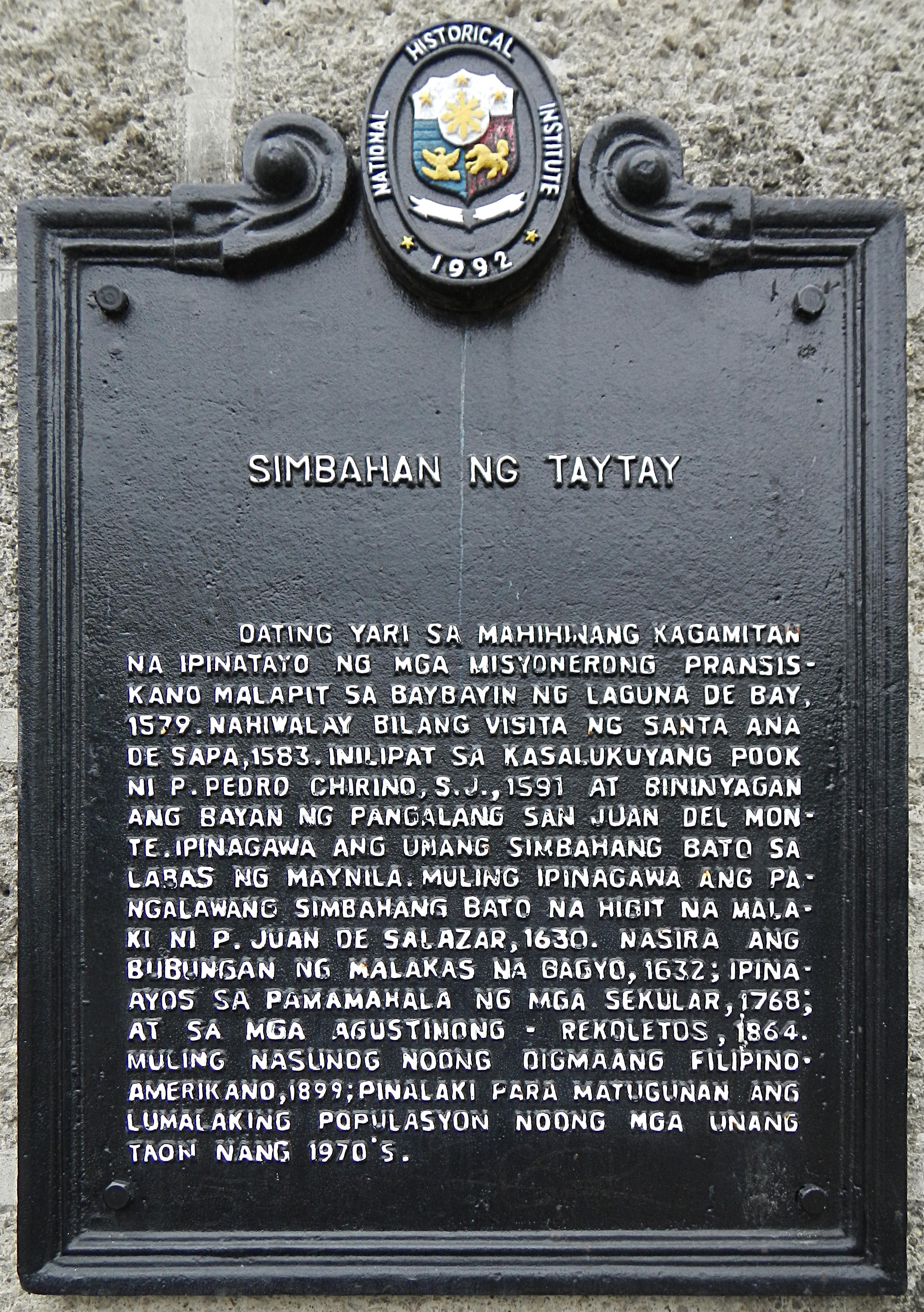
Church NHI historical marker installed in 1992

Franciscan missionaries first arrived to establish a parish in Taytay in 1579 and built a chapel made of light materials near the shores of Laguna de Bay named "Visita de Santa Ana de Sapa", dedicated to its patron saint, John the Baptist. Jesuit missionaries took over the administration of the parish in 1591, with Rev. Pedro Chirino becoming parish priest. Under Chirino, the parish was relocated from the flood-prone shores of Laguna de Bay to a higher location in a hill which was called San Juan del Monte where the parish has remained to this day.

It was during his stint as parish priest that Rev. Chirino began to document the Tagalog language as well as the way of life of Filipinos from his interactions with the inhabitants, forming the basis for his book "Relación de las Islas Filipinas".

A new church made of stone was built in 1599. Completed in 1601, it was considered to be the first church built by the Jesuits out of stone outside Manila. A larger church was constructed in 1630 by Fr. Juan de Salazar. In 1632, a typhoon blew away the roofing of the new church, which was soon replaced with the help of the townspeople. The church sustained significant damage in 1639 when the Chinese set fire to the church in their revolt against Spanish authorities.

=== Blessed Diego de San Vitores and St. Pedro Calungsod ===
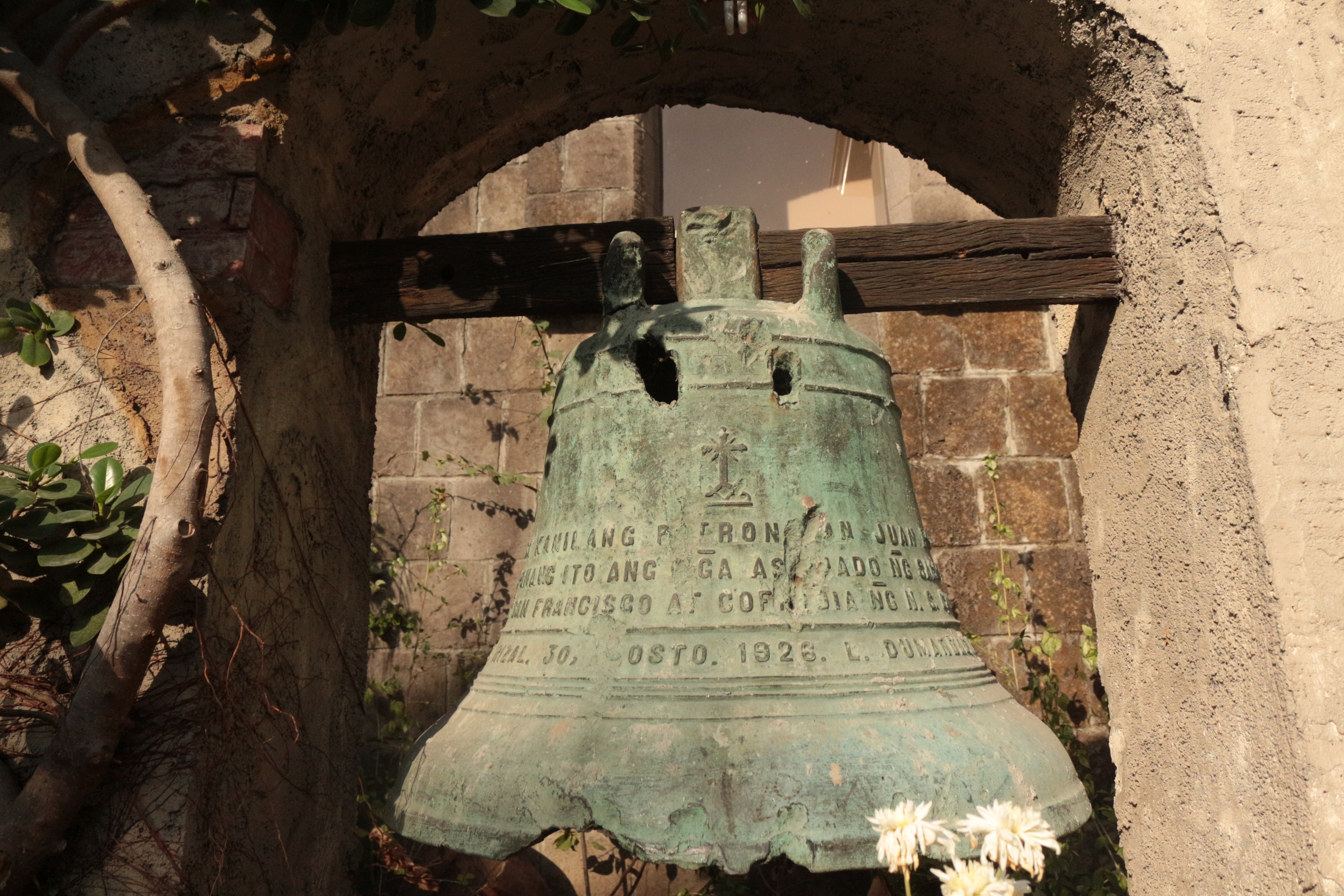
Heritage bell

Diego Luis de San Vitores was a Jesuit missionary who was assigned to Taytay from 1662 to 1668. In 1666, the Jesuits assigned a young boy named Pedro Calungsod as an altar boy in the church. Calungsod would eventually become San Vitores' assistant throughout the latter's assignment in Taytay.

San Vitores was eventually assigned to be a missionary in the Marianas Islands in 1668 and Calungsod went with him as his assistant. It was in the Marianas where they would meet their martyrdom in 1672. San Vitores was among the martyred missionaries in the Mariana beatified by the Catholic Church in 1985. Calungsod was beatified in 2000 and canonized in 2012.

=== Later works and expansion ===
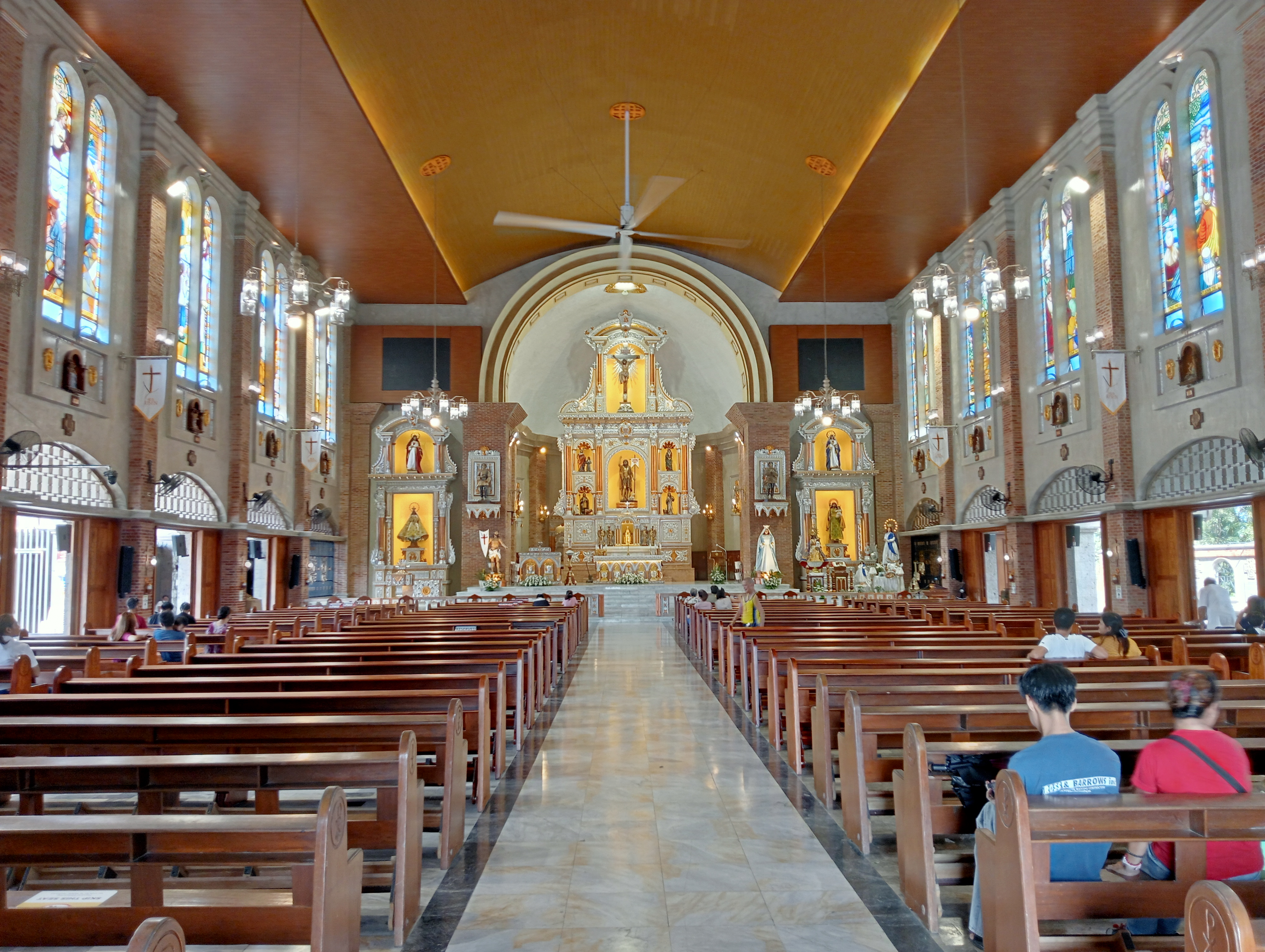
Church interior in 2023

Additional works were made to the church in 1768 and 1864. Both the church and the convent were reduced to ruins during the Philippine–American War. The church remained in such state until it was reconstructed after the War. The present church is built from concrete and bears no trace of the old Jesuit Church.

=== Elevation to Minor Basilica ===
On January 11, 2024, Rev. Fr. Pedrito Noel Rabonza III, the parish priest, announced that Pope Francis had granted the parish church an elevation to the title of minor basilica. The solemn declaration of the basilica was held on July 9, 2024.

== See also ==
- List of Catholic basilicas
