= List of cities in Jordan =

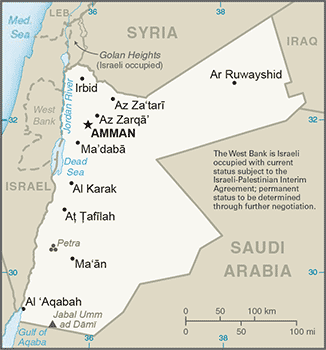
Map of Jordan

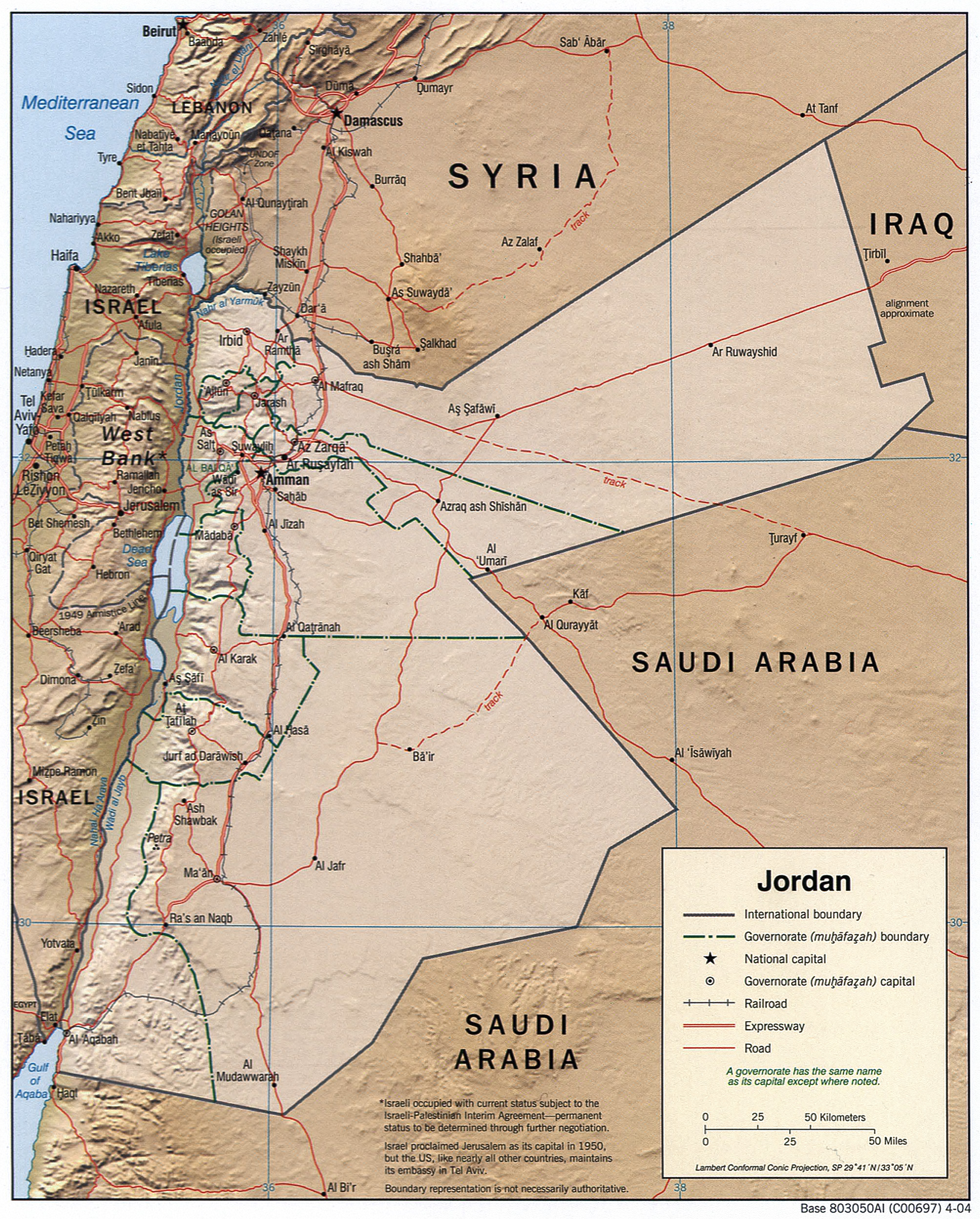
Relief map of Jordan

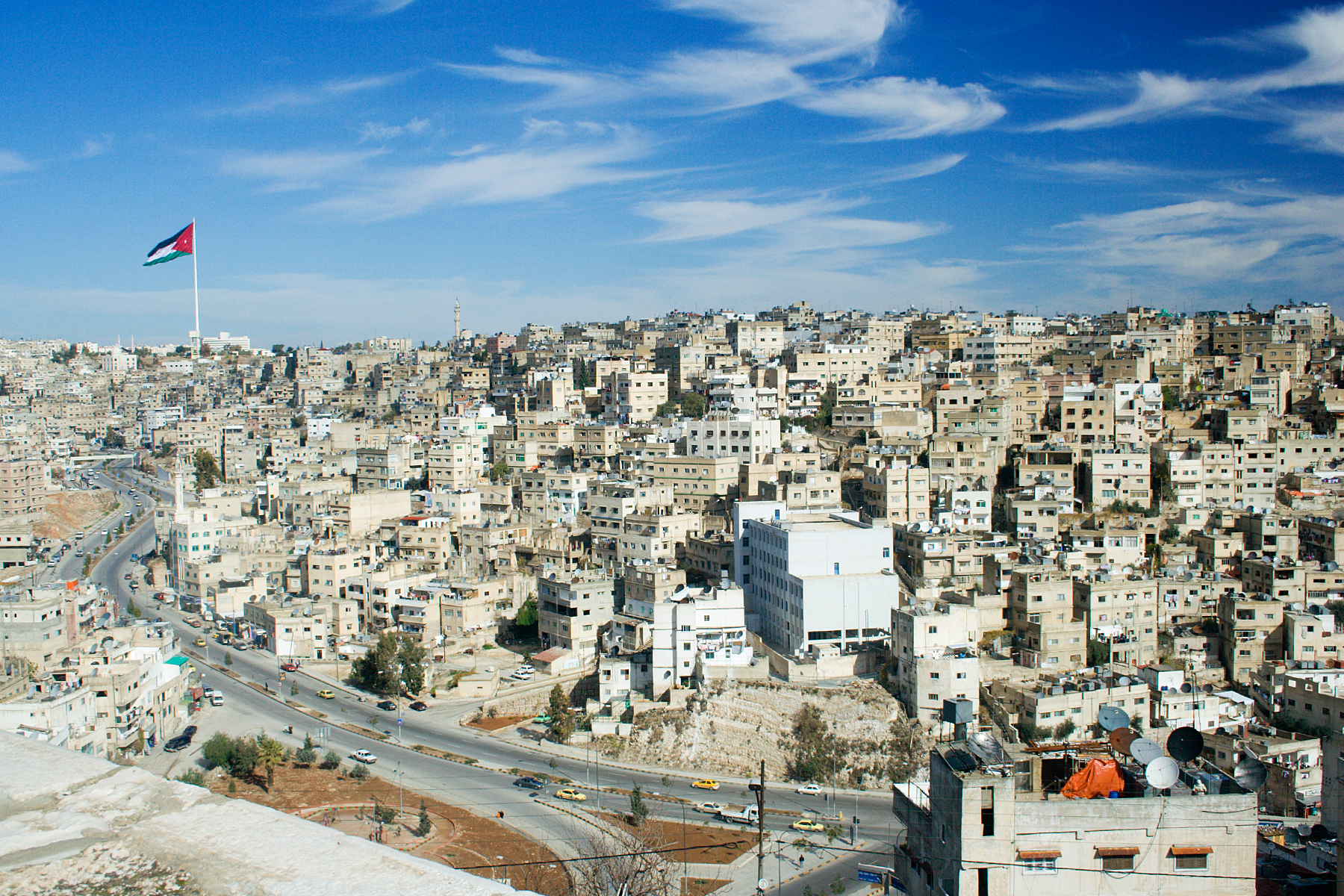
Amman, capital of Jordan

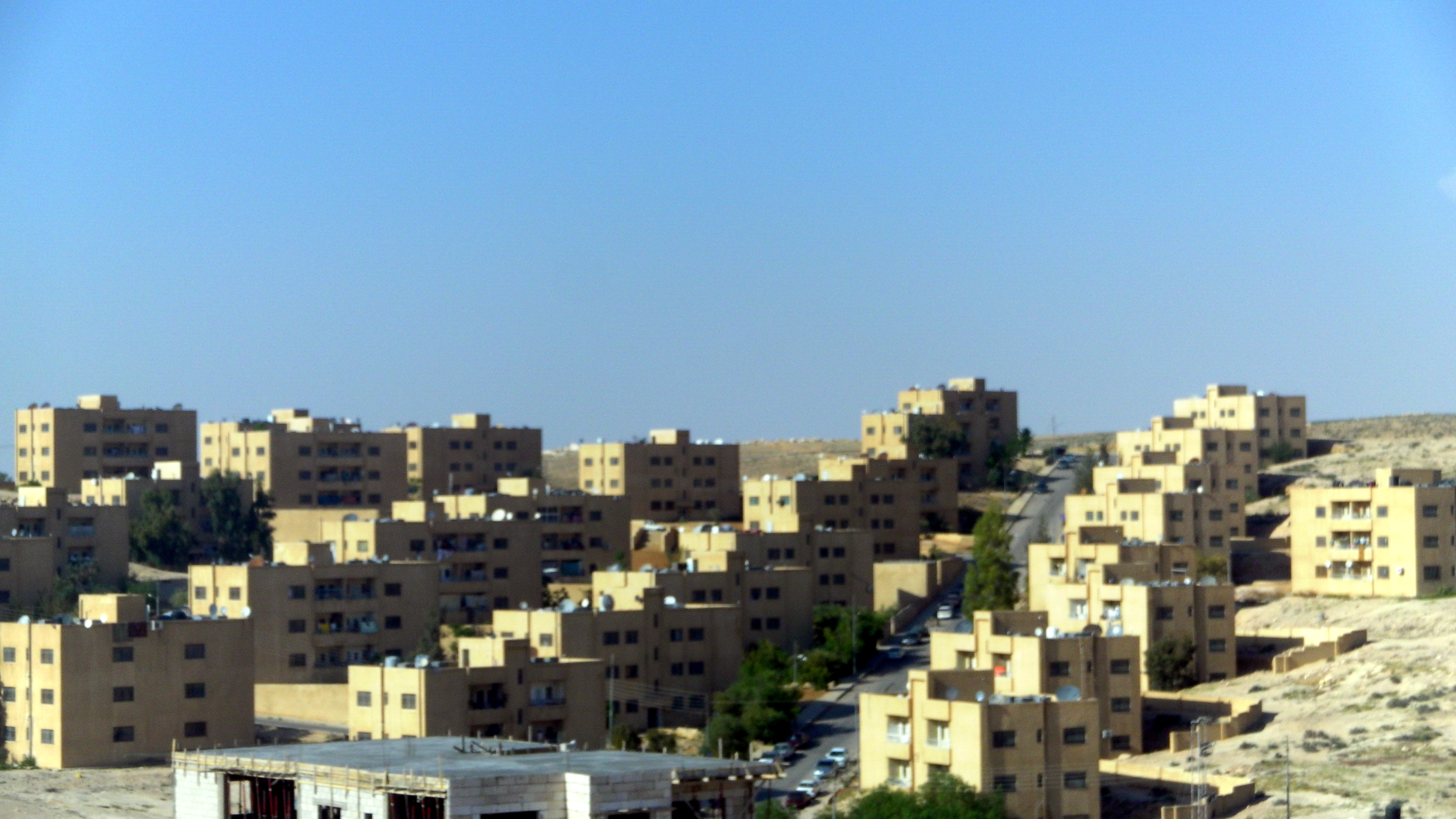
Zarqa

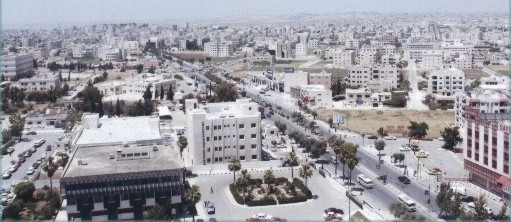
Irbid

== List ==
Cities and urban localities with a population of higher than 20,000 are listed below.

Note that the first three population columns are based on censuses, while the last column is from an estimate.

| Rank | Name | Arabic name | 1994 | 2004 | 2015 | 2021 | Governorate |
|---|---|---|---|---|---|---|---|
| 1. | Amman | عمان | 1,439,212 | 1,746,741 | 3,506,068 | 4,061,150 | Amman |
| 2. | Zarqa | الزرقاء | 350,849 | 395,227 | 635,160 | 735,744 | Zarqa |
| 3. | Irbid | إربد | 208,329 | 250,645 | 502,714 | 582,276 | Irbid |
| 4. | Russeifa | الرصيفة | 137,247 | 227,735 | 472,604 | 547,442 | Zarqa |
| 5. | Sahab | سحاب | 49,060 | 57,037 | 169,434 | 196,260 | Amman |
| 6. | Ar Ramtha | الرمثا | 55,022 | 71,433 | 155,693 | 180,335 | Irbid |
| 7. | Aqaba | العقبة | 62,773 | 80,059 | 148,398 | 171,848 | Aqaba |
| 8. | Mafraq | المفرق | 38,393 | 47,764 | 106,008 | 122,785 | Mafraq |
| 9. | Madaba | مأدبا | 55,749 | 70,338 | 105,353 | 122,008 | Madaba |
| 10. | As-Salt | السلط | 56,458 | 73,528 | 99,890 | 115,695 | al-Balqa |
| 11. | Al-Jizah | الجيزة | 32,446 | 35,357 | 95,045 | 110,097 | Amman |
| 12. | Ain Al-Basha | عين الباشا | 21,347 | 37,222 | 60,191 | 69,716 | al-Balqa |
| 13. | Aydoun | إيدون | 14,661 | 18,586 | 58,565 | 67,835 | Irbid |
| 14. | Ad-Dhlail | الضليل | 15,353 | 27,643 | 50,931 | 58,997 | Zarqa |
| 15. | Jerash | جرش | 21,278 | 31,652 | 50,745 | 58,760 | Jerash |
| 16. | As-Sarih | الصريح | 15,957 | 19,210 | 46,003 | 53,284 | Irbid |
| 17. | Al-Hashimiyah | الهاشمية | 13,171 | 25,475 | 44,730 | 51,812 | Zarqa |
| 18. | Ma'an | معان | 22,989 | 26,461 | 41,055 | 47,640 | Ma'an |
| 19. | Beit Ras | بيت راس | 11,475 | 18,023 | 40,871 | 47,339 | Irbid |
| 20. | Al Husn | الحصن | 16,302 | 20,485 | 35,085 | 40,638 | Irbid |
| 21. | At-Turrah | الطرة | 11,664 | 14,844 | 33,136 | 38,380 | Irbid |
| 22. | Naour | ناعور | 12,340 | 15,439 | 32,337 | 37,457 | Amman |
| 23. | Karak | الكرك | 18,633 | 20,280 | 32,216 | 37,314 | Karak |
| 24. | Kufranjah | كفرنجة | 16,908 | 21,734 | 31,015 | 35,936 | Ajloun |
| 25. | Der Abi Saeed | دير أبي سعيد | 8,303 | 13,792 | 29,590 | 34,272 | Irbid |
| 26. | No'ayymeh | النعيمة | 9,993 | 12,441 | 29,128 | 33,738 | Irbid |
| 27. | Ash-Shajarah | الشجرة | 8,970 | 11,523 | 27,902 | 32,318 | Irbid |
| 28. | Tafilah | الطفيلة | 20,881 | 23,512 | 27,559 | 31,907 | Tafilah |
| 29. | Mu'tah | مؤتة | 8,211 | 11,910 | 27,426 | 31,762 | Karak |
| 30. | Ghor es-Safi | غور الصافي | 13,505 | 16,756 | 27,304 | 31,624 | Karak |
| 31. | Anjara | عنجرة | 13,800 | 17,618 | 25,981 | 30,100 | Ajloun |
| 32. | Al Mashar'e | المشارع | 14,933 | 18,282 | 24,117 | 27,930 | Irbid |
| 33. | Huwwarah | حوارة | 9,757 | 12,753 | 23,929 | 27,716 | Irbid |
| 34. | Kafr Yubah | كفر يوبا | 8,581 | 11,249 | 22,943 | 26,574 | Irbid |
| 35. | Kuraymeh | كريمة | 14,231 | 15,733 | 22,081 | 25,576 | Irbid |
| 36. | At-Taybeh | الطيبة | 10,065 | 12,712 | 21,938 | 25,409 | Irbid |
| 37. | Al-Mazar Ash-Shamali | المزار الشمالي | 10,475 | 12,114 | 21,201 | 24,556 | Irbid |
| 38. | As-Sukhneh | السخنة | 9,557 | 12,687 | 20,693 | 23,969 | Zarqa |
| 39. | Al-Khalidiyah Al-Jadeedah | الخالدية الجديدة | 7,812 | 10,334 | 19,608 | 22,710 | Mafraq |
| 40. | Bushra | بشرى | 8,539 | 11,377 | 19,444 | 22,521 | Irbid |
| 41. | Um Al-Sumaq Al-Janoubi | أم السماق الجنوبي | 2,913 | 5,410 | 19,034 | 22,048 | Amman |
| 42. | Judayteh | جديتا | 9,629 | 11,409 | 18,991 | 21,996 | Irbid |
| 43. | Fuheis | الفحيص | 10,098 | 11,641 | 18,961 | 21,908 | Balqa |
| 44. | Al-Mazar al-Janoubi | المزار الجنوبي | N/A | 10,384 | 18,821 | 21,796 | Karak |
| 45. | Shuna Ash-Shamaliyeh | الشونة الشمالية | 12,664 | 14,365 | 18,821 | 21,306 | Irbid |
| 46. | Kafr Al-Ma’ | كفر الماء | N/A | 9,839 | 17,919 | 20,754 | Irbid |
| 47. | Mahis | ماحص | 8,000 | 10,649 | 17,754 | 20,562 | Balqa |
| 48. | Amra City | مدينة عمرة | 0 | 0 | 0 | 0 | Amman |

== See also ==
- Palestinian refugee camps in Jordan
- Zaatari refugee camp
- Mrajeeb Al Fhood refugee camp
- List of twin towns and sister cities in Jordan
- Governorates of Jordan
- Districts of Jordan
