= Zayadina =

Arab clan based in the Galilee

The Zayadina (also transliterated Ziyadina or Ziyadneh; singular Zaydani or Zidany), or the Banu Zaydan, were an Arab tribal family based in the Galilee whose members served as local multazims (tax farmers) during the Ottoman period. Their best known sheikh, Daher al-Umar, became the strongman of northern Palestine and surrounding areas through economic monopolies, popular support, and military strength in the mid-18th century.

== Emergence ==
The Zayadina were a family of Bedouin origin. They moved to the Galilee in the second half of the 17th century. By the time of Daher al-Umar's grandfather's generation, they transitioned from partial nomadism to a settled life as cultivators. The origins of the family before this time are obscure. Near-contemporary chroniclers of the family, Abbud al-Sabbagh (Note: Abbud al-Sabbagh was a descendant of Daher's chief adviser Ibrahim al-Sabbagh and one of the two main near-contemporary sources for Daher al-Umar's biography; the other main sources was another descendant of Ibrahim, Mikha'il Niqula al-Sabbagh. Abbud is generally considered more reliable than Mikha'il.) and Isa al-Ma'luf, name Zaydan as the family's eponymous ancestor while members of the family claim descent from Zayd, the son of Hasan and grandson of Ali, the fourth caliph of Islam. The Zayadina were Sunni Muslims. Mikha'il al-Sabbagh, another near-contemporary chronicler, places the Zayadina as a small family (a'ila) of some fifty members in the environs of Maarrat al-Numan before their migration to the Galilee. In Maarrat al-Numan, which sits on the main road between the major Syrian cities of Aleppo and Damascus, they lived under the protection of a tribe called the Banu Asad. The historian Ahmad Joudah cautions on this point that Mikha'il's narrative contains several "popular type stories" and that he could not identify a 'Banu Asad' among the Syrian tribes of that period.

The initial area of the Zayadina's settlement in the Galilee was in or around Tiberias, (Note: This version derives from the chronicles of Mikha'il al-Sabbagh and Abbud al-Sabbagh.) then shortly after in the village of Arrabat al-Battuf (Arraba) in the adjoining Shaghur muqata'a (fiscal district). (Note: According to Mikha'il al-Sabbagh and the late 19th-century Damascene writer Nu'man al-Qasatili, the Zayadina were invited to settle in Arraba by the Banu Saqr, the Bedouin tribe which dominated the wider region between Safed and Nablus. A variant of this story dates the move to Arraba to c. 1707 when a teenaged Daher al-Umar killed a Tiberian man during a brawl, prompting Daher's eldest brother Sa'd to relocate the family. The Banu Saqr thereupon invited them to settle in Arraba, which was away from the main highways but conveniently located between the chief centers of Tiberias, Safed and Nazareth.) Oral histories first relayed by the Damascene writer Nu'man al-Qasatili (1877) note that the Zaydani sheikh who established the family in Arraba became the sheikh of Shaghur after defeating the Druze sheikh of the nearby village of Sallama. This event, hadithat Sallama (the 'Sallama incident'), is tentatively dated by historian Kais Firro to 1688–1692. (Note: Qasatili, writing in 1877, relied on oral traditions as his source for the Sallama incident, which is otherwise unmentioned by the near contemporary chroniclers Mikha'il and Abbud al-Sabbagh. It was also referred to by the scholar As'ad Mansur in his 1926 publication. The Nazareth scholar Niqula Sima'an Farraj, writing in 1926, does not mention Sallama but notes that the Zayadina first established themselves in Arraba and the Shaghur district after defeating a Druze family. Information about the Sallama incident is further traced to local Druze and Muslim oral traditions gathered by the Nazareth historian Tawfiq Mu'ammar in his 1979 publication. Sallama's destruction by the Zayadina is noted by Claude Reignier Conder and Herbert Kitchener in the 1870s.) Sallama was destroyed along with nine other close-by Druze villages (Kammaneh, Dallata, Nijmiyya, Umm al-Amad, al-Marjam, Sabbana, Jazur and al-Rabadiyya) at that time, or at least by the start of the 18th century as the Zayadina consolidated power in the area. The Sallama incident sealed the Zayadina's power in the Shaghur, after which they obtained its iltizam (tax farm). The 19th-century chroniclers disagree on the name of the Zaydani sheikh who first established the family in the Galilee, with some referring to him simply as Abu Zaydan (lit. 'father of Zaydan'). This sheikh, assuming he was the grandfather of Daher al-Umar, (Note: The Damascene chronicler Khalil al-Muradi (d. 1791) confirms that Daher's grandfather was a local governor in the Galilee, as were Daher's father and uncles.) was later identified as 'Salih'. (Note: The name of Daher al-Umar's grandfather, who was not mentioned directly in the contemporary sources, was confirmed as 'Salih' in a mosque inscription found in the village of Damun dated to 1722–1723, which credited Daher's paternal uncle, Ali ibn Salih ('Ali son of Salih'), as its builder, thereby settling the debate of Daher's grandfather's name, according to historian Tawfiq Mu'ammar.)

Salih's son Umar al-Zaydani was appointed the sheikh of bilad Safad (lit. 'lands of Safed', i.e. the Galilee) in 1698–1699 by Bashir Shihab, the emir of the Druze in Mount Lebanon. Bashir had acquired the iltizam of both the Galilee and the predominantly Twelver Shia Muslim (commonly called 'Metawali') districts of Jabal Amil (south Lebanon) from the governor of Sidon Eyalet, Arslan Pasha Matarci. (Note: Sidon Eyalet was an Ottoman province spanning the mountainous regions of Mount Lebanon, Jabal Amil and the Galilee and the adjacent Mediterranean coastal towns of Beirut, Sidon and Acre. The eyalet in the 18th century was divided into muqata'at ('fiscal districts'; sing. muqata'a. The muqata'at spanning the Galilee (geographically referred to as Bilad Safad, were Safed, Jira (the area around Safed), Shaghur or Rameh, Sahil Akka (plain of Acre) or Tarshiha, Tiberias, Nazareth, and Shefa-Amr. The town of Acre was its own muqata'a.) This was in reward for his suppression of the Metawali Ali al-Saghir clan of the Bilad Bishara muqata'a. (Note: Bilad Bishara, Iqlim al-Shumar, Iqlim al-Tuffah, and Shaqif, collectively forming the region of Jabal Amil, were the Metawali-populated muqata'at of Sidon Eyalet.) Afterward, Bashir appointed his Qaysi factional allies in place of his opponents from the Yamani faction to which the Metawali rebel sheikhs belonged. Umar was one such Qaysi sheikh, though his appointment also likely stemmed from the Zayadina's already established power and influence in the Galilee. (Note: Bashir's appointment of Umar al-Zaydani is originally sourced to the early 19th-century Lebanese chronicler of Haydar Ahmad al-Shihabi.) Umar was the preeminent figure among his brothers and as early as 1703 was referred to as the grand chek de ce pays ('paramount sheikh of the country', i.e. the Galilee) in a French consular report. His brother, Ali, is mentioned in other French consular reports, dated to 1704 and 1705, as the sheikh in control of the western Lower Galilee, including the key cotton-growing villages of Shefa-Amr, Tamra and I'billin. A third brother, Hamza (referred to as 'Amsy' in a French consular report from 1708), was active in the vicinity of Nazareth. With the death of Bashir in 1707, the governor of Sidon may have stripped the Zayadina of their tax farms to reassert direct control over the Galilee from the Shihabs. In the summer of 1708, he sought imperial sanction to move against Umar and his brothers for their refusal to remit the full amount of their tax obligations.

== Expansion ==
Despite the efforts of the governor, the Zayadina retained their influence and were strengthened by Bashir's successor, Emir Haydar Shihab, following his victory against government-backed Druze rivals at the Battle of Ain Dara in 1711. By then Umar had died and was succeeded by his eldest son Sa'd al-Umar. Conflict between the governor of Sidon and the Zayadina persisted into the second decade of the 18th century. Punitive campaigns were launched against them and their sheikhs were occasionally imprisoned until their obligations were paid, though the governors never attempted to oust or replace them. The next generation of Zayadina also emerge around this time, other than Sa'd, including Umar's youngest son Daher and Ali's son Muhammad. (Note: Ali lived at least until 1722–1723, as evidenced by the mosque inscription at Damun, where he died at an unknown date. According to Mu'ammar, Ali's tomb formerly stood in the village.) The family often leased their iltizam in Daher's name, hoping this would mitigate their obligations to the government in the event of a default on their tax payments. Daher allied with the Banu Saqr and in c. 1730 took over Tiberias from its government-appointed mutasallim and thereafter obtained its iltizam. Under Daher, Tiberias was fortified and established as the family's headquarters, though the family of his uncle Ali, now led by Muhammad, maintained its base in Damun in the western Galilee. Daher's dependence on the Bedouin levies of the Banu Saqr was tenuous, especially as his policy of law and order did not align with the Bedouins' highway banditry and village raids. Daher raised a 200-strong troop of Zaydani horsemen and put them under Muhammad's command. As locals, Daher and the Zayadina enjoyed the support of the inhabitants of their muqata'at.

In 1738, Daher mobilized a 1,500-strong force of Zaydani horsemen and local levies and defeated Sheikh Ahmad al-Husayn, (Note: Ahmad's father, Husayn ibn Khaliq, was named as the holder of Jiddin fortress in an Ottoman firman from June 1738. Husayn and/or his cousin Najm had been multazims of Sahil Akka from as early as 1704, when Najm was forging trade agreements with the Dutch merchant Paul Maashoek.) who controlled the muqata'a of Sahil Akka from his fortress in Jiddin. Daher's takeover was solicited by the peasants of Sahil Akka who sought relief from the Husayns' heavy-handedness and the harassment of the Bedouins. The Zayadina effectively gained control of Jiddin's dependencies, Abu Sinan and Tarshiha. Daher was subsequently granted the iltizam of Sahil Akka, but kept the Husayns in place as his vassals, subleasing the iltizam to them. Daher also began to procure his private army of Maghrebi mercenaries during this conflict, which greatly strengthened him against his regional counterparts.

Between 1738 and 1740, the Zayadina expanded their control northward, gaining the surrender of the key town of Safed, which was the traditional administrative center of the Galilee and from the high hilltop it occupied, gave its holder a commanding view of the surrounding countryside. Its multazim at that time had been Muhammad al-Nafi', (Note: Muhammad ibn Nafi' was named as the sheikh of the fortress of Suhmata in an Ottoman firman from June 1738. His father, Nafi, had been the multazim of the Jira muqata'a, which encompassed Safed's surrounding countryside, in the second decade of the 18th century.) who capitulated after a negotiated surrender. Al-Nafi' similarly surrendered his other fortress villages of Suhmata and Bi'ina to Daher. The Zayadina's struggle over the other main fortress village in the vicinity, Deir al-Qassi, concluded with its surrender by Daher's marriage to the daughter of its sheikh, Abd al-Khaliq Salih. Like the Husayns, Daher kept the Nafi sheikhs in place as vassals in the Safed and Jira muqata'at, along with the sheikhs of the Murad and Shahin families into the early 1760s.

Although administratively part of Safed, Nazareth and the fertile Marj Ibn Amer plain (Jezreel Valley) to its south were effectively dominated by the sheikhs of Jabal Nablus (hill country of Nablus). As early as 1735, Daher entered into conflict over these areas with the Nablus sheikhs, led by the Jarrar and Madi families, who had entered into alliance with Daher's erstwhile supporters, the Banu Saqr. The sheikhs of Nablus were also backed by the governor of Damascus, under whose jurisdiction Nablus belonged. Strategically, Nazareth and Marj Ibn Amer formed the crossroads of the main trade routes linking Damascus with Nablus, and Nazareth further acted as a trade center for the merchants of Nablus. Two of Daher's wives lived in Nazareth, through whom he forged ties with its residents, who favored his religious tolerance and opposed the extortions of the Nablus merchants. With his Zaydani horsemen, Maghrebi infantry and the Nazarenes, Daher defeated the Nablus–Saqr coalition in a battle in the Marj Ibn Amer. Although this victory sealed Zaydani control over Nazareth and Marj Ibn Amer by 1740, the Jarrars repulsed the Zayadina's advance into Jabal Nablus from their hilltop fort at Sanur.

=== Early trading activities ===
The Zayadina may have engaged in trade with Aleppo and Damascus from their time in Maarrat al-Numan. Umar al-Zaydani maintained trade relations with the Damascenes and regional tribes. His sons Sa'd and Daher continued their family's traditional trade with Damascus throughout the 1720s, taking caravans to the city where they bought and sold goods and forged ties with the city's social and commercial elites. The Zayadina's mercantile pursuits enabled them to accumulate the wealth needed to establish themselves as cultivators and tax farmers.

Around the time of the Zayadina's rise, in the late 17th and early 18th centuries, European demand for Levantine raw cotton significantly increased. The French were the dominant European purchaser of Palestinian and Lebanese cotton. The cotton of the Galilee was especially prized for the quality of its fiber. The French merchants of Marseille conducted their trade from their main base in the city of Sidon, but their counterparts in Acre increasingly took up the trade independently of Sidon. (Note: At the start of the 18th century, there were three French nations (merchant communities) represented by consuls in Syria: Aleppo, Tripoli and Sidon. Smaller communities of French merchants operated in Acre, Jaffa and Ramla.) In 1691, there were thirteen French merchants operating out of Acre's Khan al-Ifranj caravansary; at the time, Acre was a ruined but spacious fishing village of 300 people, vulnerable to Bedouin raids by land and Maltese piracy along the coast. The French merchants set the price of cotton which they purchased from the sheikhs or peasants of the villages, but increasing demand and internal competition moved prices higher.

The local sheikhs of the Galilee, the Zayadina chief among them, benefited greatly from the booming cotton trade. During a period of internal rivalry among the French merchants, Paul Maashoek, an enterprising Dutch merchant and British vice-consul of Acre, moved to monopolize the trade in Acre in collaboration with some of the French merchants there, by gaining control of the Galilee's cotton crop at the point of production in the villages. In 1704, he forged an agreement with Daher's uncle Ali (who controlled the region's best cotton-producing villages) stipulating Ali's exclusive sale of his cotton crop to Maashoek in exchange for the latter advancing the full amount of Ali's tax obligation to the governor of Sidon. This developed into the preferred mode of trade among the sheikhs and was increasingly adopted by the French merchants after Maashoek's death in 1711, eventually becoming a "regular forward market", according to historian Thomas Philipp. When Sa'd was imprisoned by the governor of Sidon for failure to pay his obligations, the French merchants paid his bail and he was reinstalled as a tax farmer; in return, Sa'd paid them with the cotton crop of Shefa-Amr, Tamra and I'billin. When it became apparent that the harvest was poor, the French merchants negotiated his debt with Daher in Tiberias. This was Daher's first dealing with the French merchants.

=== Conflict with Damascus ===
Daher and his brothers launched several raids in the early 1730s, focused at first on expanding their hold to Safed but increasingly launching attacks beyond the boundaries of Sidon Eyalet in areas under the jurisdiction of Damascus. Daher attacked and took over four villages in the Nablus Sanjak (part of Damascus) in 1733 and his brothers (Sa'd, Yusuf and/or Salih) launched forays with the Metawalis against areas closer to Damascus, burning eleven villages. These assaults put Daher at loggerheads with the governors of Damascus, prompting imperial orders to the governor of Sidon to rein him in. The latter often delayed any action against Daher to avoid provoking the Zayadina into withholding their tax obligations to Sidon. In 1737 Daher allied with the emir of the Sardiyya Bedouins of the Hauran. Daher had safeguarded the emir's son in Tiberias in 1734 and the Zayadina had forged marital ties with the tribe (Daher's mother and one of his wives were members of the Sardiyya). They raided Damascus itself in an abortive attempt to reinstall the Sardiyya emir to the lucrative office of shaykh al-Sham (chief of the Syrian Bedouin). Daher renewed his attack against Damascus city with the emir Mulhim Shihab not long after and raided the villages in its orbit. In the same year (1738), he raided the Turkmen tribes in the Hauran and razed several villages along the Atlit coast, all areas under Damascene jurisdiction. By then, the Zayadina's relations with the Banu Saqr had soured and during a clash, they captured Daher's brother Salih and sent him to the governor of Damascus, Sulayman Pasha al-Azm, who had him publicly executed. (Note: Al-Muradi names Daher's executed brother 'Mustafa'.)

Zaydani raids against the Hauran, the main source of grain for Damascus and the region through which the important Hajj caravan route passed, continued into 1741. In the preceding years, in anticipation of a military response from the governor of Damascus, the Zayadina strengthened the fortifications of their key towns. Daher built up the walls and towers of Tiberias and a citadel overlooking the town, while Sa'd established a fortified base on the hilltop village of Deir Hanna near Arraba. Tensions came to a head in 1742, when Sulayman Pasha al-Azm, freshly reappointed to Damascus, and his nephew Ibrahim Pasha al-Azm, then governor of Sidon, moved against the Zayadina with express imperial orders to eliminate Daher and raze the Zaydani fortresses. Among those joining in the government offensive were the Druze forces of Mulhim Shihab, the Saqr and Sakhr Bedouins, and the peasant fighters of Jabal Nablus. Daher's forces resisted the subsequent government siege of Tiberias until Sulayman Pasha withdrew to command the Hajj caravan to Mecca. On his return in 1743, it was resumed with a larger and stronger force, but as his forces moved against Sa'd in Deir Hanna, Sulayman Pasha fell ill and died and the offensive was terminated. Sulayman Pasha's nephew and successor, As'ad Pasha al-Azm, refrained from taking action against Daher during his fourteen-year-long term as governor of Damascus. Intermittent tensions between the Zayadina and Damascus persisted during this period, but Daher's attention was concentrated on Acre and Palestine's coast.

== Zenith ==
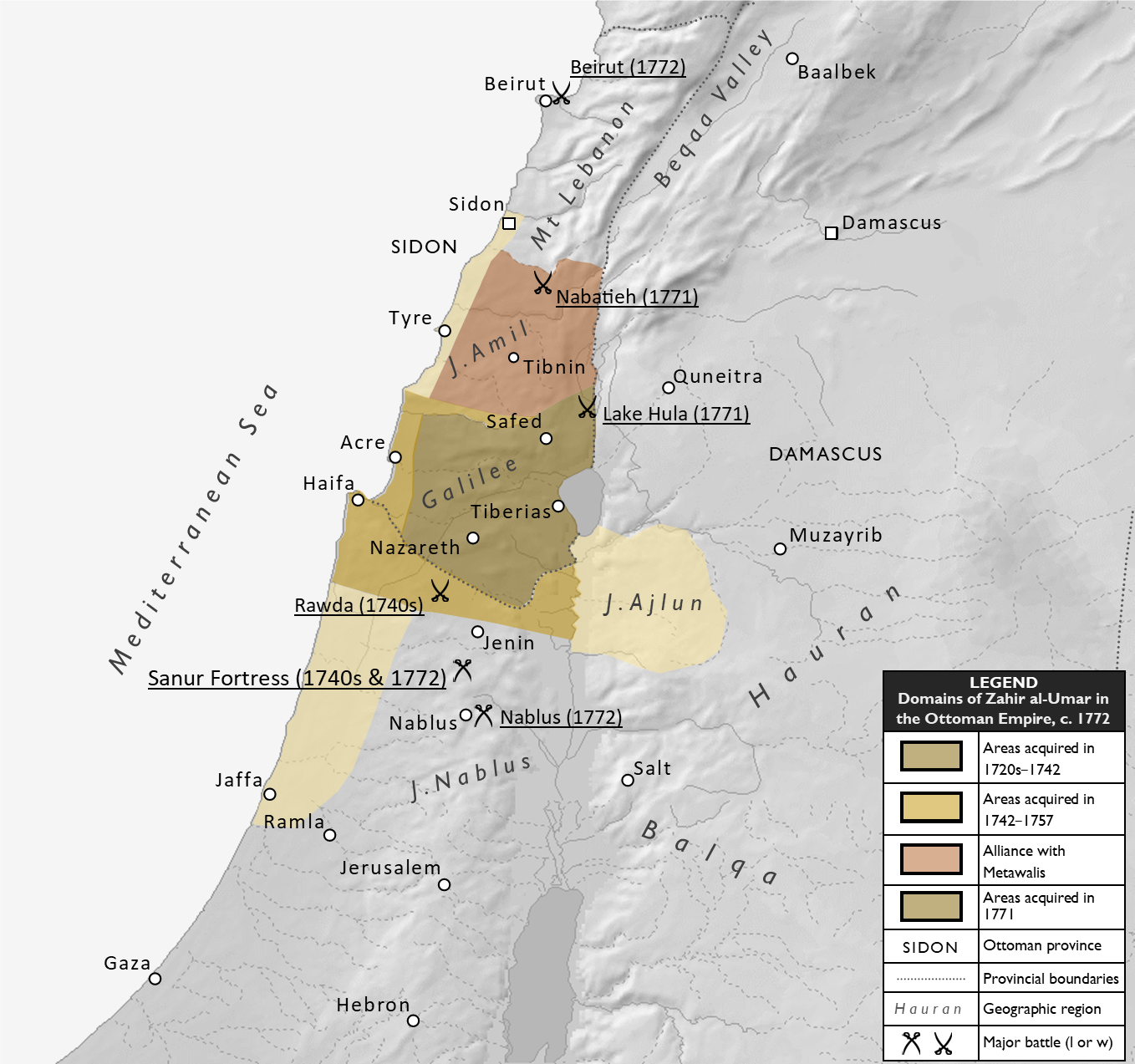
Map showing phases of expansion of the territory controlled by Daher and his subordinates, in c. 1772

With relations with Damascus stabilized and his southern flank against the sheikhs of Nablus secured, Daher accelerated his push to capture Acre in the mid-1740s. The French nation in Acre had grown considerably by then and, geographically, it was "the natural gravitation point for all export trade" moving along the fertile valleys of Jabal Nablus, Marj Ibn Amer and the Galilee to the Mediterranean coast, according to Mahmoud Yazbak. Daher's trade relations with the French increased steadily in the 1730s, with merchants advancing cash to cover his taxes in exchange for his cotton. In 1737 he and the French consul of Sidon collaborated in setting a uniform standard of weight for Galilee cotton. He established contacts in Acre through his agent, the Greek Catholic merchant Yusuf al-Qassis, including a close friendship with Acre's vice consul, Joseph Blanc. Through the early 1740s, Daher sold all his cotton and wheat to Blanc in exchange for cash advances and weapons, which strengthened Daher militarily, politically and financially. This relationship was opposed by the consul of Sidon, who complained that Daher and the Zayadina were becoming rich and powerful at the merchants' expense.

In 1743, Daher had his cousin (and brother-in-law) Muhammad al-Ali of Shefa-Amr eliminated. From his branch of the family's headquarters at Damun, Muhammad's territory and ambitions posed an obstacle to Daher's takeover of Acre. Daher repeated requests for the iltizam of Acre from the governors of Sidon were rejected. Under Sa'd's counsel that the governor could not oppose them militarily, Daher and his troops captured Acre and killed its multazim. According to French consular correspondence, Daher expelled the town's government-appointed agha in 1745. At this time, Daher had relocated his headquarters from Tiberias to Deir Hanna, while he secured his position in Acre. In the second half of 1746, the governor of Sidon recognized Daher as Acre's multazim, granting government legitimacy of his de facto rule over the town. Using Acre's considerable well-preserved ruins as building materials, Daher completed the town's fortifications by 1750 and moved his permanent residence there, making Acre the capital of the Zaydani sheikhdom. In addition to its defenses, Daher rapidly developed Acre and its surroundings considerably, establishing or sponsoring public services, like carvansarerais, markets, mosques, churches, and bathhouses, reclaiming swamplands for agriculture and building water mills. Also by 1750, Daher effectively monopolized the transport and sale of cotton, overcoming French mercantile attempts against this. (Note: Daher extended his monopoly to the cotton-producing region of Bani Sa'b and the valleys of Jabal Nablus; there, the Muslim merchants of Nablus, especially the Tuqan family, had traditionally sold the output to European merchants from the port of Jaffa, but Daher gained control over the trade with his takeover of Jaffa in 1771.) The roughly two decades starting from the early-mid 1740s represented the zenith of Daher's power. During those years, Daher accumulated substantial wealth from the increasingly voluminous and profitable cotton trade, external and internal challenges were largely neutralized, and a durable alliance with the Metawalis was secured putting Jabal Amil under Daher's iltizam. Domestically, the period was characterized by peace and prosperity and significant growth in the population in both the countryside and in Acre.

In 1757, Daher extended his influence to the harbor village of Haifa and by the end of the decade was in control of Mount Carmel and the areas adjoining it to the north and south, including the coastal villages of Tantura and Tira. These acquisitions provoked the new governor of Damascus, Uthman Pasha al-Kurji, as these areas traditionally formed part of the Lajjun Sanjak, administratively subordinate to Damascus. The governor attempted to reimpose authority by sending troop detachments and aghas to Haifa and Tantura, but Daher consistently voided these attempts and became the undisputed potentate of Haifa and its coast by 1761–1762.

== Family rule ==
=== Distribution of control ===
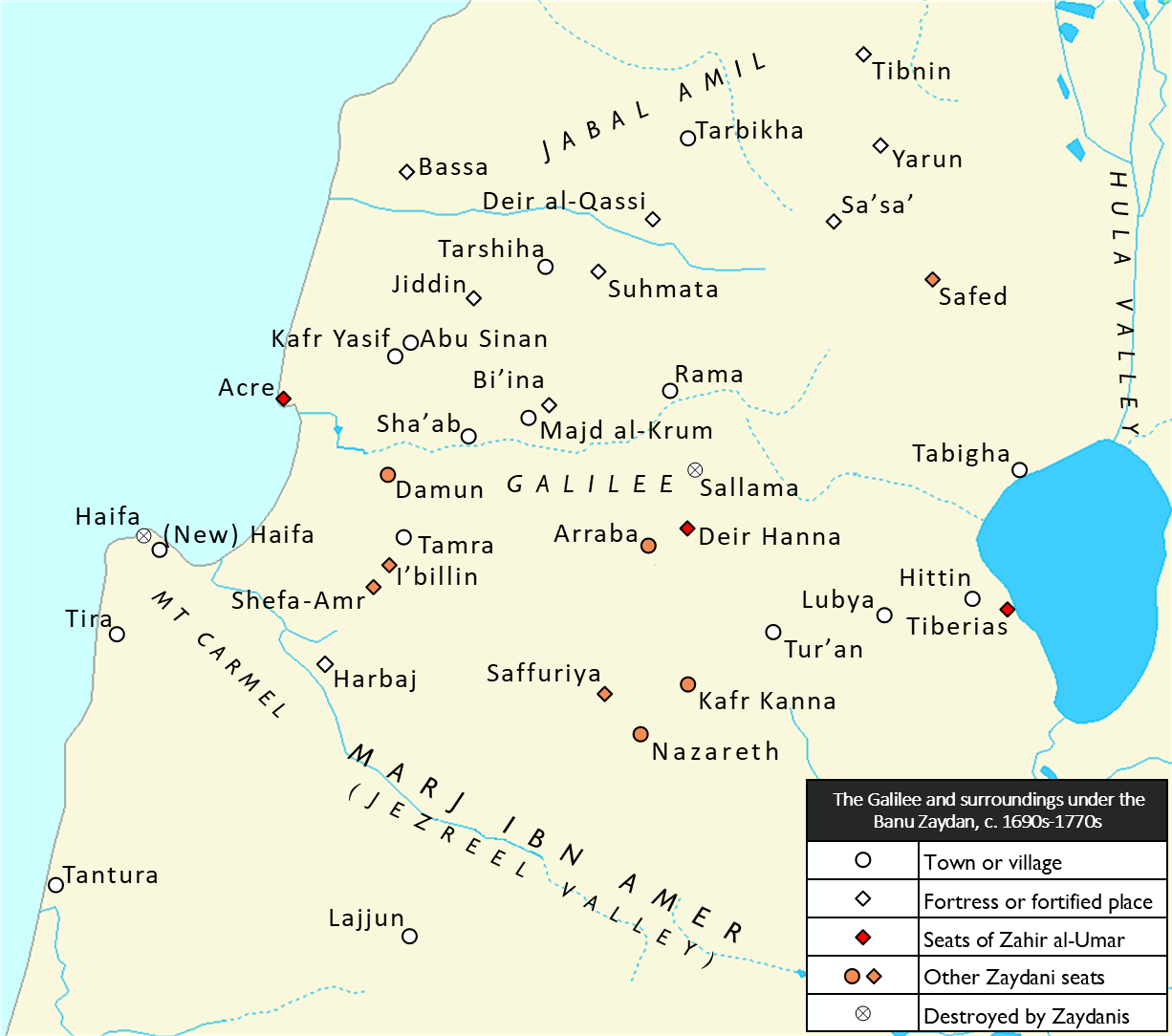
The holdings of the Zayadina under Daher al-Umar in the Galilee and surrounding areas. Daher's seats are indicated in red, while the seats of other Zaydani sheikhs are in orange

Although Daher largely preserved the local power structures in the muqata'at he conquered in the Galilee, he set up his sons or other family members with armed retinues in strategic villages and married them into the local nobility to ensure the family's interests. According to historian Amnon Cohen, this positioning enabled Daher "to impose his will" on his vassal sheikhs "and protect the population from outside attack". Beyond Acre, which Daher governed directly, the key fortress villages were Tiberias, Safed, Shefa-Amr, Deir Hanna and Saffuriya. By at least 1754, he installed his eldest son, Salibi, in Tiberias, where Salibi completed construction of its citadel. By the early 1760s, he had installed his third eldest son Ali to Safed with its high hilltop citadel, which he restored. After Sa'd's death in 1761, Daher installed another of his sons, Ahmad, in Sa'd's place at Deir Hanna. This fortress village later became a possession of Ali, by which point Ahmad had gained control over Jabal Ajlun east of the Jordan River. Daher's brother Yusuf was posted in I'billin near Shefa-Amr by 1761, while Shefa-Amr, long under the influence of Daher's uncle's branch of the family, was assigned to Daher's second eldest son Uthman at some point during the decade; (Note: A 1768–1769 inscription credits Uthman al-Daher for constructing its fortress.) before this, Uthman was installed at Kafr Kanna. At Saffuriya, Daher installed his son Sa'id. His younger son, Abbas, oversaw Nazareth.

The Zaydani political and administrative system rested mainly on family bonds. Daher remained the largely undisputed leader of the Zaydani power structure throughout his rule. His absolute power in this structure allowed him to both "establish and maintain an efficient and highly centralized form of control over the entire area under his jurisdiction", according to Cohen. Daher's control of Acre allowed him to control the export trade and profits of the Galilee's cotton. This kept his sons economically dependent on him and there are no indications that the sons attempted to market the cotton from their areas or establish relations with the European merchants. While this was intended to guarantee stability, rebellions liable to damage the sons financially, the sons increasingly accepted such risks. According to Philipp, the family system "was not necessarily ... very reliable and effective", as evidenced by the frequent rebellions of his sons.

=== Rebellions ===
While entrusting his sons with command over these territories was intended to guarantee Daher's grip over the region, his sons eventually struggled against him, and each other, for power and influence. As early as 1753, Uthman rebelled and sought refuge in Jenin, stronghold of the Jarrars, where he attempted to undermine Daher's rule. In 1754, the French merchants reported that the tensions between Daher and his sons were causing instability in the country. In 1761, Sa'd, the eldest Zaydani sheikh and hitherto Daher's key political adviser, conspired with Uthman and the Banu Saqr, with backing from governor Uthman Pasha of Damascus, to eliminate and replace Daher. The plan was detected and Daher turned Uthman against Sa'd, having the former assassinate the latter in exchange for control of Shefa-Amr. Uthman acceded and Daher thus neutralized his last major rival within the Zayadina. Uthman was not awarded with Shefa-Amr on that occasion due to the opposition of the village's inhabitants.

Rebellions intensified throughout the 1760s, as Daher's sons sought to strengthen their positions in anticipation of their aging father's death. Daher's sons had different mothers and often drew on their maternal kinsmen in these disputes. Daher's three eldest sons, Salibi, Uthman, and Ali, all considered themselves their father's successor-in-waiting, and the latter two in particular, were the main drivers of the rebellions for more territorial control. Uthman renewed demands for Shefa-Amr, besieging it with his brothers Ahmad and Sa'd al-Din. When the brothers were repulsed by the local defenders, they barricaded in the citadel of Tiberias, where Salibi mediated on their behalf with Daher. The mediation failed and the brothers gained the backing of the Banu Saqr, but the Bedouins withdrew their support after Daher offerred them tax incentives. Daher afterward had Uthman imprisoned in Haifa for a half year before exiling him to a village near Safed, having deprived him of his weapons, horses and men. Uthman gained the support of Druze and Metawali factions and renewed his rebellion, but Daher defeated him with the support of his other sons Ali and Ahmad. A peace summit at Ras al-Ain ended their conflict. Afterward, Ali revolted against Daher for the latter's successive refusals to cede him Deir Hanna and Deir al-Qassi. He ended his rebellion after Daher mobilized against him, but was given Deir al-Qassi. He and Sa'id (full brothers) then rebelled again when Daher refused to grant Sa'id control of Tur'an and Hittin, but this was settled in mediation and the villages were ceded. Ali's rebellion persisted as he sought control of Deir Hanna and after multiple clashes, Daher ceded control of the village for payment. (Note: According to modern historian Ahmad Hasan Joudah, Uthman launched this rebellion in 1765 and renewed it in May 1766, citing a French consular report dated to 10 May 1766. He dates the peace summit to September 1767, citing a French consular report from 20 September 1767. Ali and Sa'id launched their rebellion later in the same month and make peace with Daher in October 1767 (Joudah cites here a French consular report dated 28 September 1767 and the chronicle of Mikha'il Sabbagh. Amnon Cohen refers to a similar series of events, noting that "three of his [Daher's] sons, supported by the Bedouin tribes, raised the standard of revolt and barricaded themselves in the fortress of Tiberias", but dates this event to 1761, citing French correspondences dated to 19 June 1761, 22 September 1761, and 25 March 1762. In Cohen's version, Daher and his Metawali allies pursued his rebellious sons, leading to a truce in late 1761. At the start of 1762, the same three sons, led by Ali, renewed their revolt. Cohen further notes that another series of rebellions occurred in the later 1760s.)

The rebellions by Daher's sons were nearly always backed by the governor of Damascus, Uthman Pasha, who sought to sustain the internal dissent to weaken Daher. The latter lodged complaints to the imperial government about Uthman Pasha's support for his rebellious sons at least once in 1765. Daher received the support of the governor of Sidon, Muhammad Pasha al-Azm, an opponent of Uthman Pasha who sought to restore the Azms to office in Damascus. While Sidon's support had no practical military value, the support of Daher's nominal superior provided him with official legitimacy amid his family's insurrections. The rebellions of the 1760s also often drew in rival factions among the Metawalis and the Shihab-led Druze of Mount Lebanon.

As Daher was reconciling with the Ottoman authorities in 1774, his sons, "getting on in age themselves, finally wanted power for themselves", according to Philipp, and renewed their rebellions. Ali was the most distinguished of his brothers on the battlefield, having commanded the Zayadina and the Metawalis in numerous engagements on Daher's behalf in the early 1770s. He became the most persistent rebel among his brothers as he aimed to ensure his paramountcy. The rivalry between Ali and Uthman was also intensifying by that point. Their eldest brother, Salibi, had been killed in battle in 1773 and as the two eldest remaining sons of Daher, they were each best positioned as Daher's natural successor for the Zaydani mashaykha (chieftainship). According to Joudah, Uthman "had little chance to succeed", as he had long lost his father's favor and local support save for his alliance with the Banu Saqr; Joudah proposes that Ali's main obstacle was Ahmad. Daher rejected Ali's demand for possession of more villages and was supported by Ahmad during Ali's subsequent rebellion. In the ensuing battle at Rameh on 11 July 1774, Ali defeated them, shooting and wounding Ahmad in the leg and forcing their flight to Deir Hanna. While the two were able to keep Ali at bay, Daher's finances were becoming strained and Ali was able to gain the defection of some of Daher's Maghrebi mercenaries seeking better pay. Sa'id was also challenging his father for further control during this period.

=== Assessment of rebellions ===
Volney, a near contemporary observer, cited the sons' rebellions as a cause of the disorder, family fractiousness, and economic disruption which led to Daher's downfall. The modern scholar Uriel Heyd considers the sons' 1770s rebellions as caused by their "lust for power" and growing "hatred" of their octogenarian father and blamed their failure to support Daher in his final days for his fall. In Cohen's view, the growing power ambitions of Daher's sons never endangered Daher's rule, arguing that until his fall, Daher's sons shed their opposition and rallied around him when confronting external threats. Despite the frequency of the rebellions and their increasing intensity in the 1770s, Daher's sons did not attempt to end his rule or risk his life. The French consul of Sidon summarized the rebellions in 1774:

That is how the wars he waged with his children have always ended: initially, they appear frightening because they are fought with armed force. Yet great care is taken to avoid bloodshed; and—apart from the commotion and noise these wars entail—they are merely family squabbles that paternal love invariably resolves, without ever preventing everyone from instantly uniting at the slightest sign of danger to stand together against the enemies of their house. (Note: Original French quote: C'est ainsi qu'ont toujours fini les guerres qu'il a eues avec ses enfants: elles ont d'abord un air effrayant parce qu'on les soutient à main armée. Mais on n'en est pas moins attentif à ne pas répandre le sang; et à l'exception des mouvements et du bruit que ces guerres occasionnent ce ne sont que des brouilleries de famille, que l'amour paternel vient toujours à bout de terminer; et qui n'empèchent pas qu'à la vue du moindre danger tous ne se réunissent aussitôt pour s'opposer de concert aux ennemis de leur maison)

Cohen affirms that these skirmishes were governed by self-imposed restrictions out of respect for family bonds, citing examples where Ali desisted from pursuing his defeated father at Rameh in 1774 and where soldiers from the opposite side rescued Daher after he had fallen from his horse and then rejoined the battle. While not denying the rebellions were genuine, Cohen notes that Daher likely considered the clashes a way to provide his sons and troops regular combat experience and keep them battle ready. The French vice-consul of Acre in 1774 likened the engagements to a sort of war game.

== Fall ==
=== Suppression of Zaydani rebellion ===
With their fortified villages, private armies and a supportive population, Daher's sons remained ensconced in the Galilee and represented the main obstacle to Jazzar's authority over the province. Jazzar's first priority was subduing the Zayadina and destroying their forts. Daher's son Uthman defected to Jazzar early on in return for keeping control of Shefa-Amr and a promise to appoint him shaykh al-mashayikh (chief of chiefs) of bilad Safad, but his brother Ali, with the support of Daher's other sons Ahmad, Sa'id and Salih, remained incalcitrant and controlled all the Galilee from Tiberias and Safed in the east to Majd al-Krum and Abu Sinan in the west. Ali bribed Muhammad Pasha al-Azm, governor of Damascus, to petition the imperial authorities to sanction his rule, to no avail.

The brothers attempted to block supplies from the countryside reaching Acre, intending to pressure Jazzar into quitting the city, but this had little effect. As Jazzar consolidated his position in the town of Acre, Ali consolidated control over the Galilee from his capital at Safed, and, with his Druze allies, controlled the fortress villages of Tiberias, Majd al-Krum, Abu Sinan, Beit Jann, Rameh, Sajur, Bi'ina, Julis, Yirka, Nahf, Jiddin, Suhmata, Sa'sa', Deir al-Qassi and Deir Hanna. In April 1776, they raided the environs of Acre, harrying its walls and destroying part of its water mills. With his men from Majd al-Krum, Abu Sinan and Deir Hanna, Ali launched an abortive assault on Jazzar's forces at Amqa. By early June 1776, Ali had been defeated in successive battles at Majd al-Krum and Rameh, whose walls were then razed. At this point Jazzar was in control of the western and most of central Galilee, with the Zaydani rebels in control of the area between Deir Hanna, Safed and Tiberias. The first was commanded by Sa'id, the second by Ali and the third by Ahmad.

With 3,000, 5,000 or 12,000 soldiers (according to different estimates) and heavy guns, Jazzar besieged Deir Hanna. During the siege, Jazzar sowed divisions within Zaydani family ranks, having Ali's brother Uthman and his Bedouin supporters join in the siege, and offering safe conduct to Ahmad and Sa'id; five of Daher's sons were reported to have surrendered to Hasan Pasha al-Jaza'iri, who had returned to Acre, in July 1776. Ali refused to capitulate and while the two outer towers of Deir Hanna were captured by Jazzar and reinforcements were blocked, the Zaydani garrison held out against Jazzar's troops for weeks. The garrison included Sa'id, Muhammad Abu Ghurrah (commander of the fortress and Daher's former deputy over Jaffa), Ali's kethuda (chief aide) Yusuf Dabbur (commander of the citadel), and Ali's son Fadil. A contemporary chronicler, Sa'id Effendi, noted the challenge posed by Deir Hanna: "It is not possible to describe (the extent) of the fortification (works) or the strength of the citadel".

The stalemate was broken in late July when Hasan Pasha deployed a heavy cannon and 200 troops to support Jazzar. Cannon fire heavily damaged Deir Hanna's walls, prompting Ali to dispatch the qadi of Safed, Isma'il Effendi (Isma'il Ibn Abd al-Qadir al-Safadi), to negotiate peace with Jazzar on his behalf. Jazzar refused, insisting on direct negotiations, and the shelling of Deir Hanna resumed. Dabbur bypassed Ali and obtained promises of clemency from Jazzar for himself and his men and safe passage for their women and children, in return for surrendering the fortress and their weapons. On 22 July, the gates were opened to Jazzar, though he reneged and imprisoned the commanders. Deir Hanna was afterward razed by Jazzar's order. Contemporary Ottoman and French consular records indicate that Uthman, Sa'id, Ahmad, Sa'd al-Din and Salih and their families, including Ali's son Fadil (Husayn), were in imperial custody and relocated to the capital at Constantinople.

After the fall of the Zayadina's main stronghold at Deir Hanna, whose fortifications were demolished, Safed and Tiberias capitulated. Ali escaped to Mount Lebanon, initially taking refuge in the Shihab family's fort at Niha. Yusuf Shihab soon after evicted Ali to avoid conflict with Jazzar. Afterward, Ali, learning of Jazzar's return to Acre, resumed operations against him, launching attempts to retake Tiberias and Deir Hanna and attacking villages around Safed. He routed an army sent against him by Jazzar at Sa'sa'. The Ottomans were unable to eliminate Ali through conventional means. He had the advantage of mobility and a friendly population in the Galilee's villages, which sustained his revolt. In mid-November 1776, an officer serving Muhammad Pasha of Damascus who had gained entry into Ali's camp struck and killed Ali, sending his head to Constantinople. In the historian Amnon Cohen's words, "With this troublesome thorn [Ali] removed from his side, Jezzār could now breathe far more easily." Ali's assassination marked the end of the Zaydani power in the Galilee, giving Jazzar full control of the Galilee. Remnants of the Zayadina, as well as Muhammad al-Husayn of Sahil Akka, the Metawalis and the Banu Saqr rebelled against Jazzar in late 1778 but the risings were suppressed with assistance of local Druze sheikhs.

=== Imperial careers ===
Several of the sons and grandsons of Daher generally fared well after their exile to Constantinople and held administrative office. At unclear points, Uthman was made governor of the sanjaks of Jeddah of the Hejaz Eyalet in western Arabia and of Bursa (Hüdavendigâr) of the Hüdavendigâr Eyalet in western Anatolia. Ali's sons Husayn, who took up the name 'Fadil' and became a well-known author by the name Enderûnlu Fâzıl, and Hasan, who took up the name 'Kamil' were educated in the Enderun palace. Under Sultan Selim III (r. 1789–1807), Fadil held administrative posts in Rhodes, Aleppo and Erzerum. Ahmad's son Yusuf became a senior official in the imperial Translation Office (founded in 1821).

== Architectural legacy ==
The Zayadina built fortresses, watchtowers, warehouses, and khans (caravanserais) throughout the Galilee and in Haifa. These buildings improved the domestic administration and general security of the Galilee. Today, many are in a state of disrepair and remain outside the scope of Israel's cultural preservation laws. The researcher Ziad Daher, a descendant of Daher, catalogued sixty sites attributed to the Zayadina. The development of northern Palestine's key towns, namely Tiberias, Nazareth, Acre and Haifa, all of which had been small and decaying villages prior to Daher's rule, fueled their revival and socioeconomic rise, which put them on par with Nablus, hitherto Palestine's principal commercial center. The restoration and refortification of Acre and the establishment of the secondary harbor town of Haifa significantly strengthened the Galilee's ties with the Mediterranean world.

The Zayadina's strong reliance on the rural populace of the Galilee for their military and political power manifested in their fortification of friendly villages across the region, especially Deir Hanna, which together with their nearby hometown of Arraba effectively formed the family's rural capital. The family fortified their other key Galilee strongholds, Tiberias, Shefa-Amr, Safed and Saffuriya. Other supportive villages were fortified in the Zaydani period, with contemporary sources noting Majd al-Krum and Rameh both possessed walls with towers before these were demolished in 1776 and oral tradition in Majd al-Krum attributing the construction of the old village to Zaydani rule. Likewise, local tradition in nearby Sha'ab credits the construction of parts of the village's old core to Daher al-Umar's rule. Other Galilee forts or fortified villages under the family's control included Suhmata and Jiddin. These were already fortified in the early 18th century and controlled by local strongmen before Daher extended his control over them, though Daher is credited for some of these villages' fortification by 19th-century observers (or their local informants). In the case of Jiddin, a 1990s architectural survey credits Daher for later 18th-century construction work, attributing an earlier 18th-century building phase to another local potentate (the Husayn family).

Building works of the Zayadina
| Name | Image | Condition | Location | Type | Coordinates | Notes |
|---|---|---|---|---|---|---|
| Walls of Acre | | Partly ruined | Acre | Fortification | 32°55′26.7″N 35°4′14.8″E | Daher al-Umar's extant contributions, completed in 1750, are mostly on the northeasten section (pictured). |
| Burj al-Sultan (Sultan's Tower) | | Preserved | Acre | Fortification | 32°55′17.3″N 35°4′17″E | Restored by Daher al-Umar |
| Khan al-Shawarda | | Preserved | Acre | Commercial | 32°55′18.6″N 35°4′16.6″E | Repurposed and restored by Daher al-Umar |
| Khan al-Shuna | | Preserved | Acre | Commercial | 32°55′11.9″N 35°4′5.3″E | Restored by Daher al-Umar in 1764 |
| Suq al-Abyad (White Market) | | Reconstructed | Acre | Commercial | 32°55′22.2″N 35°4′16.9″E | Originally built by Daher al-Umar; present structure mainly built by Sulayman Pasha in 1815 |
| Al-Muallaq Mosque | | Mostly preserved | Acre | Mosque | 32°55′22.2″N 35°4′7.8″E | Former synagogue reconstructed into mosque by Daher al-Umar in 1748 |
| Deir Hanna Palace | | Partly ruined | Deir Hanna | Residence | 32°51′44.8″N 35°21′51.8″E | Built by Sa'd al-Umar (1730s–1761) |
| Fortifications of Deir Hanna | | Mostly ruined | Deir Hanna | Fortification | 32°51′44.9″N 35°21′50.5″E | Inner enclosure walls (pictured) and their original twelve towers built by Sa'd al-Umar (1730s–1761). Daher al-Umar built the outer walls (1740s–1775) and their two towers and Ali al-Daher (1760s–1776) built two additional, detached outer towers. |
| Old Mosque of Deir Hanna | | Mostly preserved | Deir Hanna | Mosque | 32°51′45.6″N 35°21′50.8″E | Founded by Sa'd al-Umar in 1732–1733 (interior pictured) |
| Haifa al-Jadida (New Haifa) | | No longer extant; reconstructed | Haifa | | 32°48′57″N 35°0′8″E | Daher al-Umar demolished Old Haifa and built New Haifa (also called al-Imara al-Jadida) about 3 kilometers (1.9 mi) to the southeast. The new construction became the foundation of the modern city. Daher's architectural contributions to Haifa are no longer extant, but included the Burj al-Salam tower (demolished in 1970s), the Saraya (see next), and the walls and towers (as can be seen in this painting of Haifa from 1839) |
| Saraya of Haifa (Governor's House) | | No longer extant; current site of Sail Tower | Haifa | Residence | 32°48′58.4″N 35°0′9.2″E | Built by Daher al-Umar. Demolished in 1949 (ruins of the site pictured, 1957) |
| Fortifications of I'billin | | Mostly ruined | I'billin | Fortification | 32°49′21.9″N 35°11′36.2″E | Founded by Yusuf al-Umar (1760s). Extant, ruined wall pictured. |
| Old Mosque of I'billin | | Reconstructed | I'billin | Mosque | 32°49′22.1″N 35°11′32.6″E | Originally founded by Yusuf al-Umar (1760s), present structure is modern reconstruction |
| Harbaj | None | No longer extant | Kfar Hasidim | Fortification | 32°44′51.7″N 35°5′39.7″E | Village fortified by Daher al-Umar in 1748; traces of the walls were visible in mid-19th century. By 1935, the remnant walls were demolished and the stones removed. No visible traces remain. |
| Saraya of Nazareth | | Preserved, restored | Nazareth | Residence | 32°42′13.7″N 35°17′54.2″E | Built by Daher al-Umar in 1730s or 1740s. |
| Citadel of Safed | | Mostly ruined | Safed | Fortification | 32°58′8″N 35°29′41.8″E | Most of the structure was restored/reconstructed along its original Crusader-period lines by Ali al-Daher, who controlled Safed in 1760s–1776. Severely damaged by 1837 earthquake, stone robbing and overgrowth since. Traces of citadel remain. |
| Tower of Saffuriya | | Preserved | Saffuriya | Fortification | 32°45′11.9″N 35°16′44.9″E | Upper floor and doorway reconstructed by Daher al-Umar or his son Ahmad al-Daher |
| Saray (Fortress) of Shefa-Amr | | Preserved | Shefa-Amr | Fortification | 32°48′19.4″N 35°10′7.1″E | Built by Uthman al-Daher in 1768–1769. Earlier phase may have been patronized by Ali ibn Salih al-Zaydani in early 18th century. |
| Burj (Tower) of Shefa-Amr | | Partly ruined | Shefa-Amr | Fortification | 32°48′8.1″N 35°9′56.9″E | Built by the Zayadina as part of their fortification works in Shefa-Amr. |
| Old Mosque of Shefa-Amr | | Reconstructed | Shefa-Amr | Mosque | 32°48′20.3″N 35°10′9.4″E | Founded by the Zayadina in 1761–1762. Most of the present structure is a modern construction. Extant contributions by the Zayadina include the prayer hall and vaulted portico. |
| Tower of Qamun | | Trace ruins | Tel Yokneam | Fortification | 32°39′50.4″N 35°6′29.9″E | Built by Daher al-Umar |
| Zahiri or Omari Mosque of Tiberias | | Mostly preserved, dilapidated | Tiberias | Mosque | 32°47′16.1″N 35°32′28.1″E | Built by Daher al-Umar, probably in the 1740s. The central dome was rebuilt in late 19th or early 20th centuries during restoration work, which also added three domes over the portico. |
| Sea Mosque of Tiberias | | Mostly preserved | Tiberias | Mosque | 32°47′11″N 35°32′36″E | Most likely built during Daher al-Umar's rule. |
| Walls of Tiberias | | Partly ruined | Tiberias | Fortification | 32°47′4.5″N 35°32′38.7″E | Built by Daher al-Umar in the 1730s and 1740s. It is unclear to what extent they incorporated the older (16th century) walls built by Joseph Nasi. Large sections were destroyed in 1837 earthquake but much of the walls survived into early 20th century. By 1990s, few remnants were extant. |
| Citadel of Tiberias | | Partly ruined | Tiberias | Fortification | 32°47′24.5″N 35°32′27″E | Built by Salibi al-Daher in 1754. |
| Zaydani Mosque of Tibna | | Preserved/restored | Tibna | Mosque | 32°28′32″N 35°43′41.5″E | Built by Ahmad al-Daher in 1771–1772. It was restored in 1997–2003 but retains its original structure and layour and much of its composition. |
| Zaydani Castle of Tibna | | Mostly ruined | Tibna | Fortification | 32°28′40.5″N 35°43′38″E | A small fort built by Ahmad al-Daher in the early 1770s. It was extant in the 1930s but is largely ruined today. |
| Jiddin Fortress | | Mostly preserved | Yehi'am Fortress National Park | Fortification | 32°59′39.2″N 35°13′17.4″E | Originally a Crusader fortress, most of the present structure dates to 18th century. The sheikhs of the Husayn family and Daher al-Umar are credited for the 18th-century construction phases. |

== Descendants ==
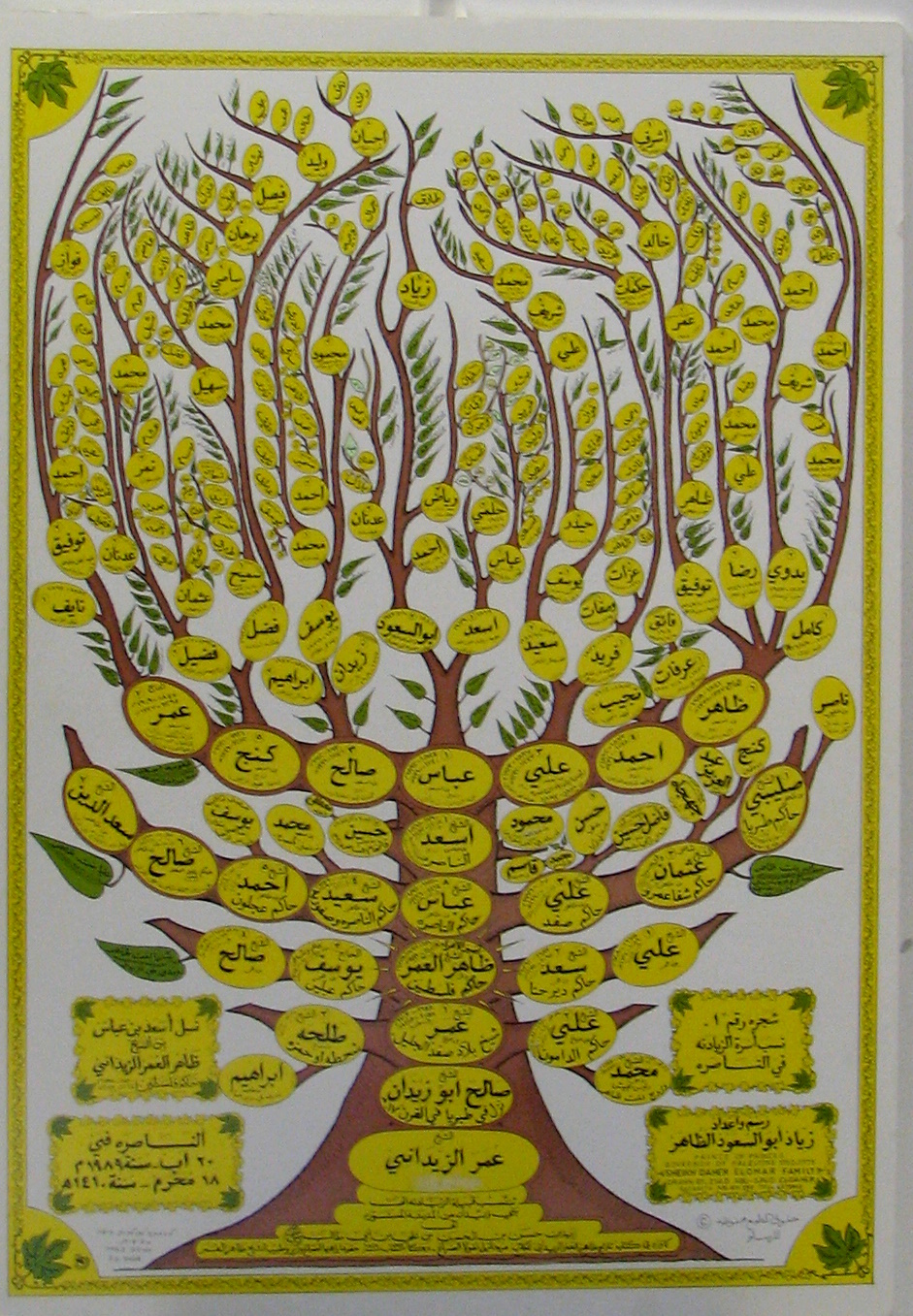
Family tree (in Arabic) of Abbas al-Daher of Nazareth, Daher al-Umar's son, up to modern descendants

=== Bashir al-Zaydani family of Haifa ===
In Haifa in the 19th and early 20th centuries, the al-Bashir al-Zaydani family, descendants of the Zayadina, were influential among Haifa's ulema (Muslim scholarly class) and its sharia (Islamic law) court. They resided in the eponymous al-Bashir alley in the eastern neighborhood of Haifa.

Three members of the family served as the government-appointed head judge (na'ib of the town in the 1860s: Abdallah in 1860, His brother Muhammad (Abu al-Nur) in 1861, and Abdallah's son Hasan in 1862 and/or 1865–1868. Hasan was later appointed head judge of Shefa-Amr in 1889–1890. Another of Abdallah's sons, Salah, was appointed tax collector of Acre in 1889. Another member of the family with the name Abdallah was posted as head judge in the Beqaa Valley district in 1914. Both Abdallah and Abu al-Nur wielded significant influence among Haifa's Muslim community. When Abu al-Nur banned the British vice consul from meeting with the town's Christians, the British succeeded in lobbying the Ottomans to depose him for Abdallah, who was honored by the Prince of Wales in 1862. Other prominent members were Abdallah's brother As'ad, who left a considerable real estate fortune in 1871, and Mahmud al-Zaydani (fl. 1870s.

The Bashirs experienced financial difficulties in the 1870s. The heirs of Abdallah and Abu al-Nur sold the family's main asset, a waterpowered flour mill, in 1874 to local Christian merchants of the Khuri and Mudawwar families. By the 1880s, they had lost most of their properties. Nevertheless, by dint of their lineage and marriage alliances, the Bashir al-Zaydani retained their honorary status in Haifa as wujuh (dignitaries) until the end of Ottoman rule in 1917.

=== Descendants in Nazareth and the Galilee ===
Daher's son Abbas, whose mother was a Nazarene, remained in Nazareth after his father's elimination and the suppression of the subsequent Zaydani rebellion. There, he met with Napoleon during his invasion of Palestine in 1799 and they discussed allying against Jazzar. After the latter repulsed Napoleon's siege of Acre that year, Abbas and his brother Salih, who had since returned from Constantinople, left with the French and moved to Paris. Abbas returned to Nazareth, where he died in 1811. His son, Husayn, was appointed mutasallim (governor) of Nazareth in 1850.

Descendants of Abbas, or more specifically the seven sons of Abbas's other son As'ad (Abbas, Ali, Kanj, Salih, Ahmad and Daher) make up the present family in Nazareth. Ali served as the third mayor of Nazareth in 1889–1892. He and his brother Abbas held the military title of agha. Their brother Kanje, a grain merchant, held a seat on Nazareth's municipal council. The Beverly Hills-based Palestinian American real estate developer Mohamed Hadid, father of models Gigi, Bella and Anwar, claims descent from Daher through his Nazarene mother's side.

The patrilineal descendants of the Zayadina in modern-day Israel, including Nazareth, use the surnames 'Daher' (Note: Variant transliterations are 'Dhaher' (pl. 'Dhawahreh'/'Dhawahri', 'Zaher' or 'Zahir' (pl. 'Zawahirah')) in honor of Daher or 'Zidani' (pl. 'Ziyadineh'). (Note: Variant transliteration is 'Zaydani' (pl. 'Zayadina').) Descendants of Daher's son Sa'id acquired lands and settled in Deir Hanna. Other descendants were reported living in Kafr Manda as early as 1852. After the depopulation of Damun by the Israelis in the 1948 war, the descendants of Ali ibn Salih (Daher's uncle) there partly relocated to Tamra, the other part joining their kinsmen in Kafr Manda. Members of the family were also resident in Bi'ina. According to Claude Reignier Conder, in the early 1870s, a Zaydani elder in Bi'ina had provided Conder with the list of the sites developed by the Zayadina, the names of the builders and the approximate years of their construction.

=== Barudi family of Damascus ===
The Barudi family, members of the Damascene elite in the late 19th and early 20th centuries, are direct patrilineal descendants of Daher al-Umar. The patriarch of the family, Muhammad, was a grandson of Daher who took refuge with the Zayadina's old friends, the Shuwayki family of Damascus, to escape the Ottomans' pursuit of the Zayadina in the immediate aftermath of Daher's death. Sa'id al-Shuwayki secured Muhammad work in a gunpowder factory in Damascus and he eventually became a successful operator. The family thereafter became known as 'al-Barudi' (the gunpowder [maker]). Muhammad's great-grandson, Fakhri al-Barudi (1877–1966), was a prominent Syrian nationalist politician and poet during the French Mandate period (1920–1946).

=== Descendants in Jabal Ajlun ===
After the fall of Daher, Zaydani power Jabal Ajlun collapsed, with the Sharayda family reasserting its control over Tibna, the seat of the Kura district. The Zu'biya clan aided the efforts of Jazzar to suppress the Zayadina in this same district. This assistance allowed the Zu'biyya to establish their local power in Ramtha. A remnant of the Zayadina in Jabal Ajlun is the Zayadna (or Zayadin) family of Raimun.

A member of the Zayadina, Yousef Abbas, settled in Amman in Transjordan in the late 17th century (according to the family's oral tradition). Around three decades later, his family migrated to Irbid in Jabal Ajlun and were thenceforth called 'al-Tal' (the Hill). The family was named al-Tal because in Amman they had lived close to the town's citadel, which was built on a hill or tal. Yousef's four sons, Hussein, Hassan, Abd al-Rahman, and Abd al-Rahim and their modern-day descendants continue to use the surname al-Tal, sometimes with 'Yousef' as an antecedent. From Irbid, members of the al-Tal family served in various Ottoman governmental positions in the 19th and early 20th centuries. The family was involved in the establishment of the Emirate of Transjordan, a British protectorate under the nominal rule of Emir Abdullah and played important roles in its government. Prominent family members include a general of Jordan's Arab Legion, Abdullah al-Tal, and Jordanian Prime Minister Wasfi al-Tal and his father, the poet Mustafa Wahbi Tal.

== Family tree ==
Genealogical tree of the Zayadina

Zaydan
Salih
Ali (fl. 1704 – c. 1723) | Umar (d. 1706) | Hamza (fl. 1708)
Muhammad (d. 1743) | Ayyub | Shammah | Sa'd (d. 1761) | Yusuf (fl. 1743 – c. 1761) | Salih (d. 1738) | Daher (d. 1775)
Karim (d. 1775) | Nijma | Salibi (d. 1773) | Uthman | Ali (d. 1776) | Sa'id | Ahmad | Sa'd al-Din | Salih (fl. 1775 – c. 1799 | Abbas (d. 1810)
Nasir | Abd al-Aziz | Kanj | Jahjah | Fadil (d. 1810) | Hasan | Muhammad | Yusuf | As'ad | Husayn (fl. 1850)
Abbas | Ali (fl. 1898–1892) | Kanj (d. 1930) | Daher | Salih | Ahmad

== Bibliography ==
- Agmon, Iris (1996). Family and Court: Legal Culture and Modernity in Late Ottoman Palestine. Syracuse University Press. ISBN 9780815630623.
- Cohen, Amnon (1973). Palestine in the 18th Century: Patterns of Government and Administration. Jerusalem: The Magnes Press. ISBN 978-0-19-647903-3.
- Conder, Claude Reignier (1878). Tent Work in Palestine. A Record of Discovery and Adventure, Volume 1. London R. Bentley & Son.
- Erdman, Michael (2024). "Fair Boys and Wicked Ladies: Peoples of the Balkans in the Works of Enderunlu Fazil Bey". In Todd, Ines Ascarik; Smajic, Aid (eds.). Travellers in Ottoman Lands II The Balkans, Anatolia and Beyond. Archaeopress. pp. 266–298. ISBN 9781803278605.
- Firro, Kais (1992). A History of the Druzes. Vol. 1. Brill. ISBN 9004094377.
- Joudah, Ahmad Hasan (1987). Revolt in Palestine in the Eighteenth Century: The Era of Shaykh Zahir Al-'Umar. Kingston Press. ISBN 9780940670112.
- Joudah, Ahmad Hasan (2013). Revolt in Palestine in the Eighteenth Century: The Era of Shaykh Zahir al-Umar (Second ed.). Gorgias Press. ISBN 978-1-4632-0002-2.
- Kanje, Fadel (2016). Transhumances interculturelles d'un Arabe de Nazareth (in French). Paris: l'Hartmann. ISBN 978-2-343-10202-3.
- Mazarib, Tomer (2021). From Desert to Town: The Integration of Bedouin into Arab Fellahin Villages. Eastbourne: Sussex Academic Press. ISBN 9781789761535.
- Moubayed, Sami (2026). The Life and Memoirs of Fakhri al-Barudi. Cairo: The American University in Cairo Press. ISBN 978-1-649-03476-2.
- Peake, Frederick Gerard (1934). A History of Trans-Jordan and its Tribes, Vol. 2. Amman.
- Petersen, Andrew (2001). A Gazetteer of Buildings in Muslim Palestine (British Academy Monographs in Archaeology). Vol. 1. Oxford University Press. ISBN 978-0-19-727011-0.
- Philipp, Thomas (2001). Acre: The Rise and Fall of a Palestinian City, 1730–1831. Columbia University Press. ISBN 9780231506038.
- Rafeq, Abdul-Karim (1966). The Province of Damascus, 1723–1783. Beirut: Khayats. OCLC 26512897.
- Razi, Zvi; Braun, Eliot (1992). "The Lost Crusader Castle of Tiberias". In Kedar, B. Z. (ed.). The Horns of Hattin. London: Variorum. pp. 216–229. ISBN 0-86078-334-0.
- Reichmuth, Stefan (2009). The World of Murtada Al-Zabidi: 1732-91 Life, Networks and Writings. Oxford and Exeter: Gibb Memorial Trust. ISBN 978-0-906094-60-0.
- Robinson, E.; Smith, E. (1856). Later Biblical Researches in Palestine and adjacent regions: A Journal of Travels in the year 1852. London: John Murray.
- Sharon, M. (2004). Corpus Inscriptionum Arabicarum Palaestinae, D-F. Leiden and Boston: Brill. ISBN 978-90-04-13197-2.
- Silberman, Neil Asher (1996). "Tobacco Pipes, Cotton Prices and Progress". In Orser, Charles E. (ed.). Images of the Recent Past: Readings in Historical Archaeology. Walnut Creek, California: Altamira Press. pp. 462–477. ISBN 978-0-7619-9142-7.
- Srouji, Elias S. (2003). Cyclamens from Galilee: Memoirs of a Physician from Nazareth. iUniverse, Inc. ISBN 9780595303045.
- Yazbak, Mahmoud (1995). "Strife among the Social Elite in Haifa 1870–1914, the Traditional Elite versus a New Rising Elite–Based upon the Sijill of the Shari'a Court". In Panzac, Daniel (ed.). Histoire économique et sociale de l'Empire ottoman et de la Turquie (1326–1960). Leuven and Paris: Peeters Publishers. pp. 539–554. ISBN 90-6831-799-7.
- Yazbak, Mahmoud (1998). Haifa in the Late Ottoman Period, A Muslim Town in Transition, 1864–1914. Leiden, Boston and Koln: Brill. ISBN 978-90-04-11051-9.
- Yazbak, M. (2013). "The Politics of Trade and Power: Dahir al-Umar and the Making of Early Modern Palestine". Journal of the Economic and Social History of the Orient. 56 (4–5): 696–736. doi:10.1163/15685209-12341338. S2CID 154242949.
- Yitzhak, Ronen (2012). Abdullah al-Tall, Arab Legion Officer: Arab Nationalism and Opposition to the Hashemite Regime. Apollo Books. ISBN 9781845194086.
