= Tibna, Jordan =

Tibna Tebneh or Tubna
- Location within Jordan
- Coordinates: 32°28′32″N 35°43′41″E
- PAL: 218/209
- Country: Jordan
- District: Koura
- Governorate: Irbid Governorate
- Elevation: 615 m (2,018 ft)

Population (2015 census)
  - Total: 9,494

Tibna (Arabic: تبنة; also transliterated Tebneh, Tibne or Tobna) is a town in northwestern Jordan. It is administratively part of the Deir Abi Sa'id municipality of the Koura District in the Irbid Governorate.

Tibna was historically one of the centers of the Koura region of the Jabal Ajlun highlands. The village was the seat of Zaydani rule in Jabal Ajlun in the early 1770s under Ahmad al-Daher, who founded a mosque and small fort there, which remain extant. Afterward, the village became the seat of the Sharayda sheikhs, who were the largest landowners of Tibna into the late 19th or early 20th centuries.

== Geography ==
Tibna is located 14 kilometers (8.7 mi) southwest of Irbid. Its old core, lying on the al-Alali hilltop, has an average elevation of 615 meters (2,018 ft). In modern times, it has expanded along its eastern and northerns sides. The hilltop to the village's southeast, Jabal al-Ajami, stands 900 meters (3,000 ft) above sea level. The surrounding area is characterized by hills and extensive olive groves.

Within 3 kilometers (1.9 mi) of Tibna are the villages of Inba, Kafr al-Maa and al-Ashrafiya. All form part of the Deir Abi Saeed municipality and historically this cluster villages form the Koura region of Jabal Ajlun between Jordan's thickest forests and the jagged terrain east of the Jordan Valley. The forest southeast of Tibna "is probably the best preserved and largest stand of oak" in Jordan, according to architect and researcher Ammar Khammash. Tibna owed its strategic place as a regional stronghold by its location on a hill surrounded by deep valleys separating it from its surroundings on the one hand and its equidistance between the series of villages lying on the first flat lands to its west and the other mountain villages lying to its east. The valley to its northeast, Wadi Ain Sirin, drops 200 meters (660 ft) below Tibna and the valley to its southwest, Wadi al-Naha, is on a 140 meters (460 ft)-decline from the village.

The topography severely hinders access to the village, with no road between it and the close-by village of Inba (2 kilometers (1.2 mi) away). Traveling between the area villages to Tibna requires circumenting the Wadi Ain Sirin, which can create a roughly 20 kilometers (12 mi) detour. There are no modern roads within the village but by 1986, the village had witnessed significant development, with modern concrete buildings overtaking and far outnumbering the village's old stone building; much of the growth was concentrated on the southeast of the village and encroaching on Tibna's ancient olive groves.

== History ==
=== Ottoman period ===
In 1596 it appeared in the Ottoman tax registers, situated in the nahiya (subdistrict) of Kura, part of the Sanjak of Ajlun. It had 30 households and 7 bachelors; all Muslim. The villagers paid a fixed tax-rate of 25% on agricultural products; including wheat (1400 a.), barley (800 a.), olive trees (1349 a.), and goats and bee-hives (650 a.). The total tax was 4,549 akçe.

In the 18th century, Tibna was the seat of the Kura district. It was controlled by the sheikhs of the Rashdan family, who ruled through the provision of hospitality and force, hosting and feeding guests in their madafa and surrounding themselves with ruffians who enforced their authority. In the middle of the century, the Rashdan were ousted by the Sharayda, a family of no special standing at that time, though the oral tradition cited by Frederick Gerard Peake in the early 20th century places both families as branches of the Hammad clan. In this tradition, the progenitor of the Hammad hailed from the Wadi Hammad valley (hence his name) near al-Karak and moved to Tibna due to a blood feud. The Sharayda leader who took over the village from the Rashdan was Abd al-Nabi, who the tradition describes as intelligent and ambitious. In the ensuing period, authority over the Kura became divided between the Sharayda in Tibna and the Rashdan in Kafr al-Maa.

In c. 1770 or 1771, the Zayadina under Ahmad al-Daher and his Bedouin allies from the Subayh tribe took over the Jabal Ajlun highlands and ousted its local strongman (assumingly from the Sharayda family). The Sharayda–Rashdan rivalry enabled Ahmad to impose his authority in Ajlun's Kura district, according to the oral tradition. The governor of Damascus, to whose jurisdiction Jabal Ajlun belonged, recognized Ahmad's governance of the district in 1774 in a peace gesture to his father, Daher al-Umar, the ruler of northern Palestine. Ahmad established his seat in Tibna, constructing there a small fort (the 'Zaydani Castle'), which remains extant but ruined, and the old mosque (the 'Zaydani Mosque').

After the fall of Daher and the Zayadina in 1775–1776, a grandson of Abd al-Nabi, Sharayda ibn Raba', retook Tibna and ousted his Rashdan rivals from the Kura. In a 1838 list of villages by Eli Smith, Tibna was confirmed as the seat of the Kura district and its inhabitants were recorded as Muslims and Greek Orthodox Christians. The Kura was one of eight such districts, or communes (nahiyas in Jabal Ajlun in the 19th century and the Sharaydas were its local lords. Their principal rivals by then were the Furayhat family in the neighboring district of Ajlun, the largest or most populuous district of Jabal Ajlun.

In the late 19th century Tibna was the largest village in Jabal Ajlun, with 280 households. Its lands were substantial, among the most extensive in the region, and were largely planted with olive groves. Olive oil and grape products, mainly raisins and dibs (molasses), were its chief cash crops. The lands of Tibna were owned either communally or individually. The 1883 property registrations in Tibna included lists of houses, musha (communal) lands, olive trees on musha lands and small plots and gardens. The lands lying east of Tibna included 10,914 olive trees. The trees were owned by individuals but the lands on which they were planted were communal. The village homes were either earthen or built of stone, typically consisting of a single large room and a roof built on large arches. Above the animal pens were large platforms where most family life was conducted.

The Sharayda family was the largest landowning family of Tibna. The grain lands were communal and the ownership were largely held by members of the Sharayda family. The largest shares were owned by the preeminent leader of the family, Abd al-Qadir Effendi Yusuf and his nephew Muflih Effendi Jabr. Abd al-Qadir's brothers Talal and Sudi (who co-owned their shares with a non-family member Ali ibn Abd al-Rahman), Jurdan and Klaib (who co-owned with non-family members brothers Awad and Muhammad al-Khalil and Muhammad ibn Khamis) and Mahmud and his son Ibrahim owned sizable Tibna lands, as well as their cousins Fandi, Salih, Mithqal, Fari, Nayib and Ali (sons of Abd al-Qadir's brother Dhiyab) and Dhiyab and Mudhib (sons of Dhiyab's son Faisal) and Sharayda ibn Ruba' (another nephew of Abd al-Qadir). Eighteen percent of ownership shares in the olive musha lands and seven percent of the olive trees were held by individual women.

In 1890, Gottlieb Schumacher noted that Tibna was the capital of the Kura district and its regional importance was on par with that of Daraa, capital of the Hauran region northeast of Jabal Ajlun. It had a "very commanding" position on the hilltop, from which the village homes had a "fine view". The village was surrounded by "extensive vineyards and olive-groves" and its population included a 1,000 men.

=== Modern period ===
By the early 20th century, several settlements had arisen in the vast lands of Tibna, which were then subdivided among the new villages (it is possible such settlements existed in the late 19th century but they do not appear in the tax records of the 1880s–1890s). Among the clans or tribes Peake listed as resident in Tibna in the early 20th century were the Sharayda, Bani Amir, and Bani al-Dawmi.

In the 1961 Jordanian census, Tibna had a population of 994.

== Historical landmarks ==
The "historic core" of Tibna has been "engulfed" by the village's urban growth from the 1980s–2000s, according to archaeologist Ammar Khammash. The historic landmarks of the village are the Zaydani Mosque, the ruined Zaydani Castle, the Sharayda family's partly ruined al-Alali Mansion and the remains of the old walls. On a hilltop east of the village is the al-Ajami holy tree. The village also has a cemetery for members of the Zayadina. Buried in the cemetery were two other saintly Muslim figures, Sheikh Sa'id and Sheikh Mas'ud. Schumacher noted that their tombs at the time were simple graves. The tombs were mentioned in by a researcher (al-Shuqayri) in 1988 but due to the absence of inscriptions or adequate oral traditions, the tombs can no longer be identified.

=== Zaydani Castle ===
The Zaydani castle built by Ahmad al-Daher is on the northern, upper side of the village. As of 1986, it was in ruins, the remains consisting of two rooms with cross vaults. The stairway that led to the roof also remained.

=== Wall ===
Tibna was formerly enclosed by defensive walls, probably dating to the 18th century. The walls had two gates, one near the Zaydani Castle and the other on the south end of the village. A remnant of the wall remains on the east side of Tibna.

=== Zaydani Mosque ===
The Zaydani Mosque (Masjid al-Zaydani), also called the Old Mosque (Masjid al-Qadim), was constructed in 1771 or 1772, according to the mosque's modern inscription (there is known original inscription). In 1980 its dome collapsed but the mosque continued to be in use. Between 1997 and 2003 the building and its enclosed courtyard were restored under the supervision of Professor R. Daher.

The mosque sits on the rocky southern edge of Tibna's upper core. Its high position and colored stone distinguish it from its urban surroundings and make it visible from a distance. Beneath the mosque is a natural cave nearly equal in size to the building area and which is accessible from the courtyard of a home northeast of the mosque (the cave area was formerly owned by Musa Tojeh). The building measures 155 square meters (1,670 ft^{2}) and has a square plan. Its entrance is on the north and the interior is divided into four bays, the southeastern topped by the dome and the other three by cross vaults. A staircase in the northwest corner leads to the rooftop.

It is built of mid-sized, yellowish-red, roughly-dressed marly limestone blocks with sporadic presence of small basaltic stones. The blocks are laid in eighteen to twenty-five courses (depending on the side). After the 1997–2003 restoration it is difficult to discern which portions of the masonry date to the 18th century and which were reassembled in the restoration. A small alcove resting on two corbels projects from the upper east side of the mosque. In the interior, the restoration covered the cross vaults and inner dome with white plaster, while the stone masonry of the inner walls and pillars remain visible.

=== Al-Alali Mansion of the Sharayda Family ===
The al-Alali mansion of the Sharayda family occupies the highest point of Tibna. It was built by Klaib Yusuf al-Sharayda probably between 1880 and 1910. It is built in the late Ottoman Levantine style, with its use of shaped stones for all its elevations and cross vaults and large windows. It is architecturally most similar to the palace homes of this period in Nazareth and Nablus. It was built of limestone in at least two phases, its lower story older than the upper. The lower story contains a madafa (guesthouse) and a musalla (prayer room). The musalla, measuring 60 square meters (650 ft^{2}), has a mihrab (prayer niche) and an inscription in there indicates it was built before the mansion, in c. 1855. The mansion was in a ruinous state as of 2003, its eastern section having collapsed due to heavy rain in the 1970s and the other damages occurring gradually due to a lack of oversight and precautionary measures, as well as botched beautification attempts.

=== Al-Ajami ===
On a hilltop east of Tibna was the al-Ajami maqam (saintly person's tomb). In 1890, Schumacher noted it was a simple structure. Its current state is unclear. Still standing at the site, as of 2003, was the sacred tree of al-Ajami.

== Bibliography ==
- Bakhit, Adnan; Pascual, Jean-Paul; Mundy, Martha (2014) [2013]. "The Early Ottoman Era". Atlas of Jordan: History, Territories and Society. Beirut: Presses de l'Ifpo. pp. 188–197. ISBN 978-2-35159-438-4.
- Cohen, Amnon (1973). Palestine in the 18th Century: Patterns of Government and Administration. Jerusalem: The Magnes Press. ISBN 978-0-19-647903-3.
- Hütteroth, W.-D.; Abdulfattah, K. (1977). Historical Geography of Palestine, Transjordan and Southern Syria in the Late 16th Century. Erlanger Geographische Arbeiten, Sonderband 5. Erlangen, Germany: Vorstand der Fränkischen Geographischen Gesellschaft. ISBN 3-920405-41-2.
- Joudah, Ahmad Hasan (2013). Revolt in Palestine in the Eighteenth Century: The Era of Shaykh Zahir al-Umar (Second ed.). Gorgias Press. ISBN 978-1-4632-0002-2.
- Mundy, Martha; Smith, Richard Saumarez (2007). Governing Property, Making the Modern State: Law, Administration and Production in Ottoman Syria. London and New York: I. B. Tauris. ISBN 978-1-84511-291-2.
- Peake, Frederick Gerard (1934). A History of Trans-Jordan and its Tribes, Vol. 2. Amman.
- Philipp, Thomas (2001). Acre: The Rise and Fall of a Palestinian City, 1730–1831. Columbia University Press. ISBN 9780231506038.
- Rogan, Eugene (1999). Frontiers of the State in the Late Ottoman Empire. Cambridge: Cambridge University Press. ISBN 0-521-66312-1.
- Schumacher, Gottlieb (1890). Northern Ajlun "Within the Decapolis". London: Palestine Exploration Fund.
- Smith, Eli (1841). "Lists of Arabic Names of Places in Palestine and the Adjacent Regions". In Robinson, E.; Smith, E. (eds.). Biblical Researches in Palestine, Mount Sinai and Arabia Petraea: A Journal of Travels in the year 1838. Vol. 3. Boston: Crocker & Brewster. pp. 112–196.
