= Kufr 'Awan =

Kufr 'Awan كفرعوان
- Town
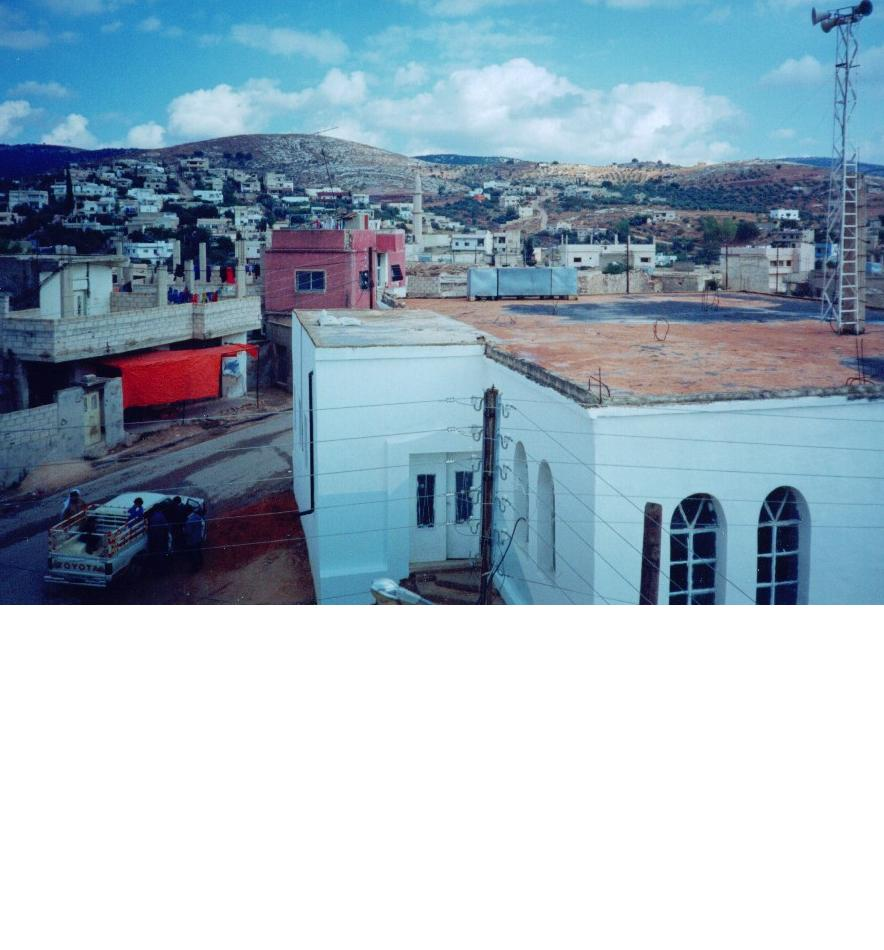
- The town of Kufr 'Awan

- Location within Jordan
- Coordinates: 32°25′0″N 35°41′0″E
- PAL: 215/203
- Country: Jordan
- Province: Irbid Governorate
- Department: Koura
- Elevation: 620 m (2,030 ft)

Population (2015)
  - Total: 13,056
- Time zone: GMT +2
  - Summer (DST): +3
- Area code: +(962)2
- Website: http://visit-kfarawan.simplesite.com/

Kufr 'Awan (كفرعوان in Arabic) is a village of Kourah Department, Irbid Governorate, Jordan. It is one of the five metropolitan districts of Barqash.

== Geography ==
The village of Kafr Awan is located between four villages: Jdita and Kafr Abel from the south and southwest, and Beit Ides and Kafrrakeb from the north. And it is 73 km from the capital, Amman. The town of Kafr Awan is located in the middle, which makes it close to the valley, and on the other hand, it is close to the mountain area in the Ajloun governorate, which is an old town, meaning Kafr Awan, meaning medium farms, and it enjoys the beauty of its nature, especially in the summer and spring.

== History ==
There are three archaeological places here: kherbet fatteh, Al kharjah, and Attantoor which are listed on the archaeological map of Jordan.

The town overlooks the famous ancient Roman city of Pella more known as " Tabaqet Fahel", which was one of the ten cities that made up the Decapolis union.

The Battle of Fahl between the Rashidun Khalifate and the Roman Empire took place in this area. Just below the ancient site is a mosque which commemorates the death of one of the companions of the prophet Mohammed, who fell in the battle in January 635 CE.

In 1596, during the Ottoman Empire, Kufr 'Awan was noted in the census as being located in the nahiya of Kure in the liwa of Ajloun. It had a population of 16 Muslim households and 7 Muslim bachelors. They paid a fixed tax-rate of 25% on various agricultural products, including wheat, barley, olive trees/vineyards/fruit trees, goats and beehives, in addition to occasional revenues; a total of 14,000 akçe.

In 1838 Kufr 'Awan's inhabitants were predominantly Sunni Muslims.

The Jordanian census of 1961 found 1,480 inhabitants in Kufr 'Awan.

== Population ==
The population of Kufr 'Awan was about 12,000 in 2011. The most famous clans are:

1. Al Khashashneh
2. Al Dawagreh
3. Al Dhoun (or Al Dihny)
4. Al Amayreh

As of 2011, the town is served by a health center that provides comprehensive modern services to all citizens in the town and surrounding villages, a post office, two secondary and nine primary schools spread across all areas of the town. The number of mosques in the town were about 14 mosques, in four of which the Friday prayers are held. The town boundaries include a 12 km long railway.

== Economy ==
There are many areas where people come to it from every place of rest and recreation, such as the Wadi Rayan (in the town of Jdita) and this valley is very close to this village and there is also a wooded area Borqush in the town of Kufr Rakeb. In addition to the presence of multiple areas such as Al Mayser that is overlooking the Jordan Valley area of northern Jordan Valley, the West Bank and Palestine. From the eastern Al Heash and Al hawey and Al Harsh which is located west of the village.

Kufr 'Awan is divided into neighborhoods include: Al 'Areed, Al harah, Assellam, Alqasabah, Al Hadeeqah, Aljaddoo'a, Main Triangle, Assenbatey, Al Jalamah and "Assahel and Al'arqoub" Areas where these are characterized by fertile soil and overlooking the land of Palestine.

The town Kufr 'Awan is famous for cultivate olives and figs and modern olive presses, and one of the oldest olive mills in Jordan that still works to present day.

Most of the people of the town Kufr 'Awan work in Government jobs, especially the Jordan Armed Forces and the Ministry of Education and the Ministry of Health, as well as in agriculture.

== Bibliography ==
- Government of Jordan, Department of Statistics (1964). First Census of Population and Housing. Volume I: Final Tables; General Characteristics of the Population (PDF).
- Hütteroth, W.-D.; Abdulfattah, K. (1977). Historical Geography of Palestine, Transjordan and Southern Syria in the Late 16th Century. Erlanger Geographische Arbeiten, Sonderband 5. Erlangen, Germany: Vorstand der Fränkischen Geographischen Gesellschaft. ISBN 3-920405-41-2.
- Robinson, E.; Smith, E. (1841). Biblical Researches in Palestine, Mount Sinai and Arabia Petraea: A Journal of Travels in the year 1838. Vol. 3. Boston: Crocker & Brewster.
