= Jabal Ajlun =

Mountainous region in northwestern Jordan

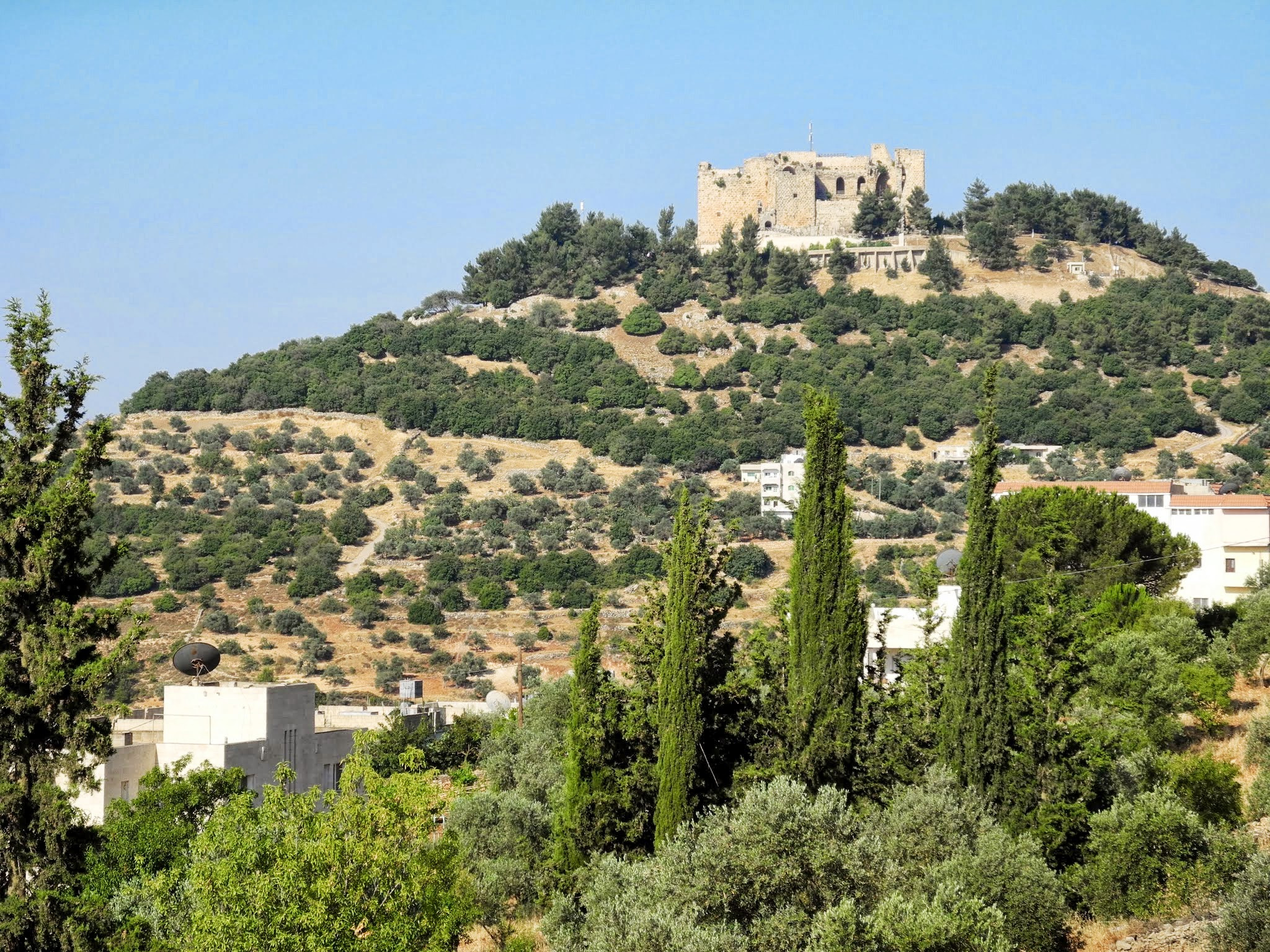
The Ajloun Castle and surrounding country

Jabal Ajlun (Arabic: جبال عجلون) is a mountainous region in northwestern Jordan between the Yarmouk River to the north and the Zarqa River to the south. It is administratively divided among the governorates of Irbid, Ajloun and Jerash. The region's most populous city is Irbid.

== Geography ==
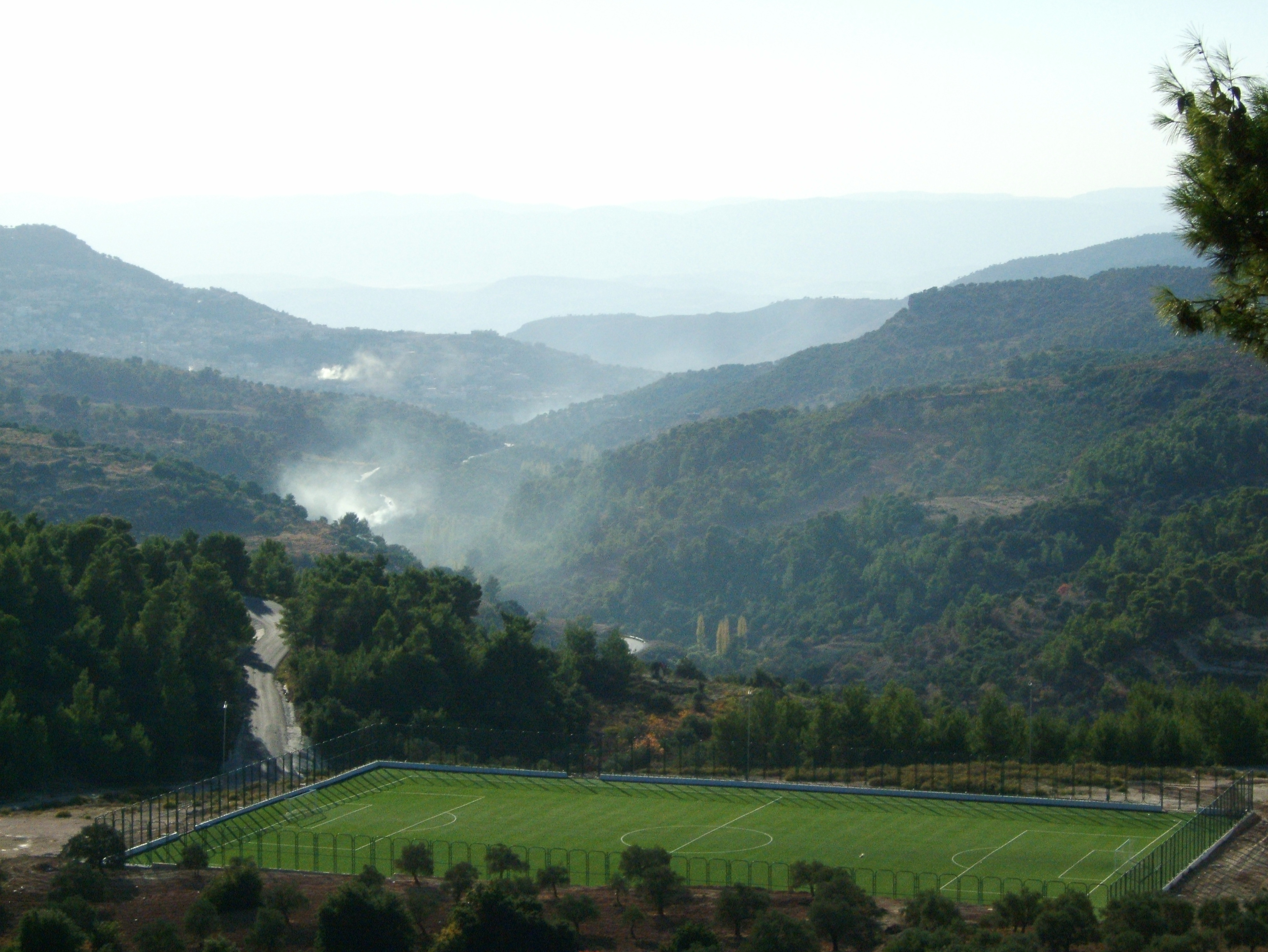
The hill country of Jabal Ajlun, near al-Husn

Jabal Ajlun spans the highlands south of the Yarmouk River, which separate the region from the Golan Heights and the Hauran plain, and north of the Zarqa River, which separates it from the Balqa highlands. It is bound to the west by the Jordan Valley.

The region has the highest level of rainfall in Jordan, with around 500 millimeters (20 in) annually. Jabal Ajlun's relief is characterized by deep ravines that protrude from the Jordan Valley. The numerous springs and streams of the region supply its thick forests and historically enabled the widespread terrace-based cultivation of olive and fruit orchards, as well as grain and pulses.

The southern and western parts of Jabal Ajlun are characterized by high mountains and deep valleys and an abundance of springs. In the north and east of the region the mountains give way to rolling hills and plains, where springs are scarce and villages historically relied on cisterns for water. Wheat cultivation was more prevalent in these less hilly areas.

== Name ==
The region was known as Jabal Jerash until the 12th century when it became known as Jabal Awf, after the Banu Awf tribe which had settled it during the Fatimid period (10th–11th centuries). When the Ayyubid sultan al-Adil (r. 1200–1218) appointed one of his emirs, Izz al-Din Usama, governor of the region, the political situation there was characterized by frequent infighting between the Banu Awf's rival emirs. Izz al-Din erected the Ajloun Castle to defend the area from the tribesmen, who, after initial tensions over the matter, assisted in the castle's construction. The emirs of the Banu Awf were later lured to the fortress and arrested. The region eventually became known as Jabal Ajlun after the castle.

== History ==
The geographer Yaqut al-Hamawi in 1226 noted that 'Jabal Jarash' was a "mountain tract ... full of villages and domains" on which sat the ruins of the city of Jerash. 'Jabal Awf' was mentioned by the emir and historian Abu'l-Fida in 1321 as a district that laid to the southeast of Jabal Amil and contained the "very strong" Ajloun Castle. He noted that "All its territory is very fertile, and it is covered with trees, and well-watered by streams."

=== Ottoman period ===
During Ottoman rule (1517–1917), Jabal Ajlun was consistently the most populated area in Transjordan, with at least eighty permanently inhabited villages recorded in 16th-century tax censuses and in 19th-century travel accounts. This marks a sharp distinction from the rest of Transjordan which saw extensive periods of sparse population. Jabal Ajlun owed its viability to its plentiful rainfall and its hilly terrain, which helped protect it from Bedouin marauding. Administratively, the area was divided into several nahiyes (subdistricts), or effectively communes, each controlled by a local za'im (communal leader; pl. zu'ama). By the mid-19th century, there were eight nahiyes in the district, two of which, Kafarat and Bani Juhma, had survived from the 17th century. The other six nahiyes were Ajlun, Kura, al-Sur, Wastiyya, Bani Abid, and Jerash. In the southern, more mountainous nahiyes the zu'ama were practically autonomous. There, the Ajlun nahiye, one of the most populous in Jabal Ajlun, was controlled by the long-established Furayhat family of Kafrinja and the Ajloun Castle. The smaller, but densely populated Kura nahiye to Ajlun's north was controlled by the Furayhats' chief rivals, the Shuraydat family of Tibna, who had taken over Kura after driving out the Rushdan family to Kafr al-Ma, and eventually into the Jordan Valley. The northern and eastern nahiyes were less defensible due to their more open terrain and were thus vulnerable to raids by Bedouin tribes.

In the years following the inauguration of the empire-wide Tanzimat modernization reforms, the provincial authorities in Damascus resolved to assert state authority in the Jabal Ajlun to protect agricultural production and efficiently collect taxes. The government was in a weaker position there than the Bedouin Adwan and Anaza tribes and the collection of taxes by both powers often drove the peasantry to abandon their villages. The Kurdish cavalry leader Muhammad Sa'id Agha Shamdin was appointed on an expedition to secure the region against the Bedouin in 1844. In 1851 the government established the Ajlun Sanjak with headquarters in Irbid. This government center was further secured by the establishment of an Algerian colony. By January 1852 difficult living conditions spurred the Algerians to leave the region. In May conscription orders prompted the peasants of Jabal Ajlun to revolt. By October, Ajlun was without a governor and was administratively grouped with the rest of Transjordan, under a nominal governor.

With the passage of the Vilayet Law in 1864 and the appointment of the reformist Mehmed Rashid Pasha to Damascus, centralization efforts began to permanently bear fruit for the Ottoman in Jabal Ajlun, as well as in the neighboring Hauran and Transjordan. He established a permanent government headquarters in Irbid and administratively attached Ajlun to the Hauran Sanjak. In 1867, Rashid Pasha launched a military campaign which largely subdued the Bedouin tribes and other autonomous actors, reinforcing this in another campaign in 1869. The imperial government enacted its Land Code in 1858 and in Jabal Ajlun, the first land registrations began in 1876. By 1887 or shortly thereafter, the land registrations were complete, typically manifesting as small shareholding by the peasantry. One of the rare instances of large landholdings was the village of Maru, which was owned by a single family of religious scholars.

By the late 19th century, the prominent Bedouin Beni Sakhr tribe gained practical authority over the eastern and northern nahiyes of Jabal Ajlun. They instituted the customary khuwwa system whereby the villages would contribute to the tribe a share of their grain and other goods in return for protection from Bedouin raids.

== Bibliography ==
- Johns, Adam (1997). Pringle, Denys (ed.). Pilgrims' Castle (ʿAtlit), David's Tower (Jerusalem) and Qalʿat ar-Rabad (ʿAjlun): Three Middle Eastern Castles from the Time of the Crusades. Abingdon and New York: Routledge. ISBN 978-1-138-38685-3.
- Le Strange, G. (1890). Palestine Under the Moslems: A Description of Syria and the Holy Land from A.D. 650 to 1500. Committee of the Palestine Exploration Fund.
- Mundy, Martha; Smith, Richard Samaurez (2007). Governing Property, Making the Modern State: Law, Administration and Production in Ottoman Syria. New York: I. B. Tauris. ISBN 978-1-84511-291-2.
- Rogan, Eugene (1999). Frontiers of the State in the Late Ottoman Empire: Transjordan, 1850-1921. Cambridge: Cambridge University Press. ISBN 0-521-66312-1.
