= Al-Kourah District =

Kourah Department لواء الكورة
- Department
- Location within Jordan
- Coordinates: 32°29′44″N 35°41′2″E
- Country: Jordan
- Governorate: Irbid Governorate
- Municipality: 1922
- Administrative Center: Der Abi Saeed

Government
  - Mayor: Ahmad Jradat

Area
  - Department: 210 km^{2} (81 sq mi)
- Elevation: 450 m (1,480 ft)

Population (2015 census)
  - Metro: 161,505
- Time zone: GMT +2
  - Summer (DST): +3
- Area code: +962(2)

The Al-Kourah (Al-Kūrah or Koorah; Arabic: الكورة) department (or district) is one of the nine departments that make up Irbid Governorate, in Jordan. It is located in the midwestern section of the governorate and is 25 km from Irbid.

The department has an area of 210 km^{2} and includes 22 towns and villages with its administrative center at Der Abi Saeed.

== Geography ==
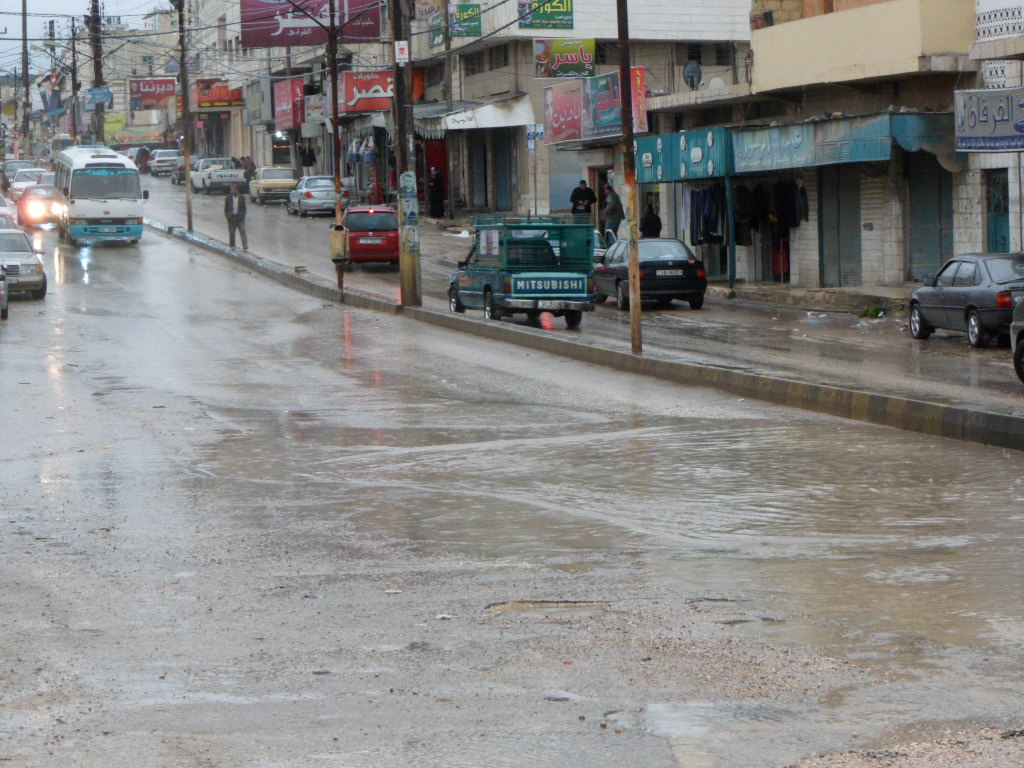
Der Abi Saeed

The area of Kourah is 210 km^{2}, and most of its territory is fertile mountains covered with forests such as the forest Bargash. Its fertile plains constitute part of the fertile Houran plateau. The plateaus of "Ashel Al Qarbi" and "Plains Arkam" cut across several year-round flowing rivers such as the "Rayan" valley and "Wadi Abu Ziad," and "Valley of Zqlab". The highest area is the top of Bargash mountain with a height of 875 meters above sea level and range land to decline from east to west until it reaches 60 meters below sea level in the "Tabaqit Fahel".

=== Land Distribution ===
The area of Koura Department is 210 km^{2} or about (209,518) acres distributed as follows:

- Residential area of the department about 133,041 acres or nearly half the area of the department
- Untapped agricultural area: about 60,509 acres
- Forests: 52,118 acres
- Off-owned land: occupies about one-tenth the total area of the department.

== Climate ==
Prevailing climate in Al Koura is the climate of the Mediterranean basin, which is characterized by a relatively cold and rainy winter season and relatively mild and dry climate in the rest of the year. The climate of Al Koura is more moderate than the prevailing climate in the western and eastern regions.

In the summer, temperatures in the western region are higher than those that are in Al Koura, while in winter, temperatures in the eastern region is lower. However, only rarely do temperatures exceed 35 degrees in the summer and may fall to below freezing in winter.

== Administrative divisions ==
There are three municipalities in this department.

- Municipality of Rabit Kourah: with a population of about 20,000, it includes:

“Smmoa” – “Kafr Kifia” – “Zmal” – “Jenin Safa” – “Arkhim”

- Municipality of Der Abi Saeed: The largest municipality in the department, with a population of 51,750 and includes:

“Der Abi Said” – “Samt” – “Marhba” – “Kafr Al-Maa” – “Abu al-Qayn” – “Jufain” – “Ashrafieh” – “Tobneh”

- Municipality of Bargash: has a population of 45,000 and includes:

“Kufr 'Awan” - “Bit Ides” - “Kufr Rakeb” – “Kofer Abel” – “Judita”

Princess Raya Hospital is located in Der Abi Saeed and serves the department.
