= Deir Abi Saeed =

Der Abi Saeed دير أبي سعيد
- City
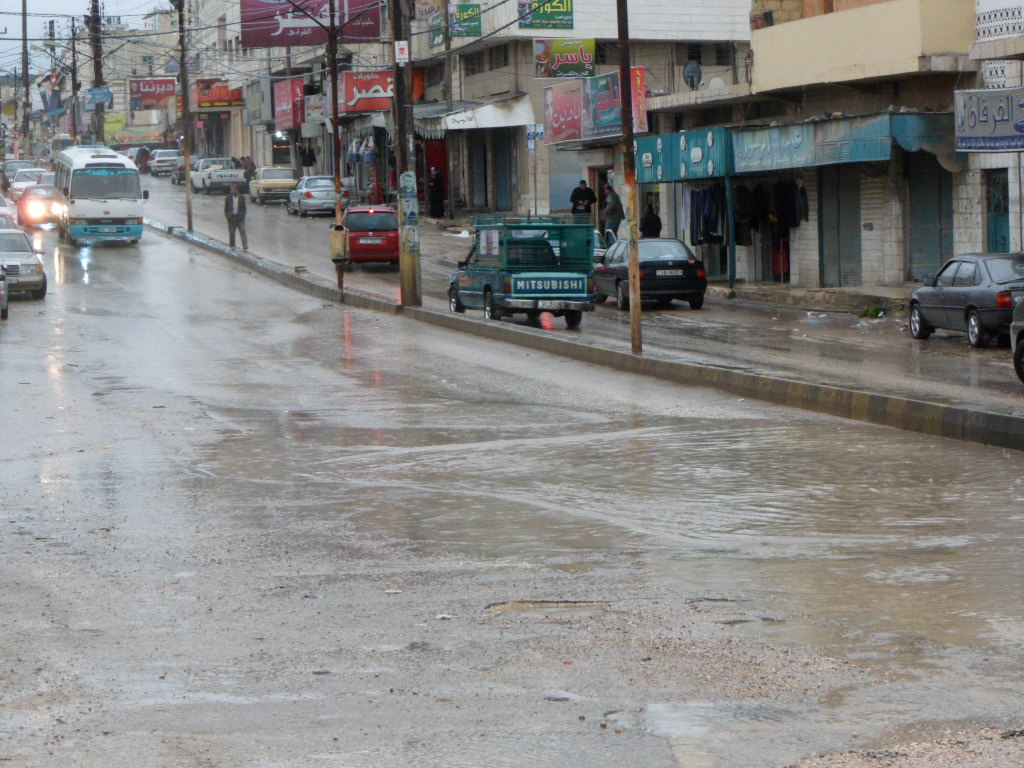

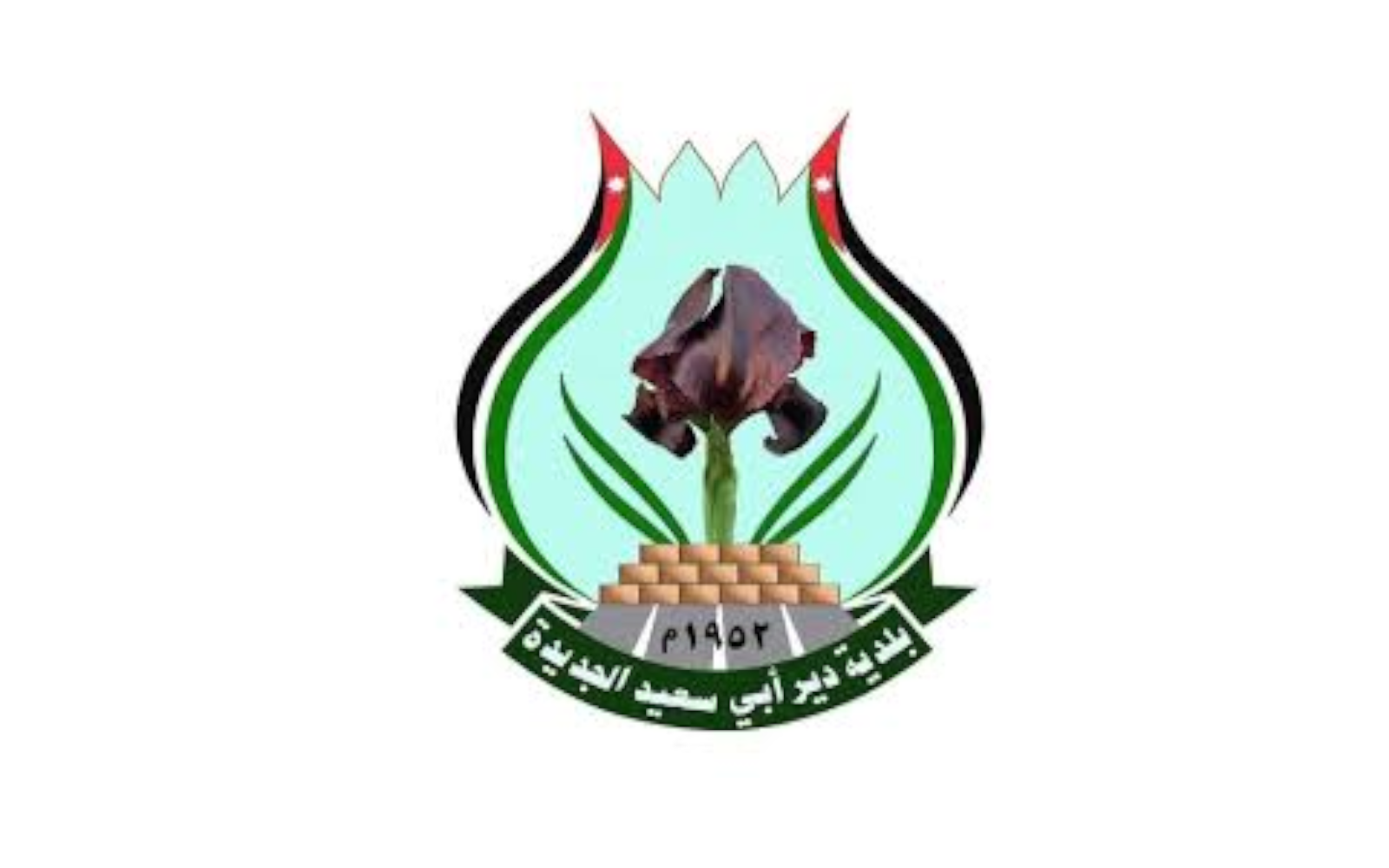
- Flag

- Location within Jordan
- Coordinates: 32°30′9″N 35°41′32″E
- PAL: 214/212
- Country: Jordan
- Province: Irbid Governorate

Government
  - Type: Municipality

Population (2015)
  - Total: 29,590
- Time zone: GMT +2
  - Summer (DST): +3
- Area code: +(962)2

Der Abi Saeed (Arabic: دير أبي سعيد) is a city in Irbid Governorate in Jordan. It is named after a historic Christian chapel ('Der' in Arabic) in the place where the city is built. The city gained importance in the early 20th century after the formation of a self-governing body following the fall of the Ottoman Empire. Der Abi Saeed is the administrative center of the Koura Department, one of the nine departments of Irbid Governorate.

== Geography ==
The city is located in the Jordanian part of the Houran Plateau, about 25 km (16 mi) to the southwest of the city of Irbid in the province of Irbid Governorate, and about 83 km (52 mi) to the north from Jordan's capital Amman.

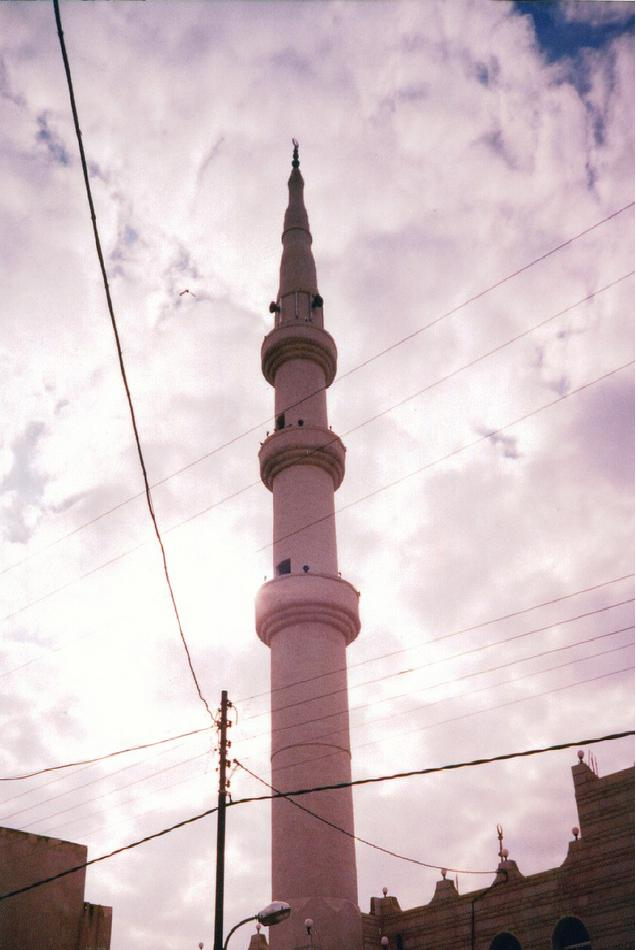
The historic mosque of Der Abi Saeed

== History ==
In 1838 Der Abi Saeed's inhabitants were predominantly Sunni Muslims.

The Jordanian census of 1961 found 1,927 inhabitants in Deir Abu Sa'id.

== Districts ==
The municipality of Der Abi Saeed includes eight districts:

- Der Abi Saeed
- Kafr Al-Maa
- Al-Samt
- Marhaba
- Abu Alqain
- Jeffin
- Ashrafiyeh
- Tibna

== Bibliography ==
- First Census of Population and Housing. Volume I: Final Tables; General Characteristics of the Population (PDF). Government of Jordan, Department of Statistics. 1964.
- Robinson, E.; Smith, E. (1841). Biblical Researches in Palestine, Mount Sinai and Arabia Petraea: A Journal of Travels in the year 1838. Vol. 3. Boston: Crocker & Brewster.
