= List of twin towns and sister cities in Jordan =

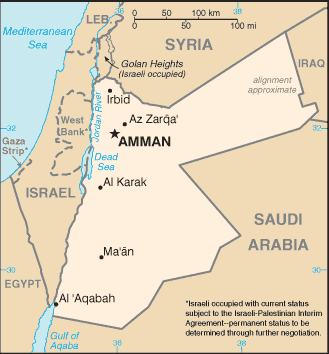
Map of Jordan

This is a list of municipalities in Jordan which have standing links to local communities in other countries known as "town twinning" (usually in Europe) or "sister cities" (usually in the rest of the world).

== A ==
Amman

- Ankara, Turkey
- Astana, Kazakhstan
- Bucharest, Romania
- Cairo, Egypt
- Chicago, United States
- Cincinnati, United States
- Hebron, Palestine
- Islamabad, Pakistan
- Istanbul, Turkey
- Mostar, Bosnia and Herzegovina
- Paphos, Cyprus
- San Francisco, United States
- Sofia, Bulgaria
- Tunis, Tunisia
- Yerevan, Armenia

Aqaba

- Alcamo, Italy
- Hammamet, Tunisia
- Saint Petersburg, Russia
- Sharm El-Sheikh, Egypt
- Ürümqi, China
- Varna, Bulgaria

== D ==
Deir Alla

- Gainesville, United States

== I ==
Irbid

- Gaziantep, Turkey
- Zhengzhou, China

== J ==
Jerash

- Huedin, Romania
- Orăștie, Romania
- Sliven, Bulgaria

== K ==
Al-Karak

- Birmingham, United States
- Veliko Tarnovo, Bulgaria

== M ==
Madaba

- Cherkasy, Ukraine
- Tundzha, Bulgaria

== P ==
Petra

- Agra, India
- Matera, Italy
- Plovdiv, Bulgaria

== S ==
Al-Salt

- Inđija, Serbia
- Pazardzhik, Bulgaria

Al-Shuna al-Shamalyah

- Jericho, Palestine

== Z ==
Zarqa

- Oran, Algeria
