= Kufr Rakeb =

Kufr Rakeb كفر راكب
- Town
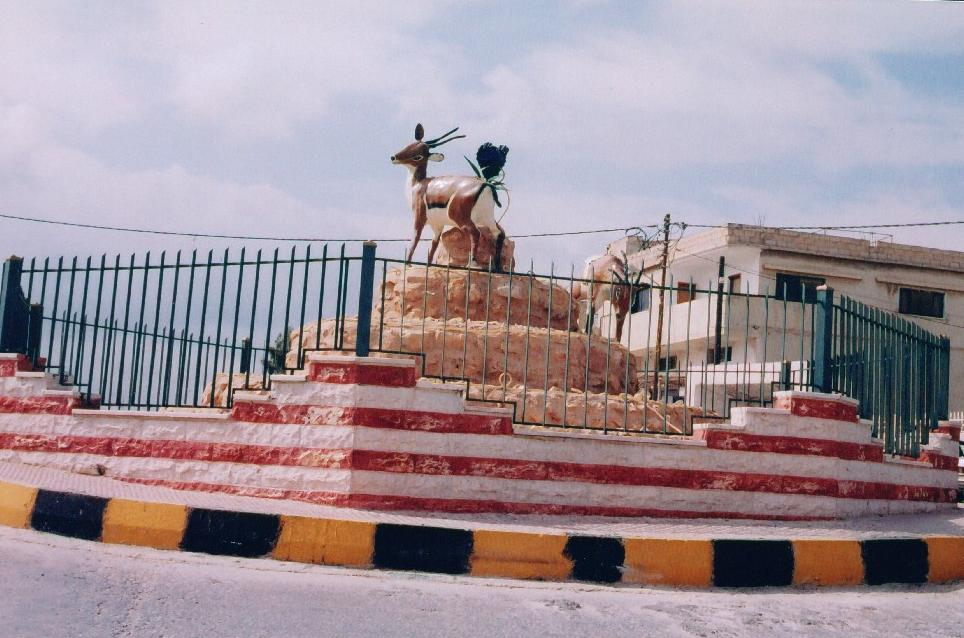
- A circle in Kufr Rakeb

- Location within Jordan
- Coordinates: 32°27′7″N 35°41′40″E
- PAL: 215/207
- Country: Jordan
- Province: Irbid Governorate
- Department: Koura

Population (2022)
  - Total: 12,150
- Time zone: GMT +2
  - Summer (DST): +3
- Area code: +(962)2

Kufr Rakeb (Arabic: كفر راكب) is a town in Irbid Governorate in Jordan. It is one of the five metropolitan districts of Barqash.

== Geography ==
Located in the south western region of Irbid Governorate, Kufr Rakeb is one of the five metropolitan districts that make up the municipality of Barqash. It is situated close to the Jordan Valley, and administratively belongs to the Kourah Department.

== History ==
In 1838 Kufr Rakeb's inhabitants were predominantly Sunni Muslims.

The Jordanian census of 1961 found 662 inhabitants in Kufr Rakib.

== Population ==
The town of Kufr Rakeb, has an estimated population of 5,000 (2011). It is the center of the municipality of Barqash, which has a population of about 45,000 (2011). The town is mainly agricultural. The Population of Kufr Rakeb in 2022 is 12,000.

== See also ==
- Kufor–Rakeb syndrome

== Bibliography ==
- Government of Jordan, Department of Statistics (1964). First Census of Population and Housing. Volume I: Final Tables; General Characteristics of the Population (PDF).
- Robinson, E.; Smith, E. (1841). Biblical Researches in Palestine, Mount Sinai and Arabia Petraea: A Journal of Travels in the year 1838. Vol. 3. Boston: Crocker & Brewster.
