= Kafr al-Maa =

Kafr Al-Maa كفر الماء
- Town
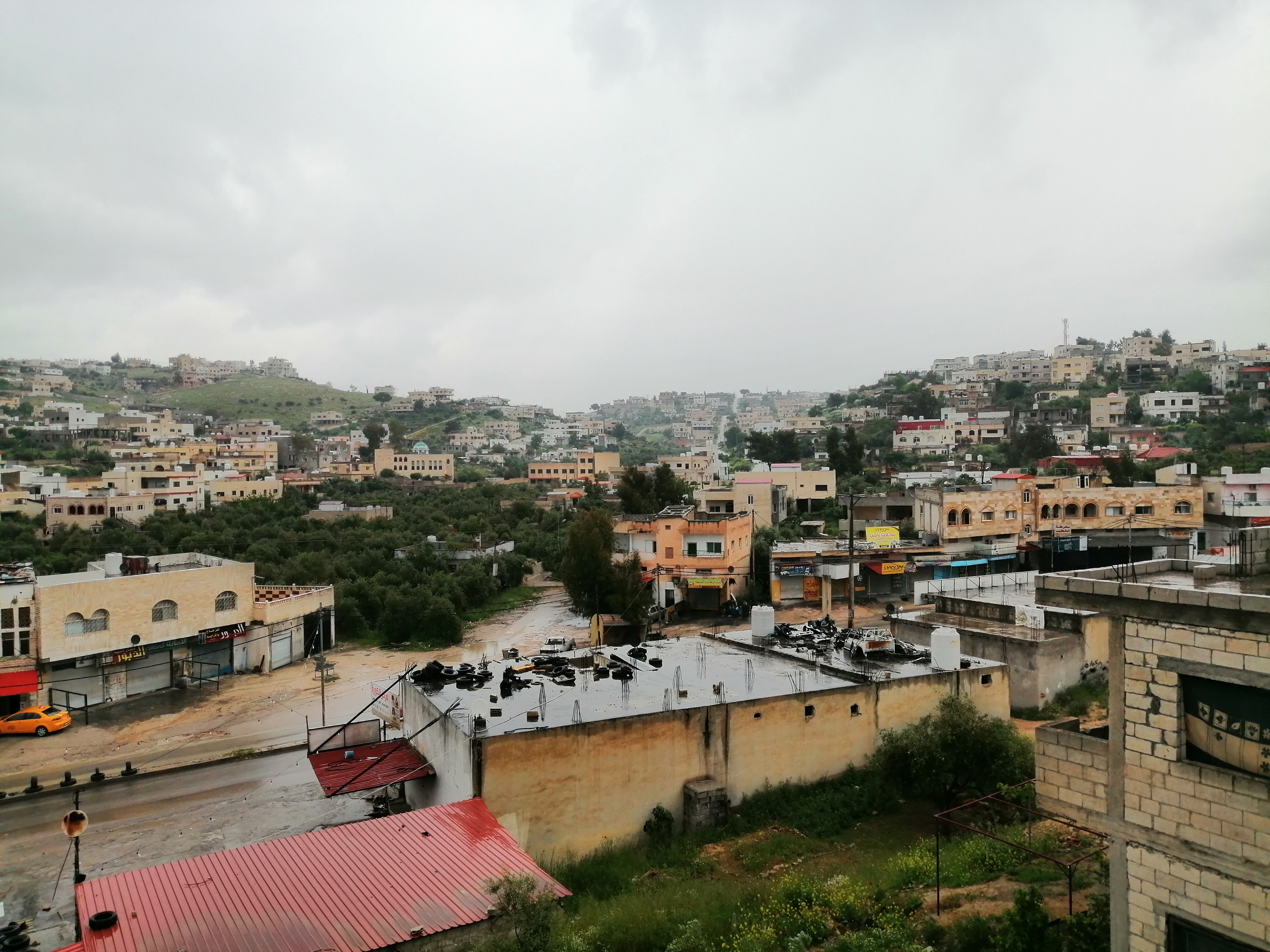
- Kafr Al-Maa

- Location within Jordan
- Coordinates: 32°29′02″N 35°41′49″E
- PAL: 215/210
- Country: Jordan
- Irbid Governorate: Al-Kourah District

Government
  - Type: Der Abi SaeedMunicipality
- Elevation: 450 m (1,480 ft)
- Time zone: GMT +2
  - Summer (DST): +3
- Area code: +(962)2

Kafr Al-Maa (Arabic: كفر الماء) is one of the Al-Kourah District towns, in the province of Irbid, Jordan, and away from the Irbid city district center 28 km to the south-west, and the capital, Amman, about 81 km in the north-west direction. It had a population of 17,919 in 2015.

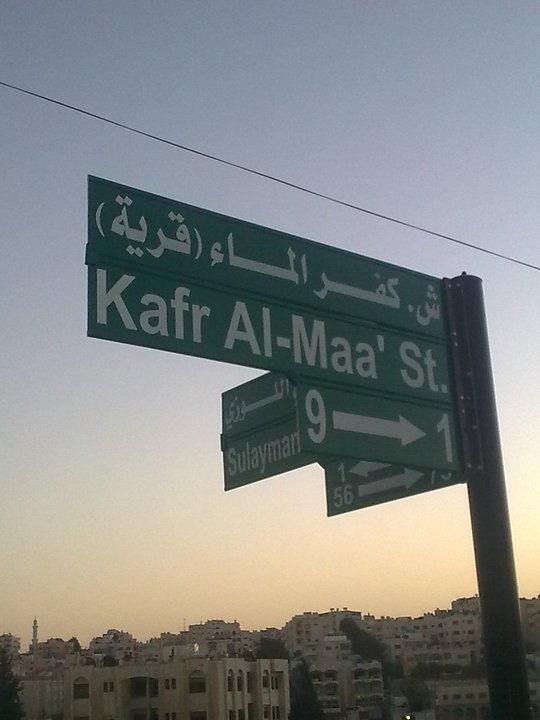
Kafr Al-Maa Road in Amman City

== Location ==
Kafr Al-Maa is located south of Der Abi Saeed, north of Kufr Rakeb.

== History ==
In 1596 it appeared in the Ottoman tax registers named as Kafr Alma, situated in the nahiya (subdistrict) of Kura, part of the Sanjak of Ajlun. It had 45 households and 10 bachelors; all Muslim. The villagers paid a fixed tax-rate of 25% on agricultural products; including wheat, barley, olive trees/vineyards/fruit trees, goats and bee-hives; in addition to occasional revenues. The total tax was 10,000 akçe.

In 1838 Kafr Al-Maa's inhabitants were noted as being predominantly Sunni Muslims.

The Jordanian census of 1961 found 1,517 inhabitants in Kufr Ma.

== Bibliography ==
- Government of Jordan, Department of Statistics (1964). First Census of Population and Housing. Volume I: Final Tables; General Characteristics of the Population (PDF).
- Hütteroth, W.-D.; Abdulfattah, K. (1977). Historical Geography of Palestine, Transjordan and Southern Syria in the Late 16th Century. Erlanger Geographische Arbeiten, Sonderband 5. Erlangen, Germany: Vorstand der Fränkischen Geographischen Gesellschaft. ISBN 3-920405-41-2.
- Robinson, E.; Smith, E. (1841). Biblical Researches in Palestine, Mount Sinai and Arabia Petraea: A Journal of Travels in the year 1838. Vol. 3. Boston: Crocker & Brewster.
