= Tiberias =

City in northern Israel

Tiberias טְבֶרְיָה (Hebrew) طَبَرِيَّا (Arabic)
- City

Hebrew transcription(s)
  - Also spelled: Tveria, Tveriah (unofficial)
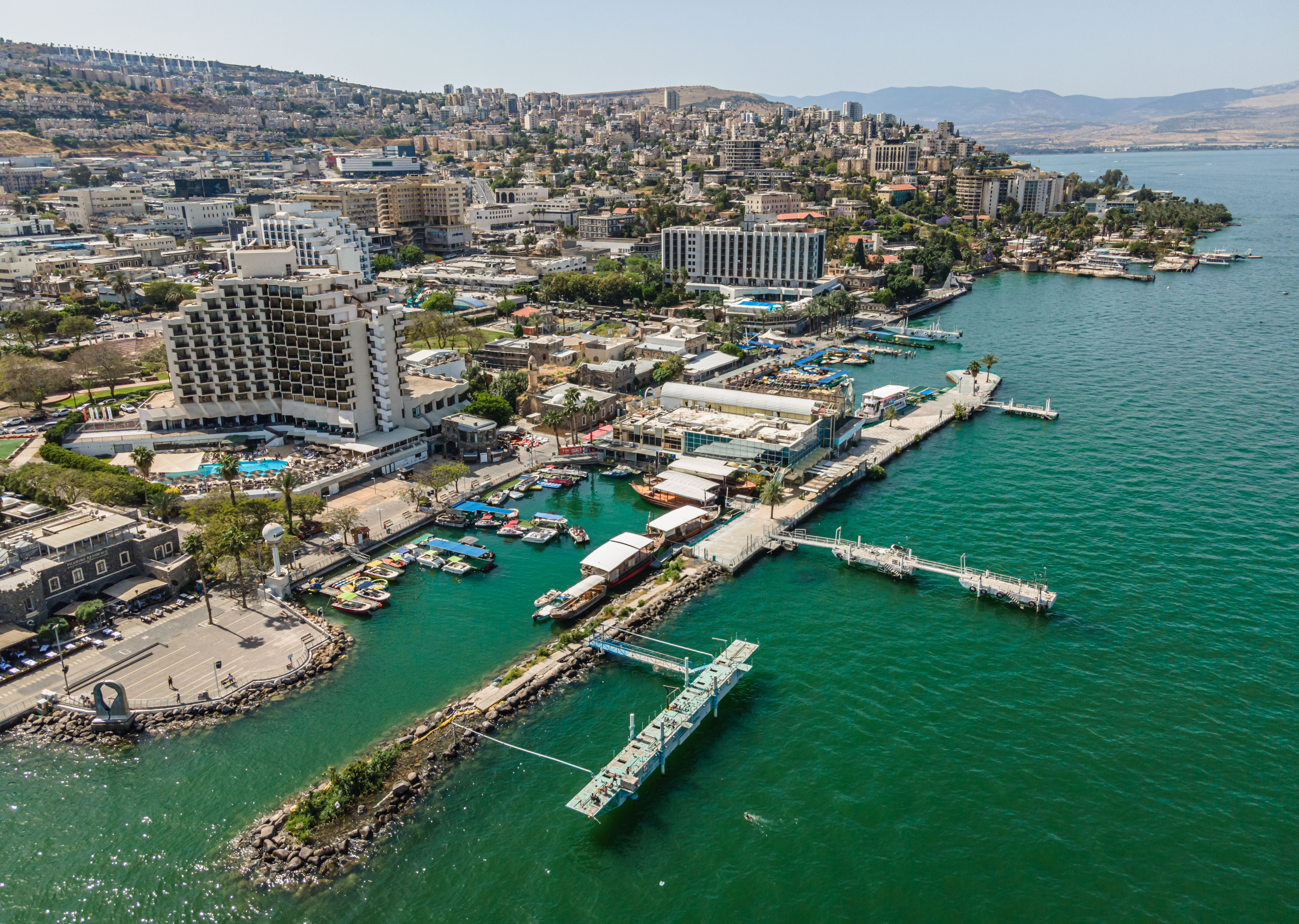
- View of Tiberias

- Flag Coat of arms

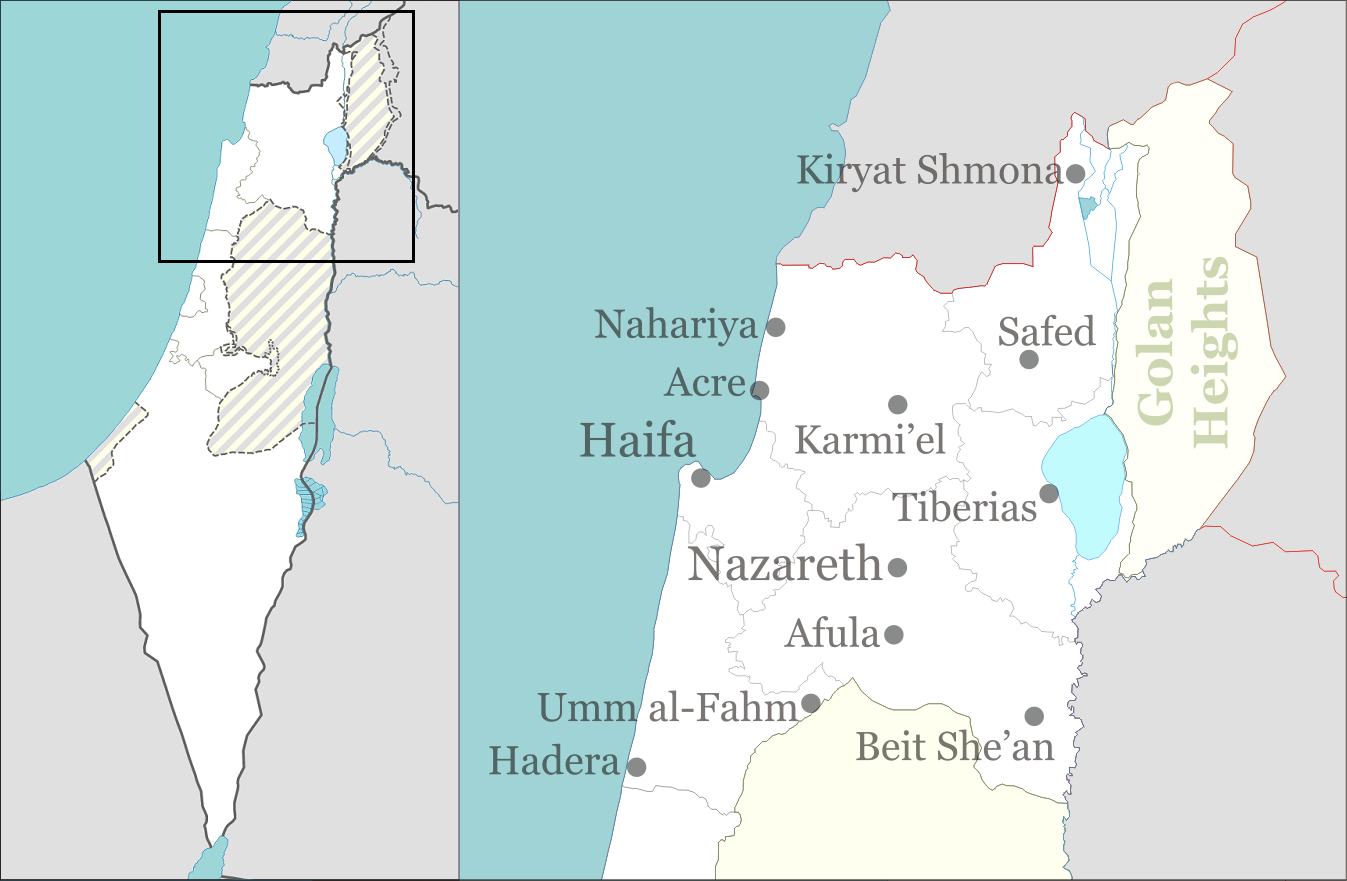
- Location within Northern Haifa region of Israel Location within Israel
- Coordinates: 32°47′40″N 35°32′00″E
- Grid position: 201/243 PAL
- Country: Israel
- District: Northern
- Subdistrict: Kinneret
- Natural Region: Kinerot
- Founded: 1200 BCE (Biblical Rakkath); 20 CE (Herodian city)

Government
  - Type: Mayor–council
  - Body: Municipality of Tiberias
  - Mayor: Yossi Naba'a

Area
  - Total: 10,872 dunams (10.872 km^{2}; 4.198 sq mi)

Population (2024)
  - Total: 52,123
  - Density: 4,794.2/km^{2} (12,417/sq mi)

Ethnicity
  - Jews and others: 98.5%
  - Arabs: 1.5%
- Time zone: UTC+2 (IST)
  - Summer (DST): UTC+3 (IDT)
- Name meaning: City of Tiberius
- Website: www.tiberias.muni.il

Tiberias (/taɪˈbɪəriəs/ ty-BEER-ee-əs; Hebrew: טְבֶרְיָה, Ṭəveryā; Arabic: طَبَرِيَّا, romanized: Ṭabariyyā) is a city on the western shore of the Sea of Galilee in northern Israel. A major Jewish center during Late Antiquity, it has been considered since the 18th century one of Judaism's Four Holy Cities, along with Jerusalem, Hebron, and Safed. In 2024, it had a population of 52,123.

Tiberias was founded around 20 CE by Herod Antipas and was named after Roman emperor Tiberius. It became a major political and religious hub of the Jews in the Land of Israel after the destruction of Jerusalem and the desolation of Judea during the Jewish–Roman wars. From the time of the second through the tenth centuries CE, Tiberias was the largest Jewish city in Galilee, and much of the Mishna and the Jerusalem Talmud were compiled there. Tiberias flourished during the Early Muslim period (c. 7th–10th centuries CE), when it served as the capital of Jund al-Urdunn and became a multi-cultural trading center. The city's importance declined in some periods due to earthquake damage and foreign incursions. After the Galilee earthquake of 1837, the city was rebuilt and grew steadily following the First Jewish Aliyah in the 1880s.

During the Ottoman period, Tiberias had a predominantly Muslim population in the early centuries, while from the late Ottoman period, the city became increasingly mixed and at times, had a Jewish majority or plurality. By the late Ottoman and early British Mandate period, it remained a mixed city with significant Jewish, Muslim, and Christian population. By the late Mandatory Palestine period, it had a majority Jewish population, but with a significant Arab community. During the 1947–1948 civil war in Mandatory Palestine, fighting broke out between the Jewish residents of Tiberias and its Palestinian Arab minority. As the Haganah took over, British troops evacuated the entire Palestinian Arab population; they were refused reentry after the war, such that today the city has an almost exclusively Jewish population. After the war ended, the new Israeli authorities destroyed the Old City of Tiberias. A large number of Jewish immigrants to Israel subsequently settled in Tiberias.

Today, Tiberias is an important tourist center due to its proximity to the Sea of Galilee and religious sanctity to Judaism and Christianity. The city also serves as a regional industrial and commercial center. Its immediate neighbour to the south, Hammat Tiberias, which is now part of modern Tiberias, has been known for its hot springs, believed to cure skin and other ailments, for some two thousand years.

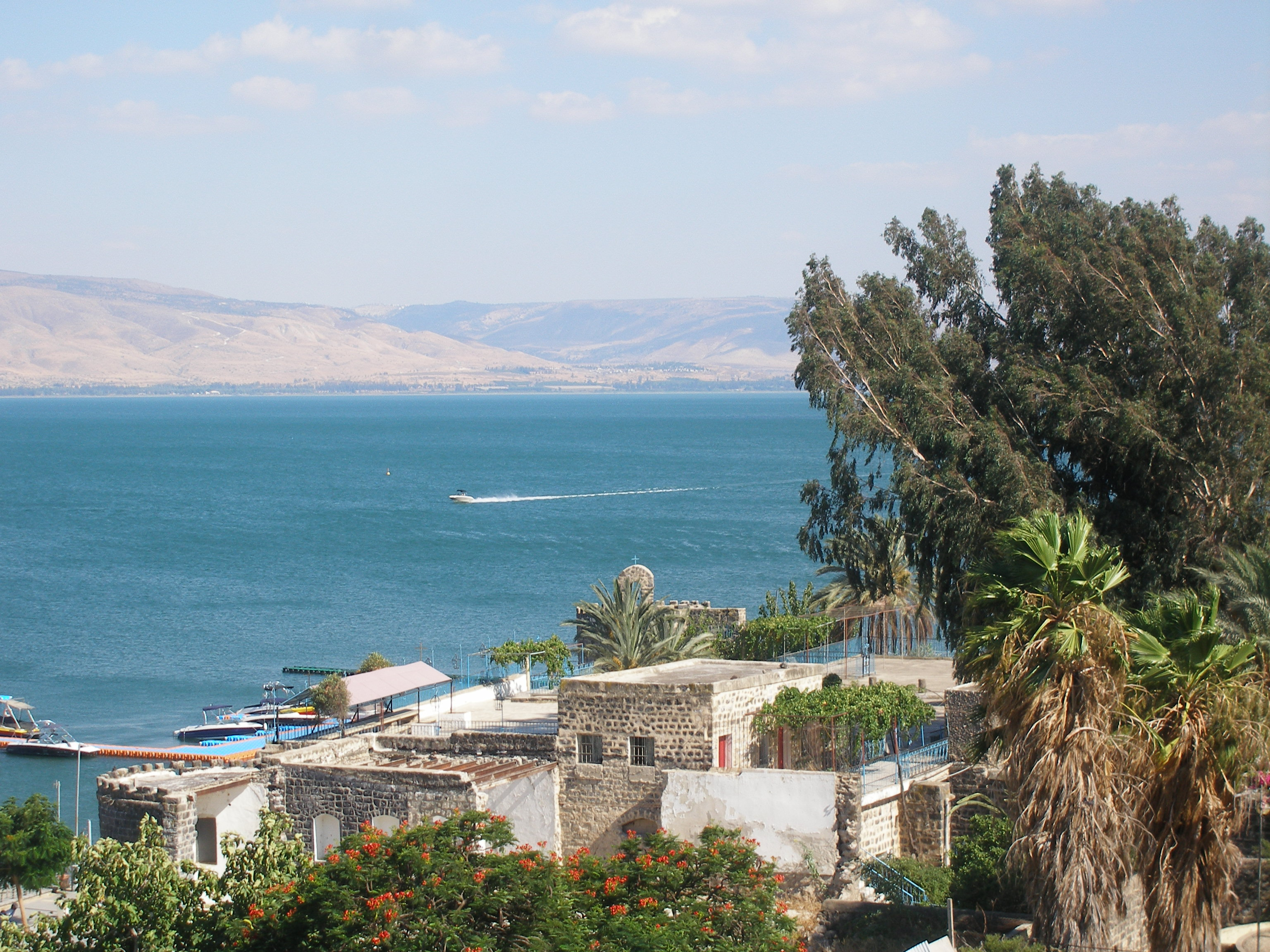
Tiberias

== Etymology ==
The city of Tiberias was named after the Roman Emperor Tiberius.

A Midrash regarding the city's name appears in the Babylonian Talmud, Tractate Megillah 6A:

"Rabbi Yirmiya said: [...] And why is it called Tiberias? Because it sits at the navel (tabur) of the Land of Israel".

Rashi, in his commentary, provides two interpretations of the Midrash. The first explains the word "navel" (tabur) as referring to the lowest point in the Land of Israel. The second interpretation suggests that Tiberias is situated at the geographical center of the Land of Israel. Ishtori Haparchi later substantiated this claim through measurements of the entire land, demonstrating its accuracy.

== Biblical relevance ==
=== Hebrew Bible and Talmud ===
Jewish tradition holds that Tiberias was built on the site of the ancient Israelite village of Rakkath (or Rakkat), first mentioned in the Book of Joshua (Josh 19:35). In Talmudic times, the Jews still referred to it by this name.

=== Gospels ===
See Diocese of Tiberias for ecclesiastical history

The city is mentioned directly only in John 6:23, noting that boats from Tiberias came near the place where Jesus had fed the 5,000.

== History ==
=== Roman period ===
==== Herodian period ====
Tiberias was founded sometime around 18–20 CE in the Herodian Tetrarchy of Galilee and Perea by the Roman client king Herod Antipas, son of Herod the Great. Herod Antipas made it the capital of his realm in Galilee and named it after the Roman emperor Tiberius. The city was built in immediate proximity to a spa which had developed around seventeen natural mineral hot springs, Hammat Tiberias. Tiberias was at first a strictly pagan city, but later became populated mainly by Jews, with its growing spiritual and religious status exerting a strong influence on balneological practices. Conversely, in Antiquities of the Jews, the Roman-Jewish historian Josephus calls the village with hot springs Emmaus, today's Hammat Tiberias, located near Tiberias. This name also appears in his work The Jewish War.

Under the Roman Empire, the city was known by its Koine Greek name Τιβεριάς (Tiberiás, Greek: Τιβεριάδα, romanized: Tiveriáda).

In the days of Herod Antipas, some of the most religiously orthodox Jews, who were struggling against the process of Hellenisation, which had affected even some priestly groups, refused to settle there: the presence of a cemetery rendered the site ritually unclean for the Jews and particularly for the priestly caste. Antipas settled many non-Jews there from rural Galilee and other parts of his domains in order to populate his new capital, and built a palace on the acropolis. The prestige of Tiberias was so great that the Sea of Galilee soon came to be named the Sea of Tiberias; however, the Jewish population continued to call it Yam HaKineret, its traditional name. The city was governed by a city council of 600 with a committee of ten until 44 CE, when a Roman procurator was set over the city after the death of Herod Agrippa I. The city is estimated to have had a population between 4,500 and 15,000 during the first century CE.

Tiberias is mentioned in John 6:23 as the location from which boats had sailed to the opposite, eastern side of the Sea of Galilee. The crowd seeking Jesus after the miraculous feeding of the 5000 used these boats to travel back to Capernaum on the north-western part of the lake.

In 61 CE, Herod Agrippa II annexed the city to his kingdom whose capital was Caesarea Philippi.

==== Great Revolt and Bar Kokhba revolt ====
During the First Jewish–Roman War, the Jewish rebels took control of the city and destroyed Herod's palace, and were able to prevent the city from being pillaged by the army of Agrippa II, the Jewish ruler who had remained loyal to Rome. Eventually, the rebels were expelled from Tiberias, and while most other cities in the provinces of Judaea, Galilee and Idumea were razed, Tiberias was spared this fate because its inhabitants had decided not to fight against Rome. It became a mixed city after the fall of Jerusalem in 70 CE; with Judea subdued, the surviving southern Jewish population migrated to Galilee. An epitaph found in Taenarum, Laconia (modern Kyparissa, Greece) records a man named Justus, son of Andromache, from Tiberias. He is believed to have been a first- or second-generation refugee displaced from Tiberias in the aftermath of the revolt.

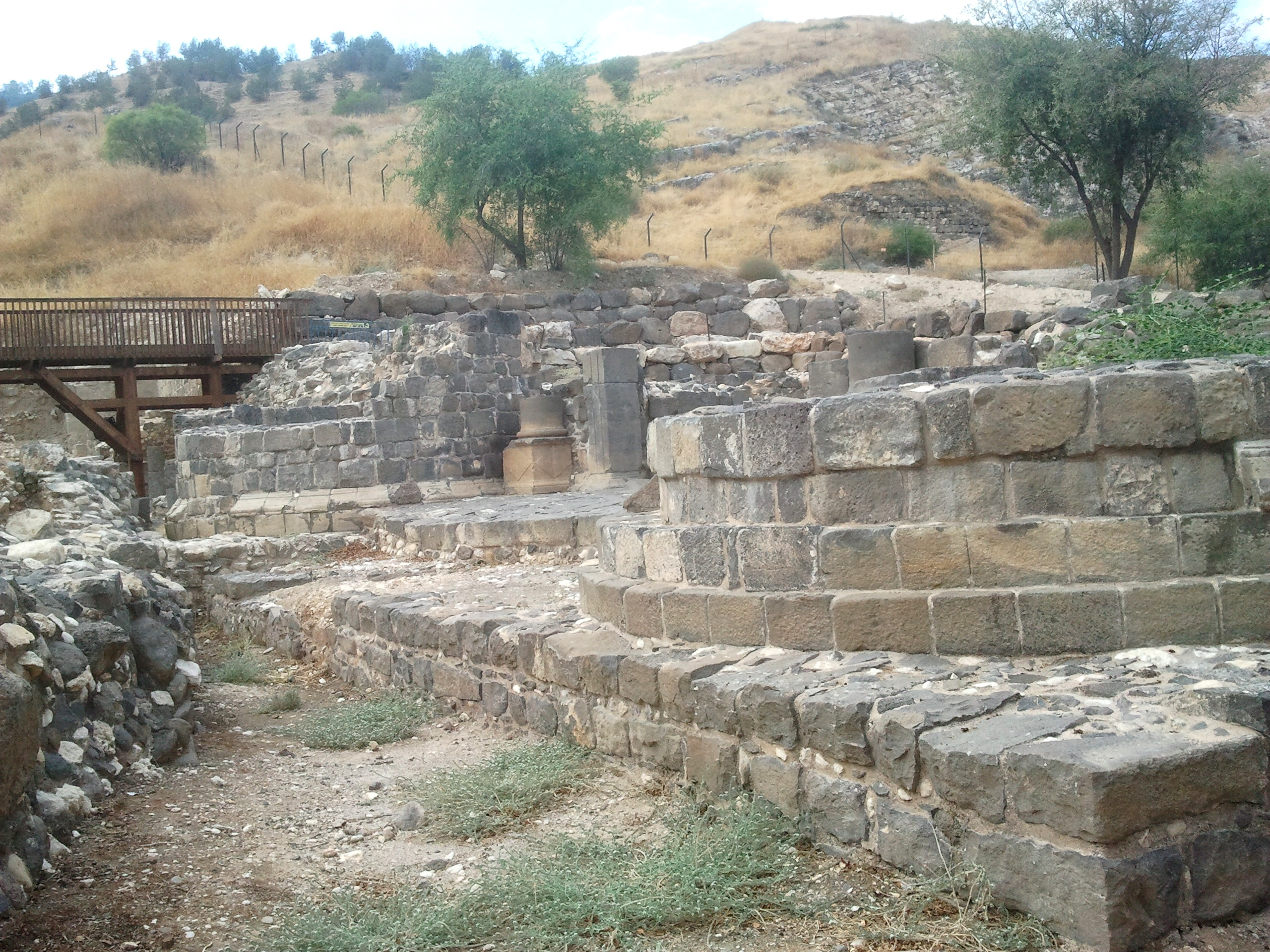
The Roman-Byzantine southern city gate

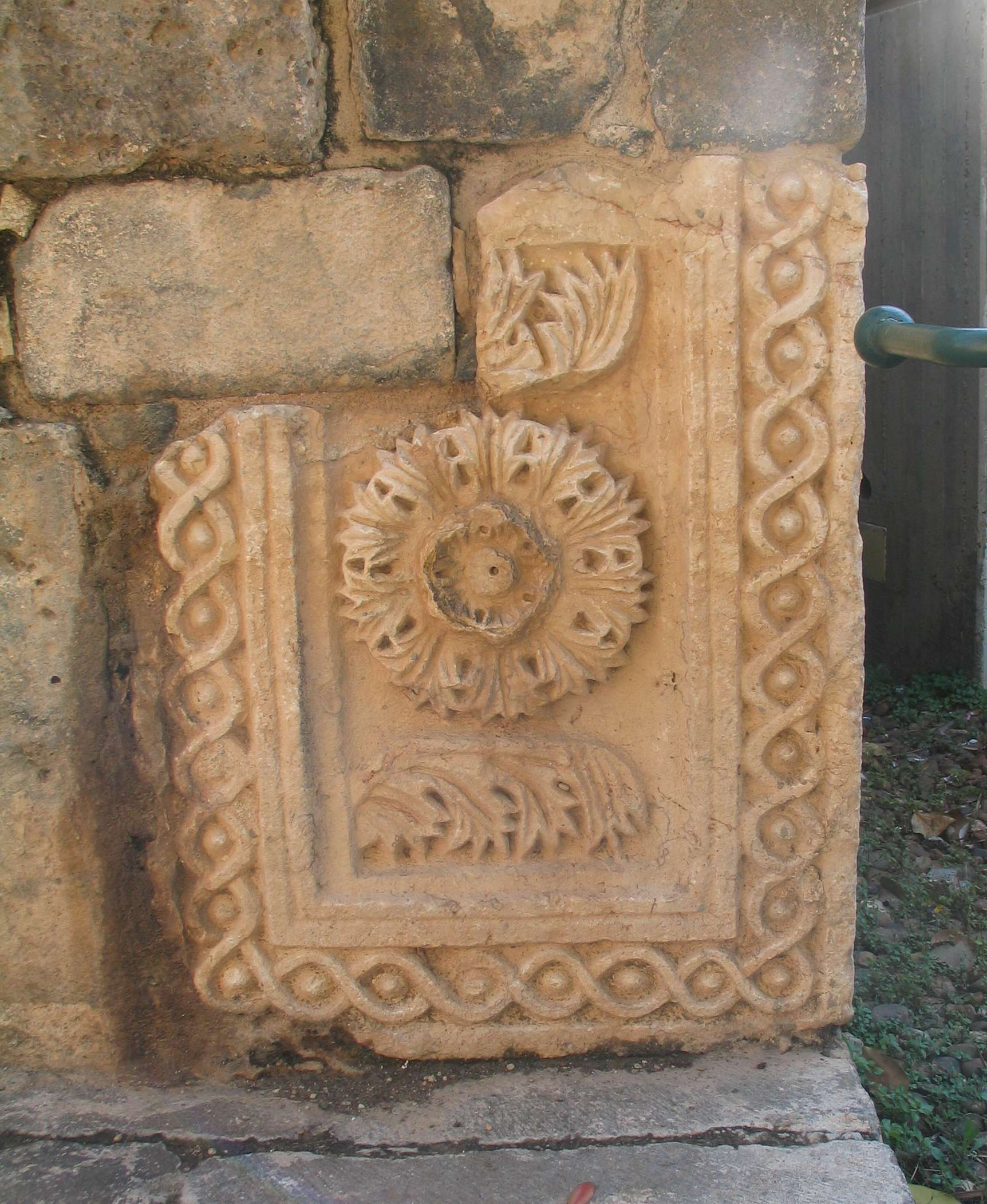
Remains of Crusader fortress gate with ancient lintel in secondary use

There is no direct indication that Tiberias, as well as the rest of Galilee, took part in the Bar Kokhba revolt of 132–136 CE, thus allowing it to continue to exist, despite a heavy economic decline due to the war. Following the expulsion of Jews from Judea after 135 CE, Tiberias and its neighbour Sepphoris (Hebrew name: Tzippori) became the major Jewish cultural centres.

==== Late Roman period ====
According to the Talmud, in 145 CE, Rabbi Simeon bar Yochai, who was very familiar with Galilee, hiding there for over a decade, "cleansed the city of ritual impurity", allowing the Jewish leadership to resettle there from the Judea, which they were forced to leave as fugitives. The Sanhedrin, the Jewish court, also fled from Jerusalem during the Great Jewish Revolt against Rome, and after several attempted moves, in search of stability, eventually settled in Tiberias in about 220 CE. It was to be its final meeting place before its disbanding in 425 CE. When Johanan bar Nappaha (d. 279) settled in Tiberias, the city became the focus of Jewish religious scholarship in the land and the so-named Jerusalem Talmud was compiled by his school in Tiberias between 230–270 CE. Tiberias' 13 synagogues served the spiritual needs of a growing Jewish population. Tombs of famous rabbis Yohanan ben Zakkai, Akiva and Maimonides are also located in the city.

==== Byzantine period ====
During the Byzantine period, Tiberias was incorporated into the province of Palaestina Secunda. In the 6th century Tiberias was still the seat of Jewish religious learning. In light of this, the Letter of Simeon of Beth Arsham urged the Christians of Palaestina to seize the leaders of Judaism in Tiberias, to put them to the rack, and to compel them to command the Jewish king, Dhu Nuwas, to desist from persecuting the Christians in Najran.

In 614, Tiberias was the site where, during the final Jewish revolt against the Byzantine Empire, parts of the Jewish population supported the Persian invaders; the Jewish rebels were financed by Benjamin of Tiberias, a man of immense wealth; according to Christian sources, during the revolt Christians were massacred and churches destroyed. In 628, the Byzantine army returned to Tiberias upon the surrender of Jewish rebels and the end of the Persian occupation after they were defeated in the battle of Nineveh. A year later, influenced by radical Christian monks, Emperor Heraclius instigated a wide-scale slaughter of the Jews, which practically emptied Galilee of most its Jewish population, with survivors fleeing to Egypt.

=== Early Muslim period ===
During the Muslim conquest of Syria, Tiberias capitulated to the Arab commander Shurahbil ibn Hasana in c. 636. As part of the agreement, half the houses and churches were ceded to the Muslims, the other half to the Christians. Tiberias thereafter became the capital of Jund al-Urdunn (the military district of [the River] Jordan). Its territory corresponded with the Byzantine province of Palaestina Secunda (Palestine II, i.e. the Galilee and southern Lebanese mountains) with the additions of the Mediterranean coastal towns of Acre and Tyre and Jerash east of the Jordan River. Caliph Umar (r. 634–644) allowed 70 Jewish families from Tiberias to form the core of a renewed Jewish presence in Jerusalem.

The Umayyads, who ruled the caliphate (Islamic empire) in 660–750, developed Tiberias and its district, building palaces and places of entertainment at nearby Khirbat al-Minya and Sinnabra. A Greek inscription credits the first Umayyad caliph Mu'awiya I for restoring the Roman-era bathworks at Hammat Gader in 663. The presaging of the inscription with a cross and the use of Greek both signal an effort by Mu'awiya to appease the Christians who formed the majority of his subjects. During this period, Tiberias was a center of trade between Egypt and the Umayyad capital at Damascus, particularly in small wares and agricultural products. Trade was particularly intensive between Tiberias and the other major inland towns of its district, Beisan and Jerash, as well as with Damascus, as indicated by numistatic evidence. Accommodating this trade was a large market in the middle of Tiberias and shops at its southern end.

The town became home to a mixed population of Muslims, Christians and Jews. The Muslims were concentrated in the southern quarter, while the Jews resided in the north side. Jewish studies flourished around the town's Eretz Israel Academy. The oral traditions of ancient Hebrew, still in use today, were codified in Tiberias. One of the leading members of the Tiberian Masoretic community was Aaron ben Moses ben Asher, who refined the oral tradition now known as Tiberian Hebrew. Both the Codex Cairensis and the Aleppo Codex were written in Tiberias. The Tiberian vocalization was devised here in the 7th–8th centuries. Willibald visited in 724 and noted several churches and synagogues. In 808, Tiberias had five churches and one convent. Although it was likely a mosque was founded in Tiberias not long after the Muslim conquest, the first known mention of a mosque is by the Jerusalemite geographer al-Muqaddasi in 985, who wrote that it stood in the market and was "large and fine", its floors laid with pebbles resting on stone drums. An imposing mosque, 90 metres (300 feet) long by 78 metres (256 feet) wide, resembling the Great Mosque of Damascus, was raised at the foot of Mount Berenice next to a Byzantine church, to the south of the city, as the eighth century ushered in Tiberias's golden age, when the multicultural city may have been the most tolerant of the Middle East.

Al-Muqaddasi described the city as long and narrow, its houses built between the hills and the Sea of Galilee, its market extending between its two gates and its cemetery on the hillside. The inhabitants obtained their water from the lake, where fish were in abundance. Al-Muqaddasi wrote of its hot and unhealthy climate, noting that its inhabitants, depending on the time of year, contended with fleas or wasps, gorged on jujube or sugar cane, walked naked amid the heat and wallowed in muddy streets. In the vicinity of town were eight natural hot baths which bathers used to treat skin ailments.

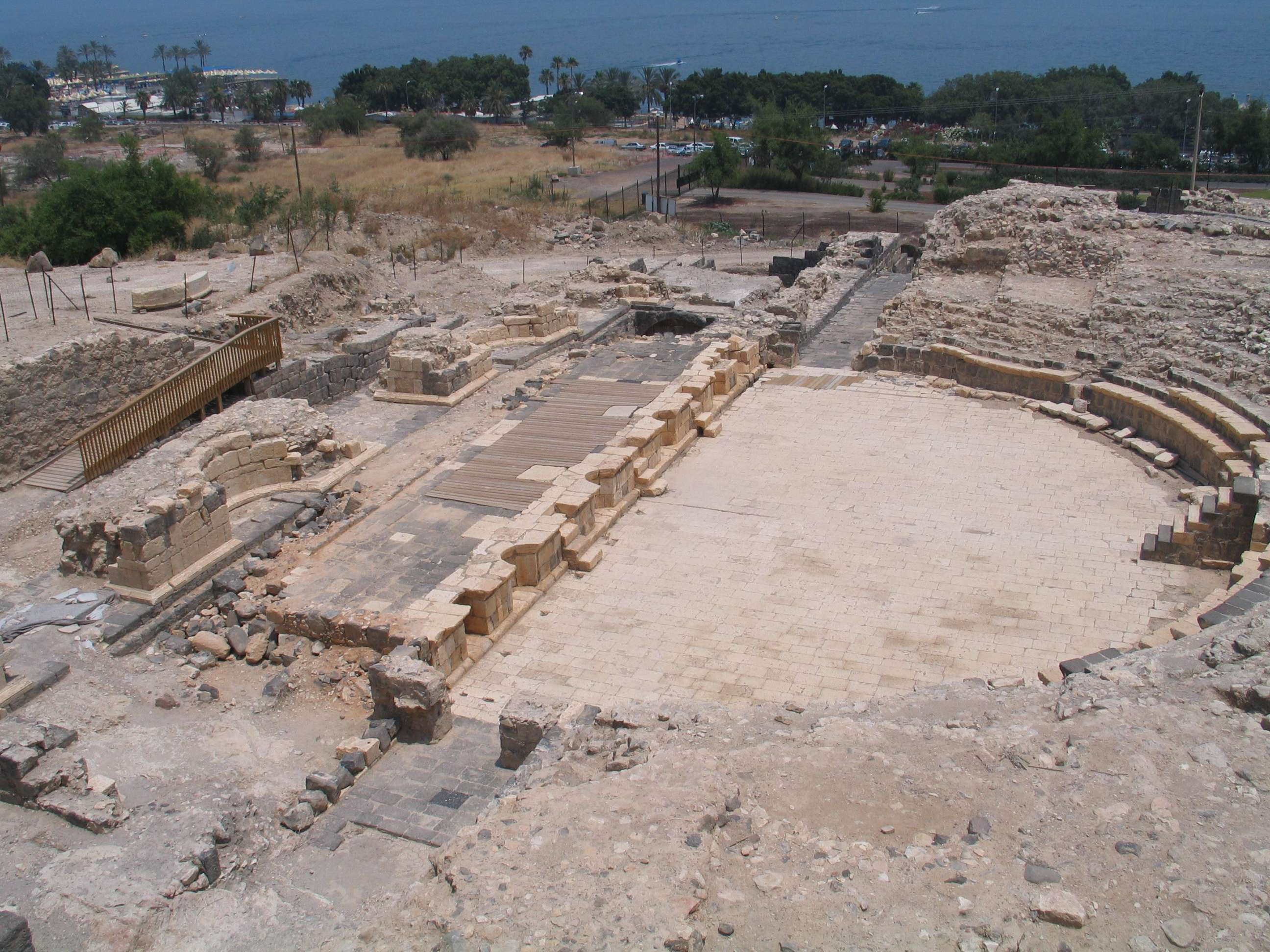
Remains of Roman theatre

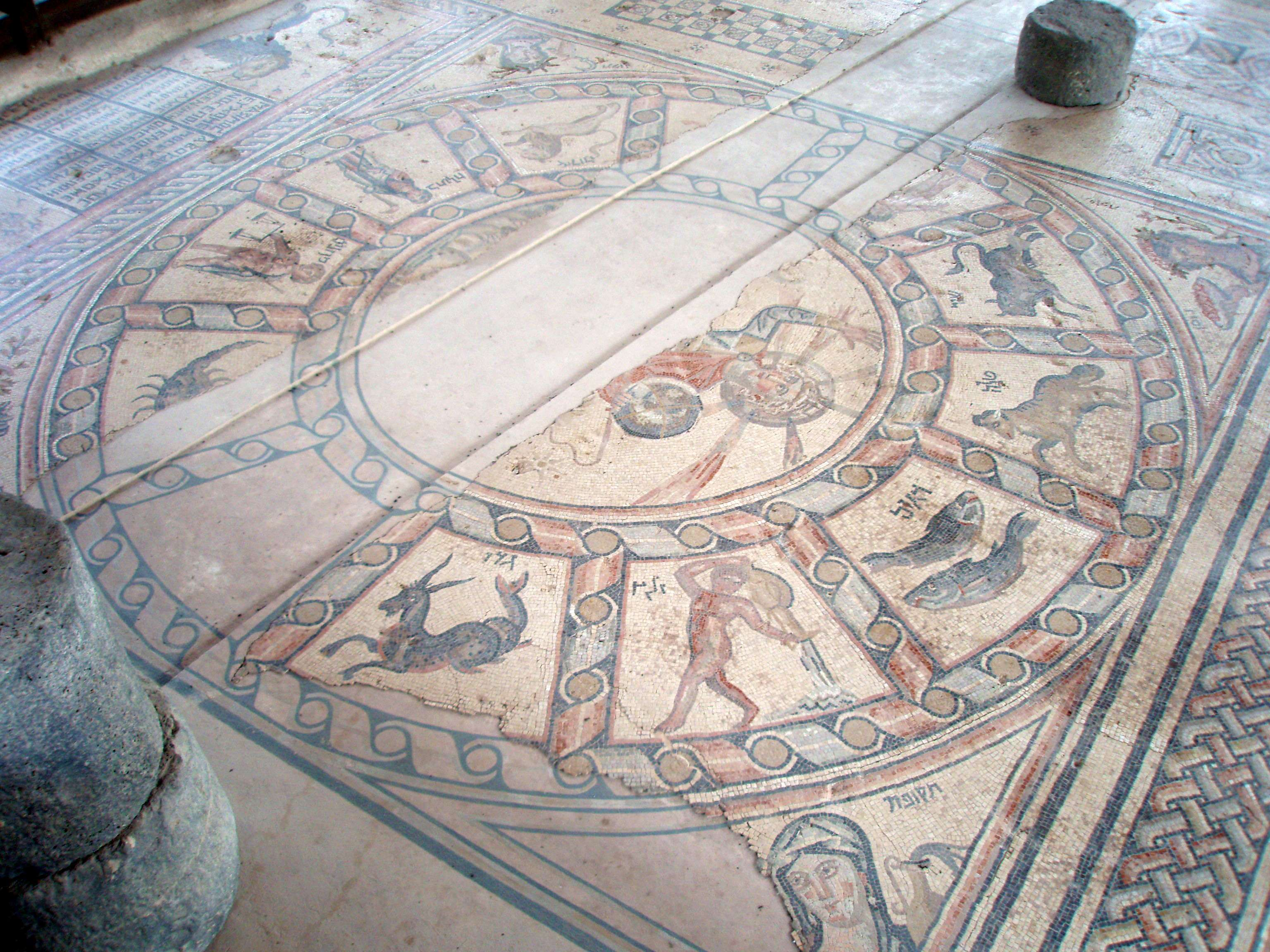
Hammat Tiberias synagogue floor

Tiberias was plagued by incursions by the radical Shi'ite Qarmatians at the beginning of the tenth century. During that period, the Academy of Eretz Israel left Tiberias for Jerusalem. Later in the same century, the region came under the control by the Fatimid Caliphate. By this time, Tiberias had experienced its last period of prosperity; dried fruit, oil, and wine had been exported to Cairo via the Via Maris, and the city was also known for its mat industry.

In 1033, Tiberias was again destroyed by an earthquake. A further earthquake in 1066 toppled the great mosque. Nasir-i Khusrou visited Tiberias in 1047, and describes a city with a "strong wall" which begins at the border of the lake and goes all around the town except on the water-side. Furthermore, he describes

numberless buildings erected in the very water, for the bed of the lake in this part is rock; and they have built pleasure houses that are supported on columns of marble, rising up out of the water. The lake is very full of fish. [] The Friday Mosque is in the midst of the town. At the gate of the mosque is a spring, over which they have built a hot bath. [] On the western side of the town is a mosque known as the Jasmine Mosque (Masjid-i-Yasmin). It is a fine building and in the middle part rises a great platform (dukkan), where they have their mihrabs (or prayer-niches). All round those they have set jasmine-shrubs, from which the mosque derives its name.

=== Crusader period ===
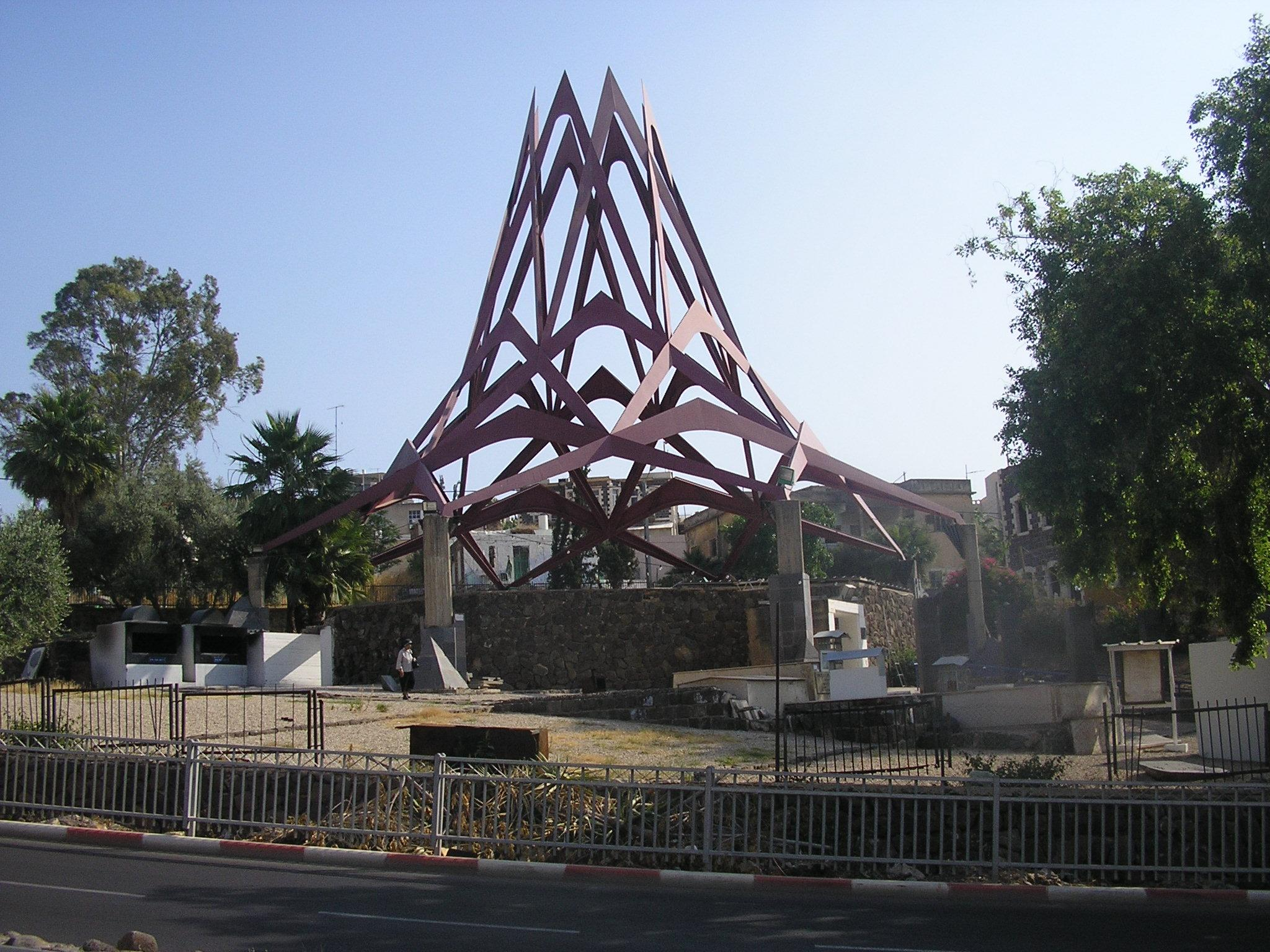
The tomb of Maimonides

During the First Crusade, Tiberias was occupied by the Franks soon after the capture of Jerusalem. The city was given in fief to Tancred, who made it his capital of the Principality of Galilee in the Kingdom of Jerusalem; the region was sometimes called the Principality of Tiberias, or the Tiberiad. In 1099, the original site of the city was abandoned, and settlement shifted north to the present location. St. Peter's Church, originally built by the Crusaders, is still standing today, although the building has been altered and reconstructed over the years.

In the late 12th century, Tiberias' Jewish community numbered 50 Jewish families, headed by rabbis, and at that time the best manuscripts of the Torah were said to be found there. In the 12th-century, the city was the subject of negative undertones in Islamic tradition. A hadith recorded by Ibn Asakir of Damascus (d. 1176) names Tiberias as one of the "four cities of hell." This could have been reflecting the fact that at the time, the town had a notable non-Muslim population.

In 1187, the Ayyubid sultan Saladin dispatched his son al-Afdal to send an envoy to Count Raymond III of Tripoli requesting safe passage through his fiefdom of Galilee and Tiberias. Raymond was obliged to grant the request under the terms of his treaty with Saladin. Saladin's force left Caesarea Philippi to engage the fighting force of the Knights Templar. The Templar force was destroyed in the encounter. Saladin besieged Tiberias on 2 July and entered the town within hours. The Crusader princess Eschiva and her men barricaded in the citadel of Tiberias in the center of town. On 4 July 1187, the Crusader army coming to relieve Tiberias, which included King Guy of Lusignan and Raymond III of Tripoli (Eschiva's husband), was routed by Saladin at the Battle of Hattin, 10 kilometres (6 miles) outside the city. The following day, the Tiberias citadel capitulated, Eschiva accepting Saladin's offer of safe passage. In 1190, upon hearing of the arrival of a large Crusader army under Frederick Barbarossa in Anatolia, Saladin preemptively had the citadel of Tiberias and several other forts dismantled.

Rabbi Moshe ben Maimon, (Maimonides) also known as Rambam, a leading Jewish legal scholar, philosopher and physician of his period, died in 1204 in Egypt and was later buried in Tiberias. His tomb is one of the city's important pilgrimage sites. Yakut, writing in the 1220s, described Tiberias as a small town, long and narrow. He also describes the "hot salt springs, over which they have built hammams which use no fuel." In 1241, control of the Galilee was transferred to the Crusaders as part of an agreement between Richard of Cornwall and Ayyubid sultan al-Salih Ayyub. The reestablished Principality of Galilee was assigned to Odo of Montbeliard, who rebuilt the citadel of Tiberias. The Crusaders again lost control of the city to the Ayyubids when it was captured by the emir Fakhr al-Din ibn al-Shaykh on 17 June 1247.

=== Mamluk period ===
The Mamluk Sultanate succeeded the Ayyubid Sultanate in 1260. In May 1295, the Mamluk governor of Safed, Faris al-Din Ilbaki, founded a maqam (funerary shrine) dedicated to Sukayna bint al-Husayn (great-granddaughter of Muhammad) on the south of Tiberias. The present structure was likely reconstructed in the late 19th century and was well-maintained prior to Israel's founding, though its present condition has deteriorated and it is used as a dump. The dedicatory inscription notes Tiberias at that time consisted of thirty feddans, two of which were endowed to the shrine's waqf, along with several named gardens around the village.

In 1325, Ibn Batuta described Tiberias as a ruin. Tiberias was noted as the center of a amal (subdistrict) of Safed province by the qadi (judge) of Safed Shams al-Din al-Uthmani in 1370 and the historian al-Qalqashandi in 1418.

=== Ottoman period ===
==== Early Ottoman period ====
The Ottoman Empire conquered Palestine from the Mamluks in 1516. Tiberias remained the center of a subdistrict (nahiye) of Safed district but its administrative jurisdiction was expanded to Nazareth, Kafr Kanna and part of Marj Bani Amir (Jezreel Valley), its northern limit formed by Wadi al-Rubudiyeh (Zalmon Stream). Kafr Kanna served as the sole market center of the Tiberias nahiye in the 16th century. During this period, Tiberias was a small village.

It was one of two places (the other being Meirun) in the Safed district where Jews visited on pilgrimage, specifically the tombs of Maimonides and Rabbi Meir. Italian rabbi Moses Bassola visited Tiberias in 1522, noting that "it was a big city ... and now it is ruined and desolate" with "ten or twelve" Muslim households. The area was dangerous due to the Bedouin and he paid the local governor for protection. In 1543 or 1596, Tiberias had 50 Muslim households and four bachelors. Its main crop was wheat and other crops included barley, fruit, fish, goats and beehives; the total revenue was 3,360 akçe.

As the Ottoman Empire expanded along the southern Mediterranean coast under Sultan Selim I, the Catholic Monarchs began establishing Inquisition commissions. Many conversos, (marranos and moriscos) and Sephardi Jews fled in fear to the Ottoman provinces and were encouraged by the sultan to settle in Palestine. In 1558, a Portuguese-born marrano, Doña Gracia, was granted tax collecting rights in Tiberias and its surrounding villages by Sultan Suleiman the Magnificent. She envisaged the town becoming a refuge for Jews and obtained a permit to establish Jewish autonomy there. In 1561, her nephew Joseph Nasi, Lord of Tiberias, encouraged Jews to settle and rebuild the city. Securing a firman from the sultan, he and Joseph ben Adruth rebuilt the city walls and lay the groundwork for a textile (silk) industry, planting mulberry trees and urging craftsmen to move there. Plans were made for Jews to move from the Papal States, but when the Ottomans and the Republic of Venice went to war, the plan was abandoned. Ottoman tax registers between 1528 and 1596 do not list a Jewish community in Tiberias. The historian al-Qaramani noted in 1598 that Nasi's walls were strongly built. A 1560 firman noted 2,000–3,000 Muslims, Christians and Jews annually visited the hot springs of Tiberias.

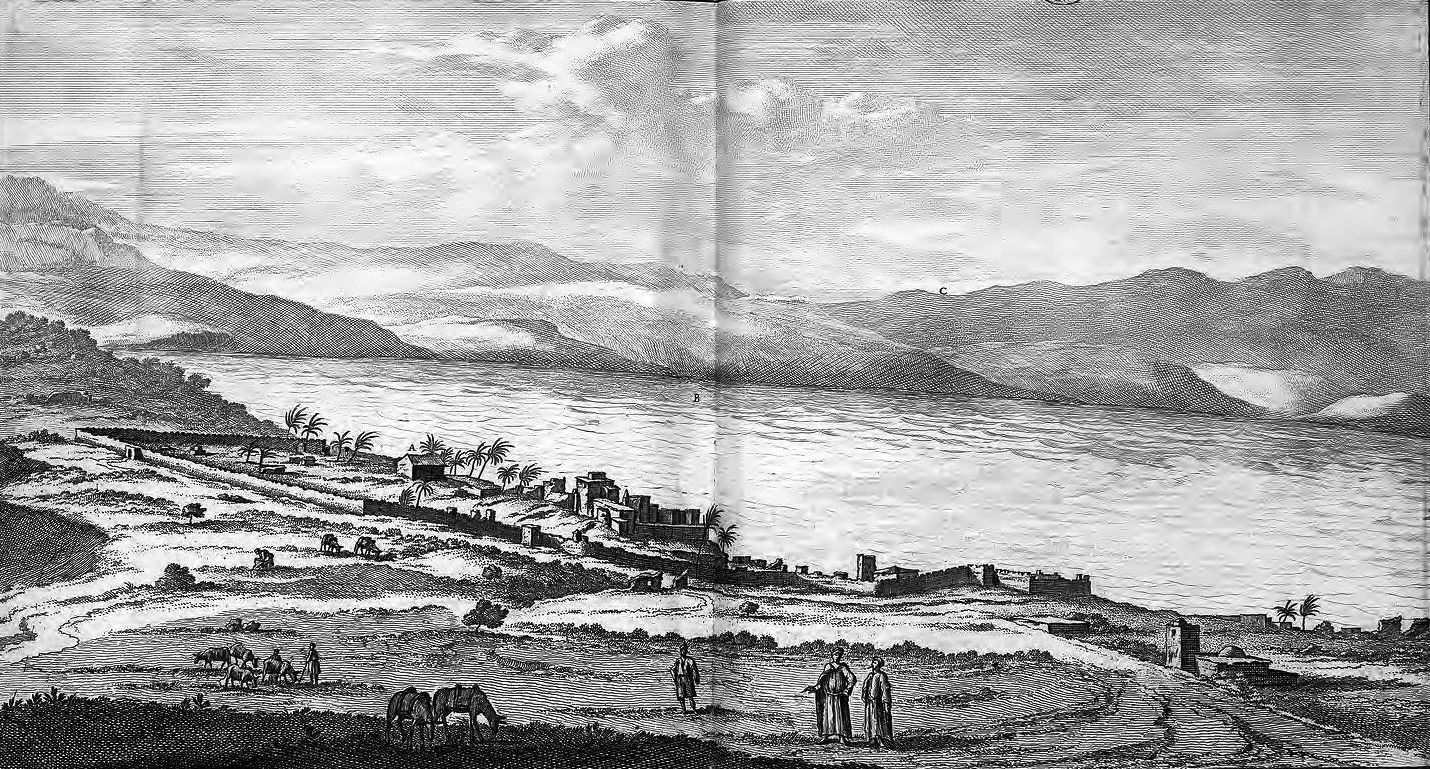
Sketch of Tiberias by Corneille Le Brun, 1679

Tiberias lacked importance during the 17th century. Between 1629 and 1634, Tiberias was visited by Jean de Thévenot, who described the ruins of a large "chateau" along the lake shore. Likewise, the Nazareth-based Franciscan Eugène Roger noted the same remains of a citadel and further mentioned its moat filled by the waters of the lake. According to Zvi Razi and Eliot Braun, this structure was the former Crusader citadel. The 1660 destruction of Tiberias by the Druze resulted in abandonment of the city by its Jewish community. Unlike Tiberias, the nearby city of Safed recovered from its destruction, and was not entirely abandoned, remaining an important Jewish center in Galilee. Corneille Le Brun sketched Tiberias in 1679, showing the large citadel on the shoreline rising high above the town's perimeter walls.

==== Zaydani period ====
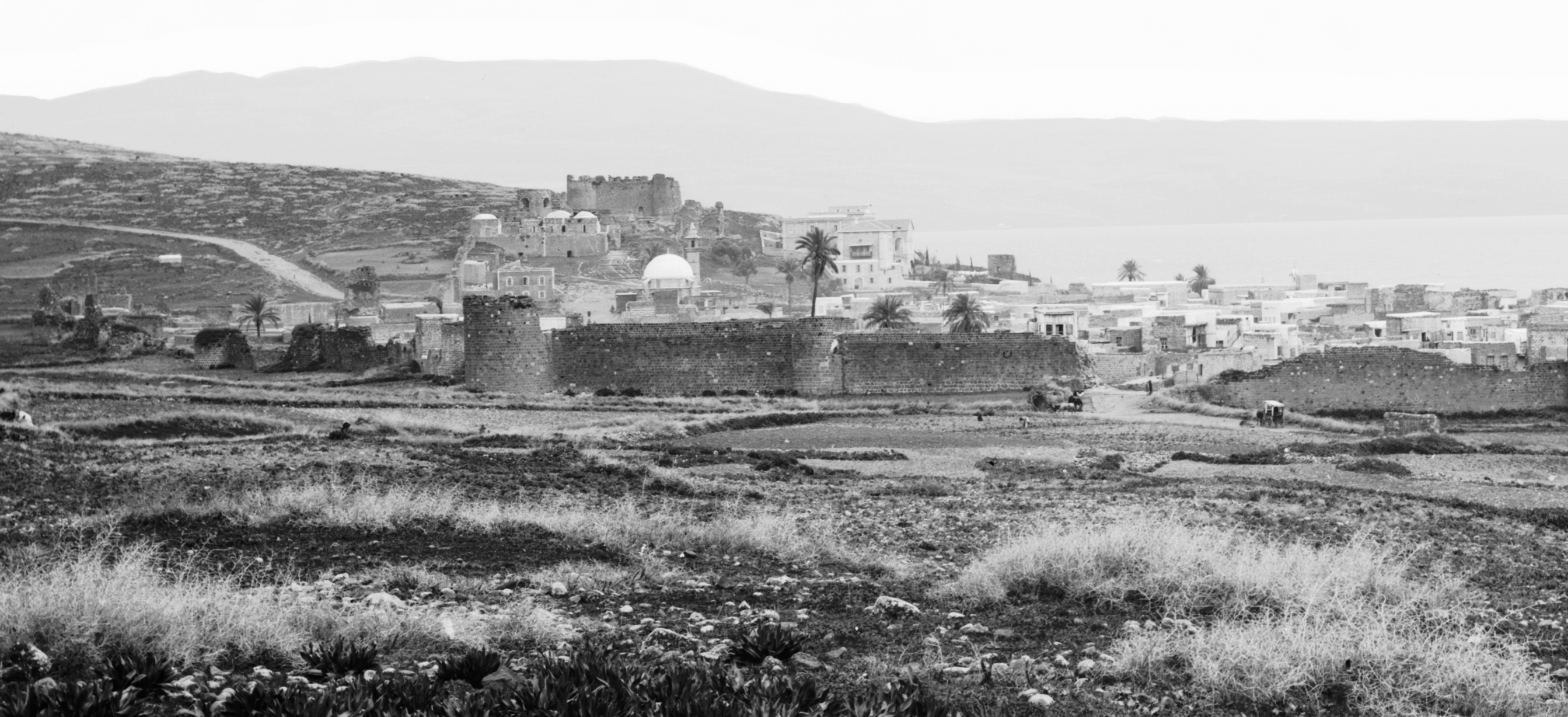
1914 photo of Tiberias, showing its 18th-century walls and towers. Salibi al-Daher's citadel is on the northern hill overlooking the town

In the late 17th century, the Zayadina, a clan of Bedouin origin, settled in the Tiberias area as cultivators. The Zaydani sheikh Umar and his father served as multazims (tax farmers) there, subleasing the tax farms from the Druze emirs of Mount Lebanon (i.e. the Ma'ns and their successors the Shihabs). In 1707, Umar's son Daher al-Umar killed a Tiberian man during a brawl and the family fled to nearby Arraba under protection of the dominant Bedouins of the region, the Banu Saqr. Shortly before 1720, Tiberias was described by Dutch travelers as a rectangular-shaped town with "high but badly built walls" and two gates, one by the shore and the other "closed off with stones". The shoreside gate was adjacent to the only noteworthy home, that of the sheikh; half the town space was occupied by smaller houses and generally the town was "little more than a collection of ruins". About one hundred Bedouin led by a powerful sheikh, Jabr (leader of the Saqr), encamped outside the walls. (Note: The Dutch described him as the most powerful Bedouin sheikh of the region and referred to him as Jabr ibn Dahir. The leader of the Saqr in the early 18th century was named Jabr or Rashid al-Jabr by the chronicler Mikha'il Sabbagh.) With the Saqr's support, Daher took over Tiberias in c. 1730, expelling its mutasallim (appointed governor) and gaining official appointment as its multazim from Sidon's governor. (Note: In 1660, the Safed Sanjak was separated from Damascus Eyalet and formed part of the newly established Sidon Eyalet.)

Daher made Tiberias his base, fortifying it and gathering there some 200 Zaydani horsemen under the command of his cousin Muhammad al-Ali of Damun. From Tiberias, Daher expanded his tax farms and territories throughout the Galilee. The governor of Damascus considered Daher's fortification of Tiberias a threat to the trade and communications route between Damascus and Nablus and by extension to Egypt, as well as a potential impediment to the governor's annual tax collection tour in Palestine. The Zayadina frequently provoked the Damascene authorities, raiding areas of the province throughout the 1730s and intervening on behalf of the Sardiyya chiefs of the Syrian Bedouin amid their disputes with the governor, hosting them in Tiberias. In 1738, the governor, Sulayman Pasha al-Azm, launched an abortive assault against Tiberias with express imperial orders to raze its fortifications. Afterward, Daher strengthened the town's fortification in anticipation of further assaults. He constructed a tower north of the walls which he fitted with four European cannons, buttressed the old walls, and the secured the water supply and provisions. Archaeological surveys indicate the walls, several sections of which survive, were 8 meters (26 ft) high and had twelve projecting, two-story, round towers; some of the lower floors contained rooms while the upper floors contained firing chambers with three to five gunholes.

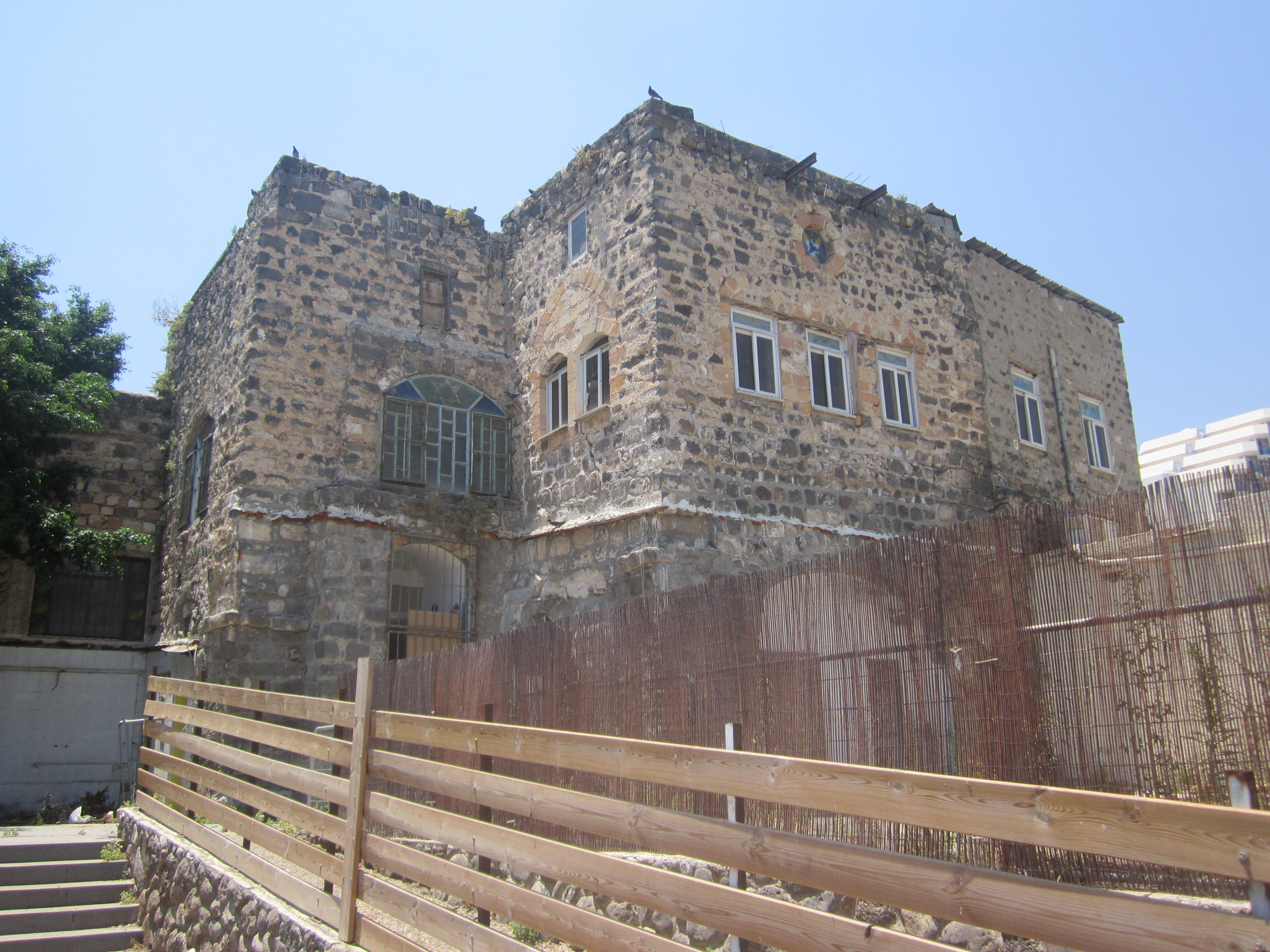
The synagogue of Chaim Abulafia

Richard Pococke visited Tiberias in 1737, describing it as one-quarter mile long and one-half mile wide, open to the lake and walled on the other three sides. He witnessed Daher's fortification works. Besides its walls, it was effectively a village containing a few non-contiguous houses, the ruins of the substantial (Crusader-era) castle and a rectangular church dedicated to St. Peter (which was annually visited by the Catholic clergy of Nazareth on his feast day). Pococke described being hosted for dinner and lodging, both on the rooftop of Daher's home for the cool air, as was customary. He noted that the villagers kept their numerous cattle and donkeys within the walls to prevent their theft, fished with cast nets in the lake at their discretion, and took boats to gather wood from across the lake.

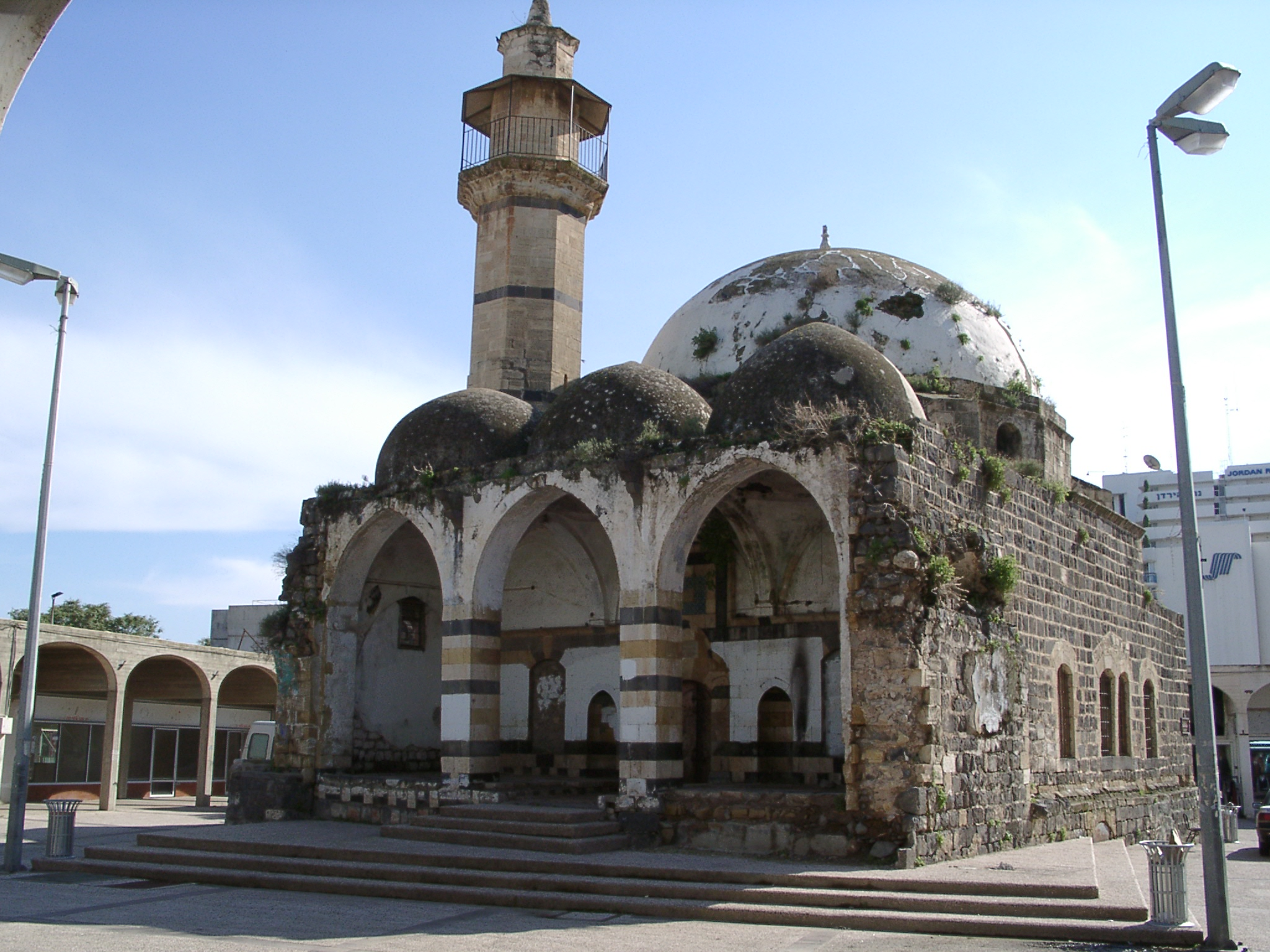
The mosque of Daher al-Umar

While Daher had traded with the Damascenes before his rise, his first dealing with the French cotton merchants of Acre was in Tiberias in 1730, when he negotiated a debt settlement on behalf of his brother Sa'd al-Umar. As he consolidated his hold over Acre's hinterland, he gained control of the area's cotton crop and gradually monopolized its lucrative trade with the French. To stimulate commerce in Tiberias, Daher made contact with Chaim Abulafia of Smyrna in 1738, inviting him and his followers to settle in the town. They arrived in 1740 to a reception by Daher, who alotted them lands to establish their own quarter. He assisted them in their construction of a synagogue and school and exempted them from taxes for a three-year period as an incentive to encourage their trading activities. In a eulogy for Abulafia in 1745, the rabbi's son-in-law noted the prosperity of the Smyrna Jews in Tiberias. The synagogue still stands. Muslims also moved to Tiberias during this period. In the 1740s, Daher founded the mosque called after him in the center of town. Daher or his family likely founded the Sea Mosque of Tiberias as well. In 1743, Daher's brother Yusuf built a hammam, but it is no longer extant.

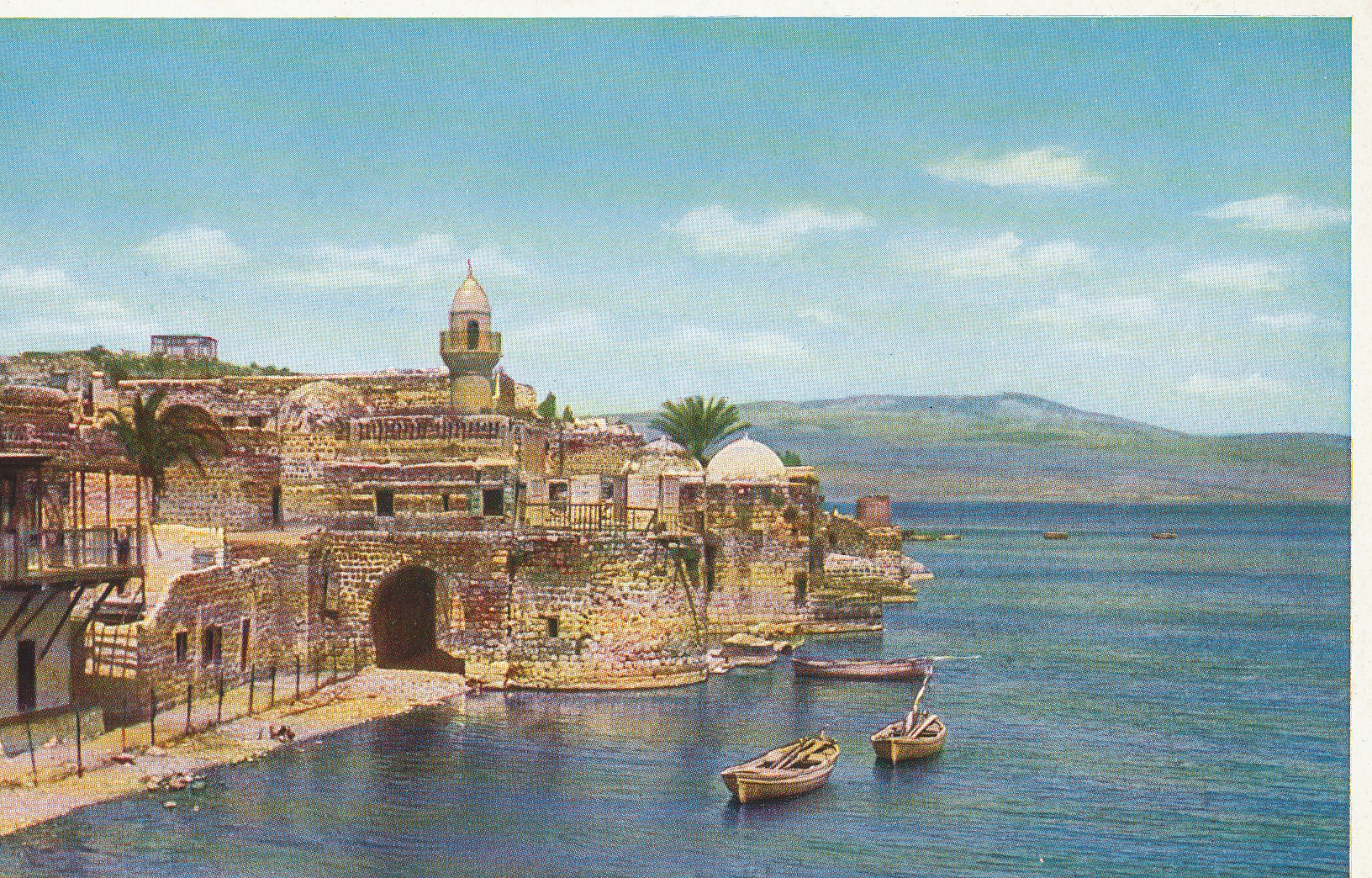
The 18th-century Sea Mosque (Jami' al-Bahri) of Tiberias, 1920s

In 1742, Sulayman Pasha relaunched his imperially-sanctioned attempt to eliminate Daher and destroy Tiberias, obtaining specialized equipment and experts for the task and mustering a large army from the Palestinian districts of Damascus province. Daher had been forewarned of the impending assault by the Tiberian Jews, who had been informed by their Damascene coreligionists. Sulayman Pasha besieged Tiberias but could not breach its defenses and temporarily withdrew toward the end of the year. Daher used his French mercantile partners and the Tiberian Jews to lobby the sultan for a pardon but to no avail. Sulayman Pasha returned in 1743 with a stronger army but died suddenly in August and his troops disbanded. Daher moved his attention westward, taking up headquarters in Deir Hanna by the mid-1740s, then Acre in 1750. The political imortance of Tiberias receded with Daher's relocation to Acre and economic activity slowed.

Control of Tiberias was transferred to Daher's eldest son Salibi. In 1754, Salibi constructed a roughly 500 square meters (5,400 ft^{2}) citadel with four towers on the hilltop fortification Daher had built off the town's northeastern wall. The citadel is extant and, as of 2001, its upper floor was operated as a restaurant, while its lower floor contained an art gallery. Salibi and his brothers Ahmad and Uthman barricaded in the citadel during their abortive rebellion against Daher in 1761 (or 1765). The 1759 earthquake heavily damaged its walls and buildings, which remained in a state of disrepair during the Giovanni Mariti's visit in 1767. After Salibi was killed on a campaign for his father in 1773, control of Tiberias passed to Ahmad, controlled his territory in Jabal Ajlun from there. When Daher was eliminated in an Ottoman imperial campaign, the Zayadina resisted the new (Acre-based) governor of Sidon, Ahmad Pasha al-Jazzar, from their fortified holdings, including Tiberias. Soon after their main stronghold at Deir Hanna fell in July 1776, Tiberias capitulated.

==== Jazzari period ====
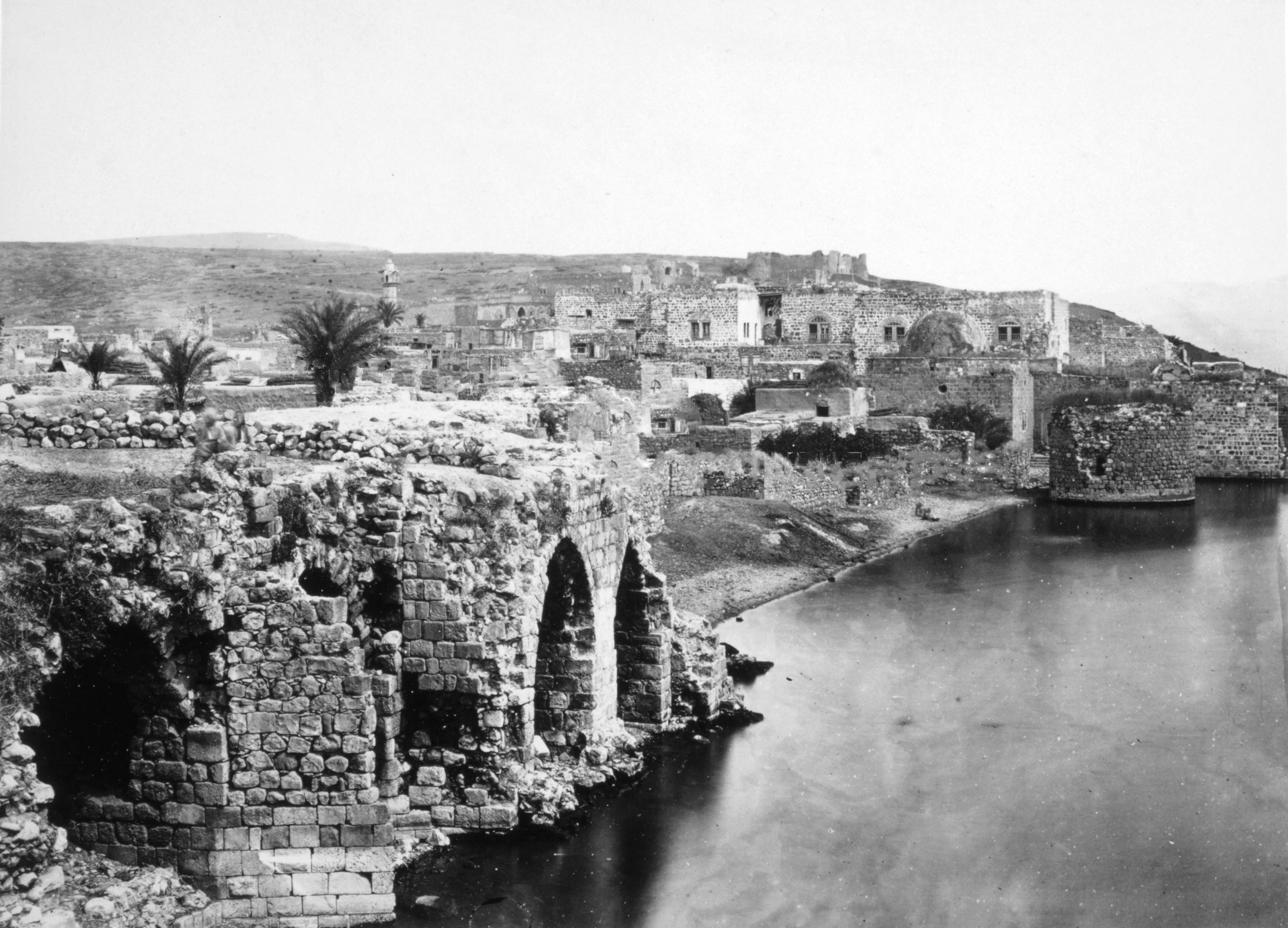
Tiberas, 1862

Al-Jazzar maintained the fortifications of Tiberias, despite imperial orders to raze them; as the town controlled the key entries from which Bedouin from the Syrian Desert crossed into northern Palestine, al-Jazzar considered a strongly fortified Tiberias a strategic asset to prevent Bedouin invasions. To ensure the town's loyalty, al-Jazzar replaced the local garrison with permanent 'Turkish' troops (50 infantrymen and 300 cavalry), though at least 200 of these were ethnic Afghans. He equipped it with additional cannon, putting it on military par with Beirut. Tiberias continued to receive an influx of rabbis who re-established it as a center for Jewish learning. In 1780, many Polish Jews settled in the town. Volney estimated a population of 100 families in 1783. Al-Jazzar constructed a domed bathhouse in Tiberias in 1800 and it remains extant.

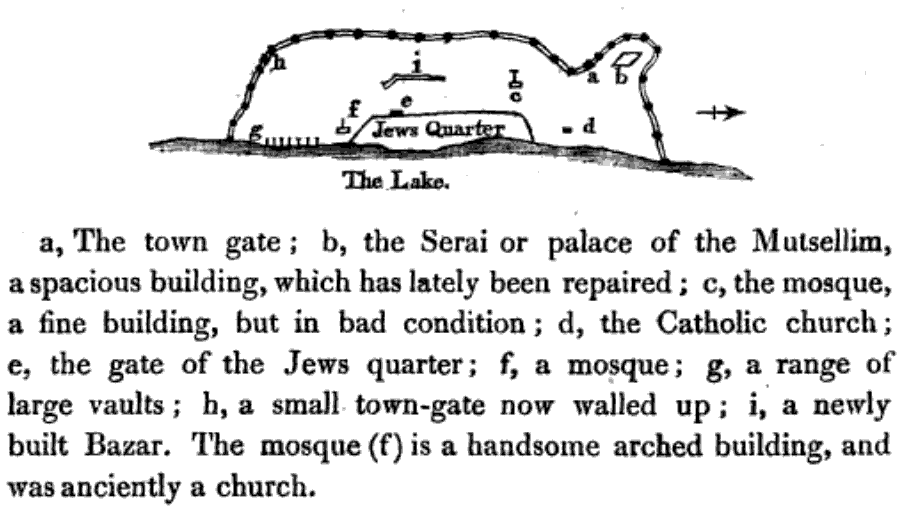
Johann Ludwig Burckhardt's sketch of Tiberias, published in 1822. Burckhardt noted that the a quarter of the population was Jewish, and had originated in Poland, Spain, North Africa and other parts of Syria.

In 1812, when Jazzar's mamluk successor Sulayman Pasha governed, Johann Ludwig Burckhardt observed that Tiberias had recovered its physical and political standing and was an administrative center with a dozen villages in its orbit. Its walls stood twenty feet high with several towers, some built in the lake and, like the town's buildings, were constructed of basalt blocks. He noted its 200–300-strong garrison, most of whose families resided in town (the Afghans having disbanded after al-Jazzar's death in 1804). He estimated its population at 4,000, three quarters of whom were Arab Muslims and most of the remainder Jews (120 to 200 families, Syrians and Ashkenazis, all living in the Jewish quarter along the lakeshore), with a small number of Christian families. German theologian Johann Martin Scholz estimated 300 Christian families, with Muslims and Jews forming the bulk of the population, the Jews being mainly poor Poles living on charity. There were three synagogues, that of Abulafia, the better built Ashkenazi, and the large and ornate Portuguese. The local advisers of Sulayman Pasha's successor, Abdullah Pasha, protested that his Jewish chief adviser, Haim Farhi, had allowed "thousands" of Jews to settle in Tiberias, though these figures were exaggerated.

==== Egyptian interregenum ====
In 1831, the army of Egypt's practically independent governor Muhammad Ali, led by his son Ibrahim Pasha, occupied Syria. They attempted comprehensive modernization reforms, including around taxation and conscription. In opposition to these measures, a countrywide peasants revolt in Palestine broke out in 1834. The revolt was suppressed and the leaders of the Arab community in Tiberias, the sheikhs of the Tabari family, were exiled to Jaffa and Egypt. Rabbi Joseph Schwarz noted that the "Tiberias Jews suffered the least" during this revolt compared to their coreligionists.

Also in 1834, W. E. Fitzmaurice wrote that Tiberias suffered heavy rains and snow, which caused great damage; except for the synagogue, the lower floors of all houses were flooded with water up to two or three feet. He added that most of the population were Polish Jews, with few Muslims. 600–700 people, including 100 Muslim men and 500 Jews died as a result of the 1837 Galilee earthquake, which caused severe damage to the walls and collapsed several houses. The population count the next year was about 100 Muslims, 100–150 Greek Catholics, and 150–200 Jews (only men counted). German nobleman Hermann Pückler-Muskau reported in c. 1839 that half the residents were killed and the town remained ruined, many of the survivors living in wood huts. Edward Robinson, in the summer of 1838, noted the distinct basaltic architecture of Tiberias and that in its surroundings were planted mainly wheat, barley, tobacco, quality melons, millet and grapes, with scattered indigo, oleander and palm trees. The sole water supply for the residents was the lake, which contained many species of fish in abundance. Bathhouses built in the hot springs outside the walls remained in use and the natural springs were visited in summertime by people from across Syria as a therapy for arthritis and debility. One of the bathhouses was built by Ibrahim Pasha in 1833 or 1835 and was larger than al-Jazzar's; it remains in use as a hammam today. Egyptian rule ended in 1841.

==== Later Ottoman period ====
An American expedition reported that Tiberias was still in a state of disrepair in 1847–1848. Rabbi Haim Shmuel Hacohen Konorti, born in Spain in 1792, settled in Tiberias at the age of 45 and was a driving force in the restoration of the city.

In 1842, there were about 3,900 inhabitants, around a third of whom were Jews, the rest being Muslims and a few Christians. In 1850, Tiberias contained three synagogues which served the Sephardi community, which consisted of 80 families, and the Ashkenazim, numbering about 100 families. It was reported that the Jewish inhabitants of Tiberias enjoyed more peace and security than those of Safed to the north.

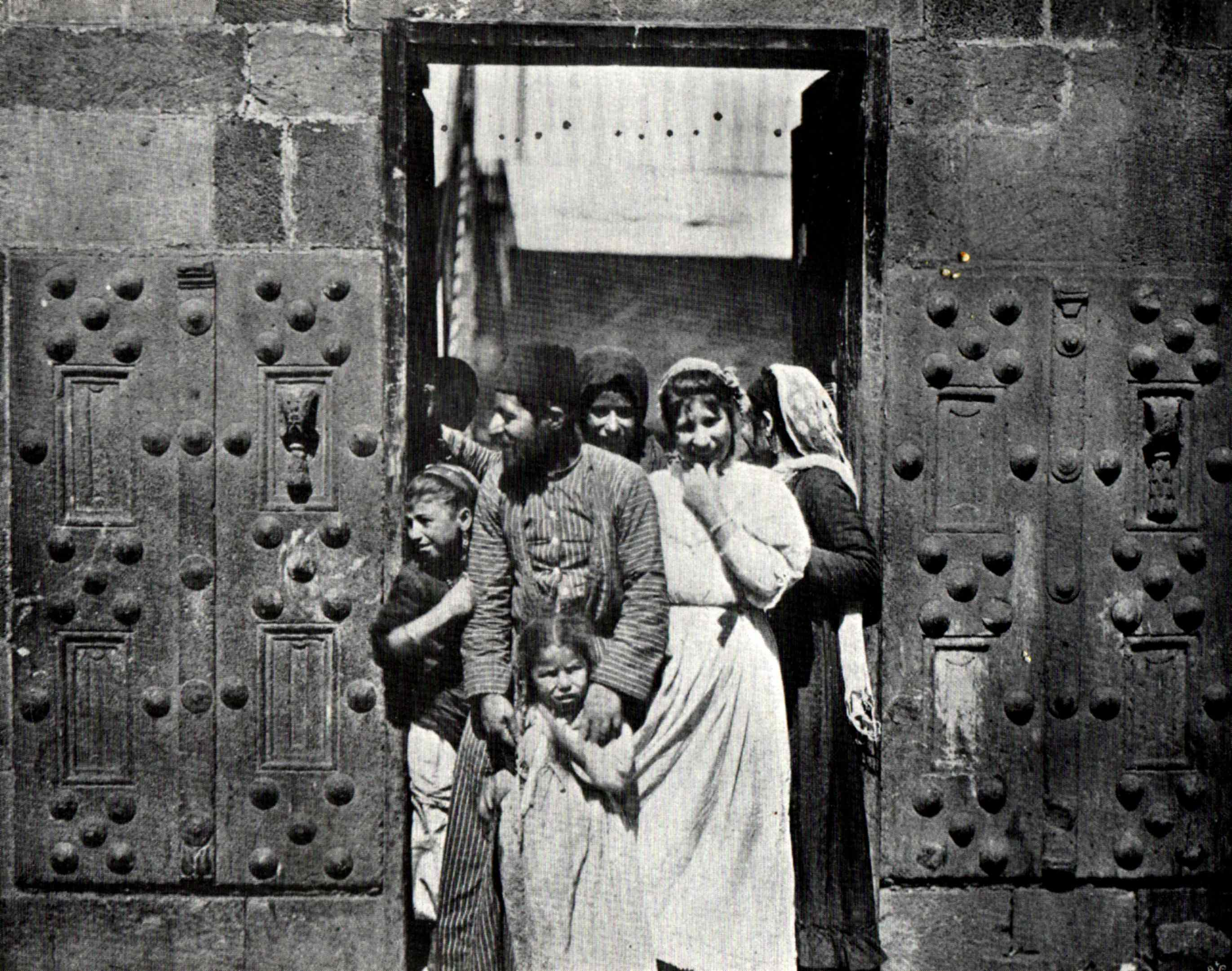
Jewish house in Tiberias, 1893

In the 19th century, the Greek Orthodox Patriarchate of Jerusalem purchased lands that were incorporated into its growing network of rural estates. In 1863, Christians and Muslims made up three-quarters of the population (2,000 to 4,000). A population list from about 1887 showed that Tiberias had a population of 3,640: 2,025 Jews, 30 Latins, 215 Catholics, 15 Greek Catholics, and 1,355 Muslims. In 1901, the Jews of Tiberias numbered about 2,000 of the town's 3,600 residents. By 1912, the population reached 6,500, including 4,500 Jews, 1,600 Muslims and 400 Christians.

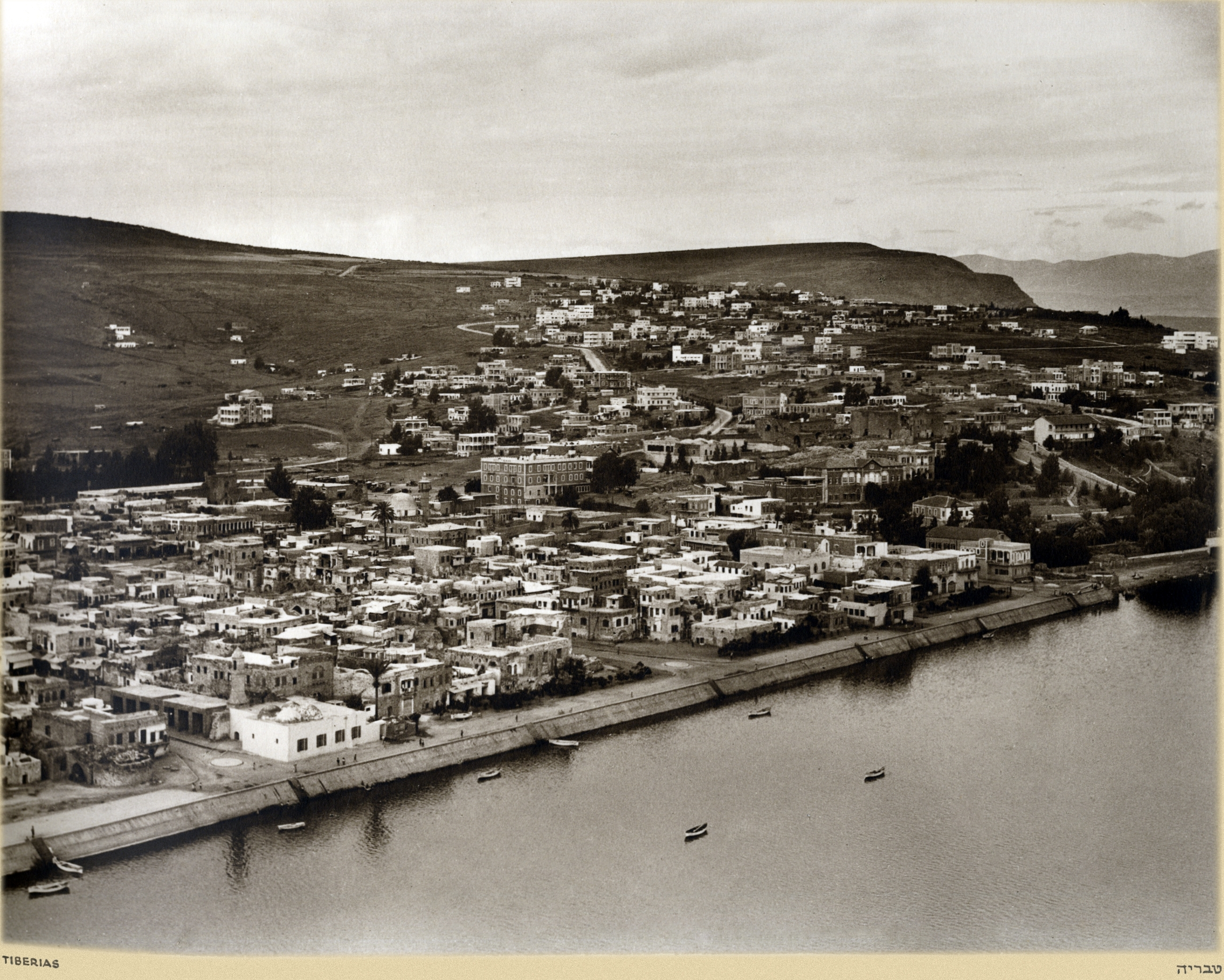
Tiberias 1937, Dr. Torrance's hospital centre of photograph

=== British Mandate ===
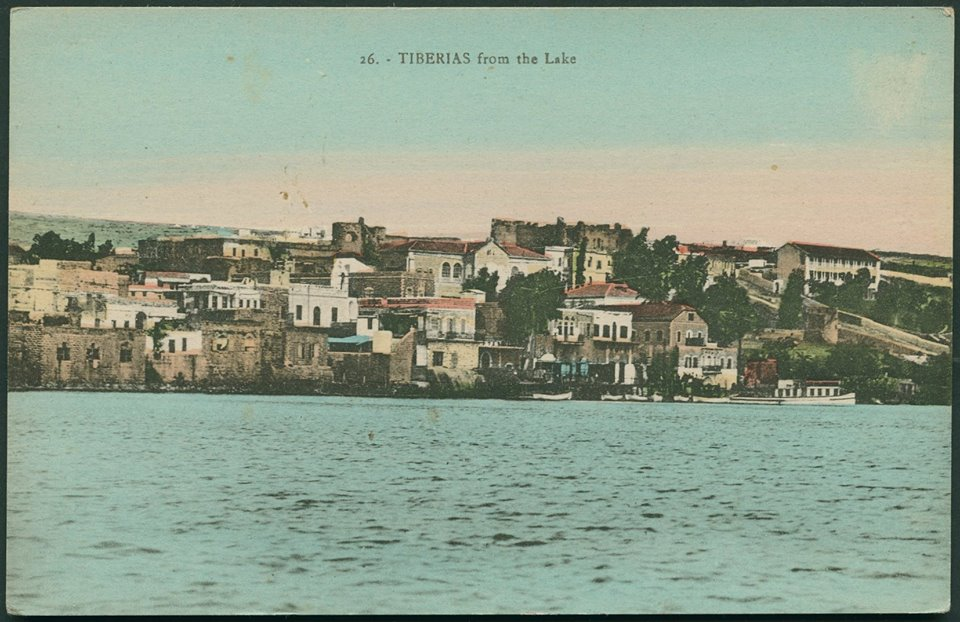
Postcard of Tiberias, by Karimeh Abbud, ca 1925

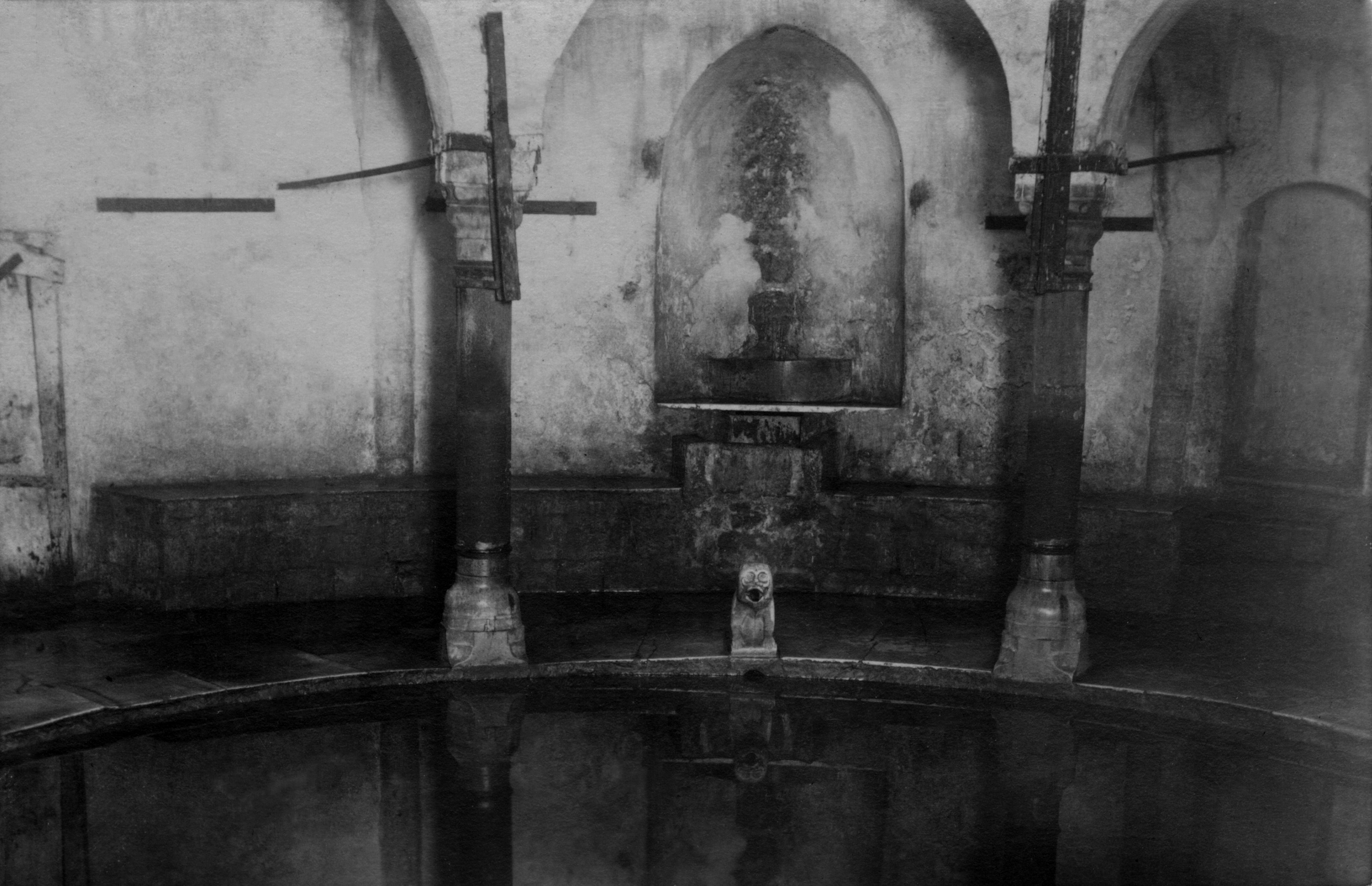
Hot springs in Tiberias 1924, Younes & Soraya Nazrian library, University of Haifa digital collections

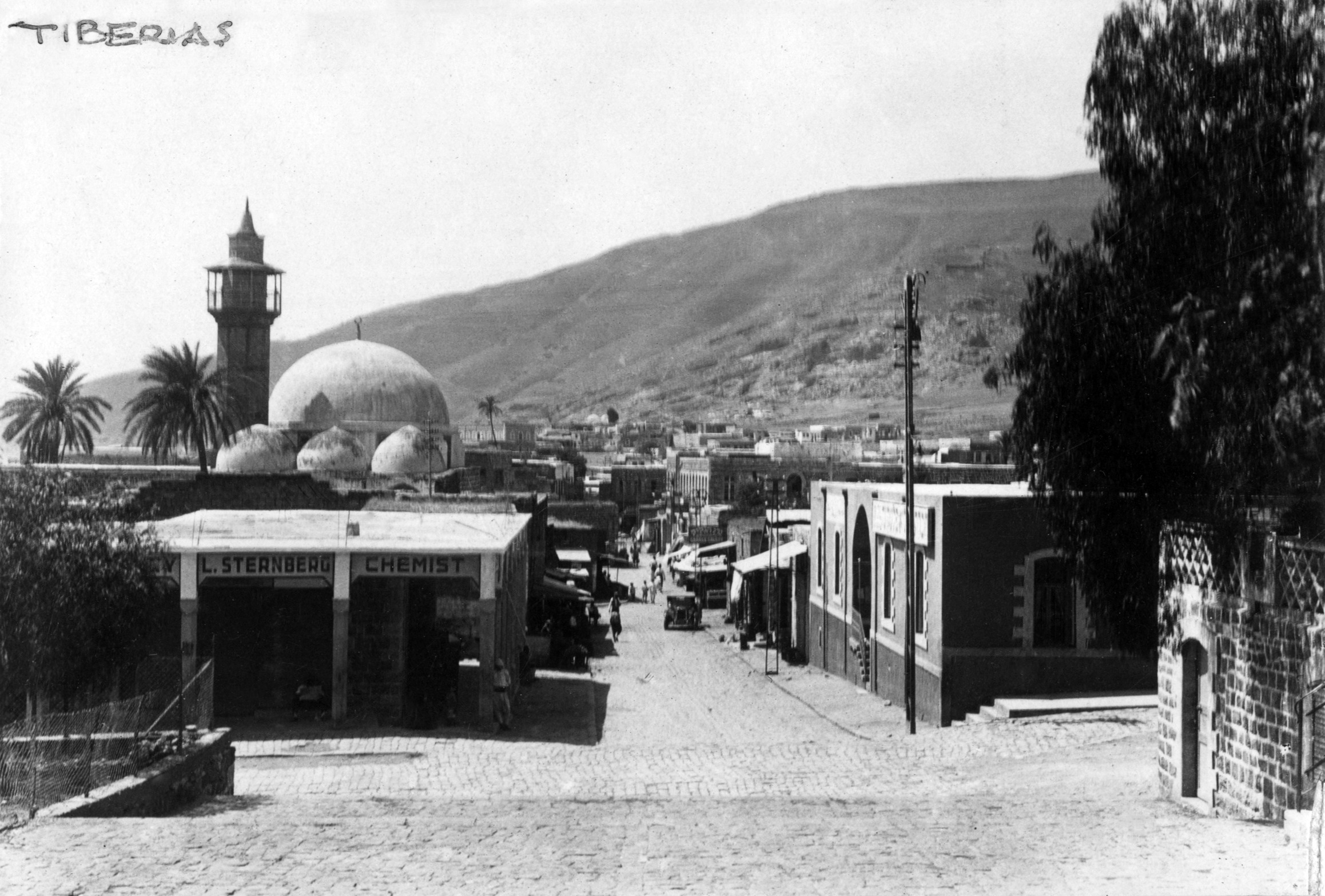
Tiberias main road, 1925, Younes & Soraya Library digital collections, University of Haifa

In the 1922 census of Palestine conducted by the British Mandate authorities, Tiberias had a population of 6,950 inhabitants, consisting of 4,427 Jews, 2,096 Muslims, 422 Christians, and five others. Initially the relationship between Arabs and Jews in Tiberias was good, with few incidents occurring in the Nebi Musa riots in 1920 and the Arab riots throughout Palestine in 1929. The first modern spa was built in 1929. There were 5,381 Jews, 2,645 Muslims, 565 Christians and ten 'others' in the 1931 census.

The landscape of the modern town was shaped by the great flood of 15 May 1934. Deforestation on the slopes above the town combined with the fact that the city had been built as a series of closely packed houses and buildings – usually sharing walls – built in narrow roads paralleling and closely hugging the shore of the lake. Flood waters carrying mud, stones, and boulders rushed down the slopes and filled the streets and buildings with water so rapidly that many people did not have time to escape; 35 people were killed. The city rebuilt on the slopes and the British Mandatory government planted the Swiss Forest on the slopes above the town to hold the soil and prevent similar disasters from recurring. A new seawall was constructed, moving the shoreline several yards out from the former shore. In October 1938, Arab militants killed 19 Jews in Tiberias during the 1936–39 Arab revolt in Palestine. By 1945, the population of Tiberias increased to 6,000 Jews, 4,540 Muslims, 760 Christians with ten 'others'.

==== 1948 war ====
Between 8–9 April 1948, sporadic shooting broke out between the Jewish and Arab neighborhoods of Tiberias. Arab Liberation Army and irregular forces attacked and closed the Rosh Pinna road, isolating the northern Jewish settlements. On 10 April, the Haganah launched a mortar barrage against the Arab residential areas in Tiberias, killing some Arab residents. The local National Committee refused the offer of the Arab Liberation Army to take over defense of the city, but a small contingent of outside irregulars moved in. Some fled in the wake of news of the Deir Yassin massacre.

During 10–17 April, the Haganah attacked the city and refused to negotiate a truce, while the British refused to intervene. Newly arrived Arab refugees from Nasir ad-Din told of the civilians there being killed, news which brought panic to the residents of Tiberias. The British authorities had not intervened in Nasir ad-Din, and told the residents of Tiberias that they could offer no protection of the Arab neighbourhoods beyond 22 April.

The Arab population of Tiberias (6,000 residents or 47.5% of the population) was then evacuated by the British forces on 18 April 1948.

The Jewish population looted the Arab areas and had to be suppressed by force by the Haganah and Jewish police, who killed or injured several looters. On 30 December 1948, when David Ben-Gurion was staying in Tiberias, James Grover McDonald, the United States ambassador to Israel, requested to meet with him. McDonald presented a British ultimatum for Israeli troops to leave the Sinai peninsula, Egyptian territory. Israel rejected the ultimatum.

Following the war, the displaced Arab residents were refused re-entry, resulting in the city becoming almost exclusively Jewish in population. After the war had ended, a large number of Jewish immigrants to Israel settled in Tiberias.

==== Destruction of the old city ====
During the months after the occupation of the city, a large part of the buildings of the old city in Tiberias was destroyed, and this for various reasons - problems of hygiene, rickety construction, and the fear that the Arabs would return to the city, when it became known that this was a requirement of Jordan as part of the negotiations conducted in Rhodes. Finally, the authorities acceded to the initiative of the Jewish National Fund, Yosef Nahmani, who argued that the houses of the Old City should be demolished, despite the opposition of Mayor Shimon Dahan.

The destruction began in the summer of 1948 and continued until the first months of 1949. A visit by David Ben-Gurion to the city brought an end to the destruction, after 477 out of 696 houses were destroyed according to official estimates. After the destruction remained the remains of the wall and the citadel, several houses on the outskirts of the city, as well as the two mosques that operated in the city. The area stood abandoned for decades, until operations began to restore it in the 1970s.

=== State of Israel ===
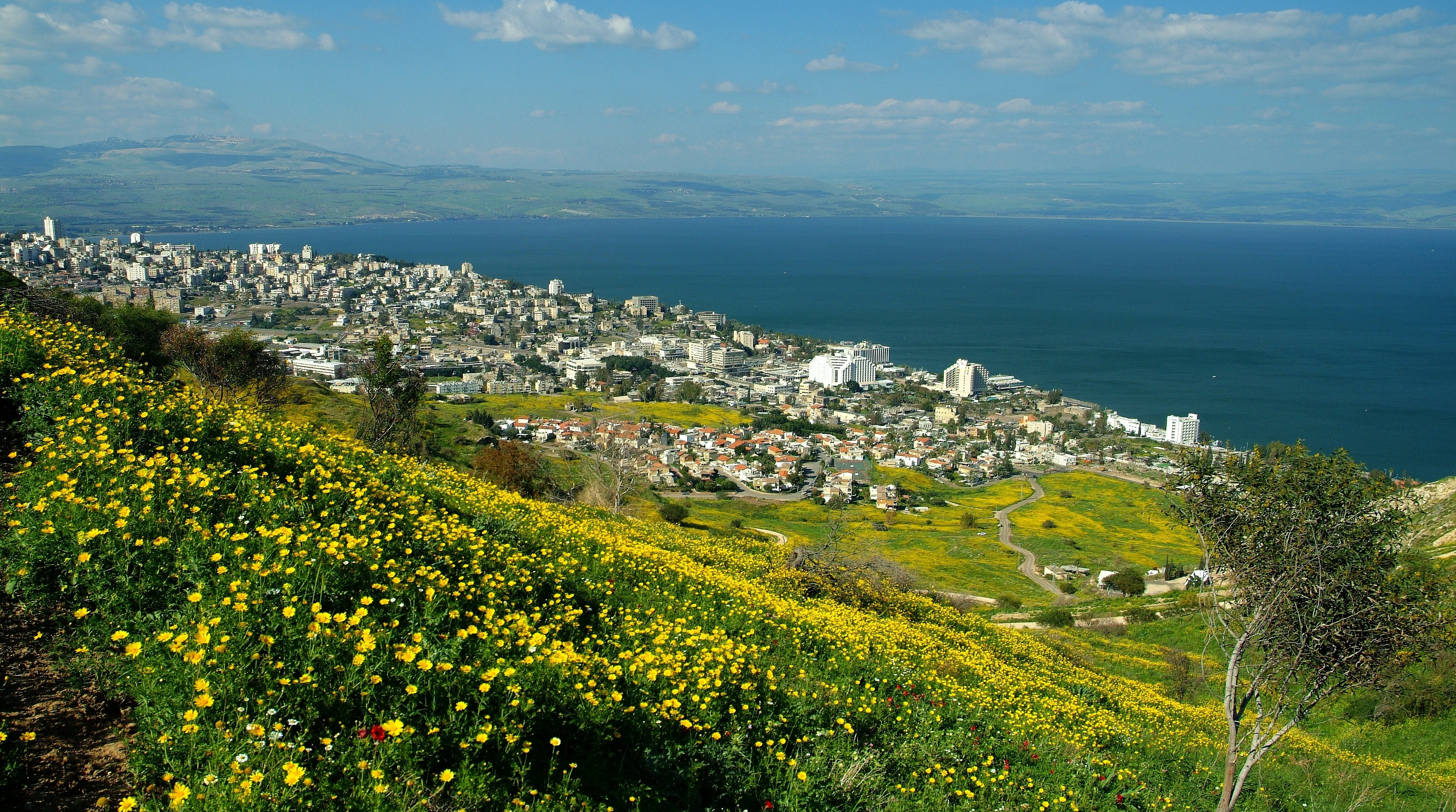
Tiberias and the Sea of Galilee

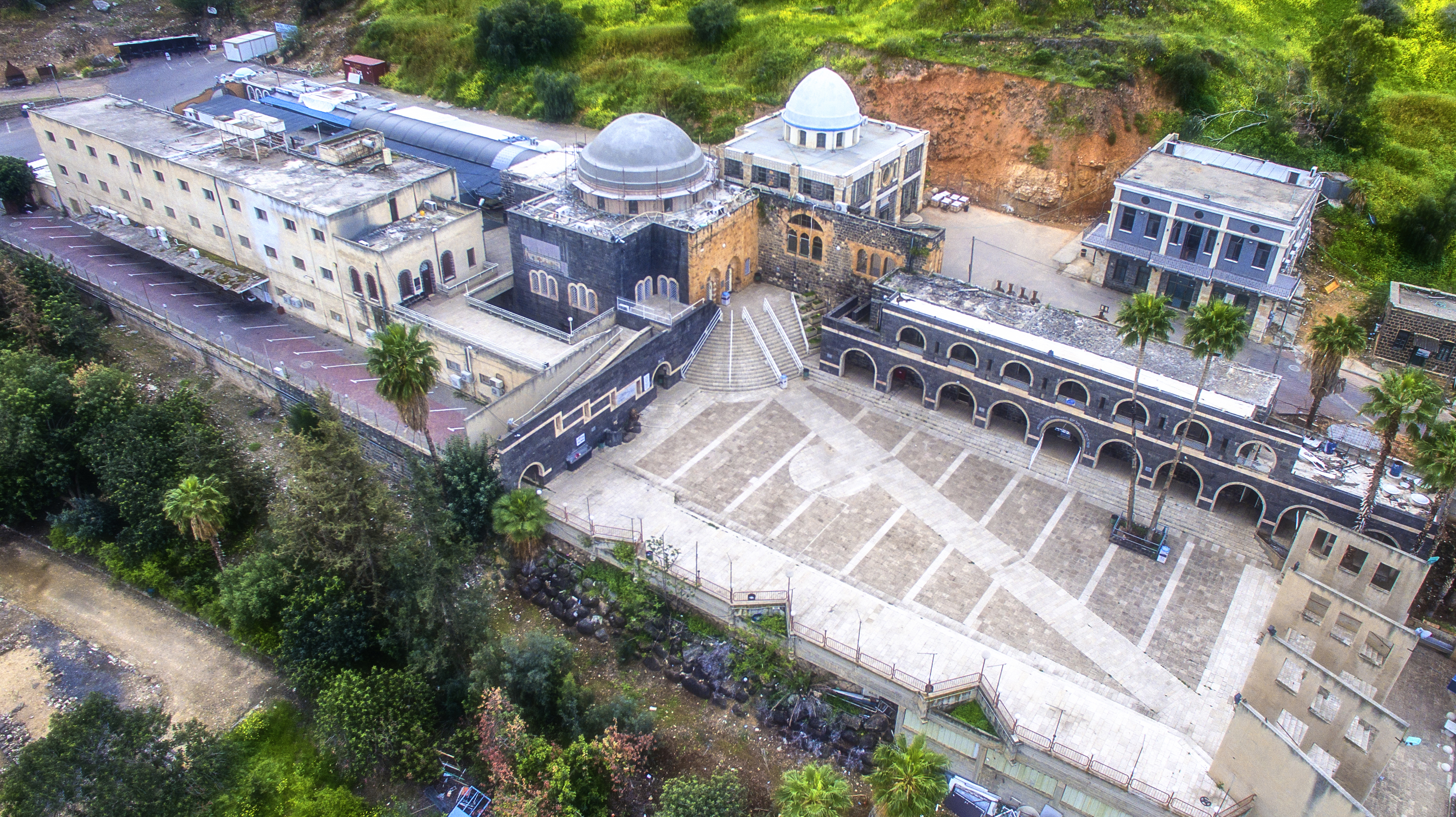
Tomb of Rabbi Meir Baal HaNes

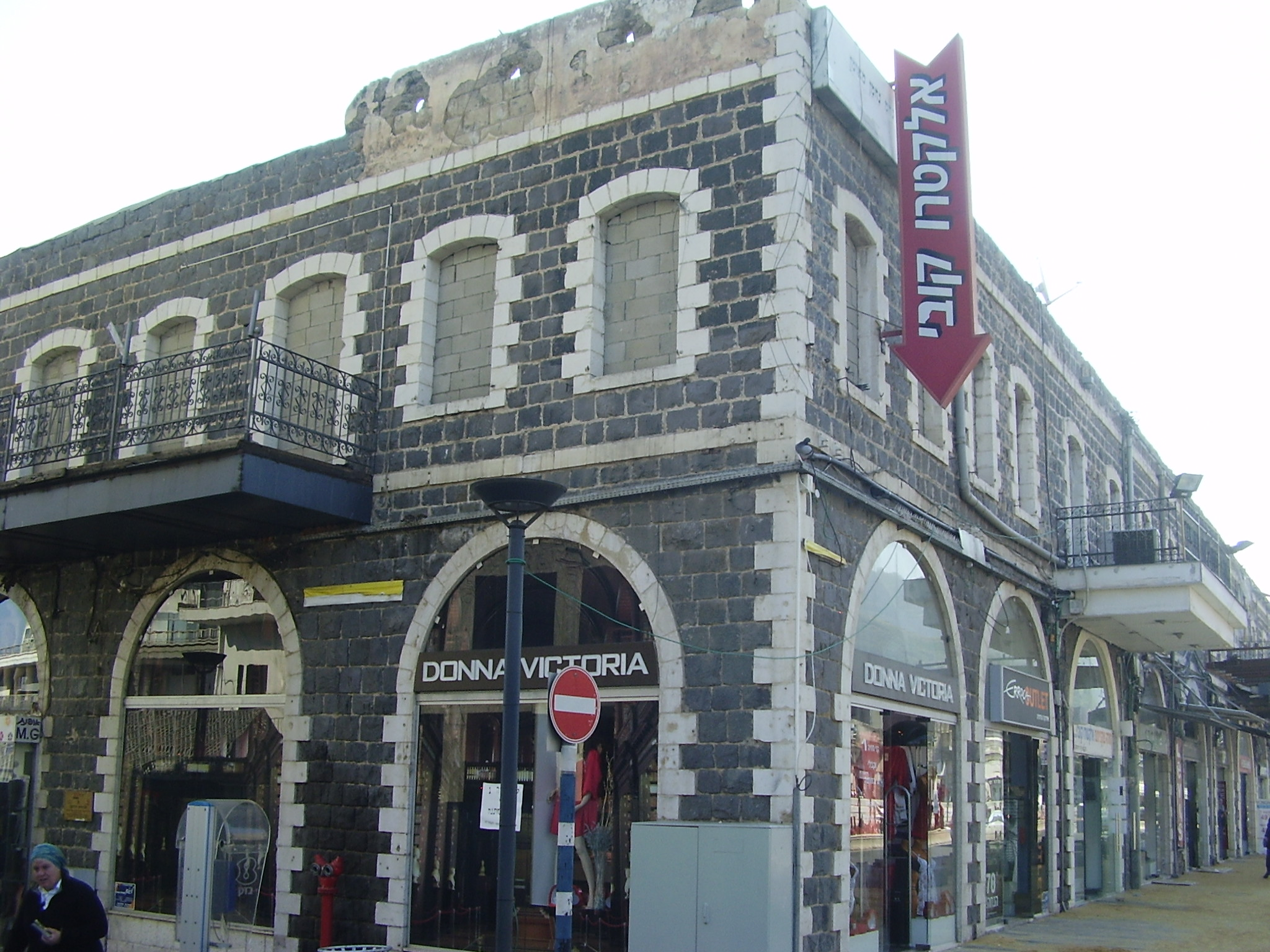
Black basalt buildings in Tiberias

The city of Tiberias has been almost entirely Jewish since 1948. Many Sephardic and Mizrahi Jews settled in the city, following the Jewish exodus from Arab countries in the late 1940s and early 1950s. Over time, government housing was built to accommodate much of the new population, like in many other development towns.

In 1959, during Wadi Salib riots, the "Union des Nords-africains led by David Ben Haroush, organised a large-scale procession walking towards the nice suburbs of Haifa creating little damage but a great fear within the population. This small incident was taken as an occasion to express the social malaise of the different Oriental communities in Israel and riots spread quickly to other parts of the country; mostly in towns with a high percentage of the population having North African origins like in Tiberias, in Beer-Sheva, in Migdal-Haemek".

Over time, the city came to rely on tourism, becoming a major Galilean center for Christian pilgrims and internal Israeli tourism. The ancient cemetery of Tiberias and its old synagogues are also drawing religious Jewish pilgrims during religious holidays.

Tiberias consists of a small port on the shores of Galilee lake for both fishing and tourist activities. Since the 1990s, the importance of the port for fishing was gradually decreasing, with the decline of the Tiberias lake level, due to continuing droughts and increased pumping of fresh water from the lake. It was expected that the lake of Tiberias will regain its original level (almost 6 metres (20 feet) higher than today), with the full operational capacity of Israeli desalination facilities by 2014. In 2020, the lake raised above the level it was in 1990.

In 2012, plans were announced for a new ultra-Orthodox neighborhood, Kiryat Sanz, on a slope on the western side of the Kinneret.

== Demographics ==
Historical population
Year	Pop.	±%
1972	24,400	—
1983	28,200	+15.6%
1995	35,600	+26.2%
2008	41,600	+16.9%
2022	48,509	+16.6%
2024	52,122	+7.4%

According to the Central Bureau of Statistics (CBS), as of August 2023, 49,876 inhabitants lived in Tiberias. According to CBS, as of December 2019 the city was rated 4 out of 10 on the socio-economic scale. The average monthly salary of an employee for the year 2019 was 7,508 NIS. Among today's population of Jews, many are Mizrahi and Sephardic. The yearly growth rate of its population is 3.9%.

Following Israel's withdrawal from Lebanon in 2000 many ex-South Lebanon Army soldiers and officers who fled from Lebanon settled in Tiberias with their families.

Today almost all of the population is Jewish. In 2022, 93.3% of the population was Jewish and 6.7% was counted as other.

== Urban renewal and preservation ==
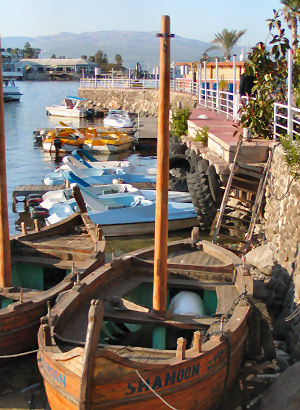
Tiberias harbour

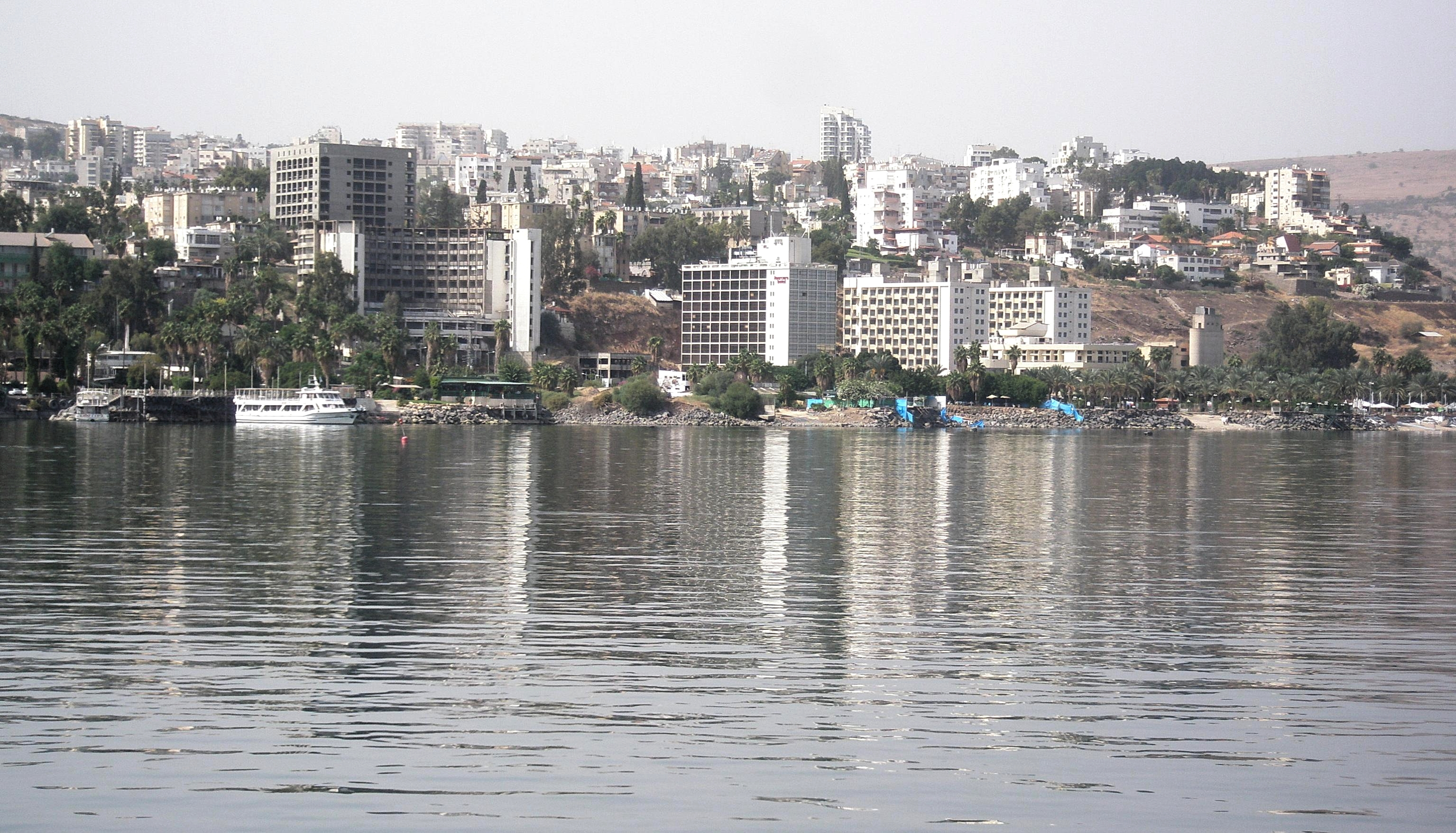
Tiberias beachfront

Ancient and medieval Tiberias was destroyed by a series of devastating earthquakes, and much of what was built after the major earthquake of 1837 was destroyed or badly damaged in the great flood of 1934. Houses in the newer parts of town, uphill from the waterfront, survived. In 1949, 606 houses, comprising almost all of the built-up area of the old quarter other than religious buildings, were demolished over the objections of local Jews who owned about half the houses. Wide-scale development began after the Six-Day War, with the construction of a waterfront promenade, open parkland, shopping streets, restaurants and modern hotels. Carefully preserved were several churches, including one with foundations dating from the Crusader period, the city's two Ottoman-era mosques, and several ancient synagogues. The city's old masonry buildings constructed of local black basalt with white limestone windows and trim have been designated historic landmarks. Also preserved are parts of the ancient wall, the Ottoman-era citadel, historic hotels, Christian pilgrim hostels, convents and schools.

== Archaeology ==
A 2,000 year-old Roman theatre was discovered 15 metres (49 feet) under layers of debris and refuse at the foot of Mount Bernike south of modern Tiberias. It once seated over 7,000 people.

In 2004, excavations in Tiberias conducted by the Israel Antiquities Authority uncovered a structure dating to the 3rd century CE that may have been the seat of the Sanhedrin. At the time it was called Beit Hava'ad.

In June 2018, an underground Jewish mausoleum was discovered. Archaeologists said that the mausoleum was between 1,900 to 2,000 years old as of 2018. The names of the dead were inscribed on the ossuaries in Greek.

In January 2021, the foundations of a mosque dating to the earliest years of Muslim rule was excavated just south of the Sea of Galilee by archaeologists led by Katia Cytryn-Silverman from the Hebrew University of Jerusalem. Built around 670 CE, it is considered to have been the first purpose-built mosque in the city.

== Geography ==
Tiberias lies on a narrow strip of rolling terrain along the western shores of the Sea of Galilee (Lake Tiberias). The hill country directly west of the old city rises steeply as high as 300 meters (980 ft) above lake level. The town's elevation range is of −200 to 200 metres (−660–660 feet).

=== Climate ===
Tiberias has a hot semi-arid climate (Köppen: BSh) that borders a hot-summer Mediterranean climate (Köppen: Csa), with an annual precipitation of 437.1 mm (17.21 in). Summers in Tiberias average a maximum temperature of 38 °C (100 °F) and a minimum temperature of 25 °C (77 °F) in July and August. The winters are mild, with temperatures ranging from 10 to 18 °C (50–64 °F). Extremes have ranged from 0 °C (32 °F) to 48 °C (118 °F).

Climate data for Tiberias, Israel
Month	Jan	Feb	Mar	Apr	May	Jun	Jul	Aug	Sep	Oct	Nov	Dec	Year
Mean daily maximum °C (°F)	18.1 (64.6)	19.3 (66.7)	23.1 (73.6)	27.8 (82.0)	33.2 (91.8)	36.5 (97.7)	38.0 (100.4)	38.0 (100.4)	35.9 (96.6)	31.6 (88.9)	25.7 (78.3)	20.0 (68.0)	28.9 (84.0)
Daily mean °C (°F)	14.3 (57.7)	14.7 (58.5)	17.6 (63.7)	21.5 (70.7)	26.2 (79.2)	29.5 (85.1)	31.5 (88.7)	31.6 (88.9)	29.6 (85.3)	26.2 (79.2)	21.0 (69.8)	16.1 (61.0)	23.3 (74.0)
Mean daily minimum °C (°F)	10.4 (50.7)	10.1 (50.2)	12.0 (53.6)	15.1 (59.2)	19.1 (66.4)	22.5 (72.5)	25.0 (77.0)	25.2 (77.4)	23.3 (73.9)	20.8 (69.4)	16.3 (61.3)	12.1 (53.8)	17.7 (63.9)
Average rainfall mm (inches)	106.9 (4.21)	90.2 (3.55)	55.5 (2.19)	17.6 (0.69)	3.9 (0.15)	0.1 (0.00)	0.0 (0.0)	0.0 (0.0)	0.6 (0.02)	17.4 (0.69)	51.9 (2.04)	93.0 (3.66)	437.1 (17.21)
Average rainy days	11.5	10.2	7.7	3.1	0.9	0.1	0.0	0.0	0.4	3.3	6.1	9.8	53.1
Source: WMO (temperatures 1995–2009, rainfall and rain days 1981–2010)

Tiberias has been severely damaged by earthquakes since antiquity. Earthquakes are known to have occurred in 30, 33, 115, 306, 363, 419, 447, 631–32 (aftershocks continued for a month), 1033, 1182, 1202, 1546, 1759, 1837, 1927 and 1943.

The city is located above the Dead Sea Transform and is one of the cities in Israel that is most at risk to earthquakes (along with Safed, Beit She'an, Kiryat Shmona, and Eilat).

== Health care ==
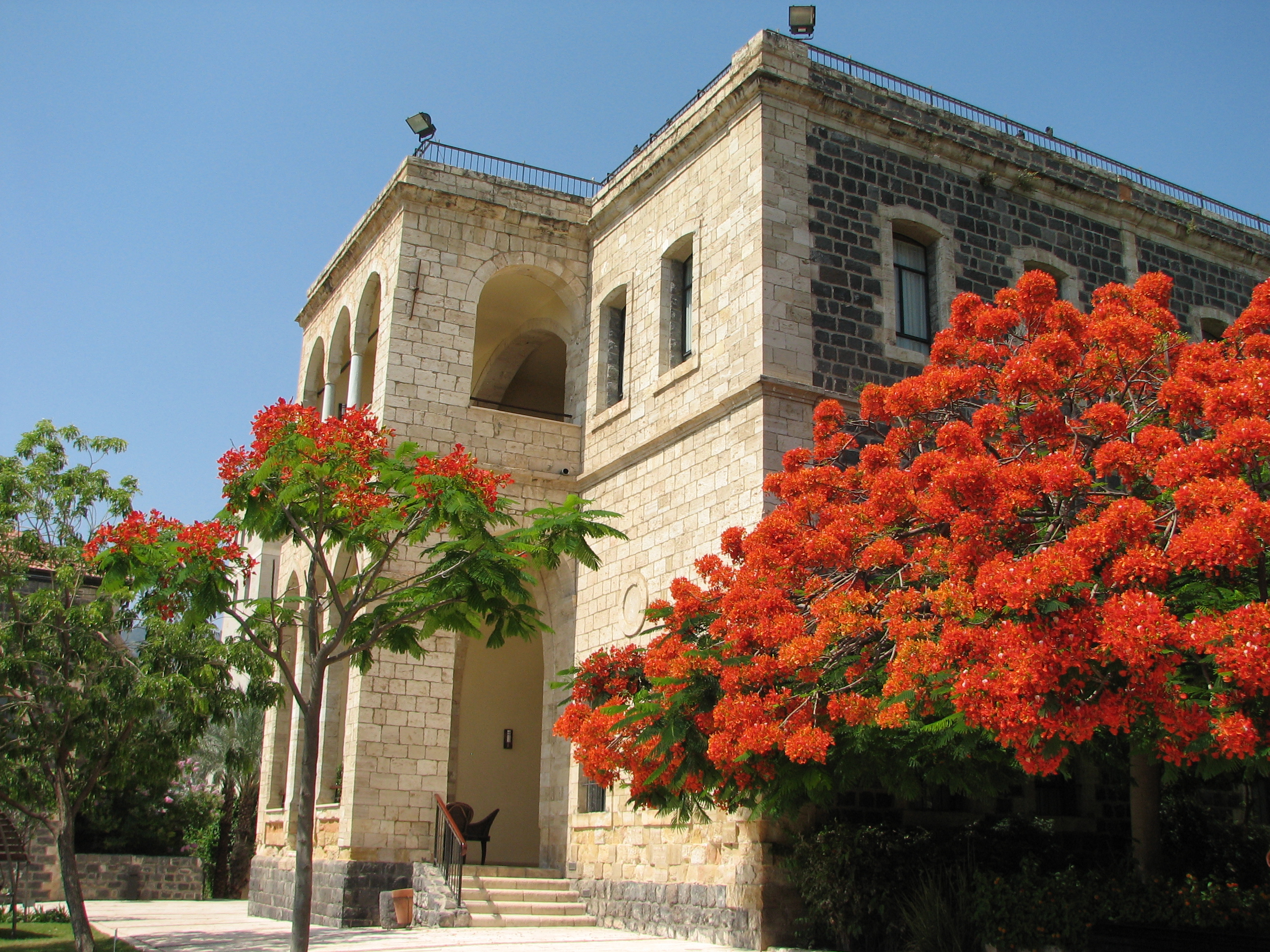
The Scots Hotel in the restored former hospital of Dr Torrance

In 1885, a Scottish doctor and minister, David Watt Torrance, opened a mission hospital in Tiberias that accepted patients of all races and religions. In 1894, it moved to larger premises at Beit abu Shamnel abu Hannah. David Watt Torrance died in Tiberias in 1923. The same year his son, Dr. Herbert Watt Torrance, was appointed head of the hospital. In 1949, following the establishment of the State of Israel, it became a maternity hospital supervised by the Israeli Department of Health. After its closure in 1959, the building became a guesthouse until 1999, when it was renovated and reopened as the Scots Hotel.

Poria hospital is located near Upper Tiberias neighborhood, and operates a hospitalization control center in the city itself.

== Culture ==
=== Art ===
Tiberia due to its pictureque settings and its mix of water and mountain has attracted numerous artists throughout the years. The painter Shimshon Holzman did several water colours of the city which he compiled into an exhibition and set up a studio in Tiberias in 1950. In 2010 a sculpture museum was opened in Tiberias.

=== Sports ===
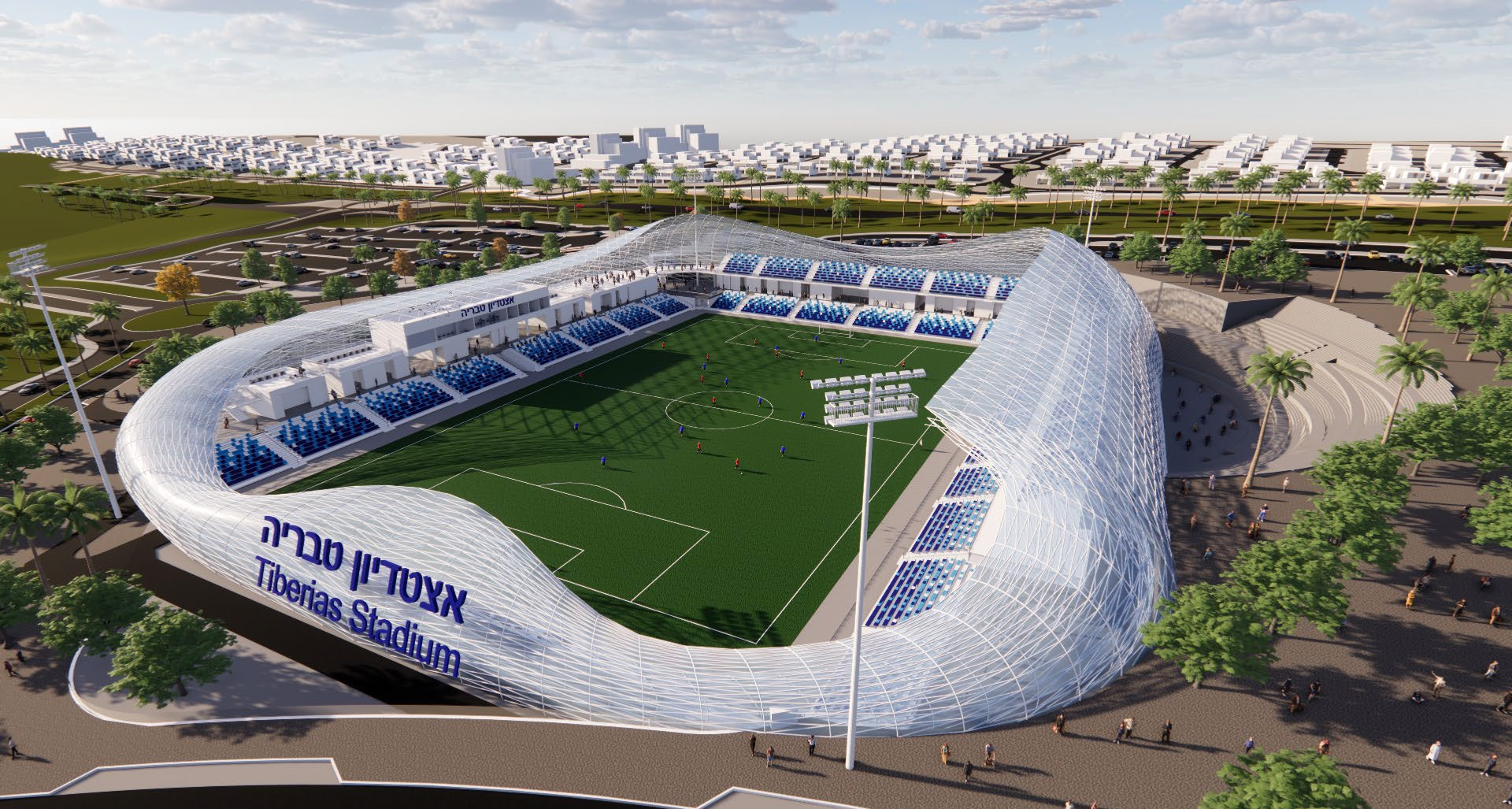
Conceptual art of Tiberias Football Stadium, as designed by Moti Bodek Architects

Its first football club established in 1925 was Maccabi Tiberias, but folded in the 1990s after financial difficulties.

Hapoel Tiberias represented the city in the top division of football for several seasons in the 1960s and 1980s, but eventually dropped into the regional leagues and folded due to financial difficulties.

Following Hapoel's demise, a new club, Ironi Tiberias, was established, which currently plays in Liga Leumit.

6 Nations Championship and Heineken Cup winner Jamie Heaslip was born in Tiberias.

The Tiberias Marathon is an annual road race held along the Sea of Galilee in Israel with a field in recent years of approximately 1000 competitors. The course follows an out-and-back format around the southern tip of the sea and was run concurrently with a 10k race along an abbreviated version of the same route. In 2010, the 10k race was moved to the afternoon before the marathon. At approximately 200 metres (660 feet) below sea level, this is the lowest course in the world.

== Voting Patterns ==
In the 2022 election, 82 percent of voters in Tiberias voted for the parties of the right-wing coalition led by Benjamin Netanyahu, while 16 percent voted for the parties of the center-left coalition led by Yair Lapid and 0.2 percent voted for the Arab parties.

In the 2026 election, 78 percent of voters in Tiberias voted for the parties of the right-wing coalition led by Benjamin Netanyahu, while 17 percent voted for the parties of the center-left coalition led by Gadi Eisenkot and 0.4 percent voted for the Arab parties. An additional 2.2 percent voted for the Reservists, and 1.5 percent voted for Amcha Yisrael. Voter turnout increased 12 percent from the 2022 election.

== Twin towns – sister cities ==
Tiberias is twinned with:

- Great Neck, United States (2002)
- Milwaukee, United States (2000)
- Montecatini Terme, Italy (1979)
- Montpellier, France (1983)
- Saint Paul, Minnesota, United States
- Saint-Raphaël, France (2006)
- Tulsa, United States (1990)
- Worms, Germany (1986)
- Wuxi, China (2006)

== Notable people ==
Prominent people predating the State of Israel, listed by year of birth:

- Rabbi Meir Baal HaNes (Rabbi Meir the miracle maker), 2nd-century CE Jewish sage
- Johanan bar Nappaha (180–279), rabbi
- Sulayman ibn Ahmad at-Tabarani (874–971), Muslim hadith scholar and collector
- Akhiyahu HaKohen (fl. 910 CE), rabbi and Hebrew-language grammarian
- Dosa ben Saadia (935 – 1018) Talmudic scholar, Gaon of Sura
- Donna Gracia Mendes Nasi (1510–1569), Portuguese philanthropist and one of the wealthiest Jewish women of the Renaissance
- Daher al-Umar (c. 1689–1775), virtually autonomous Arab ruler of northern Palestine in the mid-18th century
- Shemariah Catarivas, 18th-century Talmudic writer
- Jacob ha-Cohen Sekili (1846–1918), rabbi
- Hassib Sabbagh (1920–2010), Palestinian billionaire businessman, activist and philanthropist

Prominent people in the State of Israel or born/active there, listed alphabetically:

- Yossi Abulafia (born 1944), writer and graphic artist
- Gadi Eizenkot (born 1960), IDF Chief of General Staff (Feb. 2015 – Jan. 2019)
- Sarai Givaty (born 1982), actress, singer-songwriter, and model
- Menahem Golan (1929–2014), film producer, screenwriter and director
- Jamie Heaslip (born 1983), Irish rugby union player, born in Tiberias
- Elad Levy (born 1972 in Tiberias), neurosurgeon known for his contributions in the management of stroke
- Yair Levy (1952-2026), Haredi rabbi and politician
- Shlomit Nir (born 1952), Olympic swimmer
- Patrick Denis O'Donnell (1922–2005), Commandant of the Irish Defence Forces, military historian, UN peacekeeper stationed in Tiberias in the 1960s
- Yisroel Ber Odesser (born c. 1888 in Tiberias – 1994), Breslover Hasid and rabbi
- Moshe Peretz (born 1983), Mizrahi pop singer-songwriter and composer
- Eldad Ronen (born 1976), Olympic competitive sailor
- Shem-Tov Sabag (born 1959), Olympic marathoner
- Bechor-Shalom Sheetrit (1895–1967), politician, government minister of Israel
- Shmuel Toledano (1921-2022), former Mossad agent and member of the Knesset
- Ya'akov Moshe Toledano (1880–1960), rabbi, Israeli Minister of Religions (1958–1960)

== See also ==
- Bethmaus, ancient Jewish village next to Tiberias
- List of modern names for biblical place names
- Old synagogues of Tiberias
- Tzafon Medical Center, Poriya

== Bibliography ==
- Abbasi, M. (April 2026). "Urban Renewalism, Modernity and the Palestinian City of Tiberias: From the Administration of Dhaher Al-'Umar to the End of the Ottoman Period". Journal of Holy Land and Palestine Studies. 25 (1): 39–59. doi:10.3366/hlps.2026.0370.
- Avi-Yonah, M. (2002). The Holy Land: A Historical Geography from the Persian to the Arab conquest, 536 B.C. to A.D. 640. Carta Jerusalem. ISBN 965-220-502-8.
- Barnai, Jacob (1992). The Jews in Palestine in the Eighteenth Century: Under the Patronage of the Istanbul Committee of Officials for Palestine. Translated by Naomi Goldblum. Tuscaloosa, Alabama: University of Alabama Press. ISBN 978-0-8173-0572-7.
- Barron, J.B., ed. (1923). Palestine: Report and General Abstracts of the Census of 1922. Government of Palestine.
- Cohen, Amnon (1973). Palestine in the 18th Century: Patterns of Government and Administration. Jerusalem: The Magnes Press. ISBN 978-0-19-647903-3.
- Conder, C.R.; Kitchener, H.H. (1881). The Survey of Western Palestine: Memoirs of the Topography, Orography, Hydrography, and Archaeology. Vol. 1. London: Committee of the Palestine Exploration Fund.
- Cytryn-Silverman, Katia (3 January 2016). ""Excavations at Tiberias (Spring and Autumn 2009): Remains of a District Capital," Proceedings of the Seventh International Congress on the Archaeology of the Ancient Near East (April 12th–16th, 2010), vol. 2, Wiesbaden, 2012, pp. 599–617". Academia.edu.
- Cytryn-Silverman, Katia (1 January 2009). "The Umayyad Mosque of Tiberias". Muqarnas. 26 (26): 37–61. doi:10.1163/22118993-90000143.
- Department of Statistics (1945). Village Statistics, April, 1945. Government of Palestine. Archived from the original on 2 April 2019.
- Gil, Moshe (1997) [1983]. A History of Palestine, 634–1099. Translated by Ethel Broido. Cambridge: Cambridge University Press. ISBN 0-521-59984-9.
- Guérin, V. (1880). Description Géographique Historique et Archéologique de la Palestine (in French). Vol. 3: Galilee, pt. 1. Paris: L'Imprimerie Nationale.
- Hadawi, S. (1970). Village Statistics of 1945: A Classification of Land and Area ownership in Palestine. Palestine Liberation Organization Research Center. Archived from the original on 8 December 2018.
- Hirschfeld, Yizhar (1987). "The History and Town-Plan of Ancient Ḥammat Gādẹ̄r". Zeitschrift des Deutschen Palästina-Vereins. 103: 101–116. JSTOR 27931308.
- Hirschfeld, Yizhar (2007). "Post-Roman Tiberias: between East and West". In Henning, Joachim (ed.). Post-Roman Towns, Trade and Settlement in Europe and Byzantium, Volume 5/2. Berlin and New York: Walter de Gruyter. pp. 193–206. ISBN 978-3-11-018358-0.
- Hütteroth, W.-D.; Abdulfattah, K. (1977). Historical Geography of Palestine, Transjordan and Southern Syria in the Late 16th Century. Erlanger Geographische Arbeiten, Sonderband 5. Erlangen, Germany: Vorstand der Fränkischen Geographischen Gesellschaft. ISBN 3-920405-41-2. Archived from the original on 14 October 2019.
- Joudah, Ahmad Hasan (2013). Revolt in Palestine in the Eighteenth Century: The Era of Shaykh Zahir al-Umar (Second ed.). Piscataway, New Jersey: Gorgias Press. ISBN 978-1-4632-0002-2.
- Le Strange, G. (1890). Palestine Under the Moslems: A Description of Syria and the Holy Land from A.D. 650 to 1500. Committee of the Palestine Exploration Fund.
- Lynch, W.F. (1850). Narrative of the United States' Expedition to the River Jordan and the Dead Sea. Philadelphia: Lea and Blanchard.
- Mills, E., ed. (1932). Census of Palestine 1931. Population of Villages, Towns and Administrative Areas. Jerusalem: Government of Palestine.
- Lewis, B. "Studies in the Ottoman Archives—I". Bulletin of the School of Oriental and African Studies. 16: 469–501.
- Mariti, G. (1792). Travels Through Cyprus, Syria, and Palestine; with a General History of the Levant. Vol. 1. Dublin: P. Byrne.
- Morris, B. (2004). The Birth of the Palestinian Refugee Problem Revisited. Cambridge University Press. ISBN 978-0-521-00967-6. Archived from the original on 25 July 2020.
- Palmer, E.H. (1881). The Survey of Western Palestine: Arabic and English Name Lists Collected During the Survey by Lieutenants Conder and Kitchener, R. E. Transliterated and Explained by E.H. Palmer. Committee of the Palestine Exploration Fund.
- Petersen, Andrew (2001). A Gazetteer of Buildings in Muslim Palestine (British Academy Monographs in Archaeology). Vol. 1. Oxford University Press. pp. 299–306. ISBN 978-0-19-727011-0. Archived from the original on 28 May 2021.
- Philipp, T. (2001). Acre: The Rise and Fall of a Palestinian City, 1730–1831. Columbia University Press. ISBN 978-0-231-50603-8.
- Pococke, R. (1745). A description of the East, and some other countries. Vol. 2. London: Printed for the author, by W. Bowyer.
- Pringle, D. (1997). Secular buildings in the Crusader Kingdom of Jerusalem: an archaeological Gazetter. Cambridge: Cambridge University Press. p. 101. ISBN 0521-46010-7.
- Pringle, D. (1998). The Churches of the Crusader Kingdom of Jerusalem: L-Z (excluding Tyre). Vol. II. Cambridge University Press. p. 351-366. ISBN 0-521-39037-0.
- Rafeq, A.-K. (1966). The Province of Damascus, 1723–1783. Beirut: Khayats.
- Razi, Zvi; Braun, Eliot (1992). "The Lost Crusader Castle of Tiberias". In Kedar, B. Z. (ed.). The Horns of Hattin. London: Variorum. pp. 216–229. ISBN 0-86078-334-0.
- Rhode, H. (1979). The Administration and Population of the Sancak of Safad in the Sixteenth Century (PhD). Columbia University.
- Robinson, E.; Smith, E. (1841). Biblical Researches in Palestine, Mount Sinai and Arabia Petraea: A Journal of Travels in the year 1838. Vol. 3. Boston: Crocker & Brewster.
- Schumacher, G. (1888). "Population list of the Liwa of Akka". Quarterly Statement - Palestine Exploration Fund. 20: 169–191.
- Thomson, W.M. (1859). The Land and the Book: Or, Biblical Illustrations Drawn from the Manners and Customs, the Scenes and Scenery, of the Holy Land. Vol. 1 (1 ed.). New York: Harper & Brothers.
- Thomson, W.M. (1859). The Land and the Book: Or, Biblical Illustrations Drawn from the Manners and Customs, the Scenes and Scenery, of the Holy Land. Vol. 2 (1 ed.). New York: Harper & Brothers.
- Walmsley, Alan G. (1987). The Administrative Structure and Urban Geography of the Jund of Filasṭīn and the Jund of al-Urdunn: The Cities and Districts of Palestine and East Jordan during the Early Islamic, ʿAbbāsid and Early Fāṭimid Periods (PhD). University of Sydney.
- Yaari, Abraham (1946). מסעות ארץ ישראל: של עולים יהודים מימי הביניים ועד ראשית ימי שיבת ציון: קיבוצם וביאורם - "Eretz Yisrael Journeys: of Jewish Pilgrims From The Middle Ages and Until the Beginning of the Return to Zion: Collection and Explanation" (in Hebrew). Tel Aviv: Gazit. Archived from the original on 11 March 2020. copied and uploaded at "hebrewbooks.org"
- Yazbak, M. (2013). "The Politics of Trade and Power: Dahir al-Umar and the Making of Early Modern Palestine". Journal of the Economic and Social History of the Orient. 56 (4–5): 696–736. doi:10.1163/15685209-12341338. S2CID 154242949.
