= Jacob ha-Cohen Sekili =

Jacob ha-Cohen Sekili (Hebrew: יעקב הכהן סקילי) (1846 in Tiberias – 1918) was a 19th-century Sephardi rabbi in Tiberias, Ottoman Palestine. While being of Moroccan descent, his surname "Sekili" indicates that his family had originated in Sicily.

Sekili served as a dayan (religious judge) in Tiberias and was greatly respected. He was a scholar of note and nurtured many disciples. He was a prolific writer and authored several works including Yalkut Talmud Torah, Torat ha-Mincha, Gulat ha-Koteret, Yayin ha-Meshumar and Sefer ha-Yichut. He was also instrumental in the erection of a synagogue and lodgings for pilgrims at the tomb of the 2nd-century sage Rabbi Meir on the outskirts of Tiberias.
