= Shemariah Catarivas =

Shemariah Catarivas was a Talmudic writer of the 18th century. He was originally from Tiberias, and went to Tunis in 1750 as alms-collector, settling there after a sojourn in Algiers. He gained a reputation for scholarship and piety. Catarivas was an intimate friend of Abraham Cohen Baberrebi, one of the oldest rabbis of Tunis, whose grandson published Catarivas's Zeker Tzaddiq (Memory of the Just), a commentary on the first two orders of the Mishnah, together with the Abraham Yagel of Abraham Cohen (Leghorn, 1843). Several of the responsa of Catarivas are contained in the Yerek Ya'aqob of Jacob ben Abraham Faitusi, Leghorn, 1842.

== Bibliography ==
- David Cazès, Notes Bibliographiques sur la Littérature Juive Tunisienne, etc., pp. 90 et seq., 193, Paris, 1889
