= Daher al-Umar =

Arab ruler of northern Palestine (1689/90–1775)

- ظاهر العمر
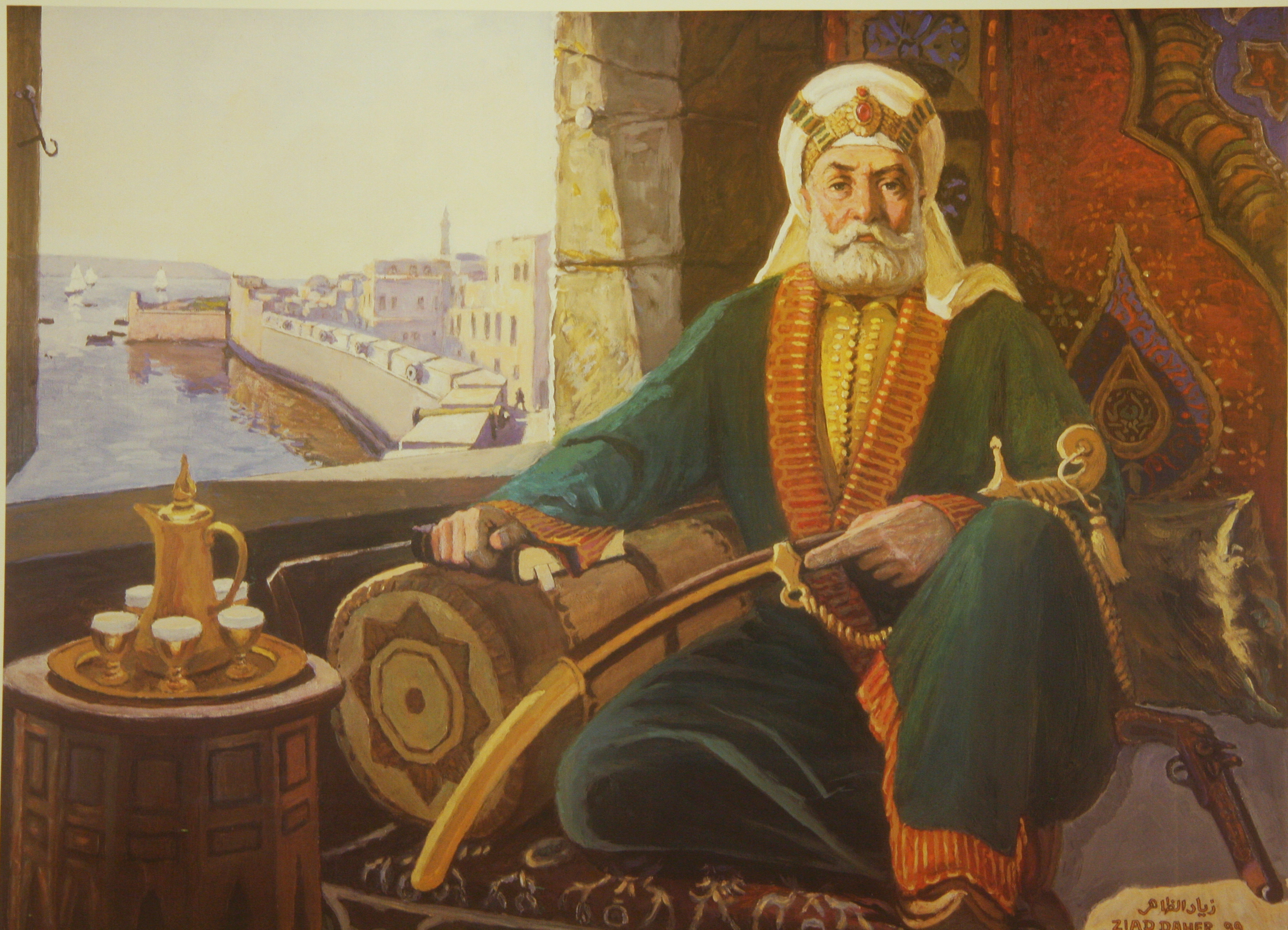
- Modern, artistic representation of Daher (Note: The artist, Ziad Daher, was a Palestinian-Israeli researcher, specializing in the history of Nazareth. His painting of Daher is used as the front cover of Mahmoud Yazbak's 2017 study, Al-Shaykh Zahir al-Umar al-Zaydani: al-asr al-dhahab li Filastin fi al-asr al-hadith [Sheikh Zahir al-Umar al-Zaydani: The Golden Age of Palestine in the Modern Era] and Ibrahim Nasrallah's 2014 novel about Daher, The Lanterns of the King of Galilee: A Novel of 18th-Century Palestine.)

Sheikh of Acre and All Galilee Emir of Nazareth, Tiberias and Safed (1768) (Note: In the 1730s he was formally referred to as the 'sheikh of Tiberias' and after his power extended into Safed in the 1740s, he was often officially referred to as the 'sheikh of Safed'. Daher had been signing his correspondences as the zabit (officer) "in charge of Acre and the whole Galilee" from the early 1750s, a reflection of his official title during that time as the 'multazim [tax farmer] of the muqata'a [fiscal district] of Safad and the controller of the customs of Acre'. Ottoman firmans most often refer to him thereafter until his death in October 1775 simply as the 'multazim of Acre'.)

Personal details
- Born: 1689 or 1690 Galilee, Sidon Eyalet, Ottoman Empire
- Died: 21 or 22 August 1775 Acre, Sidon Eyalet, Ottoman Empire
- Relations: Zayadina (family); Sa'd al-Umar (brother)
- Children: Salibi; Ali; Uthman; Sa'id; Ahmad; Salih; Sa'd al-Din; Abbas; Nijma (daughter)
- Parent: Umar al-Zaydani

Daher al-Umar al-Zaydani, alternatively spelled Zahir al-Umar or Dahir al-Umar (Arabic: ظاهر العمر الزيداني, romanized: Ẓāhir al-ʿUmar al-Zaydānī, (Note: The proper transliteration of his given name is Ẓāhir, but in the colloquial Arabic of the Galilee, his name is pronounced Ḍāhir.) 1689/90 – 21 or 22 August 1775), was the paramount sheikh of the Zayadina family and ruler of northern Palestine from the 1730s until his death in 1775, during Ottoman rule. At his zenith in 1774, he controlled the Syrian coast from Jaffa to Sidon, though formal recognition of his status was limited to that of a multazim (tax farmer).

In 1730, Daher took over Tiberias and by c. 1740, Safed and Nazareth. He and his family fortified these towns and other Galilee villages, most notably Deir Hanna, helping them withstand sieges by the governor of Damascus, Sulayman Pasha al-Azm, in 1742–1743. By then, Daher controlled the area's cotton and eventually monopolized its lucrative trade with the French. In 1750, he made the outlet of this trade, the port of Acre, into his capital, developing it into Syria's third largest city. He expanded into Haifa and its environs in the 1760s.

His territorial expansion provoked a war with the governor of Damascus, Uthman Pasha al-Kurji, against whom Daher allied with Egypt's mamluk ruler, Ali Bey, and the Shias of southern Lebanon. Their military campaigns ousted Uthman Pasha and his son from Damascus and Sidon, culminating with Daher's victory at Lake Hula and occupations of Jaffa and Sidon in 1771. By 1774, the Ottoman army chief in Syria recognized his control of Sidon province and most of Palestine, but this was soon rescinded by the new sultan. In March 1775, Abu al-Dhahab, who had earlier toppled Ali Bey, ousted Daher from Acre, but died soon after and Daher returned to power. In August, the Ottomans, freed up from their six-year war with Russia, blockaded Acre and eliminated Daher. The last of the Zayadina were neutralized in 1776 by Acre's new governor, Ahmad Pasha al-Jazzar.

Daher's establishment of law and order, flexible taxation policies, and battlefield reputation earned him the goodwill of the local peasantry. He invited Christian and Jewish immigrants from across the empire, stimulating the economy and leading to the significant growth of the Christian communities in Acre and Nazareth and the Jewish community in Tiberias. Under his rule, northern Palestine's main centers, Acre, Haifa, Tiberias, and Nazareth, urbanized and prospered after long periods of decline. With Acre's restoration and the reestablishment of Haifa, Daher strengthened the Galilee's ties with the Mediterranean world, which continued under Jazzar. Daher's autonomy over much of Palestine has made him a national hero among Palestinians today.

== Family and early life ==
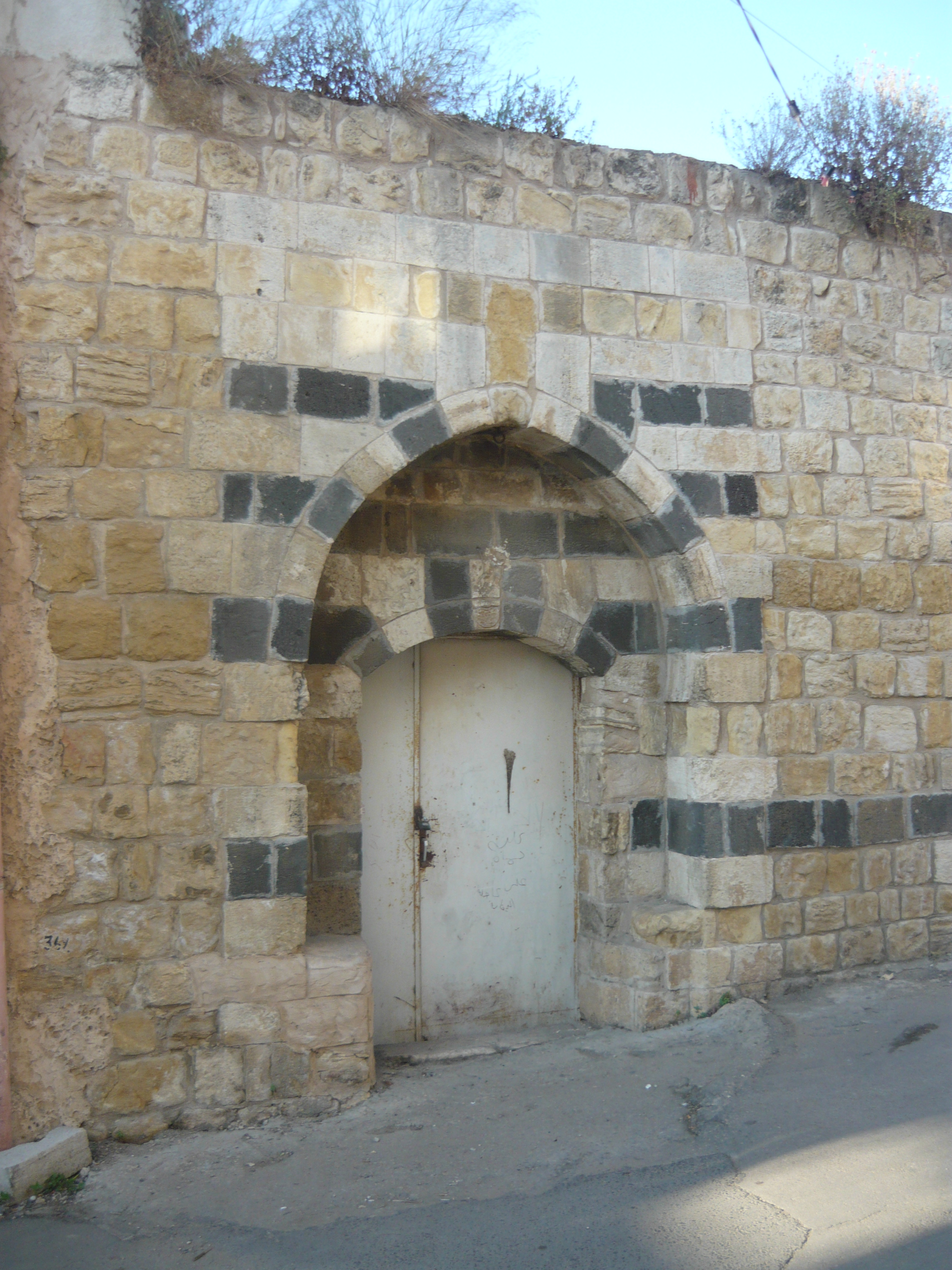
Daher's purported home in Arraba

Daher was born in 1689 or 1690. (Note: Daher's date of birth is not definitively known, with the years 1686, 1689/1690 and 1694 cited by Daher's contemporary biographers Volney, Mikha'il Sabbagh and Khalil al-Muradi, respectively. A modern biographer of Daher, Ahmad Hasan Joudah, considers Sabbagh to be the most reliable source for Daher's personal life and thus deems 1689/1690 to be the most likely year of Daher's birth.) His father, Umar, was the sheikh of the Zayadina (sing. Zaydani), a family of Bedouin origin. They had settled around Tiberias in the eastern Galilee in the late 17th century under Daher's grandfather, Salih. (Note: The name of Daher's grandfather, who was not mentioned directly in the contemporary sources, was confirmed in a mosque inscription found in the Galilee village of Damun dated to 1722 or 1723, which credited Daher's uncle, 'Ali ibn Salih', as its builder.) Daher's mother was from the Sardiyya, a Bedouin tribe in the Hauran. The Galilee was administratively part of Sidon Eyalet, a province of the Constantinople-based Ottoman Empire. (Note: Sidon Eyalet was a province spanning the Galilee, southern Mount Lebanon, and the adjacent Mediterranean coast. By the early 18th century, the eyalet was divided into several nahiyes (subdistricts), most often referred to specifically as muqata'as (fiscal districts). Tax collection in the muqata'as was farmed out by the governor to multazims (holders of iltizam), who were also responsible for protecting their territory from Bedouin depredations, building and maintaining fortifications and other public works, and overseeing commercial and agricultural affairs.) Due to their endemic military weakness, the governors of Sidon subcontracted tax collection to local potentates, like the Zaydani sheikhs, as iltizam (limited-term tax farms). Around 1698, Daher's father became a multazim (iltizam holder) and by 1703 was considered the "paramount sheikh of the Galilee" by the French vice-consul of Sidon.

Umar died in 1706 and was succeeded by Daher's eldest brother, Sa'd. The Zaydani sheikhs were often in conflict with the governor for failing to timely forward the revenues of their iltizam. Occasionally, they leased their iltizam in young Daher's name to mitigate their liability in the event of a default. This afforded Daher considerable power within his clan. In 1707, Daher was entangled in a brawl, killing a man from Tiberias. To avoid potential repercussions, Sa'd moved the family to Arraba, a village between the commercial centers of Tiberias, Safed and Nazareth but away from the main highways. The Zayadina had been offered safe haven there by the sheikhs of the Bedouin Saqr tribe. In Arraba, Daher was educated by the Muslim scholar Abd al-Qadir al-Hifnawi and learned how to hunt and fight. Daher's martial talents and moderate personality gained him the respect of the peasantry. In the mid-1710s, he attained folk hero status for defending the village of Bi'ina from an attack by the governor of Sidon and evading capture. Throughout the 1720s, Daher and Sa'd frequently traded goods in Damascus, continuing commercial relationships their father had established there.

Among the elite contacts Daher made in Damascus was Sayyid Muhammad al-Husayni, a sharif (descendant of the Islamic prophet Muhammad). Daher married Sayyid Muhammad's daughter as his first wife, and established her residence in Nazareth because she considered Arraba too small. When her father died, Daher inherited his fortune. Daher had four other wives, among them a woman from his mother's Sardiyya tribe, and the daughters of the mukhtars (village headmen) of Bi'ina and Deir al-Qassi. His marriages were politically advantageous, consolidating relationships with Bedouin tribes, local clans, or urban notables. From his marriages, Daher had eight sons and a daughter. His sons were Salibi, Uthman, full brothers Ali and Sa'id, Ahmad, Salih, Sa'd al-Din and Abbas. His daughter Nijma was married to his cousin Karim al-Ayyubi, the grandson of Daher's uncle Ali. By 1773, Daher had 272 children, grandchildren and great-grandchildren. (Note: The number of Daher's descendants was reported by his contemporary, Sauveur Kosmopolites Lusignan, a Greek aide, friend and biographer of Ali Bey, the mamluk ruler of Egypt, who was a close ally of Daher from the 1760s until his death in 1773.)

Genealogical tree of the Zayadina

Zaydan
Salih
Ali (fl. 1704 – c. 1723)	Umar (d. 1706)	Hamza (fl. 1708)
Muhammad (d. 1743)	Ayyub	Shammah	Sa'd (d. 1761)	Yusuf (fl. 1761)	Salih (d. 1738)	Daher (d. 1775)
Karim (d. 1775)	Nijma	Salibi (d. 1773)	Uthman	Ali (d. 1776)	Sa'id	Ahmad	Abbas (d. 1810)	Sa'd al-Din	Salih (fl. 1775 – c. 1799
Nasir	Abd al-Aziz	Kanj	Jahjah	Fadil Husayn (d. 1810)	Kamil Hasan	Muhammad	Yusuf	As'ad	Husayn (fl. 1850)
Abbas	Ali (fl. 1898–1892)	Kanj (d. 1930)	Daher	Salih	Ahmad

== Rise and consolidation of power ==
=== Stronghold in the Galilee ===
==== Capture of Tiberias ====
Around 1730, the governor of Sidon and the sheikhs of Jabal Nablus (e.g. Samaria) moved to suppress the Saqr Bedouins. The tribe had long dominated the area between Nablus and Safed, rendering the highways unsafe, plundering villages, and ignoring tax obligations. Under pressure, the leader of the Saqr appointed Daher to intercede for them with the governor, hoping to benefit from the Zayadina's good reputation. The historian Thomas Philipp comments the Bedouins "probably hoped to use Ẓāhir for their own purposes" but "did not anticipate how quickly Ẓāhir al-ʿUmar would use them for his own ambitions". Not long after allying with the Saqr, Daher took over Tiberias with their support. He ousted the town's mutasallim (subgovernor) and obtained the iltizam of Tiberias and Arraba. Tiberias thereafter became Daher's base.

==== Northern and western expansion ====
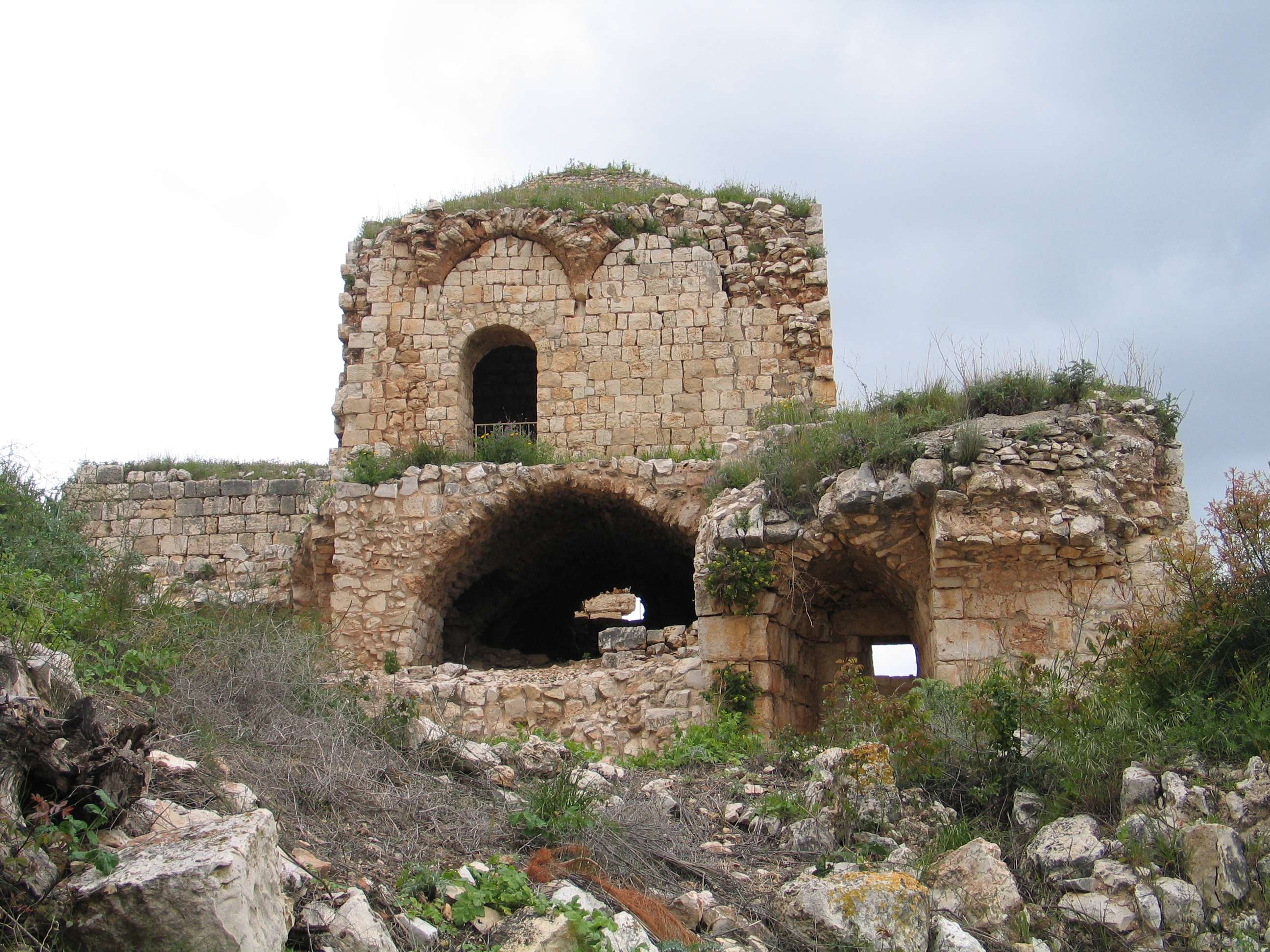
Ruins of the fortress of Jiddin, in the northwestern Galilee

Due to Daher's relative justice and fairness, peasants from nearby areas moved to his domains or invited his rule. The people living under Ahmad al-Husayn, the multazim of Acre's coastal plain, appealed for Daher to relieve them of his heavy-handedness and the extortions of the Bedouin. Daher obtained permission from Sidon's governor, Ibrahim Pasha al-Azm, to seize the area. Ahmad also requested permission to attack Daher, to which Ibrahim Pasha consented in the hope of neutralizing two powerful local leaders. In 1738, Daher led a 1,500-strong force which defeated Ahmad and gained control over his fortress, Jiddin, and its dependencies, Abu Sinan and Tarshiha. During the confrontation, Daher encountered a mercenary, Ahmad Agha al-Dinkizli, whom he commissioned to raise and command a private army of Maghrebi troops.

Daher next moved on Safed, whose multazim, Muhammad al-Nafi, surrendered it around 1740. Control of the strategically situated town, with its citadel on a high hill, gave the Zayadina command over the surrounding countryside. Afterward, Bi'ina, which had withstood a siege by Daher in 1739, was added to his domains through an agreement sealed by his marriage to its mukhtar's daughter. He also acquired the fortress of Suhmata through diplomacy, followed by the nearby fortified village of Deir al-Qassi, after marrying the daughter of its sheikh, Abd al-Khaliq Salih. These gains solidified Daher's hold over the northern and eastern Galilee. Sa'd established his fortified headquarters in Deir Hanna, while their cousin Muhammad al-Ali, who was based in Damun, added Shefa-Amr to his holdings, boosting the Zaydani presence in the western Galilee. (Note: Muhammad's father Ali, based in Damun, had held the iltizam of nearby Shefa-Amr, I'billin and Tamra and engaged in trade with European cotton merchants in Acre as early as 1704. Muhammad eventually succeeded his father.)

==== Capture of Nazareth and conflict with Nablus ====
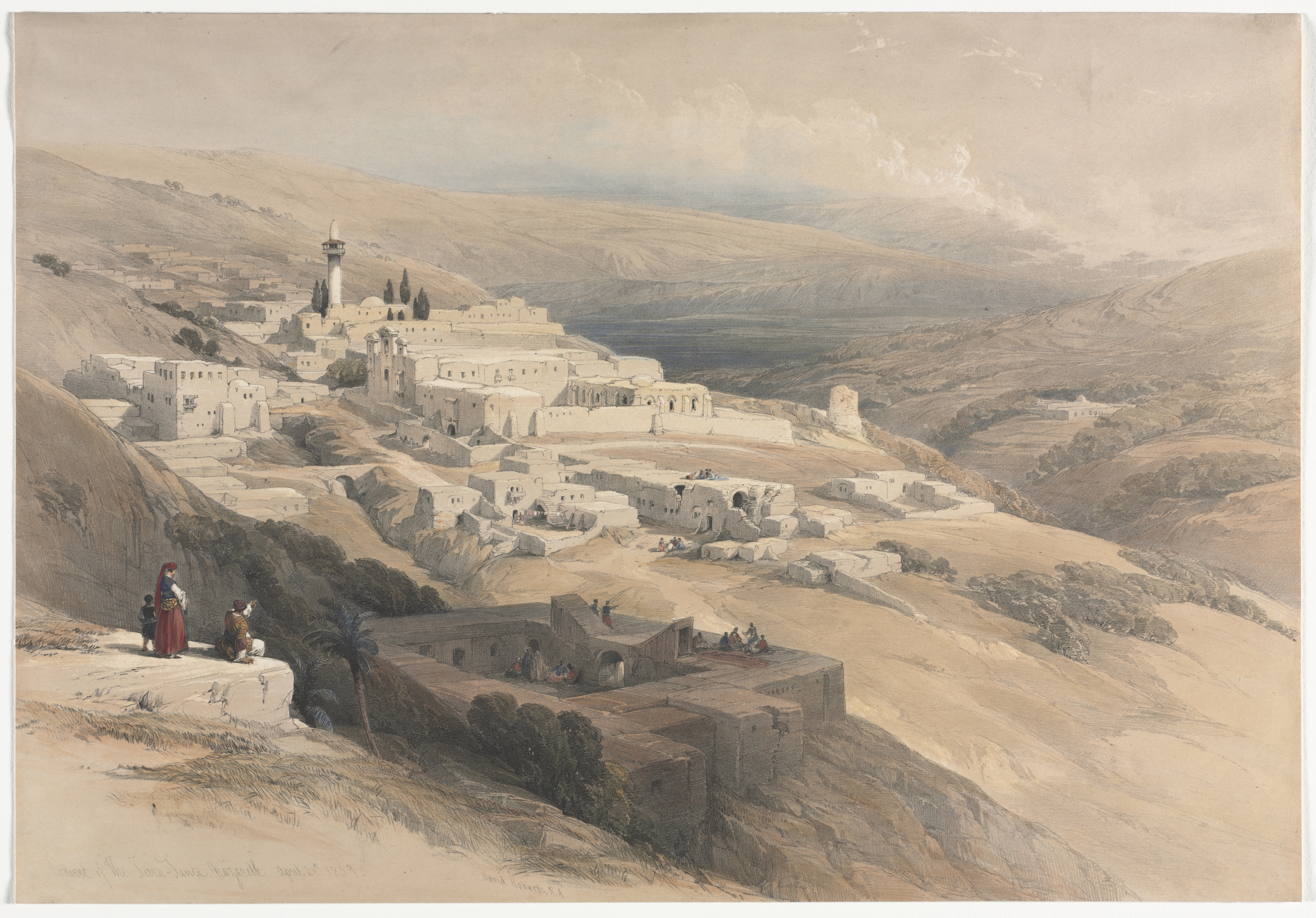
Drawing of Nazareth, 1839

Nazareth and the Marj Ibn Amer plain, through which the Damascus–Nablus trade routes passed, came under Daher's control by the end of 1740. Although it administratively belonged to Sidon, Nazareth was controlled by the rural chiefs of Nablus Sanjak, a district of the Damascus Eyalet. The town was the residence of Daher's first, Damascene wife and the hometown of his second wife. Through these connections, he forged close ties with its mostly Christian residents. They preferred Daher, who had a reputation for religious tolerance, over the chiefs and merchants of Nablus, who they viewed as oppressive or extortionary.

The dominant clans of Jabal Nablus, especially the Jarrars, challenged Daher's advance, recruiting the Saqr as allies. By then, the Saqr had grown hostile toward Daher for stemming their raids against the peasants in his territories. Probably sometime after 1738, Daher, leading his kinsmen, Maghrebi mercenaries, and the Nazarenes, routed the Jarrar–Saqr coalition in Marj Ibn Amer, near the village of al-Mansi. (Note: The Nablus-based chronicler, Ihsan al-Nimr, in his detailed account of Nablus during the 18th century, does not mention the battle. The Nazarene historian Hanna Samarah claims Daher's 2,000 men killed 8,000 on the opposing side. The head of the Jarrars, Sheikh Ibrahim al-Jarrar, was slain.) Afterward, Daher mobilized his people to subdue Jabal Nablus. Among them were many Nazarenes, including Christian women who supplied the troops with food and water. Daher's forces pursued the Jarrars to their throne village of Sanur, but retreated after failing to capture its fortress. The defeat marked the limit of Daher's influence south of Marj Ibn Amer and confirmed the Jarrars as the dominant force of Jabal Nablus.

=== Confrontations and respite with Damascus ===
Daher's rise coincided with that of the Azm family, whose members governed Damascus since 1725. Sulayman Pasha al-Azm (r. 1734–1738, 1741–1743) opposed Daher's buildup of power on the borders of his province and encroachments into Nablus Sanjak. More alarming to Sulayman Pasha than Daher's activities in Palestine were his incursions east of the Jordan River. In 1737 and 1738, Daher launched raids into the Jawlan (Golan) and Hauran, and attacked Damascus city. The imperial government determined Daher was a threat to the all-important Hajj pilgrim caravan to Mecca, which was annually marshaled in Damascus and traditionally led by its governor. With Constantinople's sanction, Sulayman Pasha launched an abortive attack against Daher in 1738. The Saqr then captured his brother, Salih, and handed him to Sulayman Pasha, who executed him, embittering Daher. Sulayman Pasha renewed his efforts to suppress the Zayadina in 1741, enlisting his nephew, Ibrahim Pasha of Sidon, who was defeated by Daher near Acre.

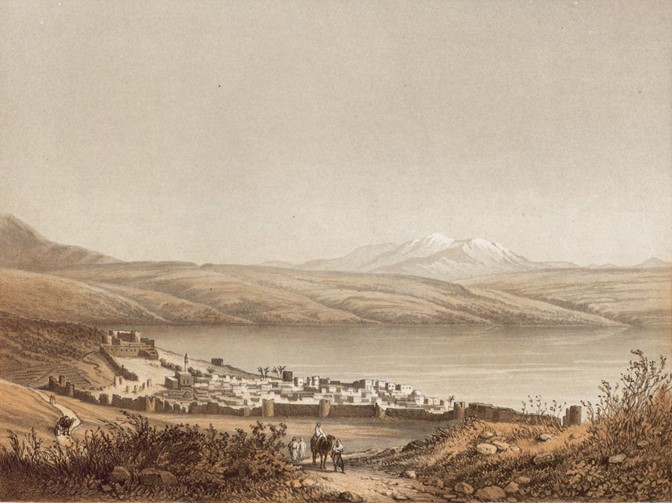
Drawing of Tiberias and its walls, 1857

With unprecedented imperial orders to execute Daher, (Note: Previous imperial orders to Damascus had only called for "punishing" Daher.) Sulayman Pasha besieged Tiberias in September 1742. He withdrew in January 1743 to lead the Hajj but resumed the operation upon his return to Damascus in July 1743. The campaign ended in August with Sulayman Pasha's death on the outskirts of Tiberias and Daher's subsequent assault on his camp. The following fourteen years were characterized by peace between Daher and Sulayman Pasha's successor, his nephew As'ad Pasha al-Azm (r. 1743–1757), who was deterred by his uncle's unsuccessful experience and preoccupied with domestic affairs. (Note: Ibn al-Falaqinsi, the defterdar (treasurer) of Damascus under As'ad Pasha al-Azm, formally made peace with Daher in the governor's name in 1743. Daher then sent As'ad Pasha and Ibn al-Falaqinsi expensive gifts.)

In 1757, Husayn Pasha ibn Makki replaced As'ad Pasha and among his priorities were subduing Daher. In late 1757, the Banu Sakhr and Sardiyya tribes launched an assault on the Hajj caravan on its return to Syria. Thousands of Muslim pilgrims were killed, including Sultan Osman III's sister. The attack shocked the government, and discredited Husayn Pasha for failing to ward off the Bedouin. He lodged a complaint to the imperial government alleging Daher's involvement in the raid. (Note: While Daher and the Zayadina were not involved in the Hajj caravan raid, he had friendly ties with the Sardiyya, the tribe of his mother and one of his wives, and he allowed the Bedouins to sell goods looted from the caravan in his domains following the attack.) Daher denied this and pressed for an investigation into the assault. To earn the government's favor, he purchased the looted goods of the caravan from the Bedouin, including the decorated banners representing the prophet Muhammad and the sovereignty of the sultan, and restored them to the new sultan, Osman III's successor, Mustafa III.

=== Control of Acre and Haifa ===
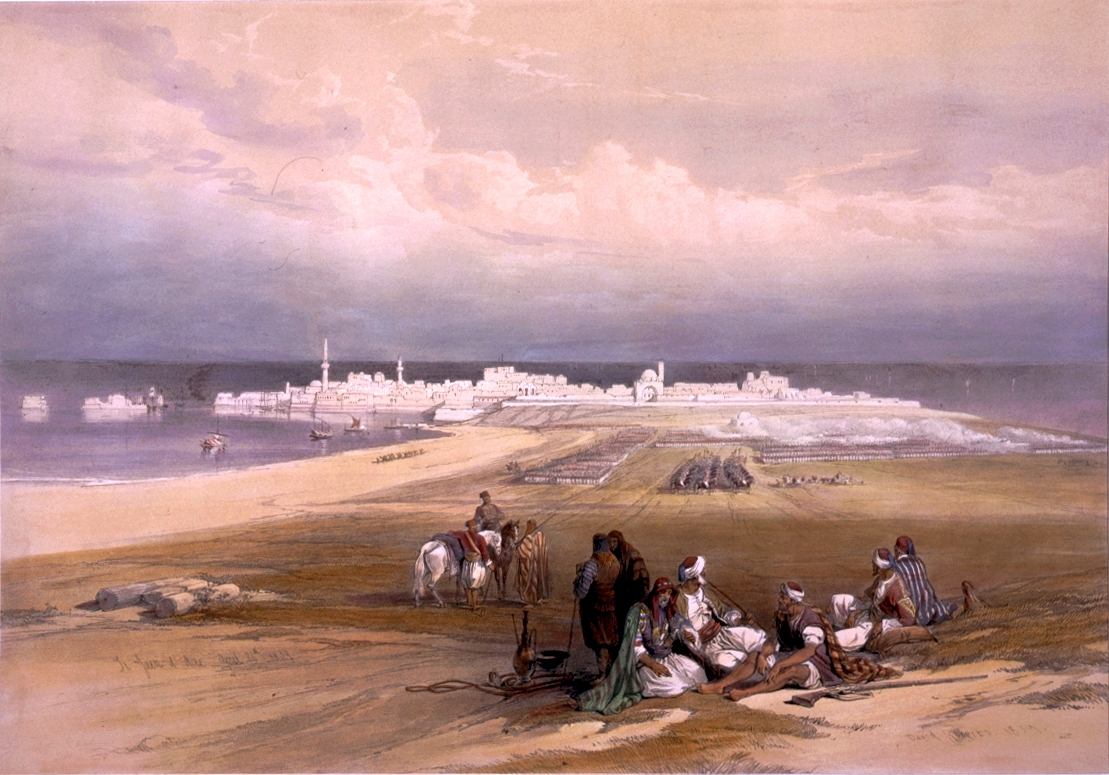
Drawing of Acre, 1839

The peace with Damascus enabled Daher to focus his resources on capturing the port of Acre. As he already controlled the agricultural output of Acre's countryside, the port would provide him a key outlet to the sea and greatly improve his profits. In 1743, Daher executed his cousin Muhammad to remove him as a rival for influence in Acre. That year, Ibrahim Pasha, wary of Daher's growing power, rejected his request for Acre's iltizam. In 1744, Daher took Acre by force and killed its multazim. After mobilizing the town's ulema (Muslim scholars) and qadi (judge) to petition the sultan, in July 1746, Daher was formally appointed the multazim of Acre. Upon completing its walls and other public works c. 1750, Daher made Acre his new headquarters. He thereafter seized and developed the villages of Julis, Mazra'a, Makr, Judayda, and Sumayriyya as personal estates and installed water mills on the Na'aman and Ga'aton rivers near the city, both part of the 16th-century waqf (endowment) of Sinan Pasha.

In 1757, Daher expanded his holdings southward, along Palestine's northern coastal plain, taking control of Haifa, Tira, and Tantura, and the adjoining Mount Carmel. Ostensibly, Daher captured the harbor village of Haifa to eliminate the base established there by Maltese pirates. More likely, he aimed to prevent the governors of Damascus from utilizing Haifa, strategically positioned across the bay from Acre, as a launchpad against him, while seeking a secondary port. As'ad Pasha had not acted against Daher's occupation of Haifa, but a new governor, Uthman Pasha al-Kurji (r. 1760–1771), attempted to return it to Damascene authority. (Note: The nahiye of Haifa and Yajur, which spanned the coastland between Tantura and Haifa and the adjacent Mount Carmel, became part of the tax base of Acre, and by extension, the Sidon Eyalet in early 1723, after having been administratively part of the Lajjun Sanjak of the Damascus Eyalet since the advent of Ottoman rule in 1517. An imperial order giving legal cover to Uthman Pasha's temporary capture of Tantura, restored Haifa and Yajur to Damascene jurisdiction from 1760 until the order was revoked in 1762, following Daher's recapture of Tantura.) Acting on Uthman Pasha's request, the governor of Sidon dispatched a vessel of mercenaries captained by a Frenchman to capture Haifa in May 1761. Upon arrival, Daher had the ship confiscated, its soldiers arrested, and the captain fined. The issue over Haifa's annexation was settled in Daher's favor by his imperial associate, Yaqub Agha. (Note: Yaqub Agha, a Constantinople-based official, was hosted by Daher in Acre during his visit to Jerusalem, and forged a lifelong friendship with him.) The latter had a high-ranking official, the kizlar agha (chief eunuch) Sulayman Agha, revoke the imperial order sanctioning Uthman Pasha's attempt to repossess Haifa.

=== Family rebellions ===
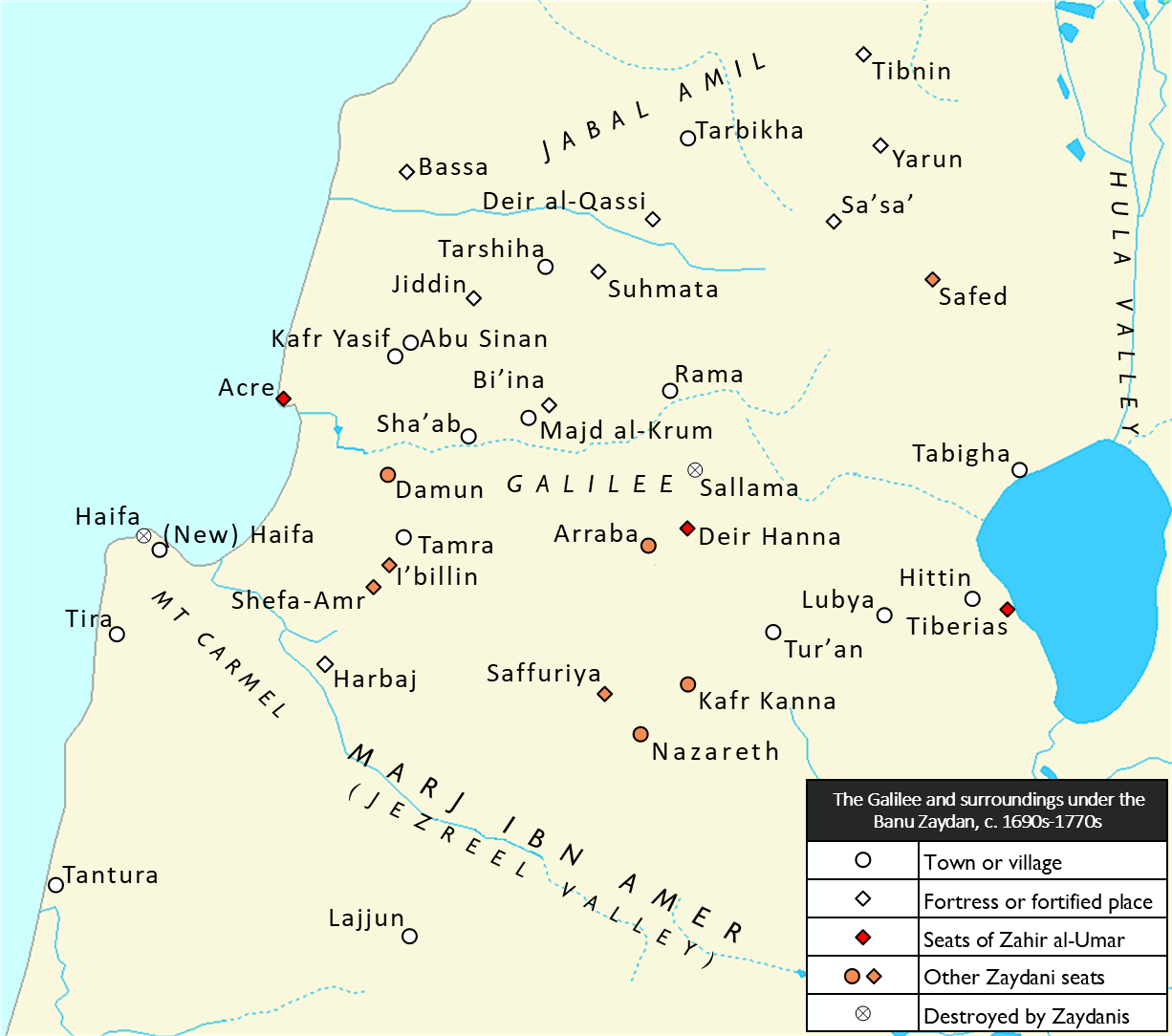
The holdings of the Zayadina under Daher in the Galilee and surrounding areas. Daher's seats are indicated in red, while the seats of other Zaydani sheikhs are in orange

To safeguard his interests in the Galilee, Daher installed his sons at strategic fortresses across the region. In the 1760s, many of his sons increasingly struggled against him and each other to expand their holdings in anticipation of their aging father's death. Besides support from elements of the Zayadina, Daher's sons maintained separate power bases, largely derived from their mothers' families, and formed alliances with other local powers.

In 1761, Daher detected a plot by his son Uthman and brother Sa'd, hitherto his chief adviser, to eliminate him. Daher turned Uthman to kill Sa'd, offering him control of Shefa-Amr in exchange. Although Sa'd was killed, Daher reneged on his offer, prompting Uthman and his brothers Ahmad and Sa'd al-Din to open an abortive siege of Shefa-Amr. In 1766, Uthman renewed his rebellion but was again defeated and reconciled with Daher. In September 1767, a conflict between Daher and his son Ali, who controlled Safed, broke out over Ali's attempts to obtain the key fortress of Deir Hanna. The ensuing series of skirmishes drew in Ali's full brother Sa'id, who sought to expand his own territories. The disputes were settled by December 1767, with Daher ceding Deir Hanna for token payment.

The rebellions by Daher's sons were nearly always backed by Uthman Pasha to sustain internal dissent and undermine Daher. The latter lodged complaints to the imperial government about Uthman Pasha's support for his rebellious sons at least once in 1765. Daher received the support of the governor of Sidon, Muhammad Pasha al-Azm, an opponent of Uthman Pasha who sought to restore the Azms to office in Damascus. While Sidon's backing had no military value, the support of his nominal superior provided Daher with official legitimacy amid his family's insurrections.

=== Alliance with the Metawalis ===
Daher's takeover of Safed and the western Galilee removed the barriers between him and the Twelver Shia Muslim clans of Jabal Amil, the hill country east of Tyre and Sidon, who were known as the 'Metawalis'. Their territory was wedged between the Druze clans led by the Shihab emirs in Mount Lebanon and the Zayadina in northern Palestine. In 1743, Nassar, the sheikh of the Ali al-Saghirs, the strongest Metawali clan, assisted government forces in their campaign against Daher. Around 1750, Nassar's successor, his son Daher al-Nassar, called for Daher's backing against the Shihabs, who had earlier sacked villages in Jabal Amil, killing hundreds of Metawalis. With Daher's support, the Ali al-Saghirs routed the Shihabs at Marjayoun. Daher al-Nassar died that year and was succeeded by his brother, Nasif al-Nassar.

Nasif and the other Metawali sheikhs backed Daher's son Uthman during his rebellion in 1766, and then his other son Ali in 1767. Amid the conflict, Daher captured the fortified Metawali villages of Bassa and Yaroun on the borders of Zaydani territory. While the chroniclers Haydar Rida al-Rukayni (d. 1784) and Mikha'il Sabbagh (d. 1816) agree that the capture of the two villages sparked the subsequent battles between Daher and Nasif, they diverge on the other details. After a series of clashes, the two sides fought at the village of Tarbikha on 6 October 1766, with Sabbagh claiming the battle ended in Daher's victory and Rukayni claiming the opposite. Thereafter, Daher's Maghrebi mercenaries supposedly employed a ruse by capturing two of Nasif's young sons from his headquarters, the Tibnin castle, compelling Nasif to negotiate terms. This account is considered a local legend by the historian Stefan Winter.

Despite their conflict, Daher and the Metawalis shared an interest in limiting Sidon's power and keeping the Druze emirs at bay. Daher's son Uthman secured a treaty between Daher and Nasif, dated to 24 November 1767. By its terms, Daher kept control of Bassa and Yaroun, represented the Metawalis in their fiscal relations with Sidon, and reduced their tax obligations by a quarter. Daher backed the Metawalis against the Druze, in return for the Metawalis' military support. He effectively became the multazim of Jabal Amil, greatly expanding his territory. The backing of thousands of Metawali fighters significantly boosted Daher's military potential, and the Metawalis participated in fifteen subsequent campaigns against Daher's foes. Further, the alliance secured Daher's northern borders, allowing him to focus on operations in the south.

== Zenith ==
In 1768, the imperial government granted Daher the title of 'Sheikh of Acre, Emir of Nazareth, Tiberias, Safed, and Sheikh of all of Galilee', a recognition of his de facto status. Daher was at the peak of his power, having consolidated his alliance with the Metawalis and reconciled with his sons. He possessed substantial financial resources, derived mainly from Acre's lucrative cotton trade. Despite securing his domestic position, he was vulnerable to outside threats. He had lost his main allies in Constantinople: Ya'qub Agha was executed in the 1760s and Sulayman Agha died in 1770. In September 1770, Uthman Pasha, determined to eliminate Daher, secured the appointment of his son, Darwish Pasha, as governor of Sidon, and recruited the Shihabs as allies. In October, Uthman Pasha entered Palestine to make the dawra, the annual tour to collect taxes earmarked for the Hajj. He threatened to assault Acre, prompting Daher to strengthen its fortifications and arm every man in the city, Muslim and Christian alike.

=== Alliance with Ali Bey and war with Damascus ===
The campaigns of Ali Bey al-Kabir against the Ottomans and Abu al-Dhahab's campaign against Daher's territories in Palestine

Bereft of support in Constantinople, Daher appealed to his ally Ali Bey al-Kabir, the increasingly autonomous shaykh al-balad (mamluk leader) of Egypt, to intervene against Uthman Pasha, their mutual foe. In Egypt, mamluks (manumitted slave soldiers), the remnant of the Mamluk Sultanate which ruled Egypt and Syria in 1260–1517, retained a military-political structure parallel to its Ottoman provincial army and administration. By the early 18th century, the shaykh al-balad's power superseded that of Egypt's Ottoman governor. (Note: Daher's relations with Ali Bey dated to at least 1766, when Ali Bey was exiled to Gaza and Daher promised to support his return to power in Egypt as shaykh al-balad. After Ali Bey regained power in Cairo, he exiled his treasurer, the Melkite Mikha'il al-Jamal, to Acre, where Daher's chief minister, the Melkite Ibrahim al-Sabbagh, persuaded Daher to lobby Ali Bey on Mikha'il's behalf. Ali Bey agreed to reinstate Mikha'il and back Daher in his struggles with Uthman Pasha, an enemy of Ali Bey from 1764, in return for European weapons Daher sent to Ali Bey in 1769.) Ali Bey aimed to expand his influence to Syria for strategic purposes. Political conditions favored the two leaders' cause, as the imperial government, bogged down in war with Russia, was ill positioned to confront a joint offensive by Ali Bey and Daher.

==== Assault on Damascus ====
Ali Bey launched the campaign in November 1770, dispatching land and sea expeditions to Palestine under his lieutenant Ismail Bey. His troops cleared Uthman Pasha's subordinates from Gaza and Ramla without resistance, then together with Daher occupied Jaffa, giving them control over most of Palestine. In a signal of Daher's failure to steer the campaign, in late January 1771, Ismail Bey rejected Daher's proposal to attack Uthman Pasha while he was leading the Hajj caravan, citing risk of harm to the pilgrims. In early March, Daher and Ismail Bey set up headquarters at Muzayrib, a fort on the Hajj caravan road. While waiting to intercept Uthman Pasha on his return from Mecca, Daher launched operations in Damascus province, sending his son Ahmad to capture Jabal Ajlun, other subordinates to collect taxes in the Jawlan, and his son Ali to raid the Nu'aym tribe in the Hauran. Whether due to the arrival of relief troops in Damascus or another dispute over attacking Uthman Pasha in the presence of pilgrims, Daher and Ismail Bey decamped from Muzayrib.

Ali Bey was nevertheless encouraged by his coalition's successes, dispatching reinforcements under his general Abu al-Dhahab. On 3 June, the rebel allies, with Daher's son Ali leading the vanguard, defeated Ottoman troops at Darayya and closed in on Damascus. On 6 June, Uthman Pasha fled and two days later, Damascus surrendered to Abu al-Dhahab. Daher and Nasif led a separate assault against Sidon, capturing the city on 11 June. On 18 June, Abu al-Dhahab surprised his allies and opponents alike by unilaterally withdrawing from Damascus. (Note: The 18th and 19th-century accounts reason that Abu al-Dhahab withdrew because Ismail Bey either convinced him to be wary of Daher and his sons' insolence and unyielding ambition or the dangerous folly of allying with Christian Russia against the interests of Islam, as represented by the Ottoman sultan. Historian Abdul-Karim Rafeq holds these were contributing factors, but that Abu al-Dhahab's own ambitions to unseat Ali Bey likely drove him to quit the campaign and return to Egypt.) The sudden turn of events and an attack by the Druze warriors of Yusuf Shihab (Note: Yusuf Shihab had replaced his uncle, Daher's ally Mansur Shihab, as the paramount emir of the Druze in Mount Lebanon. Yusuf Shihab was allied to Uthman Pasha and had been set to join his punitive expedition against Daher but did not arrive in time to prevent his defeat at the Battle of Lake Huleh. His intervention to restore Uthman Pasha's son Darwish Pasha to Sidon may have been to appease Uthman Pasha or to stem the power of Daher and the Metawalis of Nasif al-Nassar who supported the return of Mansur Shihab.) compelled Daher and Nasif to quit Sidon on 20 June. Darwish Pasha reentered Sidon and Uthman Pasha returned to Damascus on 26 June.

==== Captures of Jaffa and Sidon ====
Map showing phases of expansion of the territory controlled by Daher and his subordinates, c. 1772

Although Abu al-Dhahab's withdrawal embarrassed Daher, he was heartened by Ali Bey's determination to resume the campaign and resend troops. Daher captured Jaffa in August 1771, fortifying and garrisoning it with 2,000 men, and took over its cotton-rich hinterland, the Bani Sa'b. In August, Daher moved to eliminate Uthman Pasha's last significant ally in Palestine, the Jarrars of Jabal Nablus, by pressing his nearly yearlong siege of their fort at Sanur.

In response to the Jarrars' appeals for intervention, Uthman Pasha launched a campaign against Daher. Daher and his sons joined with their Metawali allies near Lake Huleh in anticipation of the governor's troops. In the ensuing battle, on 2 September, Uthman Pasha's army was nearly annihilated in a surprise assault; most drowned in the Jordan River after Daher's forces blocked the other escape routes. Daher returned to Acre in triumph on 5 September with the spoils of Uthman Pasha's camp.

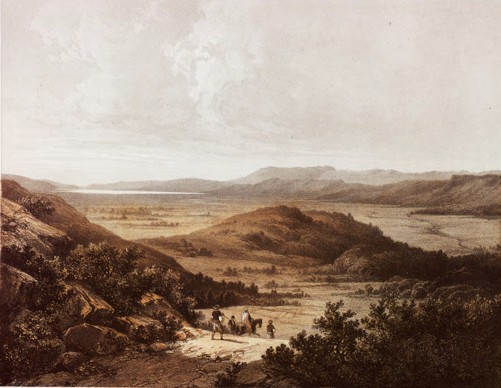
Drawing of Lake Huleh, 1857

On 20 October, Daher and the Metawalis routed Yusuf Shihab at Nabatieh, precipitating the withdrawal of his Druze forces from Sidon. Three days later, Daher and the Metawalis occupied the city, while Ali Bey's troops took Gaza and Ramla. The day before, Uthman Pasha and Darwish Pasha were dismissed from the governorships of Damascus and Sidon. Uthman Pasha was replaced by Muhammad Pasha al-Azm (r. 1771–1772, 1773–1783), but no governor was appointed to Sidon due to Daher's control of the city.

Daher's son Ali took over the fortified village of Bayt Jibrin between Ramla and Hebron in November and afterward raided the countryside of Damascus. Muhammad Pasha was compelled to request Daher's permission to embark on the Hajj caravan that year. Most of Palestine and the Hauran were in the hands of Daher or his allies, including the Jarrars of Jabal Nablus, who defected to Daher when Muhammad Pasha promoted their enemy, Mustafa Bey Tuqan. In late 1771, with the Jarrars' support, Daher besieged Nablus, the commercial center of Palestine. The city was defended by the Tuqan and Nimr families, urban rivals of the Jarrars, and their peasant riflemen. After nine days of clashes, Daher withdrew to avoid a costly stalemate. As he departed, his forces raided many of the city's satellite villages, from which its peasant defenders originated.

==== Setbacks ====
The imperial government appointed a serasker (supreme army commander), Uthman Pasha al-Wakil, to Damascus to support the governor against Ali Bey and the rebel chiefs led by Daher on 14 January 1772. Despite his high rank, Wakil lacked sufficient troops and funds to fight Daher and engaged in diplomacy after pressure from Damascenes desperate for economic relief from war and instability. In May 1772, the power balance shifted, with Ali Bey fleeing Egypt amid a power struggle with Abu al-Dhahab and taking refuge in Acre. With Daher's powerful ally unseated, local officials moved against him. In late May, a former governor of Gaza, Abu Maraq, took control of the city while the Tuqans took Jaffa. On 10 June, Daher and the Metawalis defeated Ottoman and Druze forces outside Sidon. Eight days later, at Daher's direction, Russian ships bombarded Beirut to divert Druze and Ottoman attention away from Sidon. Upon bribes from Yusuf Shihab, the Russians withdrew on 23 June. The aftermath remained chaotic, with Daher's wins against the Druze and Damascus indecisive, his forces contending with a difficult siege to retake Jaffa, and Ali Bey focused on regaining control of Egypt.

Daher and Ali Bey hoped to safeguard their control in Palestine as a springboard for Ali Bey to retake Egypt. Barring that, they would be left vulnerable between the Ottomans in Syria and Abu al-Dhahab in Egypt. After eight months of siege, Daher's forces recaptured Jaffa on 16 February 1773, enabling Ali Bey to embark on his Egypt campaign. Daher appointed his cousin and son-in-law Karim al-Ayyubi as governor of Jaffa and Gaza and sent troops under his son Salibi to back Ali Bey. On 28 April, Ali Bey was wounded and died in captivity and Salibi was slain by the forces of Abu al-Dhahab in Egypt. Their defeat ended the alliance that politically aligned Egypt and Palestine for the first time since the 16th century and posed the most serious internal challenge to Ottoman rule in the 18th century. Ali Bey was the focal point of the rebel alliance and his loss undermined Daher politically and militarily. Up to that point, Daher had rebuffed multiple attempts by Wakil and Muhammad Pasha to reconcile and abandon Ali Bey.

=== Tentative recognition by the Ottomans ===
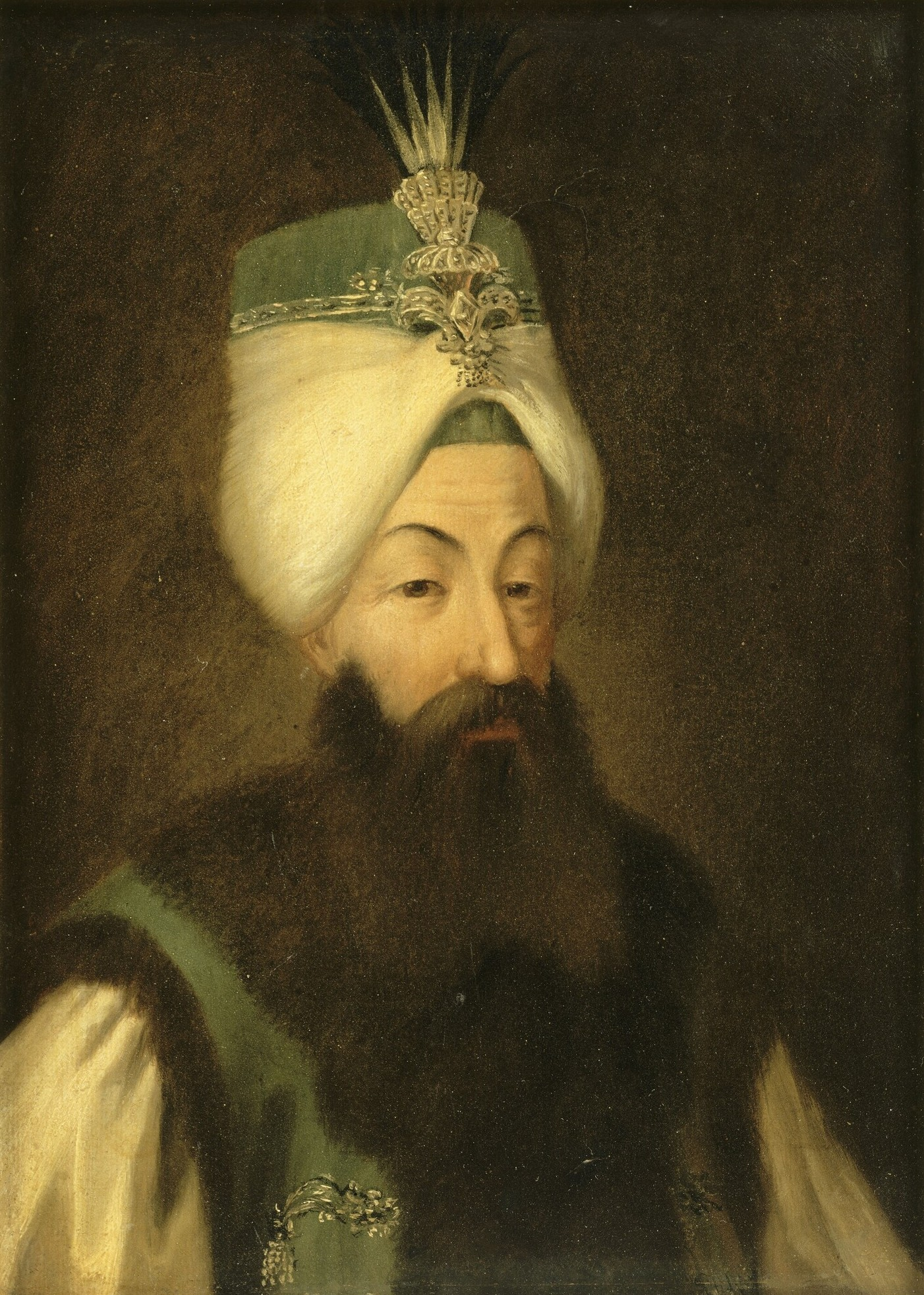
Portrait of Sultan Abdul Hamid I, 1788

The Ottomans shored up their position in Beirut, the only port they still controlled in southern Syria, by installing Ahmad Bey al-Jazzar to guard it against Daher in 1772. Yusuf Shihab opposed Jazzar's presence but the authorities rebuffed his request for Jazzar's removal. In response, the Shihabs allied with Daher and the Metawalis, meeting Daher's need for more allies amid the growing threat from Abu al-Dhahab. In June, the new governor of Damascus, Mustafa Pasha (r. 1772–1773), opened negotiations with Daher whereupon Daher declared he was no rebel and sought only to defend his people's rights. The talks collapsed when Russian ships commanded by Count Orlov bombarded Beirut on 6 July at Daher's behest, in conjunction with a land expedition sent by Daher under Dinkizli.

On 27 August, Abu al-Dhahab demanded Daher relinquish Gaza, Ramla, Jaffa and Nablus (likely meaning the Nablus countryside controlled by the Jarrars), all territories that Ali Bey had entrusted to Abu al-Dhahab during the 1771 campaign and which the Ottoman sultan had ratified. Shifting focus to Egypt, Daher recalled his men from Beirut, but sent his son Ali to assist the Shihabs defeat an Ottoman force in the Beqaa Valley on 30 September. In early October, the siege of Beirut by the Shihabs and the Russian navy compelled Jazzar to quit the city and take refuge with Daher, who agreed to safeguard him in return for his services. Days later, Daher commissioned Jazzar to collect taxes from the Jaffa-Jerusalem area, but Jazzar absconded with the transport animals and weapons Daher equipped him with to Damascus.

Unable to rein in Daher, the Ottomans negotiated with him. As a goodwill gesture, the Damascus authorities returned to him the livestock and munitions Jazzar had seized and formally recognized his son Ahmad's governorship of Jabal Ajlun. Daher, convinced of an impending military assault by Abu al-Dhahab, welcomed the overtures. He dropped his demand for appointment as beylerbey (provincial governor) of Sidon, agreed to pay his tax arrears, future tax obligations, and Sidon's customary funds for the Hajj caravan, and vowed loyalty to the state. An agreement was reached in late January 1774, granting Daher a pardon from the sultan, the malikane (life-term tax arm) of Sidon, and the iltizam of Nablus, Gaza, Ramla, Jaffa and Ajlun. The letter of appointment from Wakil, dated to 9 February, was proclaimed on 17 February in Daher's court in Acre, where he was further awarded the khil'a (robe of honor).

Wakil's agreement was subject to ratification by the new sultan, Abdul Hamid I (r. 1774–1789), who acceded in January. In July, the sultan dismissed Wakil from Syria, and signed a peace treaty with Russia. The agreements reached between Daher and Wakil after yearslong negotiations had become void. Further, the imperial government, freed up from the Russian war, refocused resources on Syria. Muhammad Pasha, who had been restored as governor of Damascus in October 1773, advised Daher to pursue a new agreement. Daher's outreach to Grand Vizier Izzet Mehmed Pasha led to a sultanic order in January 1775 pardoning Daher and restating his financial obligations, but neither conferring upon him the desired malikane of Sidon nor the iltizam of the Palestinian districts he de facto controlled in Damascus Eyalet. Formal recognition was restricted to his status as a multazim.

== Fall ==
=== Abu al-Dhahab's campaign ===
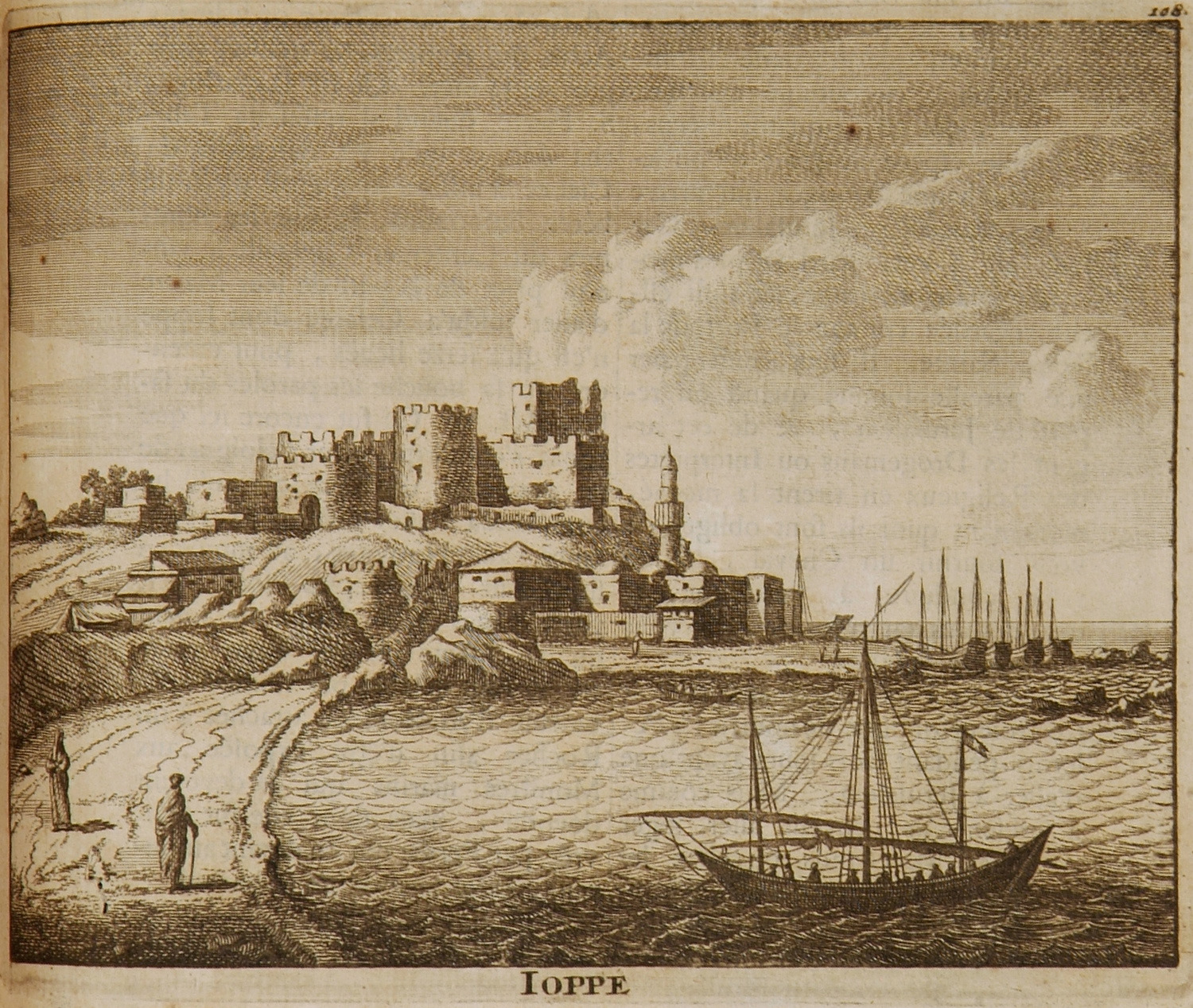
Sketch of Jaffa, 1714

Conflict between Daher and his sons resumed in the summer of 1774 as they vied to succeed him. Ali renewed demands for more Galilee villages and defeated Daher in a battle at the village of Rameh on 11 July. Abu al-Dhahab used the internal strife to move against Daher, allying with Ali. With the imperial government's approval or encouragement, he launched his campaign in Palestine in March 1775. Gaza surrendered on 1 April, followed immediately by Ramla. Daher's forces in Jaffa refused to capitulate and the mamluks besieged the town on 3 April, capturing it on 20 May. Abu al-Dhahab executed all the men of Jaffa, took captive the women and children, and plundered the town.

News of the Jaffa massacre spurred panic and mass flight by Acre's residents on 23 May. Daher departed the following day for Sidon. Acre surrendered to a small mamluk naval force on 30 May, and Abu al-Dhahab appointed Murad Bey as its governor. The mamluks turned on Ali and captured Safed, while their naval forces captured Sidon and Beirut, prompting Daher to take refuge with the Metawalis in the mountains.

On 10 June, Abu al-Dhahab fell ill and died, prompting the immediate withdrawal of his troops to Egypt. Daher reentered Acre two days later and reestablished order. He restored control over Jaffa and Gaza as well, but the Ottomans took Sidon. Although Daher preserved his rule, the mamluk campaign sapped his strength. Neither his sons nor his allies among the Metawalis and the Druze had responded to his calls for support against Abu al-Dhahab. The near-contemporary historian Volney blamed Daher's chief minister Ibrahim al-Sabbagh's withholding of pay to the Metawali and Druze leaders and aid to Jaffa for their standby posture.

=== Siege of Acre and death ===
The death of Abu al-Dhahab did not deter the Ottomans from moving against Daher. On 7 August, a flotilla under the kapudan (admiral) Hasan Pasha al-Jaza'iri arrived outside Haifa, whose garrison of Maghrebi mercenaries immediately surrendered the town. (Note: One version in the sources has Hasan Pasha dispatched from Constantinople on 23 April 1775 with the dual missions of blockading Daher and exercising imperial oversight over Abu al-Dhahab's campaign in Syria. While Constantinople was cognizant or even supportive of Abu al-Dhahab's offensive against Daher, the Ottomans were wary he would exceed his mandate, officially limited to control of southern Palestine, and emulate Ali Bey's attempt at an autonomous government over Egypt and Syria. The other version has Hasan Pasha deployed after news of Abu al-Dhahab's death to prevent chaos or military gains by Daher.) Hasan Pasha's assignment was to collect Daher's tax arrears. (Note: Along with Hasan Pasha's naval expedition, the Ottomans organized an army led by Muhammad Pasha al-Azm, governor of Damascus, which was supported by the troops of Jerusalem under its mutasarrif Ibrahim Pasha, Sidon, Adana, and forces under the command of Ahmad Bey al-Jazzar. Wary of Daher's capabilities, Muhammad Pasha sought to avoid directly engaging him and moved slowly to determine the outcome of Hasan Pasha's campaign.) Daher was ensconced in Acre with Dinkizli's Maghrebi troops when Hasan Pasha's flotilla appeared before its walls. Negotiations followed regarding payment.

There are several accounts about the talks' collapse, all involving sabotage by Daher's chief advisers Sabbagh and Dinkizli and animated by their mutual hostility. Most early sources hold Daher was prepared to make the required payment but was dissuaded by Sabbagh against the counsel of Dinkizli, who advocated a settlement. (Note: This version of events is cited by the contemporary or near contemporary Lebanese chronicler Haydar Ahmad al-Shihabi (1761–1835), French historian Volney (1757–1820), the Nazareth clergyman Mikha'il Qa'war, and an anonymous, likely Syrian, writer living in Egypt. Ibrahim evidently undercounted the eight ships in Hasan Pasha's flotilla, aware only of the three ships that had docked outside Haifa (the others were docked in Jaffa's harbor).) In this version, Dinkizli preferred to bribe Hasan Pasha and secured a pardon for Daher in return for a lesser settlement. Sabbagh argued that Daher lacked funds, which Daher affirmed, and that Hasan Pasha's flotilla could be repulsed. Dinkizli advised Daher to extract the necessary funds from Sabbagh personally, accusing him of hoarding substantial wealth. When Daher sided with Sabbagh, Dinkizli secretly ordered his mercenaries to hold their fire against Hasan Pasha's ships, citing the inviolabality of the sultan as caliph of Islam. The other version of events, cited by Sabbagh's grandsons, Mikha'il Sabbagh and Abbud Sabbagh, holds that Daher had agreed to pay but that Dinkizli betrayed Daher in the negotiations, secretly encouraging the admiral to capture Acre and confiscate Daher's and Sabbagh's wealth.

Hasan Pasha was likely uninterested in the success of the negotiations. He bombarded Acre, and Daher's Maghrebi artillerymen responded with cannon fire, damaging two Ottoman ships. The following day, Hasan Pasha's fleet resumed shelling without receiving any return fire, evidently due to Dinkizli's orders. Realizing his long-time lieutenant's betrayal, Daher fled Acre on 21 or 22 August, escaping through the Bab al-Saraya gate that opened to the city's northern gardens. As he exited the city, Daher's Maghrebi mercenaries opened fire on him and a bullet struck his neck, knocking him off his horse. A Maghrebi soldier then decapitated him and delivered his head to Hasan Pasha, who took it to Constantinople, "formal evidence of the elimination of one of the sultan's most tenacious and persistent rebels", in the words of historian Daniel Crecelius.

=== Aftermath ===
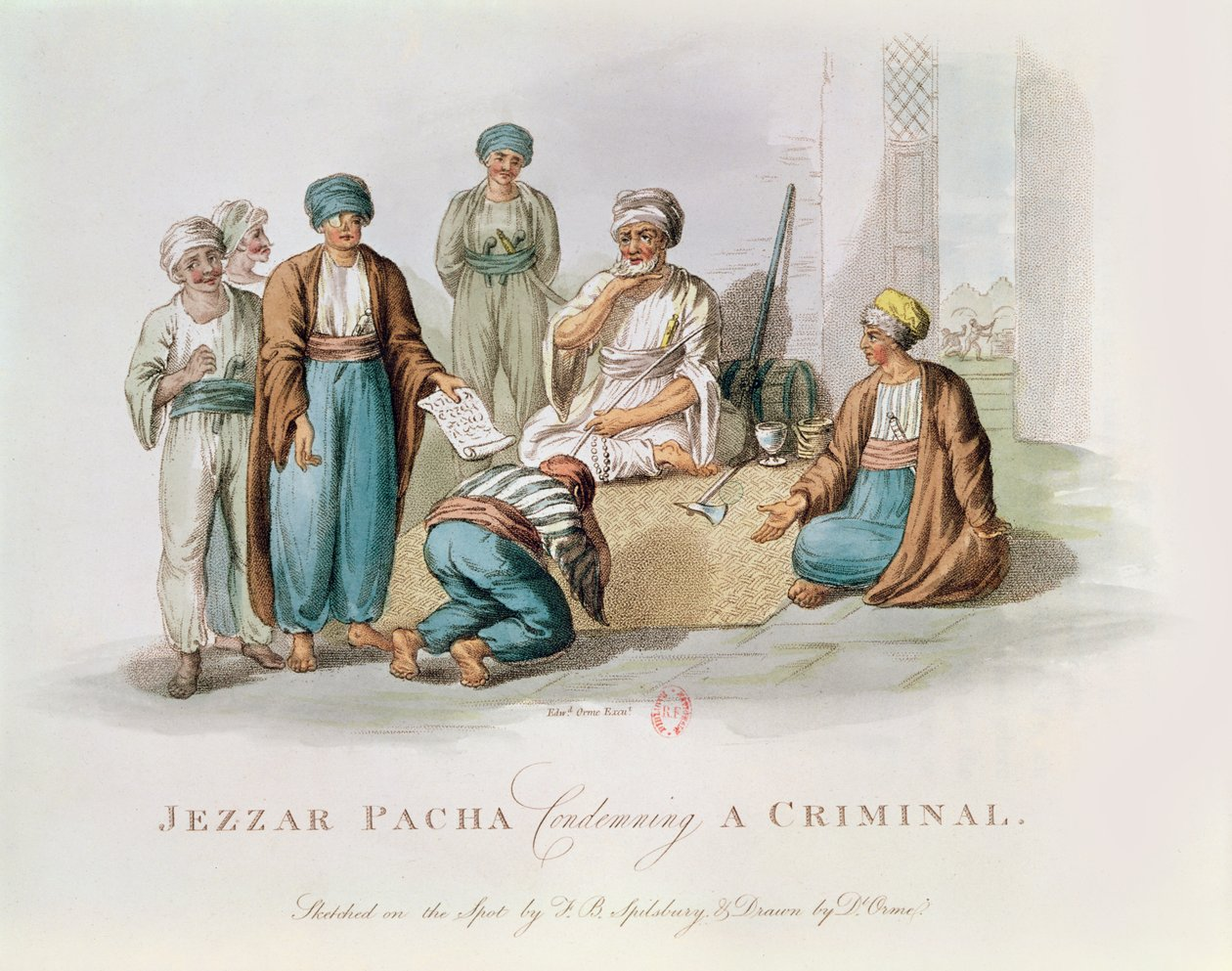
Ahmad Pasha al-Jazzar, seated (center) at his court in Acre, 1800

Sabbagh was captured and executed by Hasan Pasha, who confiscated his and Daher's treasures in Acre. Dinkizli was ostensibly rewarded by Hasan Pasha with the governorship of Gaza, but died or was killed on the way to assuming office. Daher's governor in Jaffa, Muhammad Abu Ghurrah, put up resistance but eventually escaped to the Galilee. Hasan Pasha transferred control of Acre to Jazzar on 19 September and the Ottomans appointed him governor of Sidon in mid-October. Jazzar governed the province from Acre until his death in 1804.

With their fortified villages, private armies and a supportive population, Daher's sons remained ensconced in the Galilee and represented the main obstacle to Jazzar's authority. Daher's son Uthman defected to Jazzar in return for keeping control of Shefa-Amr and a promise to appoint him shaykh al-mashayikh (chief of chiefs) of Safed, but Ali, with the support of his brothers Ahmad, Sa'id and Salih, remained incalcitrant and controlled all the Galilee from Tiberias and Safed in the east to Majd al-Krum and Abu Sinan in the west. Ali was defeated in a series of battles, culminating in a lengthy siege of Deir Hanna, which fell on 22 July 1776. (Note: Preceding the siege of Deir Hanna, Jazzar defeated Ali in battles outside Majd al-Krum and then in Rameh by June 1776. Among those taken prisoner after the surrender of Deir Hanna, despite promises of aman (safe conduct), were Daher's son Sa'id and grandson Fadil al-Ali, Ali's kethuda (chief aide) Yusuf Dabbur, and garrison commander, the ex-governor of Jaffa Muhammad Abu Ghurrah.) Ali launched a counteroffensive but was assassinated by agents of Muhammad Pasha in November 1776, signaling the end to Zaydani power. (Note: With Ali's elimination, Jazzar no longer had political use for Daher's other sons, several of whom had defected to him during his campaign. Uthman, Ahmad, Salih, Sa'd al-Din and Sa'id and at least some of their children were sent as prisoners to Constantinople. Uthman was eventually appointed governor of Jeddah; Ali's son Fadil was made governor of Rhodes and became a respected writer in the imperial capital; and Ahmad's son Yusuf became a senior employee of the government's translation office. Daher's younger son Abbas remained in the Galilee and met with Napoleon in Nazareth during his invasion of Palestine in 1799 where the two discussed the Zayadina allying with France. Jazzar defeated Napoleon's siege of Acre and Abbas and Salih, who had returned to Palestine, both left with the French. Abbas left Paris and returned to Nazareth, dying there in 1811. Abbas's son Husayn was appointed mutasallim of Nazareth in 1850.)

== Policies ==
=== Security ===
Before Daher's consolidation of power, the villages of northern Palestine were vulnerable to Bedouin raids and roads were under constant threat from highwaymen. Peasants were left destitute but still responsible for their tax obligations, spurring many to abandon their villages. By 1746, Daher had established law and order throughout his territory, fostering its prosperity. His co-optation of the Saqr Bedouins significantly enhanced general security. He entrusted the sheikhs of the villages with guaranteeing the safety of the roads in their respective areas and required them to compensate victims of robbery. Security reached a level whereby "an old woman with gold in her hand could travel from one place to another without fear or danger", according to Mikha'il Sabbagh. The resulting stability contributed to an economic boom in the Galilee from the mid-1740s to mid-1760s, encouraging immigration from other parts of the empire. Conflict with local potentates and between Daher and his sons remained limited to periodic clashes, while there were no external attacks against Daher's domains.

=== Cotton monopoly ===
European demand for Palestinian cotton skyrocketed in the 18th century and all of Daher's activities were linked to the cotton trade. His establishment of law and order secured the flow of cotton to the French merchants of Acre and encouraged immigration to its hinterland, further boosting cultivation. The profits generated fueled Daher's political and military power, sustaining his commercial success. (Note: Cotton became Palestine's chief commodity starting in the late 17th century, with European demand skyrocketing in the early 18th century. The French merchants of Marseille dominated the trade from their base in Sidon, with subordinates operating in Acre. They developed a forward market system, advancing cash to the multazims who controlled the agricultural output of the villages, often directly paying their tax obligations, in return for exclusive purchase rights of their cotton at fixed prices. The effective founder of this system in Palestine was the Acre-based Dutch merchant Paul Maashook. He gained exclusive control of the cotton supply from the villages on the plain of Acre and the area around Shefa-Amr in the early 1700s by the acquiring sole purchase rights from their multazims, Sheikh Najm of Jiddin and Daher's uncle Ali, in exchange for advancing the money for their tax obligations to the governor of Sidon. The more numerous French merchants of Acre gradually emulated Maashook, carrying on this system after his death in 1711. The Zayadina were among the primary beneficiaries of this system.) Daher first dealt with the French merchants in 1730 and engaged them throughout the decade. In 1737, he and the French consul of Sidon regulated a standard unit of weight for Galilee cotton. Despite their cooperation, in 1741, the consul complained that Daher was becoming overly empowered and wealthy at the merchants' expense. To avoid alienating the Ottoman state, the French refrained from intensive dealings with Daher. His trade relations with the French became systemic after 1742–1743, when he demonstrated his strength by withstanding the assaults on his territory by the governor of Damascus. An agreement was reached between Daher and the French vice consul of Acre, Joseph Blanc, whereby Blanc covered Daher's tax obligations and supplied him with firearms in exchange for exclusive purchase rights of Daher's cotton and wheat.

With his control of Acre solidified by 1750, Daher effectively monopolized the transport and sale of cotton. The French attempted to organize against this in 1751 by dictating prices well below the rate set by Daher, who responded with a trade ban on the French. A French merchant's letter described Daher's empowered status during the standoff: "He was no longer what he was ten years ago; today, he makes the laws." That case ended in a compromise, but tensions escalated through the early 1750s. Daher's attempt to circumvent the French by marketing to English merchants failed since the French maintained unrivaled shipping capacity from the Syrian coast. At the same time, Daher's control over production and overland transport made him indispensable as the merchants' only viable middleman. Daher strictly enforced his monopoly, jailing merchants and local brokers for bypassing him. With his takeover of Jaffa in 1771, Daher extended his monopoly to the cotton-rich valleys of Jabal Nablus and Bani Sa'b, which had been controlled by the merchants of Nablus.

Daher's price control of the local cash crops protected the peasants from the European merchants' price manipulations. Daher aided the peasants cultivate and harvest their farmlands to ensure the steady supply of crops for export. These benefits included loans and free seed distribution. He reduced their financial burdens, offering tax relief during dry seasons or poor harvests. This same tax relief was extended to newcomers cultivating new farmlands. Before his monopoly, Daher assumed responsibility for peasants' outstanding debts to merchants. According to Philipp, Daher "had the good business sense not to exploit peasants to the point of destruction, but kept his financial demands to a more moderate level".

=== Development ===
Daher's rule radically changed the urban landscape of the Galilee. He invested his wealth from the cotton trade into developing his domains, especially northern Palestine's key towns, Tiberias, Nazareth, Acre and Haifa, all of which had been small and decaying villages before his rule. Historian Mahmoud Yazbak credits Daher for these towns' revival and socioeconomic rise, which put them on par with Nablus, hitherto Palestine's principal commercial center. Daher and his family built fortresses, watchtowers, warehouses, and khans (caravanserais). These buildings improved the domestic administration and security of the Galilee. Today, many are in a state of disrepair and remain outside the scope of Israel's cultural preservation laws. With the restoration and refortification of Acre and the reestablishment of Haifa, the Galilee's ties with the Mediterranean world were significantly strengthened.

Daher governed with religious tolerance and encouraged the immigration of Christians and Jews and their participation in the local economy. This was at least partly due to their relative ease in dealing with Christian European merchants, the financial support networks many of them maintained in Damascus or Constantinople, and their role in service industries. Daher's territory became a haven for Melkites (Greek Catholics) and Greek Orthodox from other parts of Ottoman Syria, who migrated there for better trade and employment opportunities.

==== Tiberias ====
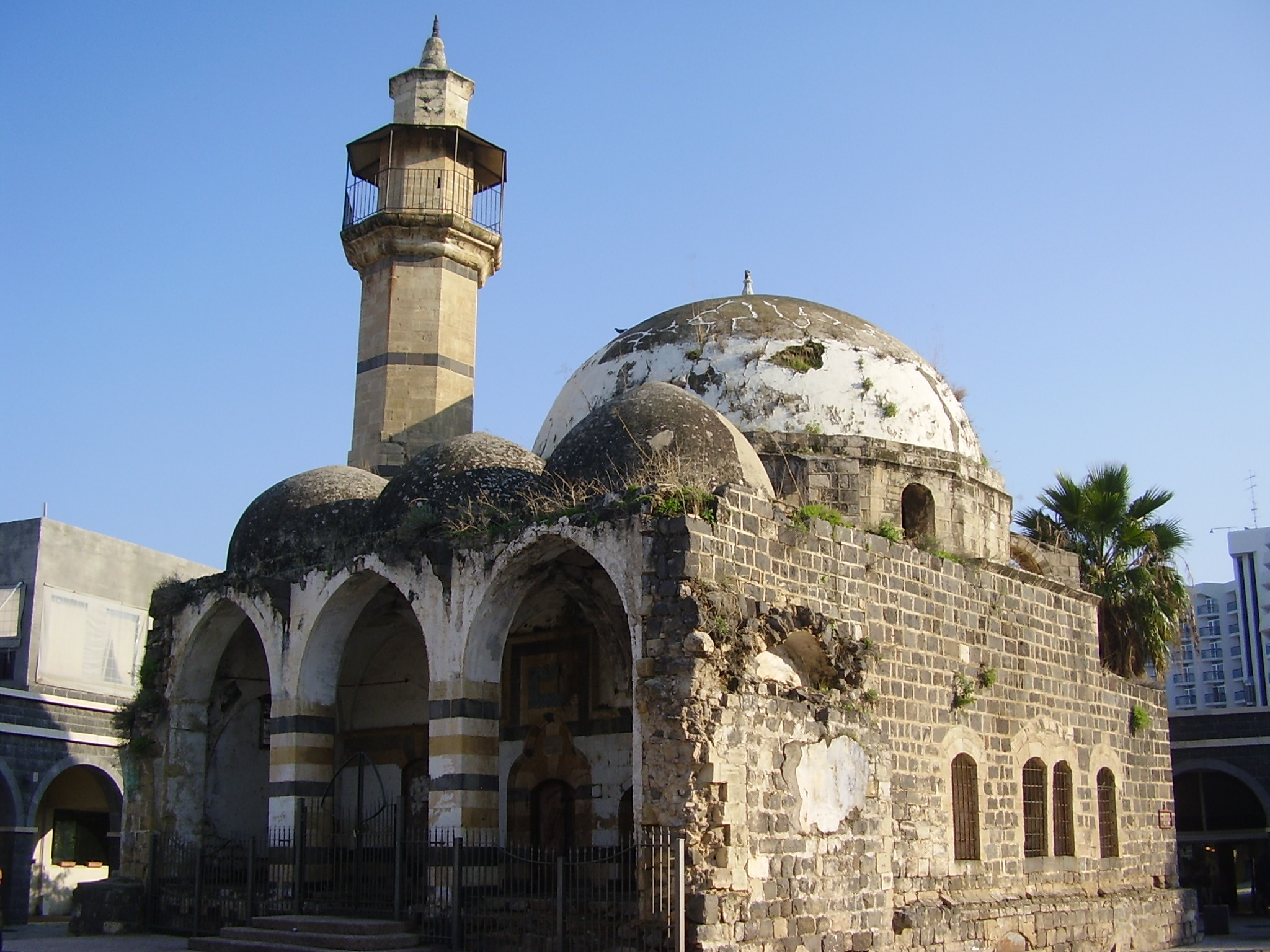
Daher's mosque in Tiberias

Before Daher made it his first capital, Tiberias had consisted of a few houses strung among ruins. Daher built up its fortifications. Part of the walls ran along the shore of the Sea of Galilee and had eighteen towers. They were severely damaged in the 1837 earthquake. Most of the walls have been destroyed or form part of modern structures, while eight of the towers are extant.

In 1740, Daher invited Rabbi Hayyim Abulafia of Smyrna to settle in Tiberias with his congregants, allotting them lands and financial assistance to build their houses and a synagogue and school and exempting them from taxation for three years. (Note: Jewish communities were also established in the villages of Kafr Yasif and Shefa-Amr under Daher's watch.) Daher believed their connections with the Jewish diaspora would encourage economic development in Tiberias, which the Jews considered particularly holy. His policies fostered the growth of the Jewish community. Muslims also settled in Tiberias. Daher built a mosque in the town center, characterized by its use of ablaq (alternating bands), typical of Daher's building works. While there have been restorations, the mosque retains its original plan.

==== Nazareth ====
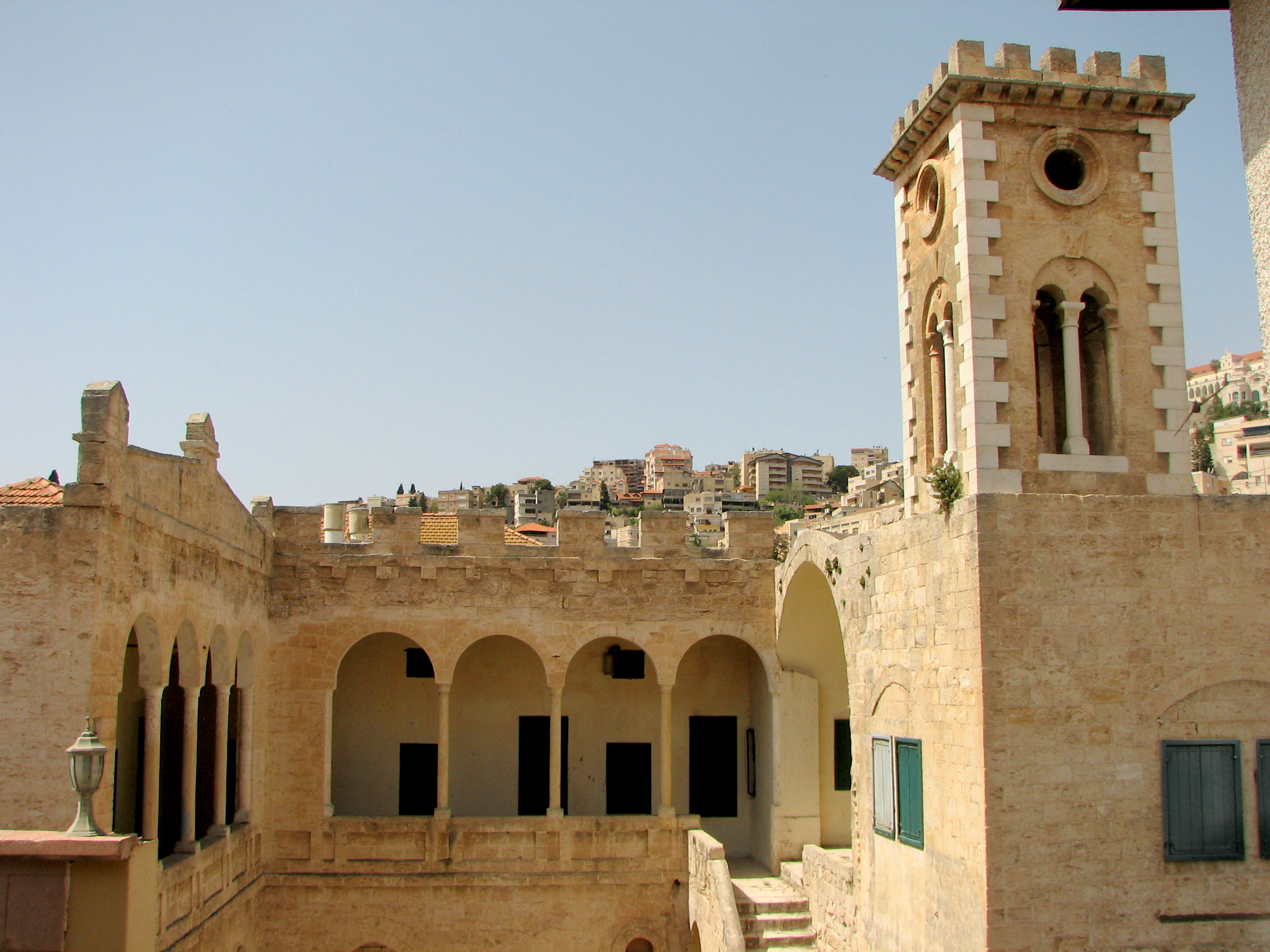
The Seraya of Nazareth, built by Daher

In Nazareth, Daher built his summer residence. It later served as Nazareth's municipal headquarters until 1990. Daher secured the town with a garrison, deterring Bedouin raids and encouraging its repopulation, especially attracting Christians drawn by Nazareth's religious importance. The Christian community prospered and grew, receiving an influx of Maronites and Greek Orthodox from Mount Lebanon and Transjordan, respectively.

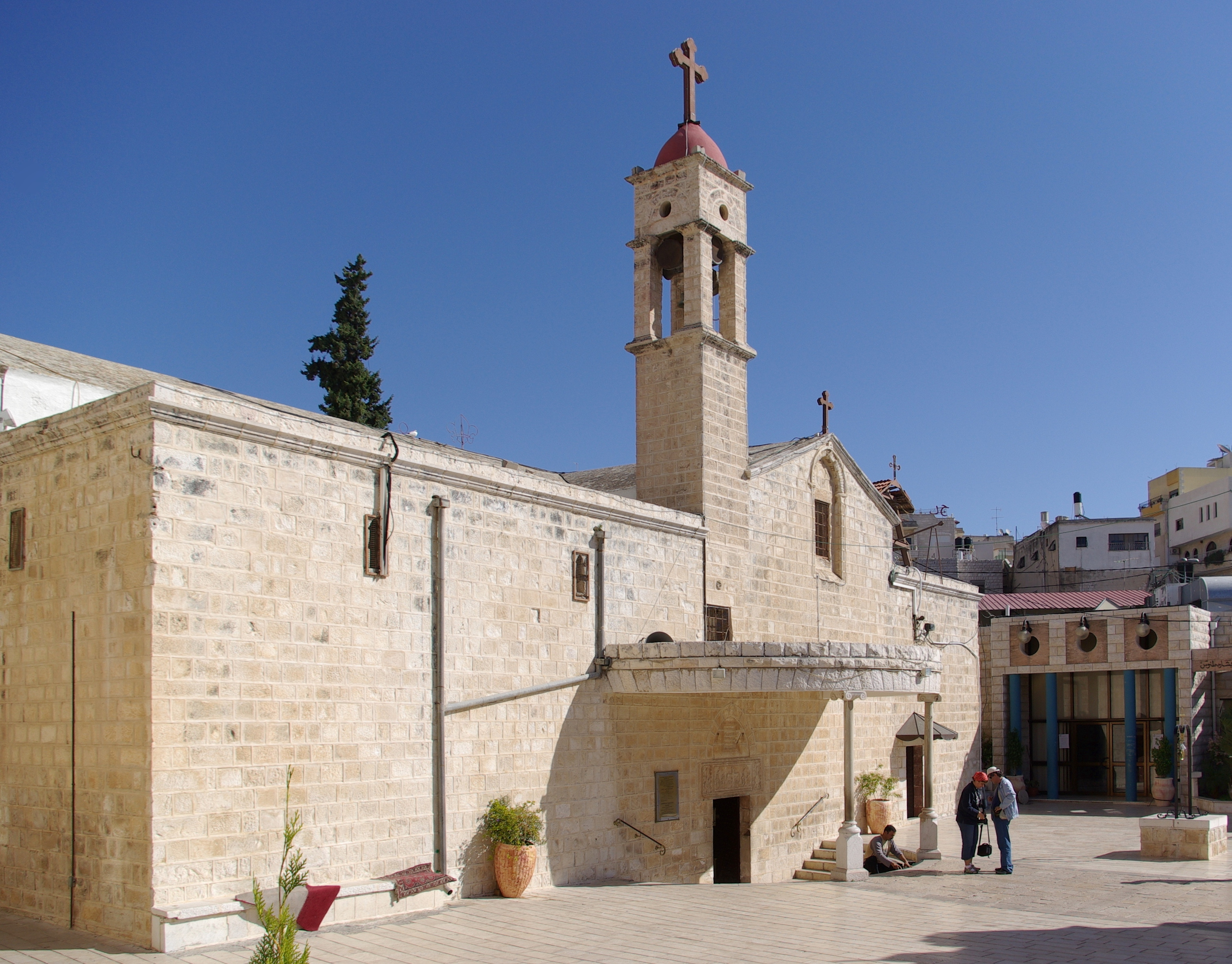
St. Gabriel Church in Nazareth was built under the auspices of Daher's rule

By the 1760s, three churches were built for the Roman Catholics, Greek Orthodox and Maronites: Daher permitted the Franciscans to build churches in 1741 and 1754 on sites Christians associated with the life of Jesus. He allowed the Greek Orthodox to build St. Gabriel's Church over a ruined Crusader church, and, in 1750, to enlarge St. George's Church. Commenting on Nazareth's resurgence under Daher, the contemporary traveler Giovanni Mariti wrote

[Daher] had philosophy enough to rise above the prejudices of religion ... His policy rightly foresaw, that the affection which the Christians had for Nazareth would draw thither a great number of them. On this account he received them with open arms; and, for their convenience, enlarged such of the houses as were too small and confined.

==== Acre ====
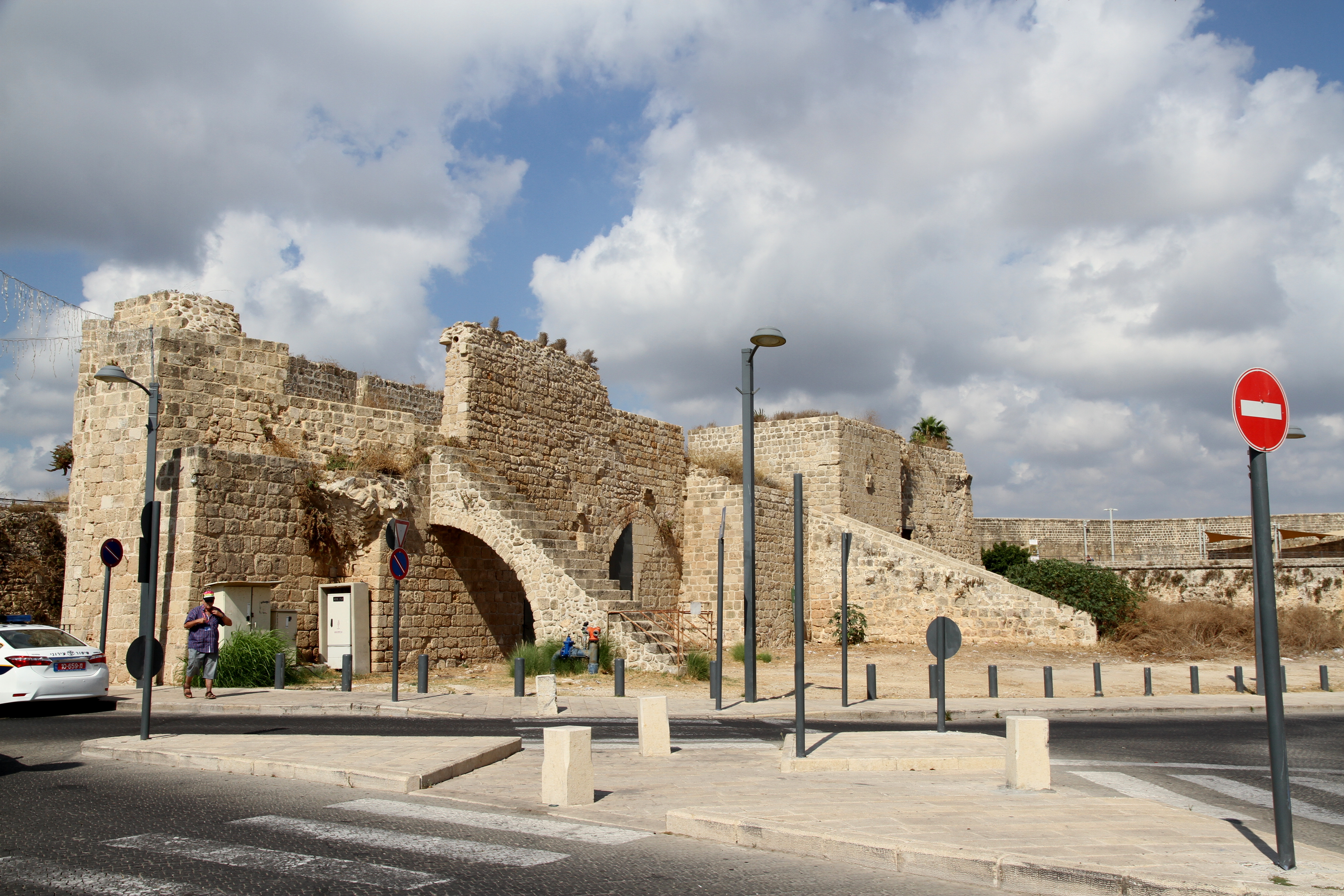
Section of the walls of Acre built by Daher in 1750

Daher extensively redeveloped Acre, building its walls, roads and public institutions, including khans, bazaars, mosques, churches, bathhouses and coffeehouses. Although considerable in its extent, Daher's wall was designed to ward off pirates and Bedouin raiders, and could not defend well against the Ottoman military. Under Jazzar, a major reconstruction was undertaken. Part of Daher's contributions are extant, mainly a section of the northeastern wall, and are characterized by small stone blocks. An inscription dated to 1750 credits Daher as the builder:

By the order of Allah this wall was erected in ʿAkkā [Acre] by a nobleman who generously acted.
The father of the heroes he is, the beloved Ẓāhir.
May Allah reinforce his government forever.

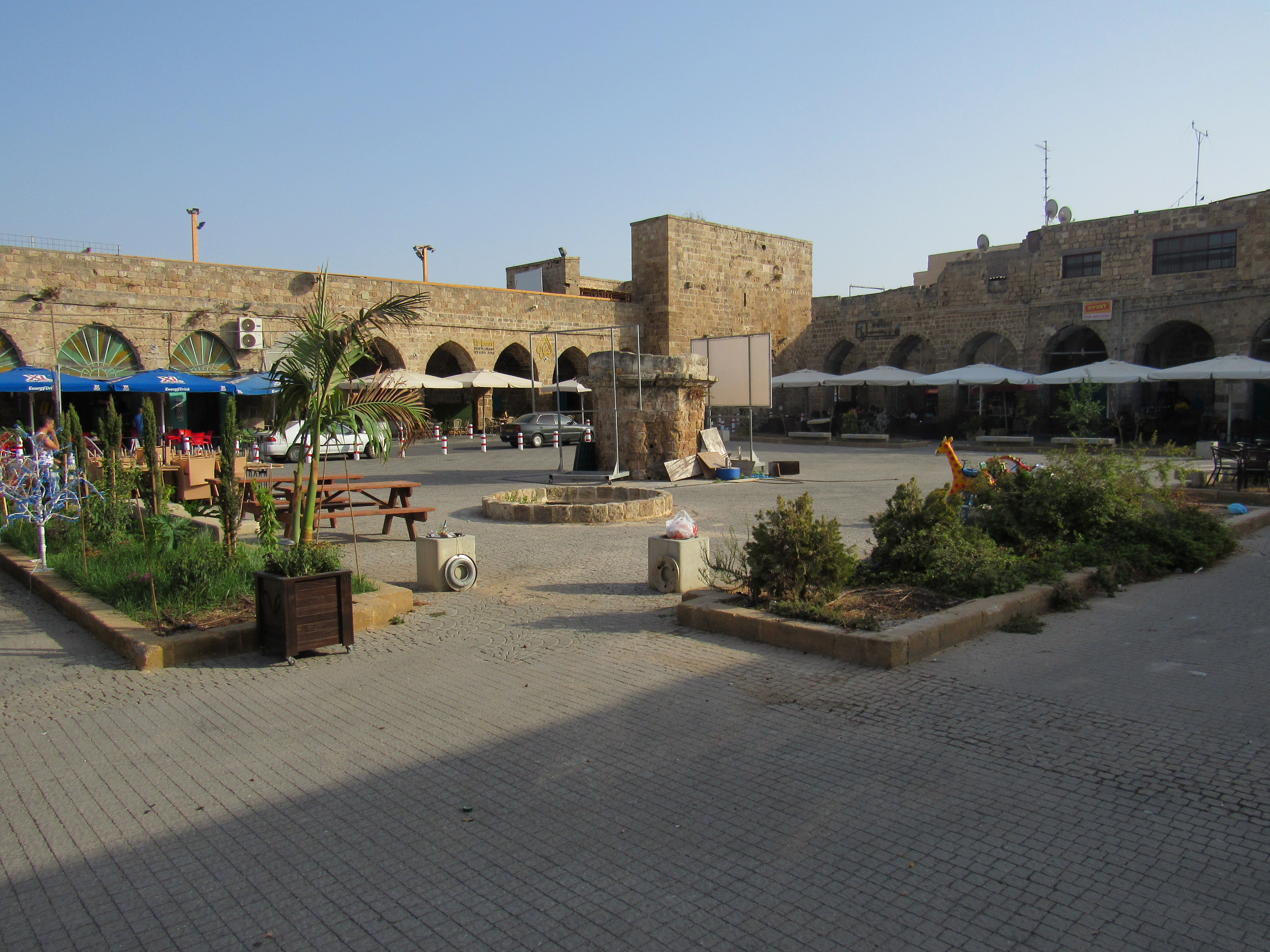
The Khan al-Shawarda caravanserai was restored by Daher

Among the ruined Crusader and Mamluk structures Daher repurposed or restored were Khan al-Shawarda and its Burj al-Sultan tower and Khan al-Shunah. The original structure of the Suq al-Abyad (the White Bazaar), located in the northeastern corner of the walled city, was built by Daher, though most of the present structure dates to an 1815 reconstruction by Acre's governor, Sulayman Pasha. In 1748, Daher founded the Muallaq Mosque, which had been a synagogue; he compensated its Jewish worshippers with property elsewhere in the city.

Security and financial incentives encouraged economic renewal and a constant migration of Christians and Muslims to both Acre and the surrounding villages. Daher's mild disposition, religious tolerance and low taxes and customs all served to attract new arrivals, including many merchants from Sidon seeking to avoid the heavy exactions of its governors. To further stimulate Acre's growth, he invited Greek Orthodox Christians from Cyprus to settle the city. Christians became the city's largest religious group by the late 18th century. The Melkite patriarch was based in Acre between 1765 and 1768. Melkites built the city's largest church, St. Andrew's Church, in 1764, while the Maronites built St. Mary's Church in 1750. As a testament to the exceptional prosperity Christians enjoyed under Daher, no more churches were built under his less tolerant successors in Acre. Acre's growing economic importance drew Turkish and Arab merchants from Damascus, joining their French, English and Dutch counterparts. The population skyrocketed from 300 at the start of the 18th century to 20,000 by the 1760s, making Acre the third largest city in Syria after Damascus and Aleppo and a prosperous entrepôt between Europe and the Ottoman Empire.

==== Haifa ====
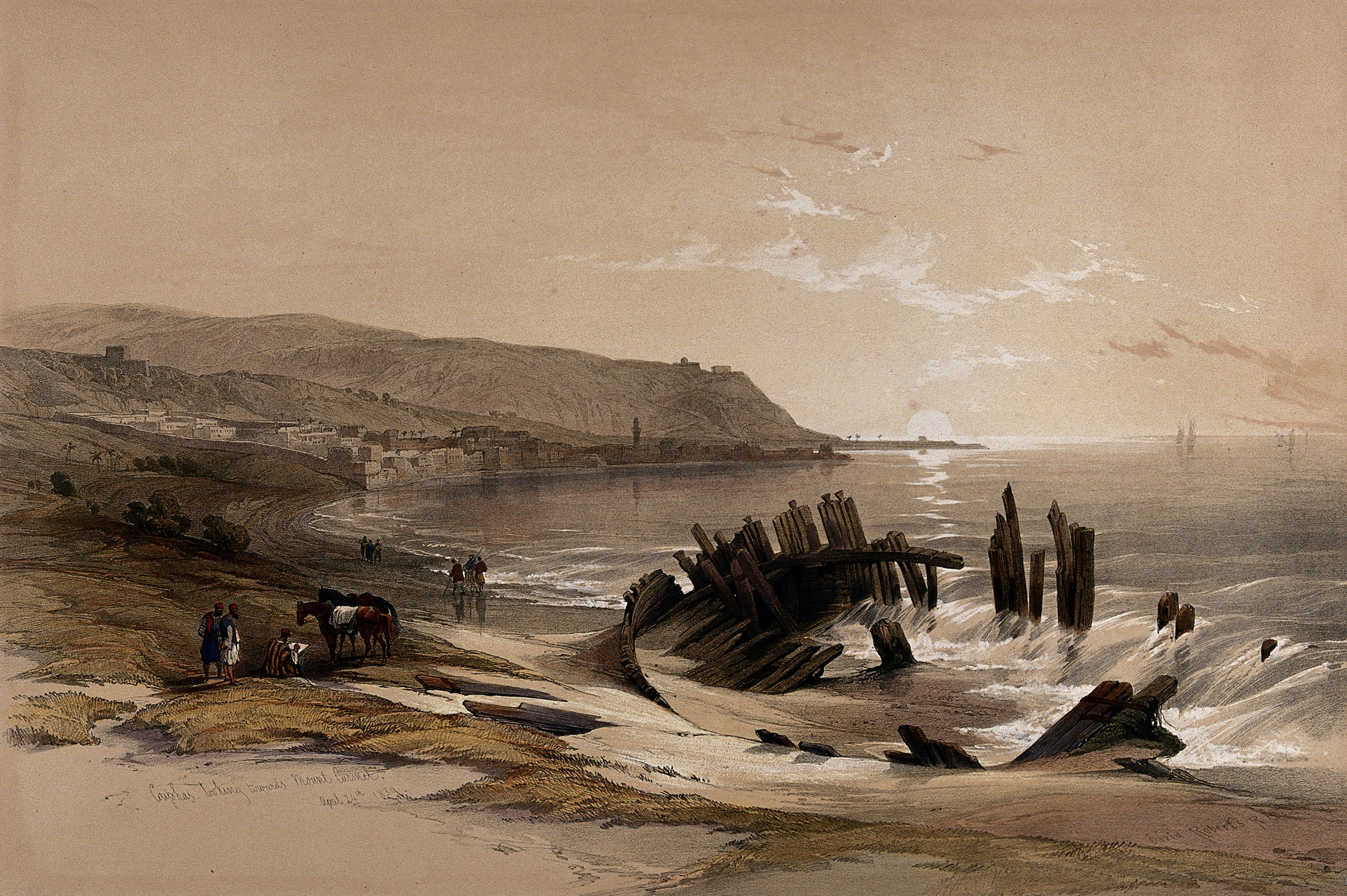
The walled harbor town of Haifa (background), founded and fortified by Daher, 1839

Daher similarly redeveloped Haifa, though on a lesser scale. He ended its long-established smuggling operations and use as a haven for Maltese pirates. Between 1765 and 1769, Daher had old Haifa demolished. While the old village sat on a plain, he built new Haifa 3 kilometers (1.9 mi) to the southeast on a narrow strip at the northern foot of Mount Carmel to make it easier to defend by land. He dug wells and built a wall with four towers and two gates, a custom's house, a saray (governor's residence) for his deputy, and a small souk to serve the ships docked there. The walls stood at least until the early 19th century, when David Roberts sketched them. Daher also built a two-story square tower, the Burj al-Salam (Tower of Peace), which remained intact until the 1970s. The remains of his saray became the site of Haifa's Sail Tower.

Although Acre was the locus of trade, Haifa was used as a safe winter harbor. With mixed success, Daher attempted to redirect French ships from Tyre and Sidon to Haifa, in order to benefit from the customs fees he could exact. Many of Haifa's new settlers were Christians. Compared to Acre, Haifa remained small, with 250 residents in the 1770s, but its economy thrived as merchants there more easily evaded Daher's monopolies. Daher also built a congregational mosque in Haifa, the al-Jarina Mosque, though most of the present building is a later construction.

==== Villages ====
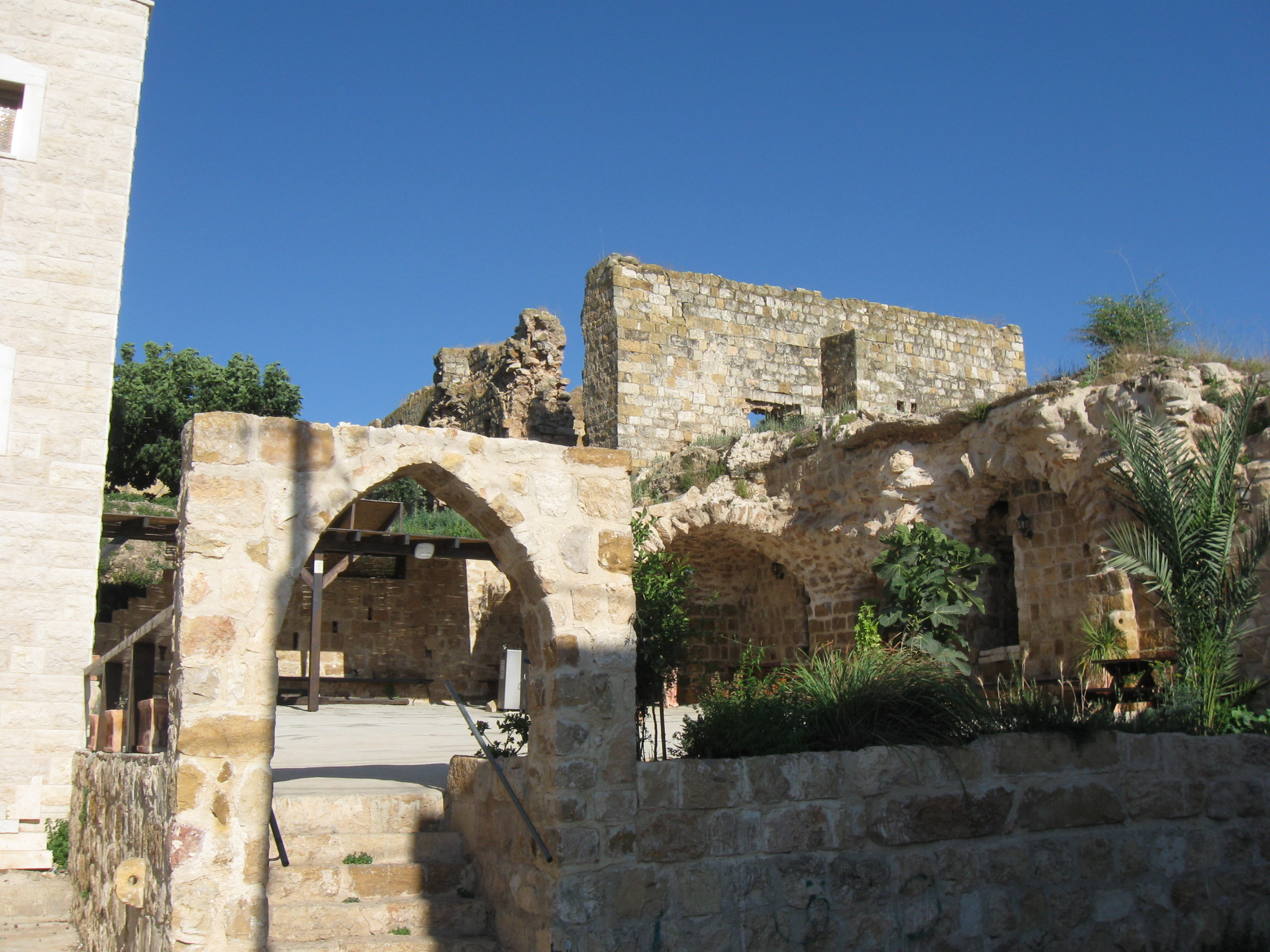
Remains of the palace complex at Deir Hanna built by Daher, his brother Sa'd or son Ali. Daher was headquartered in Deir Hanna before moving to Acre

Fortifications and other structures were built in the villages under Daher's control. According to Andrew Petersen, the "best example of a fortified village in the Galilee" is Deir Hanna, where the Zayadina built a double enclosure wall with towers, a palace complex and mosque. The Zaydani building works in Deir Hanna were severely damaged during Jazzar's siege. Considerable parts of the structures remain intact and up to 1960, the town retained the form of the fortress, with no structures built beyond its original lines. The 18th-century fortress at Jiddin, built on the foundations of a Crusader castle, similarly features a double enclosure wall with round towers and gun slits.

Daher's son Ali refortified the Crusader-era citadel of Safed, while Daher or his son Ahmad restored the Crusader tower at Saffuriya. In Shefa-Amr, Daher's uncle Ali and son Uthman built its large fortress with four towers, of which one remains standing, and mosque. In nearby I'billin, Daher's brother Yusuf built fortifications and a mosque. South of Shefa-Amr, Daher fortified Harbaj, though both the village and its fort were in ruins by the late 19th century. At Tabgha on the Sea of Galilee, Daher constructed five fountains, one of which remained in use in the mid-19th century and was the largest of its kind in the Galilee. (Note: Daher is credited in the Survey of Western Palestine for rebuilding the Crusader castle of Tibnin and founding the Qal'at Marun castle at Deir Kifa (both in modern Lebanon). Amnon Cohen credits Tibnin's reconstruction to the Metawali sheikh Nasif al-Nassar, whose family long controlled the site.)

== Administration ==
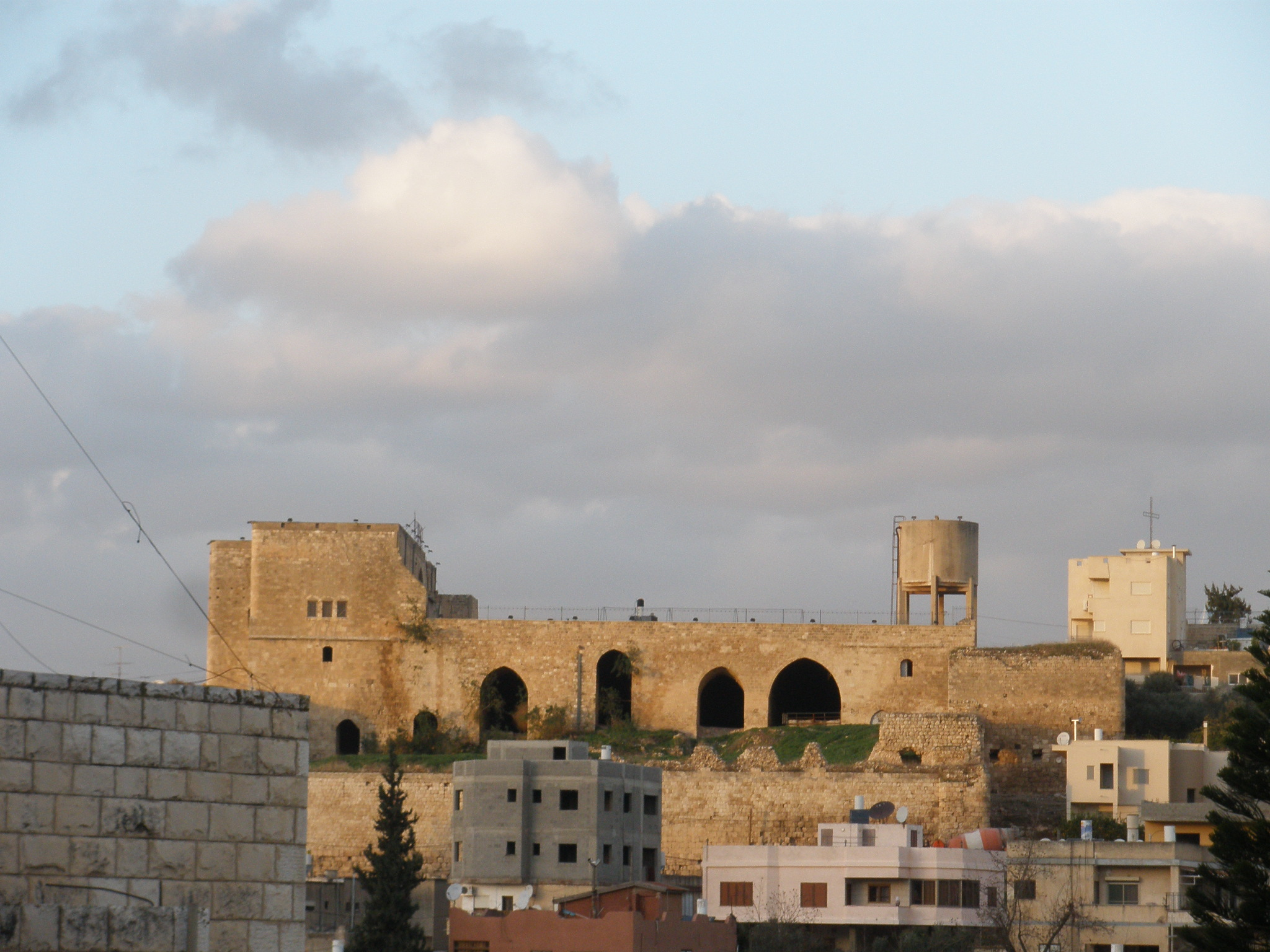
The fortress of Shefa-Amr, built by Daher's son Uthman

Overseeing Daher's fiscal affairs and correspondences was his mudabbir (manager) and vizier. This official was always a Melkite Christian, the first of whom was Yusuf al-Arqash. He was succeeded in 1749 by Yusuf Qassis, who served until 1761 when he was arrested for attempting to smuggle his wealth to Malta. Qassis was succeeded by Ibrahim al-Sabbagh, Daher's personal physician from 1757, who became the most influential figure in Daher's administration. Sabbagh derived his substantial wealth and influence from managing Daher's cotton monopoly. He took on additional roles as Daher's political adviser, chief administrator and chief representative with European merchants and Ottoman provincial and imperial officials. Daher appointed an agha (military official) to supervise customs by the European merchants in Acre and Haifa.

The chief religious officials in Daher's administration were the mufti and the qadi (judge). The mufti was the chief scholar among the ulema (Muslim scholarly community) and interpreted Islamic law in Daher's realm. Although the mufti was a government appointee, Daher kept the same mufti for many years, in contrast with the typical Syrian province where the mufti was replaced annually. The longtime mufti was Daher's family friend from Damascus, Abd al-Halim al-Shuwayki. The qadi was directly appointed by Daher from Palestine's local ulema, but his judicial decisions had to be approved by the qadi of Sidon. Daher also had a chief imam, who in the last years of his rule was Ali ibn Khalid from Sha'ab.

There is little information about Daher's administration beyond his court in Acre. A 1774 French consular record mentions village sheikhs or administrators, assumably responsible for transporting cotton from the countryside to Acre. Daher kept local leaders in place as proxies, underwriting their iltizam. The subordinate multazims included the Metawali sheikhs, the Husayn family of Jiddin, and the Nafi, Shahin and Murad families in the Safed area. Satisfied with their military support and exporting their cotton, Daher left the Metawalis to self govern. In the Galilee, Daher married his sons into the local ruling families and set them up in strategic fortresses to safeguard his interests, keep his proxies in check, and defend his territory from external attack. Except for Acre and Haifa, Daher divided the remainder of his territory between family members.

=== Military ===
Daher's initial forces consisted of 200 Zaydani horsemen under the command of his cousin Muhammad al-Ali and the Bedouin levies of the Saqr. The latter, though highly mobile and inexpensive to recruit, were unruly and given to plunder. Daher's suppression of the Bedouin caused the Saqr to largely withdraw their military backing. Relations between Daher and the Bedouin vacillated throughout his rule and, in times of need, he could count on at least some tribal support. As their territory grew, the Zayadina drew fighters among the peasants and townspeople of their domains. Those recruited by Daher's sons were fielded in Daher's service or against him in times of rebellion. By the 1740s, 1,500 such fighters could be mustered, this number increasing to around 5,000 cavalry by the 1760s. The local horsemen, sometimes referred to in contemporary sources as the Safadiyya ('people of Safed', i.e. the Galilee), considered Daher's prosperity and success linked to their own; it is unclear if any were salaried. Mobilized on an ad-hoc basis, such fighters were similarly the mainstay of Daher's local counterparts, the sheikhs of Jabal Nablus, the Druze, and the Metawalis.

Distinguishing Daher's private army from those of his counterparts was the permanent corps of Maghrebi mercenaries he recruited in the late 1730s. Numbering roughly 1,000 infantrymen under the command of Ahmad Agha al-Dinkizli, they constituted at least one-third of Daher's standing army. His standing army surpassed that of Sidon's governor and was on near-equal footing with the army of Damascus. While the forces mobilized by Damascus could significantly outnumber those of Daher, they were disparate and undisciplined and often put to flight by his smaller detachments. Daher's formal alliance with the Metawali sheikhs in 1768 augmented his military strength, enabling him to draw on the 5,000–6,000 horsemen at their disposal. The Metawali cavalry were noted for their battlefield prowess, but like Daher's other peasant levies, could only be fielded for short stints.

Daher and his relatives bolstered their military posture by building or rebuilding the walls and fortresses of Acre and the towns and villages of their domains. While Acre and Haifa were manned by Maghrebis, the garrisons of the other forts were drawn from locals, referred to in contemporary sources as asker-i Arab. The key fortresses were equipped with cannons and artillerymen. By the time of his death, Daher had nearly 100 cannons between Acre, Haifa and Sidon (as compared to the three cannons the governor of Sidon had at his disposal before Daher's occupation). His soldiers' arsenal included matchlock rifles, pistols and lances. Most of the firearms were imported from Venice or France and, by the early 1770s, the Russian navy. Daher lacked a naval strategy, occasionally raising a gun-fitted ship for specific missions.

== Assessment ==
Writing of Daher and his rule in 1787, Volney held

It [was] long since Syria has beheld among her chiefs so great a character. In military affairs, no man possessed more courage, activity, coolness or resources. In politics, the noble frankness of his mind was not diminished even by his ambition ... The reputation of his justice had established throughout his state, a security unknown in Turkey [the Ottoman Empire]. Differences in religion occasioned no disputes;

Volney attributed the collapse of Daher's rule to its unsystematic and disorganized nature, and the early concessions to his sons, which divided his troops, disrupted development and commerce, sapped his treasury and hastened his demise. Most acutely, Volney blamed Sabbagh's avarice for alienating Daher in his old age from his sons and allies and causing the populace to feel "indifferent" toward his rule during its last years.

In historian Amnon Cohen's view, until his final defeat, Daher had withstood a series of external challenges while expanding and considerably developing his domains, "an achievement equalled neither by his predecessors in Palestine nor by any other contemporary ruler of his status". Cohen considers Volney's assessment of Daher's administration "unfair", as he compared Daher's rule against contemporary European standards; relative to past administrations in Palestine or the Syrian provinces in general, Daher's "achievements were ... truly remarkable". Moreover, the success of Daher's rule was in large part due to its centralized character, the duration and scale of which had been unprecedented in the territory he governed. Cohen downplays the dissension among Daher's sons as squabbles, which, while conceivably disrupting growth and revenue, played no decisive role in his downfall. The sons recognized Daher as paramount chief of the Zayadina to the end and Daher's firm hold over this family structure allowed him to establish and oversee a highly efficient administration over his domains. Jazzar's costly and arduous struggle to eliminate the family's power in the Galilee in the aftermath of Daher's death testified to its deep rootedness.

Despite acting with great independence, Daher was careful to maintain relations with the imperial government, consistently professing his loyalty to the sultan. In the 1770s, his defiance escalated drastically through the alliance with Ali Bey and the Russians. While Ali Bey might have aimed for full independence from the Ottomans, Daher's motives were territorial expansion, control of Sidon and the ouster of his principal adversary, Uthman Pasha. Until his fall, he sought imperial pardon and recognition of his governorship of Sidon. In this respect, he shared the sentiment of his military chief Dinkizli on the sanctity of the sultan and differed from Sabbagh, who reckoned an imminent collapse of the empire. Crecelius attributes the "inability" of Daher and Ali Bey "to establish permanently autonomous regimes in the period of greatest Ottoman weakness" to "the skill of Ottoman statecraft and to the resilience of the Ottoman Empire in being able to obtain revenues and products from provinces over which it had had to relinquish military control" in the 18th century.

== Legacy ==
Jazzar maintained the cotton monopoly Daher established and the Galilee's economy remained dependent on the cotton trade. The region prospered for decades, but with the rise of cotton production in the southern United States during the early–mid-19th century, European demand shifted away from Palestine's cotton. Because of its dependence on the crop, the region experienced a sharp economic downturn from which it could not recover. Cotton was largely abandoned, as were many villages, and the peasantry shifted to subsistence agriculture.

In the late 19th century, the Palestine Exploration Fund's Claude Reignier Conder wrote that the Ottomans had successfully destroyed the power of Palestine's indigenous ruling families who "had practically been their own masters" but had been "ruined so that there is no longer any spirit left in them". Among these families were the "proud race" of Daher, which was still held in high esteem, but was powerless and poor. Daher's descendants live in Nazareth, Bi'ina and Kafr Manda and, before its 1948 destruction, Damun. Many of the inhabitants of northern Israel, particularly the towns and villages where Daher or his family left an architectural legacy, hold Daher in high regard.

Daher was largely overlooked by historians of the Middle East. He was gradually integrated into Palestinian historiography, with some scholars viewing his rule as a forerunner to Palestinian nationalism. In Palestinian cultural and academic circles, Daher is celebrated as a national hero who fought for his people's welfare against the Ottomans. Murad Mustafa Dabbagh's Biladuna Filastin (1965), a multi-volume work about Palestine's history, calls Daher the "greatest Palestinian appearing in the eighteenth century". Palestinian academic Nur Masalha described Daher as "the founding father of early Palestinian modernities and social renewal". He further argued that Palestine under the rule of Daher was "the closest Palestine got to a modern independent state". According to historian Ahmad Hasan Joudah, notwithstanding the lack of objectivity in some Palestinian re-interpretations of Daher and his legacy, "it is precise to say that ... [Daher] successfully established an autonomous state, or a 'little Kingdom', as Albert Hourani called it, in most of Palestine for over a quarter of a century".

== See also ==
- Fakhr al-Din II, tax farmer and local ruler of Mount Lebanon, the Galilee, and the adjacent coasts in the late 16th–early 17th centuries.
- Aqil Agha, semi-autonomous Bedouin leader of the Galilee in the mid-19th century
- Mohamed Hadid, Palestinian-American real estate developer descendant of Daher, and father of American models Gigi Hadid and Bella Hadid.

== Sources ==
- Baram, Uzi (2007). "Filling a Gap in the Chronology: What Archaeology is Revealing about the Ottoman Past in Israel". In Sufian, Sandra Marlene; Levine, Mark (eds.). Reapproaching Borders: New Perspectives on the Study of Israel–Palestine. Lanham, Maryland: Rowman & Littlefield. pp. 15–40. ISBN 978-0-7425-4639-4.
- Barnai, Jacob (1992). The Jews in Palestine in the Eighteenth Century: Under the Patronage of the Istanbul Committee of Officials for Palestine. Translated by Naomi Goldblum. Tuscaloosa, Alabama: University of Alabama Press. ISBN 978-0-8173-0572-7.
- Bshara, Khaldun (Spring 2017). "The Ottoman Saraya: All That Did Not Remain". Jerusalem Quarterly (69): 66–77. doi:10.70190/jq.I69.p66.
- Cohen, Amnon (1973). Palestine in the 18th Century: Patterns of Government and Administration. Jerusalem: The Magnes Press. ISBN 978-0-19-647903-3.
- Conder, C.R.; Kitchener, H. H. (1881). The Survey of Western Palestine: Memoirs of the Topography, Orography, Hydrography, and Archaeology. Vol. 1. London: Committee of the Palestine Exploration Fund.
- Crecelius, Daniel (1981). A Study of the Regimes of 'Ali Bey al-Kabir and Muhammad Bey Abu al-Dhahab, 1760-1775. Minneapolis and Chicago: Bibliotheca Islamica. ISBN 0-88297-029-1.
- Crecelius, Daniel (1986). "Egypt's Reawakening Interest in Palestine During the Regimes of Ali Bey al-Kabir and Muhammad Bey Abu al-Dahab: 1760–1775". In Kushner, David (ed.). Palestine in the Late Ottoman Period: Political, Social, and Economic Transformation. Leiden: Brill. pp. 247–262. ISBN 90-04-07792-8.
- Doumani, Beshara (1995). Rediscovering Palestine: Merchants and Peasants in Jabal Nablus. Berkeley, Los Angeles and London: University of California Press. ISBN 0-520-08895-6.
- Emmett, Chad F. (1995). Beyond the Basilica: Christians and Muslims in Nazareth. Chicago: University of Chicago Press. ISBN 978-0-226-20711-7.
- Haddad, George M. (1967). "The Chronicle of Abbud al-Sabbagh and the Fall of Daher al-Umar in Acre". Al-Abhath. 20: 37–44. doi:10.1163/2589997x-02002010.
- Joudah, Ahmad Hasan (2013) [1987]. Revolt in Palestine in the Eighteenth Century: The Era of Shaykh Zahir al-Umar (Second ed.). Piscataway, New Jersey: Gorgias Press. ISBN 978-1-4632-0002-2.
- Joudah, Ahmad (2015). "Zahir al-'Umar and the First Autonomous Regime in Ottoman Palestine (1744–1775)". Jerusalem Quarterly (63–64): 84–85. doi:10.70190/jq.I63.p72.
- Kanje, Fadel (2016). Transhumances interculturelles d'un Arabe de Nazareth [Intercultural Transhumance of an Arab from Nazareth] (in French). Paris: l'Hartmann. ISBN 978-2-343-10202-3.
- Khoury, D. R. (2008). "Political Relations between City and State in the Middle East, 1700–1850". In Sluglett, Peter (ed.). The Urban Social History of the Middle East, 1750–1950. Syracuse, New York: Syracuse University Press. pp. 67–103. ISBN 978-0-8156-5063-8.
- Masalha, Nur (2020). Palestine: A Four Thousand Year History (Paperback ed.). London: Zed Books. ISBN 978-1-78699-869-9.
- Nasrallah, Ibrahim (2014). The Lanterns of the King of Galilee. Cairo: The American University in Cairo Press. ISBN 978-977-416-666-2.
- Silberman, Neil Asher (1996). "Tobacco Pipes, Cotton Prices and Progress". In Orser, Charles E. (ed.). Images of the Recent Past: Readings in Historical Archaeology. Walnut Creek, California: Altamira Press. pp. 462–477. ISBN 978-0-7619-9142-7.
- Petersen, Andrew (2001). A Gazetteer of Buildings in Muslim Palestine, Part 1. Oxford: Oxford University Press. ISBN 978-0-19-727011-0.
- Philipp, Thomas (2001). Acre: The Rise and Fall of a Palestinian City, 1730–1831. New York: Columbia University Press. ISBN 978-0-231-50603-8.
- Pringle, Denys; Petersen, Andrew; Dow, Martin; Singer, Caroline (1994). "Qalʿat Jiddin: A Castle of the Crusader and Ottoman Periods in Galilee". Levant. 2: 135–166.
- Pringle, Denys (2009). The Churches of the Crusader Kingdom of Jerusalem: The Cities of Acre and Tyre with Addenda and Corrigenda to Volumes I–III. Cambridge: Cambridge University Press. ISBN 978-0-521-85148-0.
- Rafeq, Abdul-Karim (1966). The Province of Damascus, 1723–1783. Beirut: Khayats. OCLC 26512897.
- Reichmuth, Stefan (2009). The World of Murtada al-Zabidi (1732–91): Life, Networks and Writings. Oxford and Exeter: Gibb Memorial Trust. ISBN 978-0-906094-60-0.
- Shamir, Shimon (1963). "As'ad Pasha al-'Aẓm and Ottoman Rule in Damascus (1743–58)". Bulletin of the School of Oriental and African Studies. 26 (1): 1–28. doi:10.1017/S0041977X00074243. JSTOR 611304. S2CID 162913446.
- Sharon, Moshe (1997). Corpus Inscriptionum Arabicarum Palaestinae, A. Leiden and Boston: Brill. ISBN 978-90-04-10833-2.
- Sharon, Moshe (2004). Corpus Inscriptionum Arabicarum Palaestinae, D-F. Leiden and Boston: Brill. ISBN 978-90-04-13197-2.
- Schölch, Alexander (1984). "The Decline of Local Power in Palestine after 1856: The Case of ʿAqīl Aġā". Die Welt des Islams. New Series. 23 (1): 458–475. doi:10.2307/1570684. JSTOR 1570684.
- Lusignan, Sauveur (1783). "A History of the Revolt of Ali Bey, against the Ottoman Porte". The Critical Review, or Annal of Literature. 55: 278–282.
- Tabouni, Mufleh (11 October 2017). "ظاهر العمر يترجّل في جليله" [The Appearance of Glory in its Old Age is Dismounting]. Diwan Al Arab.
- Volney, C.-F. (1788). Travels Through Syria and Egypt, in the Years 1783, 1784, and 1785: Containing the Present Natural and Political State of Those Countries, Their Productions, Arts, Manufactures, and Commerce; with Observations on the Manners, Customs, and Government of the Turks and Arabs. London: G.G.J. and J. Robinson.
- Winter, Stefan (2010). The Shiites of Lebanon under Ottoman Rule, 1516–1788. Cambridge: Cambridge University Press. ISBN 978-1-139-48681-1.
- Yazbak, Mahmoud (1998). Haifa in the Late Ottoman Period, A Muslim Town in Transition, 1864–1914. Leiden, Boston and Koln: Brill. ISBN 978-90-04-11051-9.
- Yazbak, Mahmoud (2013). "The Politics of Trade and Power: Dahir al-Umar and the Making of Early Modern Palestine". Journal of the Economic and Social History of the Orient. 56 (4–5): 696–736. doi:10.1163/15685209-12341338. S2CID 154242949.

Preceded by Darwish Pasha al-Kurji	Wali of Sidon; 1771—1775 (de facto)	Succeeded by Ahmad Pasha al-Jazzar
