= Abd al-Halim al-Shuwayki =

Abd al-Halim ibn Abd al-Ghaffar al-Shuwayki (fl. 1740s–1775) was the mufti of Acre during its rule by the tax farmer and sheikh Daher al-Umar. He also distinguished himself as the teacher of Daher's children and the Christian elite of Acre.

== Life ==
The Shuwayki family was based in the Damascus suburb of Salihiyya, which was home to a significant population of Sunni Muslims adhering to the Hanbali school of Islamic law who were originally from Palestine (the Shuwayki family, in particular, was originally from the village of Shuwayka in the Nablus region of Palestine). By the 16th century, during Ottoman rule, the family had produced at least three Hanbali muftis (religious jurists) in Damascus.

Abd al-Halim's father, Abd al-Ghaffar, was a alim (religious scholar) and friend of the Zaydan family of Daher al-Umar, who had become the paramount sheikh (chief) and multazim (tax farmer) of the Galilee in the early 18th century. He visited the family in Tiberias, which they had gained control of in 1730, and hosted Daher and the Zaydans on their business trips to Damascus. Abd al-Ghaffar introduced Daher to his first wife, a Damascene woman.

When Daher took over the port of Acre and made it the headquarters of his territory, he appointed Abd al-Halim as mufti of Acre and all of Daher's domains. He was also made the teacher of Daher's sons, one of whom, Uthman, developed poetic skills as a result. Abd al-Halim also instructed the children of Acre's upstart Christian elite in Arabic grammar and syntax. Among his Christian pupils was Mikha'il al-Sabbagh, the son of Daher's vizier Ibrahim al-Sabbagh. Shuwayki held the post of mufti at least until the killing of Daher by imperial Ottoman forces in 1775. According to the historian Thomas Philipp, Shuwayki distiniguished himself as an educator, but like the other members of the Muslim religious elite in Daher's realm, he "held no political influence whatsoever".

== Bibliography ==
- Bakhit, Muhammad Adnan (1982). The Ottoman Province of Damascus in the Sixteenth Century. Librairie du Liban. ISBN 9780866853224.
- Philipp, T. (1992). The Syrian Land in the 18th and 19th Century: The Common and the Specific in the Historical Experience. Stuttgart: Franz Steiner. ISBN 3-515-05685-8.
- Philipp, T. (2001). Acre: The Rise and Fall of a Palestinian City, 1730–1831. Columbia University Press. ISBN 978-0-231-50603-8.
