= Seraya, Nazareth =

Seraya
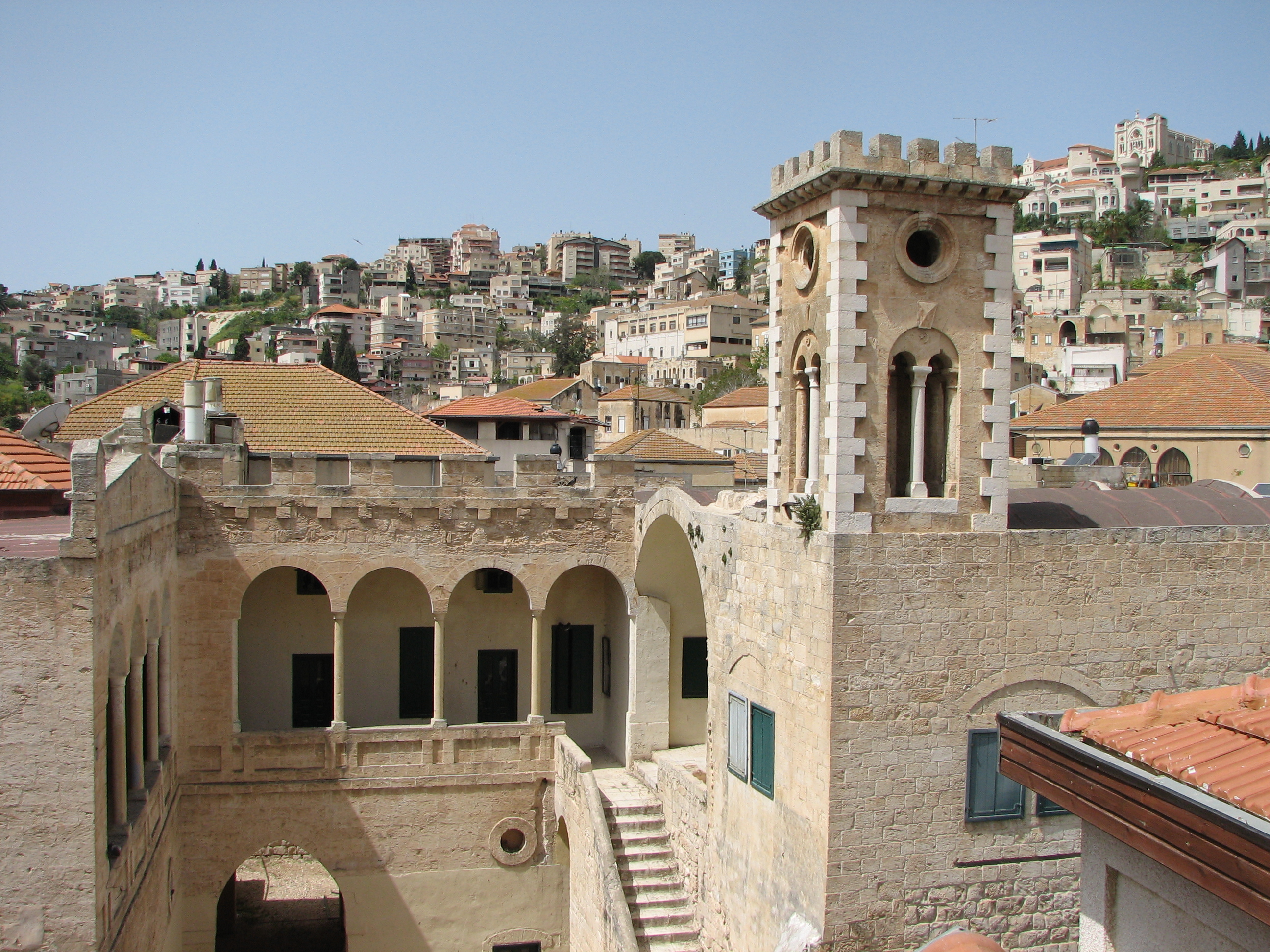
- General view of the Seraya, 2010

- Location within Israel

General information
- Status: Vacant
- Type: Government Palace
- Architectural style: Ottoman, neoclassical
- Location: Nazareth, Israel
- Coordinates: 32°42′13.77″N 35°17′54.3012″E
- Completed: 1740
- Owner: Nazareth Municipal Council

Design and construction
- Known for: Headquarters of Nazareth City Council (1877-1991); Residence of Nazareth Governor (1740-1877); Summer Residence of Daher al-Umar

The Seraya (also spelled Saraya) is a historical building in Nazareth, Israel. It was built around 1740 (or 1730) by the autonomous Arab ruler of the Galilee, Daher al-Umar, during the Ottoman era in Palestine. Daher, who later based himself in Acre, used it as a summer home. The Seraya served other functions, namely that of a governmental headquarters for Nazareth, which was an important town in the area and protected the routes and agricultural lands of the Jezreel Valley. The Seraya contained a stable for horses and a jail. Moreover, because of the absence of mosques in Nazareth at the time of the Seraya's construction, Daher designated a prayer room to substitute for a mosque to serve the town's Muslim residents. It continued in this capacity until the nearby White Mosque was completed in 1812.

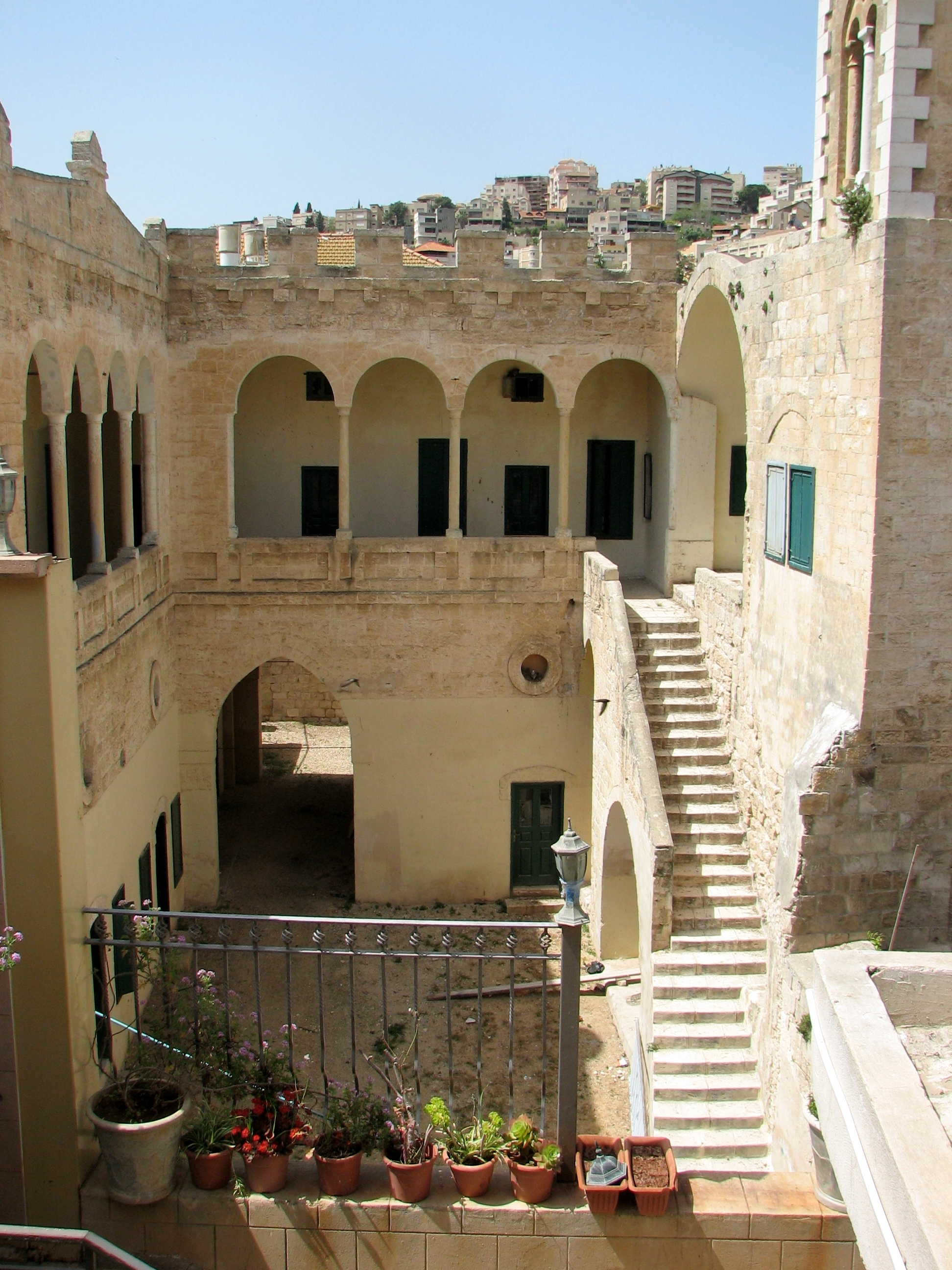
Courtyard, lower and upper floors

In 1857, a portico was built for the Seraya, amid other renovations. Later, in the early 20th century, a watchtower, built in the European Renaissance style, was added to the building. With the establishment of the Nazareth Municipal Council in 1877, the Seraya served as the council's headquarters until 1991. Prior to that it served as the residence of the local governor of Nazareth and its subdistrict. It is currently in disuse, but the city plans to turn the Seraya into a museum.
