= Stefan Reichmuth (academic) =

German scholar of Islam

Stefan Reichmuth (born 1950) is a German scholar of Islam. He was Professor at the Institute for Oriental and Islamic Studies at the Department of Philology, Ruhr University Bochum.

== Life ==
As a PhD student in the early 1980s, Reichmuth translated modern novels by Salah Abd as-Sabur and Tayyib Salih. He married a doctor, Gisela Reichmuth.

He started his academic career researching the Arab dialects of the Shukriyya in Sudan. Himself a Christian, he approached Islam from the perspective of humanism. His second major research project was the study of modern Islam in Nigeria for which he undertook sustained fieldwork and learnt several African languages. There he became interested in social network analysis, and studied the Ansar-Ud Deen Society. His "2009 masterpiece" reconstructed the life, works and networks of Murtada al-Zabidi, an 18th-century Indian scholar who studied in Yemen and settled in Cairo.

Reichmuth encouraged younger scholars at Bochum University, and established a research group Islamic Networks of Education in Local and Transnational Contexts. He contributed to the Enzyklopaedie der Neuzeit, and was chief editor of Die Welt des Islams from 2002 to 2016.

== Works ==
- Der arabische Dialekt der Šukriyya im Ostsudan. Hildesheim: G. Olms, 1983.
- The world of Murtada al-Zabidi (1732-91) : life, networks and writings. Cambridge: Gibb Memorial Trust, 2009.
- (ed. with Michael Kemper, Raoul Motika) Islamic Education in the Soviet Union and Its Successor States. Hoboken: Taylor & Francis, 2009.
- (ed. with Jörn Rüsen, Aladdin Sarhan) Humanism and Muslim culture : historical heritage and contemporary challenges. Göttingen, Taipei: V&R unipress GmbH, 2012.
- (ed. with Björn Bentlage, Marion Eggert, Hans Martin Krämer) Religious dynamics under the impact of imperialism and colonialism : a sourcebook. Leiden: Brill, 2017.
- (ed. with Denis Gril, Dilek Sarmis) The Presence of the Prophet in Early Modern and Contemporary Islam : Volume 1, The Prophet Between Doctrine, Literature and Arts: Historical Legacies and Their Unfolding. Leiden: Brill, 2021.
