= Daher (disambiguation) =

Daher, or DAHER, is a French industrial conglomerate.

Daher may also refer to:

== Places ==
- Daher, Egypt, or alternatively El Zaher, a district in Cairo, Egypt
- Daher (Kuwait), a district in Al Ahmadi Governorate, Kuwait
- Hospital Daher, a hospital in Brasília, Brazil
- Mazraat el Daher, a village located on Mount Lebanon, Lebanon

== People ==
- Daher al-Umar, 18th-century Arab strongman of northern Palestine. His sons:
  - Ahmad al-Daher
  - Ali al-Daher
  - Salibi al-Daher
- Ahmed A-Dahar, a Palestinian member of the Knesset.
- Anita Daher, Canadian writer of juvenile and teen books
- Eduard Daher, current Melkite Greek Catholic Archbishop of the Melkite Greek Catholic Archeparchy of Tripoli.
- Hassan Daher, a former professional footballer in Lebanon.
- Hussein Daher, a former professional footballer in Lebanon.
- Ignatius Michael IV Daher (1761–1816), Patriarch of the Syriac Catholic Church from 1801 to 1810
- José Zalaquett Daher (born 1942), Chilean lawyer, and human rights activist during the General Augusto Pinochet regime
- Kassem Daher, Lebanese-Canadian accused of membership in a number of Islamic militant groups
- Michel Daher, Lebanese entrepreneur and politician. Member of Lebanese Parliament. Founder of Daher Foods
- Nínawa Daher (1979–2011), Argentine lawyer and journalist of Lebanese descent
- Pierre Daher, Hungarian physician and politician of Lebanese descent, member of the Hungarian National Assembly
- Pierre El Daher, Lebanese businessman, who has been the chairman and CEO of the Lebanese Broadcasting Corporation
- Ray Daher, Lebanese rugby league player
- Salam Daher, Lebanese civil defense worker who became the focus of controversy in the aftermath of the Israeli airstrike on Qana
- Sami Daher, a Lebanese actor.
- Thaísa Daher de Menezes, Brazilian two-time Olympic gold volleyball player

== See also ==
- SOCATA, also known as DAHER-SOCATA, formerly EADS Socata, producer of general aviation aircraft
