= Deir Hanna =

Deir Hanna: דֵיר חַנָּא; دير حنا
- Local council (from 1975)

Hebrew transcription(s)
  - ISO 259: Deir Ḥannaˀ
  - Also spelled: Deir Hana (official); Dayr Hanna (unofficial)
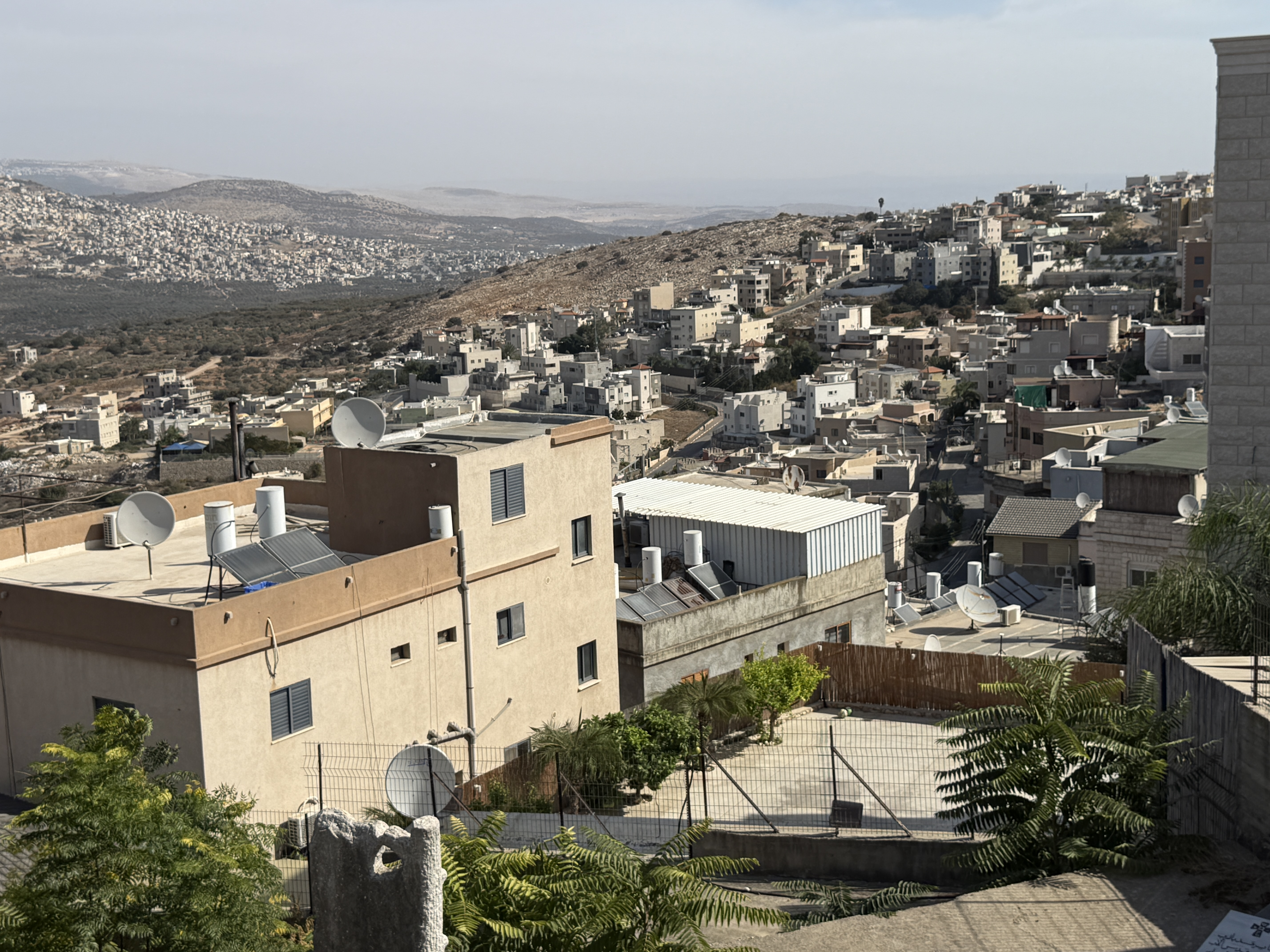
- Skyline of Deir Hanna, 2025

- Location within Northeast Israel Location within Israel
- Coordinates: 32°51′45″N 35°22′16″E
- Country: Israel
- District: Northern
- Subdistrict: Acre
- Natural Region: Shefar'am

Government
  - Head of Municipality: Saied Hussein

Area
  - Total: 7,500 dunams (7.5 km^{2}; 2.9 sq mi)

Population (2024)
  - Total: 10,762
  - Density: 1,400/km^{2} (3,700/sq mi)

Ethnicity
  - Arabs: 99.9%
  - Jews and others: 0.1%
- Name meaning: The Convent of St. John

Deir Hanna (Arabic: دير حنا, Hebrew: דֵיר חַנָּא) is an Arab town and local council in the Northern District of Israel, located on the hills of the Lower Galilee, 23 kilometres (14 mi) southeast of Acre. In 2024, it had a population of 10,762. Approximately 90% of Deir Hanna's inhabitants are Muslims and the remaining 10% are Christians.

The village may have been a center of rabbinic Judaism in the 1st century and in the 12th–13th centuries, was mentioned as a village of a Crusader fief. In the 18th century, during Ottoman rule, Deir Hanna became the rural stronghold of the Zayadina, a local family of strongmen and tax farmers led by Sheikh Daher al-Umar which controlled northern Palestine. Daher's brother Sa'd al-Umar built a fine mosque and substantially fortified Deir Hanna when he controlled it in the 1730s–1761 and further additions were successively made by Daher and his son Ali. The fortifications spanned an outer enclosure topped by twelve towers, an inner enclosure and two detached outer towers. The Zayadina lost control of the fortress village after a lengthy siege by Ahmad Pasha al-Jazzar on 22 July 1776, sealing the end of the family's roughly century-long power.

The fortress was largely destroyed but Deir Hanna was mentioned again in European travelogues throughout the 19th century as a religiously mixed village of Muslims and Greek Orthodox Christians living within the fortress remains.

== Etymology ==
In Arabic, "Deir" is a convent or monastery. "Deir Hanna" means “the Convent of St. John”.

== Geography ==
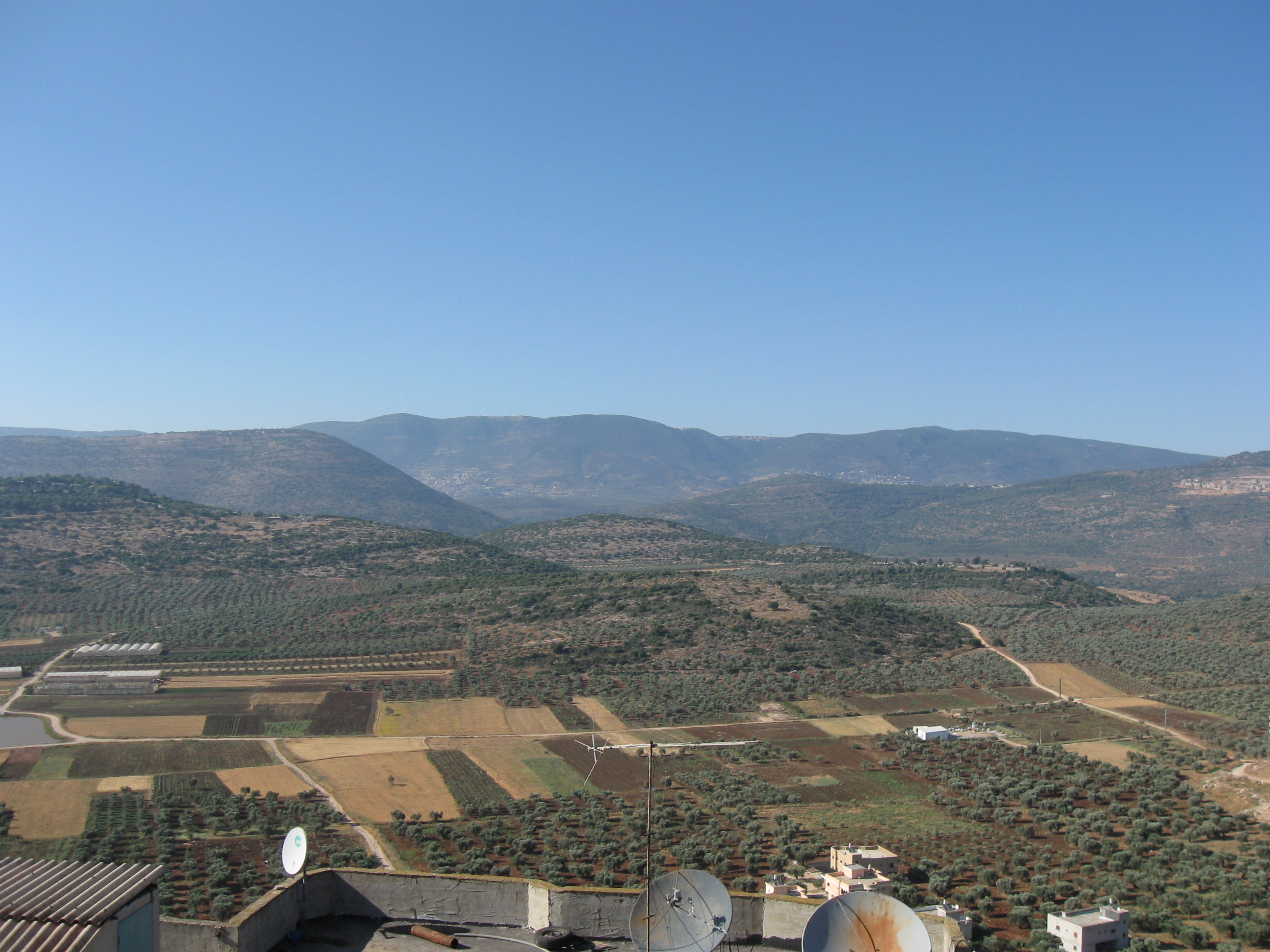
View of the Battuf plain and hills of Upper Galilee from Deir Hanna

Deir Hanna is located in the heart of the Galilee roughly at the midpoint between the Mediterranean and the Sea of Galilee. The old village surmounts a ridge about 300 meters (980 ft) above sea level. It sits on the southern edge of the fertile Battuf plain, which separates the hills of Upper and Lower Galilee.

== History ==
Some scholars identify Deir Hanna with the ancient Jewish town of Kfar Yochana (Hebrew: כפר יוחנא; alternatively spelled as Kfar Yohanan, Kfar Hanun, Kfar Hanina, Kfar Hana, Kfar Hanan, Kfar Hanin). The town held significance as a center of rabbinic learning, being the home of numerous sages. Kfar Yochana was the seat of Jachin, a priestly family, following the destruction of the Temple in 70 AD.

=== Crusader period ===
In the Crusader era, Deir Hanna was a fief known as Berhenne, or Der Henne. In 1174, it was one of the casalia (villages) given to Phillipe le Rous. In 1236, descendants of Phillipe le Rous confirmed the sale of the fief of Deir Henna. According to architectural researcher Andrew Petersen, no traces of Crusader occupation were found in the village.

=== Ottoman period ===
==== Zaydani period ====
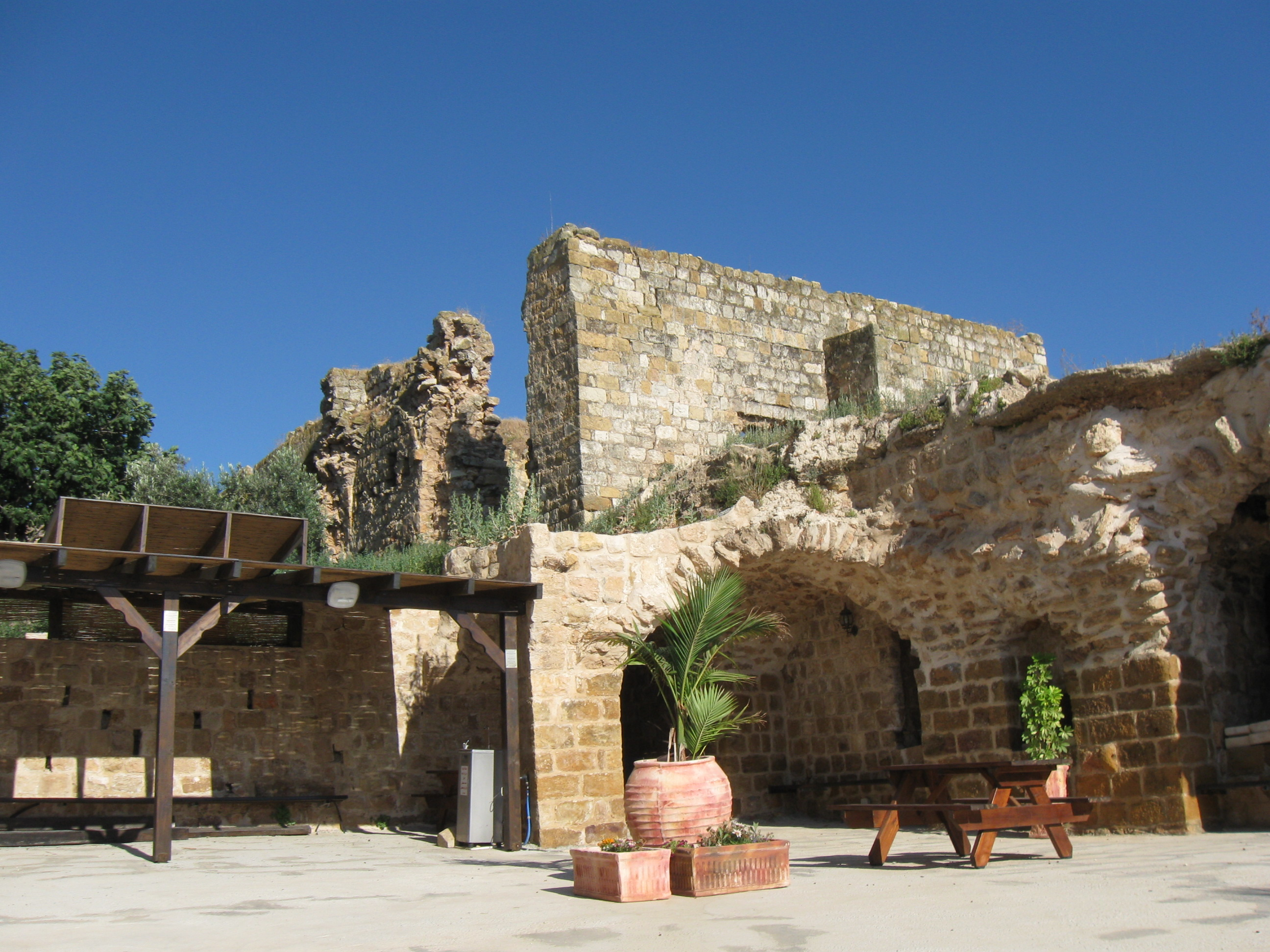
Remains of the old village

Deir Hanna became a base for the Zaydani family in the 18th century, and thus its importance grew with Daher al-Umar's rise to power during that time. Daher gave his eldest brother, Sa'd al-Umar, control of the village and nearby Arraba. An imperial firman ordered the governor of Damascus, Sulayman Pasha al-Azm, to raze Deir Hanna, but the order was not executed. Daher was headquartered in Tiberias and during the sieges of Tiberias (1742–1743) by Sulayman Pasha, Deir Hanna was used to smuggle in arms and provisions to Daher and Sa'd used it as a base to harry the besiegers. Sulayman Pasha thus launched an assault on Sa'd at Deir Hanna, but died suddenly, after which Zaydani forces overtook the governor's camp.

In the few years before he took up residence in the port town of Acre as his new headquarters in 1750, Daher used Deir Hanna as his principal base of operations. Sa'd commissioned the construction of most of Deir Hanna's fortifications, including its high inner enclosure walls, which at the time had 12 towers, and in 1732-33, its mosque. The mosque, before its destruction in 1776, had been the "most famous of all the Zaydānī's buildings in the Galilee", according to historian Moshe Sharon. Local tradition claims that the mosque was built on top of an older Crusader-era church and that Jazzar Pasha had been so impressed by Sa'd's mosque, that he copied its design for his namesake mosque in Acre. Deir Hanna was mentioned as a "castle" by Richard Pococke during his visit to the area in 1737.

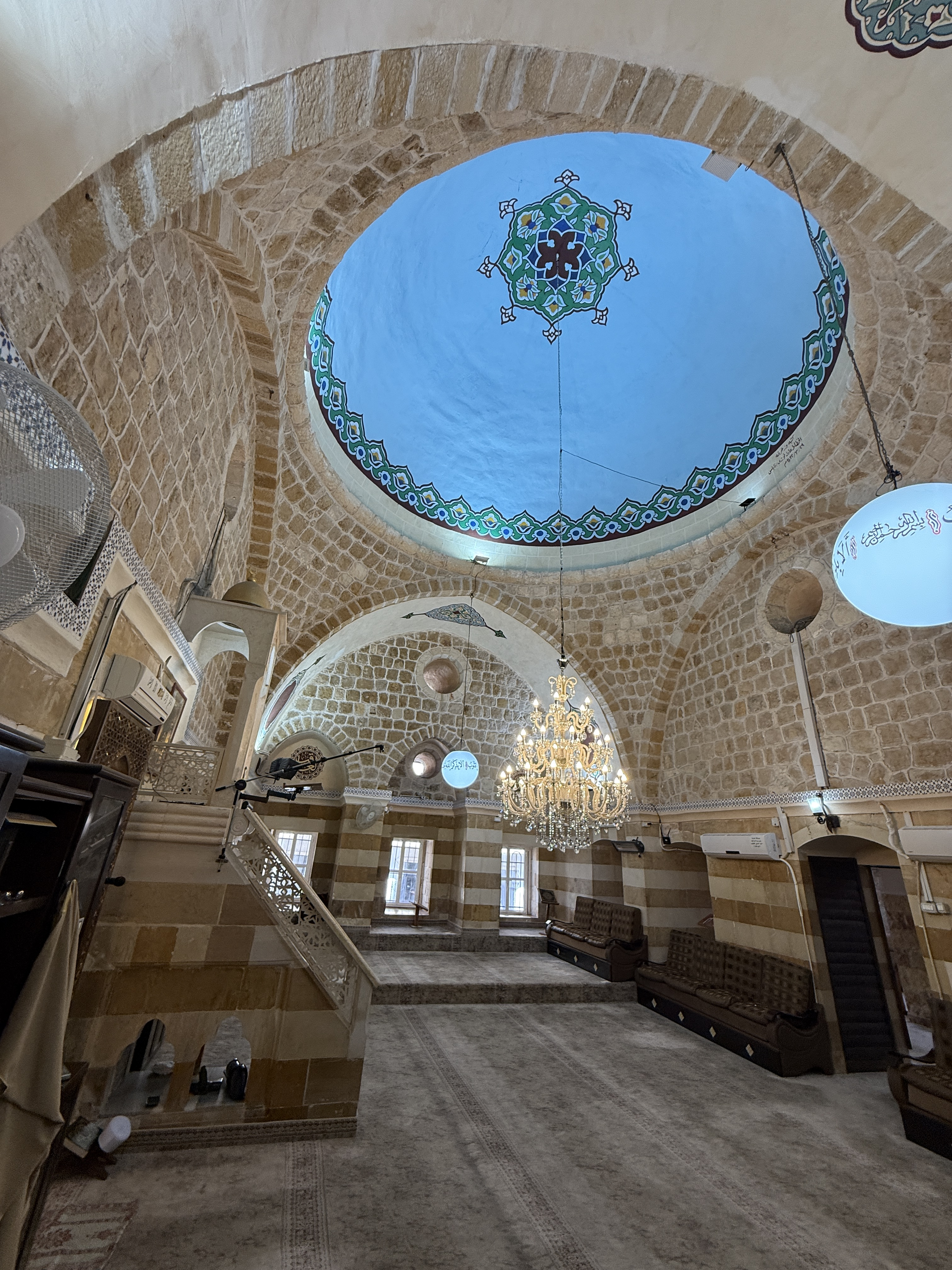
The mosque built by Sa'd al-Umar

Sa'd died in 1761 and the village became singularly controlled by Daher, who is credited with the construction of Deir Hanna's outer walls. In September 1767, Daher's son Ali requested control of the village, but Daher refused due to its high strategic importance, leading Ali to launch a rebellion against his father. At the time, Daher deputized control of Deir Hanna to another of his sons, Ahmad. Ali, now allied with his brother Salibi of Tiberias, drove Ahmad out and took over the fortress. In October, Daher put Ali to flight, but the latter left his wife and children in Deir Hanna to draw the sympathies of his father; Daher afterward agreed to cede control of the village for 12,500 piasters and 25 quality horses. Ali added two towers, each respectively located on the eastern and western sides of the fort. Both towers were detached from the fortress and were intended as additional protection in the event of a siege.

Following Daher's defeat and killing by an imperial Ottoman force in 1775, the government appointed Ahmad Pasha al-Jazzar as governor of Sidon and Jazzar used Daher's capital Acre as his headquarters. His first priority was subduing the Zaydani family which remained in control of Acre's Galilee countryside. Ali was the chief rebel against Jazzar among Daher's sons. After a series of battlefield defeats at Amqa, Majd al-Krum and Rameh, Ali staged a last stand against Jazzar at Deir Hanna. With 3,000, 5,000 or 12,000 soldiers (according to different estimates) and heavy guns, Jazzar besieged Deir Hanna in mid-1776. Ali soon after departed to gather more forces from his other base in Safed, leaving Deir Hanna under the command of his brother Sa'id. The latter, having failed to prevent Jazzar from reaching the village, also left for Safed. During the siege, Jazzar sowed divisions within Zaydani family ranks, having Ali's brother Uthman and his Bedouin supporters join in the siege, and offering safe conduct to Ahmad and Sa'id; five of Daher's sons were reported to have surrendered to Hasan Pasha al-Jaza'iri, the Ottoman navy captain at Acre, in July 1776.

Ali refused to capitulate and while the two outer towers of Deir Hanna were captured by Jazzar and reinforcements were blocked, the Zaydani garrison held out against Jazzar's troops for weeks. The garrison included Sa'id, Muhammad Abu Ghurrah (commander of the fortress and Daher's former deputy over Jaffa), Ali's kethuda (chief aide) Yusuf Dabbur (commander of the citadel), and Ali's son Fadil. A contemporary chronicler, Sa'id Effendi, noted the challenge posed by Deir Hanna: "It is not possible to describe (the extent) of the fortification (works) or the strength of the citadel". The stalemate was broken in late July when Hasan Pasha deployed a heavy cannon and 200 troops to support Jazzar. Cannon fire heavily damaged Deir Hanna's walls, prompting Ali to dispatch the qadi of Safed, Isma'il Effendi (Isma'il Ibn Abd al-Qadir al-Safadi), to negotiate peace with Jazzar on his behalf. Jazzar refused, insisting on direct negotiations, and the shelling of Deir Hanna resumed. Dabbur bypassed Ali and obtained promises of clemency from Jazzar for himself and his men and safe passage for their women and children, in return for surrendering the fortress and their weapons. On 22 July, the gates were opened to Jazzar, though he reneged and imprisoned the commanders. Deir Hanna was afterward razed by Jazzar's order.

==== 19th century ====
Local peasants re-inhabited Deir Hanna sometime after Jezzar's assault, but the village did not recover its prominence and no longer posed a threat to Ottoman authority. In 1838, Deir Hanna was noted as a Christian and Muslim village in the Shaghur district, located between Safed, Acre and Tiberias. In 1875 Victor Guérin found 40 Muslim and four Greek Orthodox Christian families living in Deir Hanna. In 1881, the Palestine Exploration Fund's Survey of Western Palestine (SWP) described the village and the building works of the Zaydani period as: "High walls all around the village, which is built of stone. The walls have round towers ... It is situated on the top of a high ridge, and contains about 400 Christians. It is surrounded by olive-groves and arable land. Water is obtained from cisterns and an old paved birkeh [pool] to the north of the village." A population list from about 1887 showed that Deir Hanna had about 365 inhabitants; 280 Muslims and 85 Catholic Christians.

=== British Mandate ===
In the 1922 census of Palestine conducted by the British Mandate authorities, Deir Hanna had a population of 429; 320 Muslims and 109 Christians, where all the Christians were Orthodox. By the 1931 census the population had increased to 563; 427 Muslims and 136 Christians, in a total of 117 houses.

In the 1945 statistics, its population was estimated by 750 Arab inhabitants; 540 Muslims and 210 Christians, with a total land area of 15,350 dunams. Of this, 2,799 dunams were plantations and irrigable land, 5,242 used for cereals, while 38 dunams were built-up.

=== Israel ===
During Operation Hiram, 29–31 October 1948, the town surrendered to the advancing Israeli army. Many of the inhabitants fled north but some stayed and were not expelled by the Israeli soldiers. Deir Hanna remained under Martial Law until 1966.

Deir Hanna forms the Land Day triangle with Sakhnin and Arraba. The town has been through a thorough modernization process, and now has a full education system, health care facilities and sports playgrounds.

== Demographics ==
Historical population
Year	Pop.	±%
1972	2,800	—
1983	4,400	+57.1%
1995	6,300	+43.2%
2008	8,700	+38.1%
2022	10,283	+18.2%
2024	10,762	+4.7%

== Historical buildings and structures ==
The old village forms a square block and within it are nearly all of Deir Hanna's 18th-century structures. These include the fortifications, palace, mosque, as well as many smaller structures and the 19th-century church.

Edwards et al compared Deir Hanna to the throne villages of the central Palestinian highlands, the rural seats of local sheikhs which incorporated elements of urban architecture. They noted Deir Hanna in many respects exceeded the throne villages by the sophistication of its architecture, which may have been inspired by that of the Zayadina's urban contemporaries, the Azm family of governors in Damascus. In particular they noted the traditional urban Islamic arrangement of the palace-mosque-fortress complex, like that of the Azm Palace-Umayyad Mosque. This was a reflection of both the Zayadina's great wealth and the special status they conferred on Deir Hanna and its immediate environs, on whose inhabitants the Zayadina most relied to maintain their power.

=== Fortifications ===
According to archaeologist Andrew Petersen, Deir Hanna "is the best example of a fortified village in [the] Galilee". Of the original twelve towers built by the Zayadina, the remains of four, along with many sections of the walls, were discernible in the 1992 survey of the site (five towers had been discernible in the 1920 survey). Substantial sections of the fortifications remain and the village remained delimited by the perimeter of the original fortress until at least 1960, with no residences built outside of it.

Each of the surviving towers is located along the ridges of the hill on which the old village sits and only one was attached to the wall fortifications (near the palace); the other three stood alone. The bottom of the palace-side tower, up to the first 6 meters (20 ft), is well preserved but the top is collapsed. It has a semi-circular structure. The next closest tower is 500 meters (1,600 ft) to the west and round-shaped. The most westerly surviving tower is another 500 meters (1,600 ft) away. These last two towers are likely the outer towers built by Ali. About 700 meters (2,300 ft) from the mosque is the fourth surviving tower. The towers were roughly 8 meters (26 ft) in diameter. The extant walls run along the north and south sides of the old village.

=== Palace ===
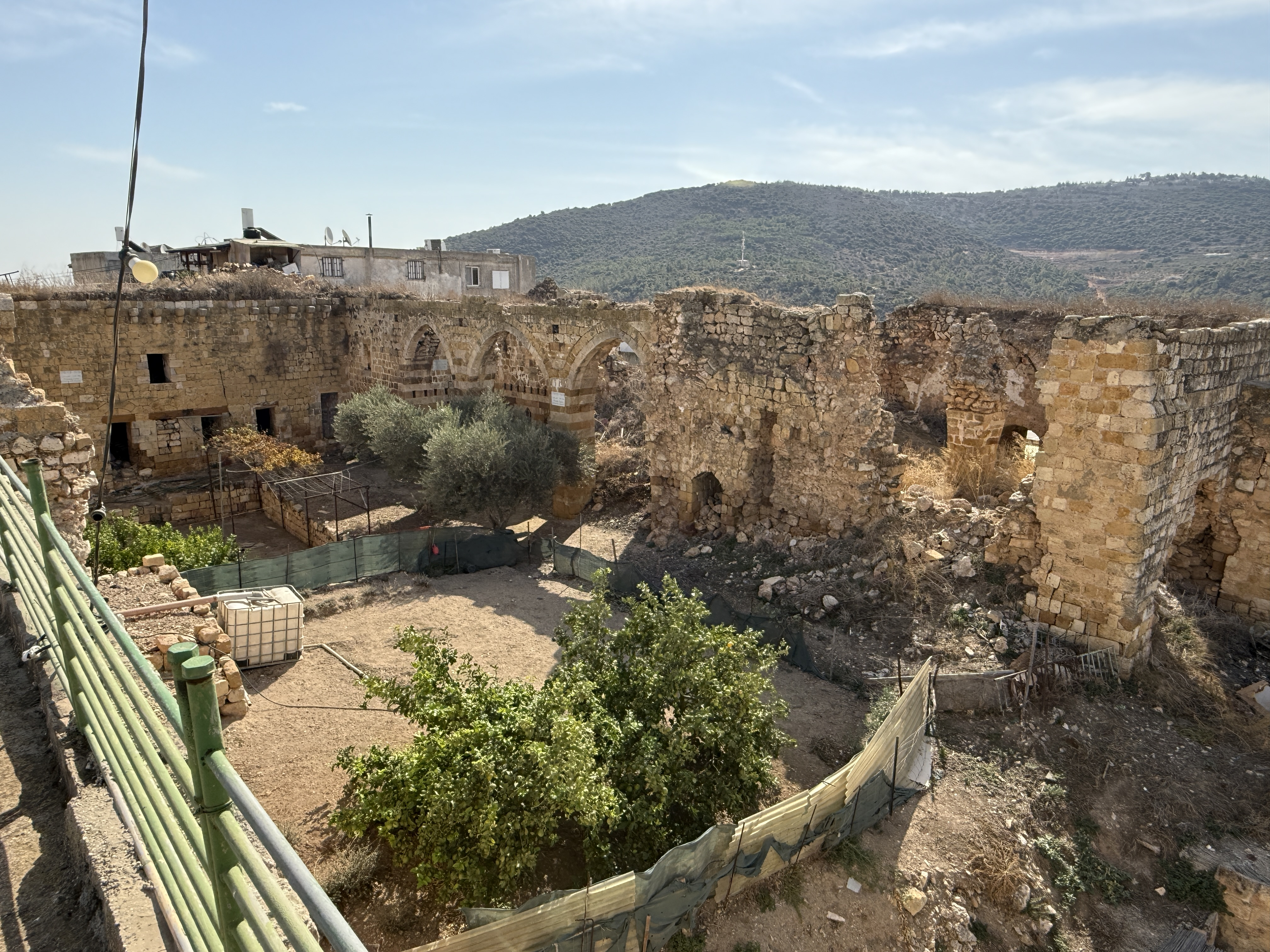
Remains of the Zaydani palace, including the yellow and white ablaq arcade along the south wall, 2025

The Zaydani palace on the south end of the old village is partly ruined. Measuring 60 by 40 meters (200 ft × 130 ft), it consisted of two stories with a fortified roof, the ground floor used for arms storage and the upper serving as the main residence. The residence was an arcade of high arches and had a staircase leading up to the roof. Built in the Levantine style, it had a central rectangular courtyard (15 square meters (160 ft^{2})) and central liwan bordered by eight to twelve chambers of varying sizes on raised and roofed terraces.

The walls enclosing the palace were built of dolomite blocks in ablaq (alternating) masonry of yellow ochre and cream-colored stones. The entryway to the palace, now in ruins, was on the north side of the courtyard, and built into a high wall with a row of corbels. The south end of the courtyard consists of a facade of three pointed arches, the middle broader than its flanks, built of white and ochre ablaq masonry. Other openings along this wall included a lobed-arched niche and a round arched doorway hooded by joggled voussoirs.

=== Mosque ===
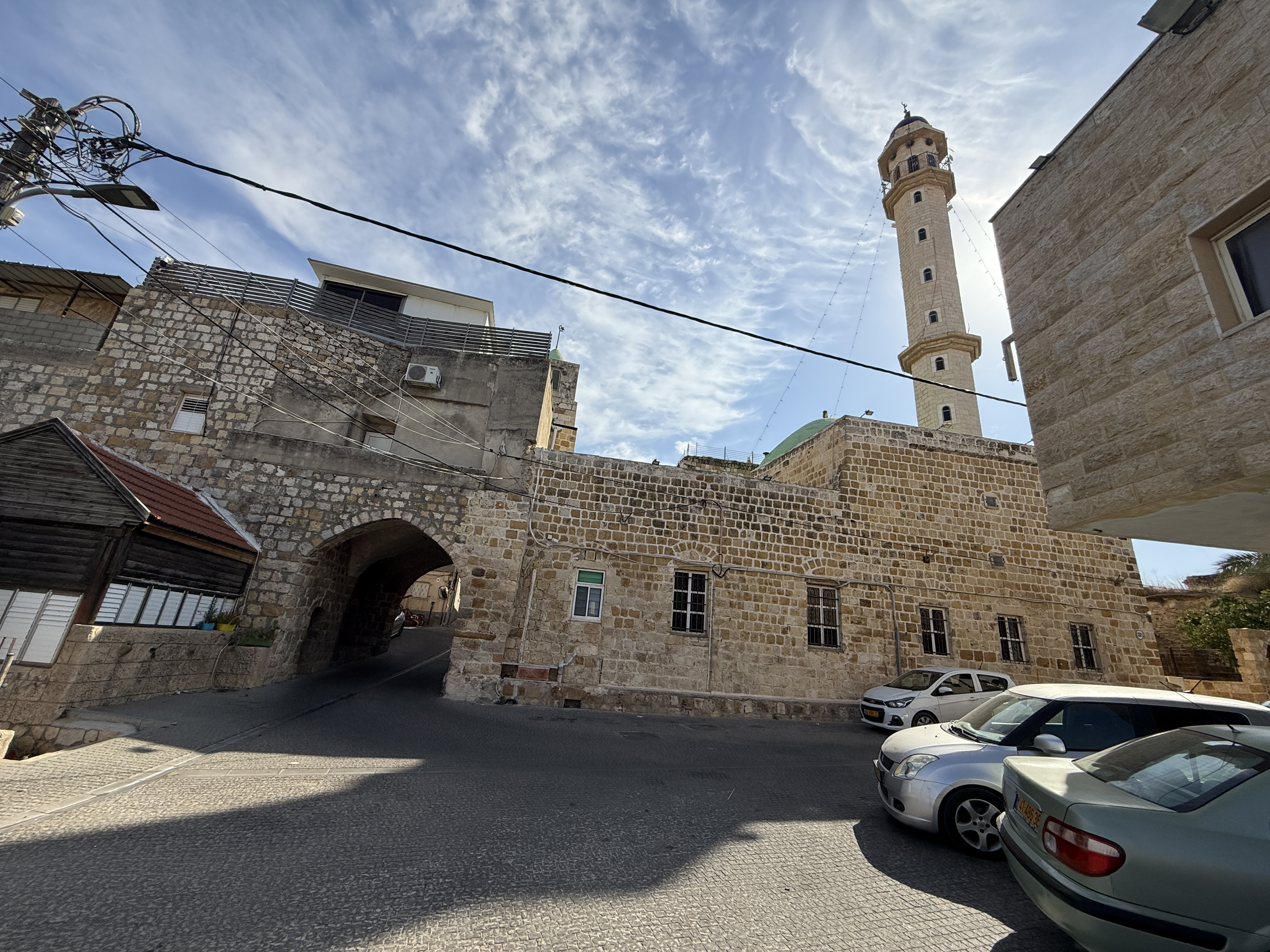
The Zaydani mosque of Deir Hanna

The Zaydani mosque in Deir Hanna was built in the classic Ottoman style, reminiscent of the Ibrahim Pasha Mosque of Istanbul and the Sokullu Mehmet Pasha Mosque of Luleburgaz. The only mosques resembling it in historical Palestine are those in Tiberias, especially the Zahiri Mosque built by Daher al-Umar, and the Jazzar Mosque of Acre (though the lesser known mosques of the depopulated Palestinian villages of Amqa and al-Ghabisiyya also bear resemblance). It consists of a rectangular portico leading into a domed central room bounded by large, broad arches each with three windows. A distinction from the classic Ottoman style is the lack of a dome over the portico, which is instead a broad arch with two folded cross vaults connecting it to the central room. A dedicatory inscription crediting Sa'd al-Umar as the builder and defining his waqf (endowment) was removed by Ahmad Pasha al-Jazzar in 1776.

According to Edwards et al., "The most striking feature" is the Mamluk-style concave mihrab (prayer niche). Its inlay comprises four horizontal segments and inlaid by marble ablaq (alternating) panels. The bottom segment is decorated by five long, red triangles with a tulip shape at the points against a white backdrop; the next section are diagonal red lines against a white backdrop; above it is yellow ochre marble; the top segment has five rectangular panels with cusped finials, eight-pointed stars with flower motifs, square Kufic designs, topped by a yellow ochre band. The hood of the mihrab is five white and yellow ablaq panels bordered by red and black triangles. The minaret of the mosque was likely not constructed by the Zayadina and was a later addition; prior to its construction, the adhan (call to prayer) was made from the dome. The minaret is a covered staircase along the north wall of the mosque and its small canopy rests on four pillars; the canopy likely dates to the 20th century and is reinforced with concrete and steel.

=== Church ===
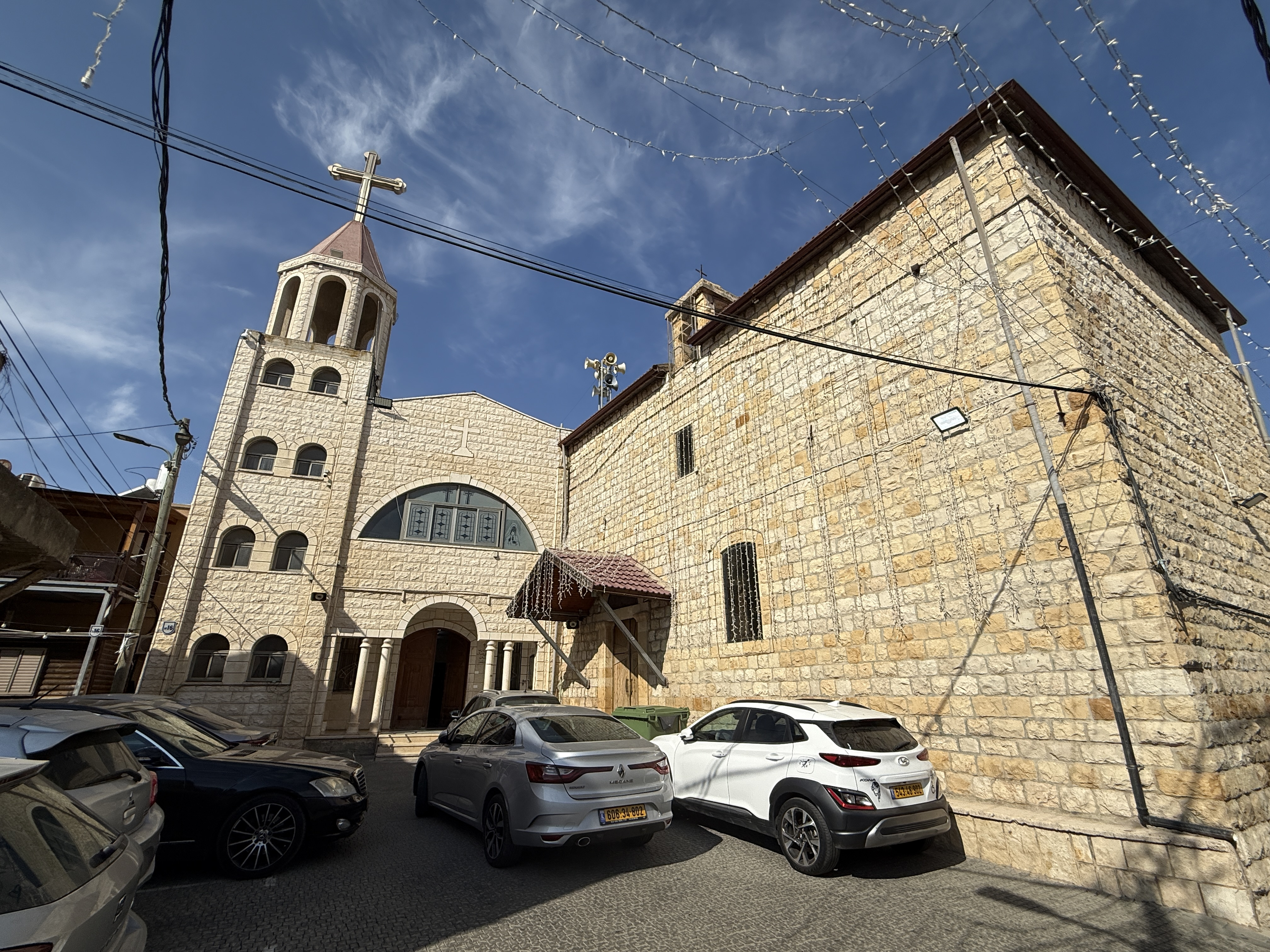
The Greek Catholic church of Deir Hanna, 2025

The Greek Catholic church of St. John in Deir Hanna was built in 1801.

== Voting Patterns ==
In the 2022 election, 95 percent of voters in Deir Hanna voted for the Arab parties, while 3 percent voted for the parties of the right-wing coalition led by Benjamin Netanyahu and 2 percent voted for the parties of the center-left coalition led by Yair Lapid. Among the voters for the Arab parties, 50 percent voted for the Hadash–Ta'al list, while 26 percent voted for Balad and 24 percent voted for Ra'am.

In the 2026 election, 95 percent of voters in Deir Hanna voted for the Arab parties, while 4 percent voted for the parties of the center-left coalition led by Gadi Eisenkot and 0.7 percent voted for the parties of the right-wing coalition led by Benjamin Netanyahu. Among the voters for the Arab parties, 67 percent voted for the Joint List, while 33 percent voted for Ra'am. Voter turnout increased 36 percent from the 2022 election.

== Notable people ==
- Hiam Abbass, actress

== See also ==
- Arab localities in Israel
- Land Day
- Lavra Netofa

== Bibliography ==
- Barron, J.B., ed. (1923). Palestine: Report and General Abstracts of the Census of 1922. Government of Palestine.
- Cohen, Amnon (1973). Palestine in the 18th Century: Patterns of Government and Administration. Jerusalem: The Magnes Press. ISBN 978-0-19-647903-3.
- Conder, C.R.; Kitchener, H.H. (1881). The Survey of Western Palestine: Memoirs of the Topography, Orography, Hydrography, and Archaeology. Vol. 1. London: Committee of the Palestine Exploration Fund.
- Edwards, Camilla; Livingstone, Karen; Petersen, Andrew (1993). "Dayr Hanna: An Eighteenth-Century Fortified Village in Galilee". Levant. 25: 63–92.
- Frankel, Rafael (1988). "Topographical notes on the territory of Acre in the Crusader period". Israel Exploration Journal. 38 (4): 249–272.
- Government of Palestine, Department of Statistics (1945). Village Statistics, April, 1945. Government of Palestine.
- Guérin, V. (1880). Description Géographique Historique et Archéologique de la Palestine (in French). Vol. 3: Galilee, pt. 1. Paris: L'Imprimerie Nationale.
- Hadawi, S. (1970). Village Statistics of 1945: A Classification of Land and Area ownership in Palestine. Palestine Liberation Organization Research Center.
- Joudah, Ahmad Hasan (2013). Revolt in Palestine in the Eighteenth Century: The Era of Shaykh Zahir al-Umar (Second ed.). Piscataway, New Jersey: Gorgias Press. ISBN 978-1-4632-0002-2.
- Mills, E., ed. (1932). Census of Palestine 1931. Population of Villages, Towns and Administrative Areas. Jerusalem: Government of Palestine.
- Morris, B. (1987). The Birth of the Palestinian refugee problem, 1947-1949. Cambridge University Press. ISBN 0-521-33028-9.
- Reichmuth, Stefan (2009). The World of Murtada Al-Zabidi: 1732-91 Life, Networks and Writings. Oxford and Exeter: Gibb Memorial Trust. ISBN 978-0-906094-60-0.
- Silberman, Neil Asher (1996). "Tobacco Pipes, Cotton Prices and Progress". In Orser, Charles E. (ed.). Images of the Recent Past: Readings in Historical Archaeology. Walnut Creek, California: AltaMira Press. pp. 464–. ISBN 0-7619-9141-7.
- Palmer, E.H. (1881). The Survey of Western Palestine: Arabic and English Name Lists Collected During the Survey by Lieutenants Conder and Kitchener, R. E. Transliterated and Explained by E.H. Palmer. Committee of the Palestine Exploration Fund.
- Petersen, Andrew (2001). A Gazetteer of Buildings in Muslim Palestine (British Academy Monographs in Archaeology). Vol. I. Oxford University Press. ISBN 978-0-19-727011-0. Archived from the original on 2021-05-29.
- Philipp, T. (2013). Acre: The Rise and Fall of a Palestinian City, 1730-1831. Columbia University Press. ISBN 9780231506038.
- Pococke, R. (1745). A Description of the East, and some Other Countries. Vol. 2. London: Printed for the author, by W. Bowyer.
- Robinson, E.; Smith, E. (1841). Biblical Researches in Palestine, Mount Sinai and Arabia Petraea: A Journal of Travels in the year 1838. Vol. 3. Boston: Crocker & Brewster.
- Röhricht, R. (1893). (RRH) Regesta regni Hierosolymitani (MXCVII-MCCXCI) (in Latin). Berlin: Libraria Academica Wageriana.
- Schumacher, G. (1888). "Population list of the Liwa of Akka". Quarterly Statement - Palestine Exploration Fund. 20: 169–191.
- Sharon, M. (2004). Corpus Inscriptionum Arabicarum Palaestinae, D-F. Vol. 3. BRILL. ISBN 90-04-13197-3.
- Strehlke, E., ed. (1869). Tabulae Ordinis Theutonici ex tabularii regii Berolinensis codice potissimum. Berlin: Weidmanns.
- Tsafrir, Y.; Leah Di Segni; Judith Green (1994). (TIR): Tabula Imperii Romani: Judaea, Palaestina. Jerusalem: Israel Academy of Sciences and Humanities. p. 163. ISBN 9789652081070.
- Volney, C.-F. (1788). Travels Through Syria and Egypt, in the Years 1783, 1784, and 1785: containing the Present Natural and Political State of Those Countries, Their Productions, Arts, Manufactures, and Commerce : with Observations on the Manners, Customs, and Government of the Turks and Arabs : Illustrated. Vol. 2.(p 265 in the 1959-edition, p. 136 here)
