= Sieges of Tiberias (1742–1743) =

Coordinates: 32°48′N 35°30′E

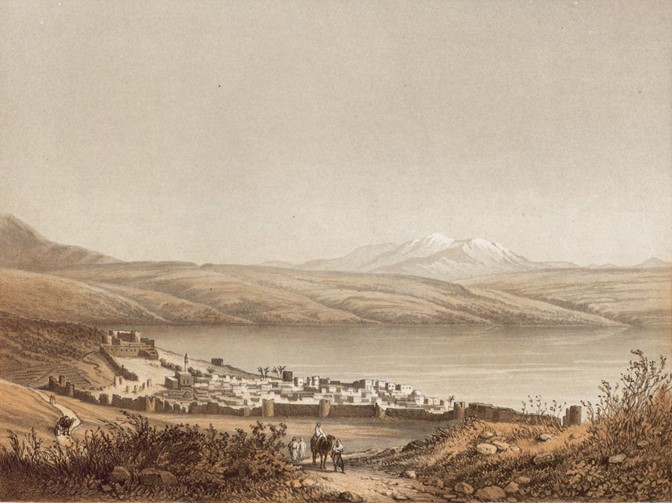
- Tiberias, with its wall fortifications, and the western shores of Lake Tiberias, 1857
Date	Early September–Early December 1742 (first siege); July–late August 1743 (second siege)
Location	Tiberias and its countryside, Sidon Eyalet, Ottoman Empire
Result	Zaydani victory

Belligerents
Ottoman Empire: Damascus Eyalet; Sidon Eyalet; Tripoli Eyalet (second siege only)	Zayadina multazims (tax farmers)

Commanders and leaders
Sulayman Pasha al-Azm (Damascus) †; Ibrahim Pasha al-Azm (Sidon)	Daher al-Umar (Tiberias); Sa'd al-Umar (Deir Hanna)

Strength
Field artillery At least 5 mortars Demolition equipment and experts	At least 300 horsemen 4 cannons
- Location of the Tiberias in modern Israel

The sieges of Tiberias occurred in late 1742 and the summer of 1743 when the Ottoman governor of Damascus, Sulayman Pasha al-Azm, twice attempted and failed to eliminate the increasingly powerful, Tiberias-based multazim (tax farmer), Daher al-Umar, and destroy his fortifications.

Sulayman Pasha operated under orders from the imperial government to execute Daher, and was militarily backed by the governors of Sidon and Tripoli, as well as the district governors of Nablus, Jerusalem, Gaza, and Bedouin levies. Daher and his family, the Zayadina, controlled and fortified several places in the Galilee, with Daher based in Tiberias, and his brother, Sa'd al-Umar, in nearby Deir Hanna. In 1737 and 1738, Daher had intensified his raids, incursions, and operations to areas under the jurisdiction of Damascus, prompting the imperial orders to eliminate him and his local allies.

The first siege of Tiberias lasted for nearly three months, with Sulayman Pasha unable to breach the fortifications and forced to withdraw to lead the Hajj caravan to Mecca. Daher strengthened Tiberias, while unsuccessfully lobbying the imperial government through the French merchants of Acre and the Jewish community in Tiberias, who attempted to leverage their contacts in the imperial capital, Constantinople. Shortly after his return to Damascus, Sulayman Pasha renewed the campaign in July 1743, with more troops and weapons. He attempted to reduce Deir Hanna, which supplied Tiberias with arms and provisions, but died suddenly in his camp. Daher soon after reached a détente with Sulayman Pasha's successor, As'ad Pasha al-Azm. The next fourteen years were generally free of hostilities with Damascus, which enabled Daher to focus on occupying the port of Acre in the 1740s.

== Background ==
Around 1730, a local potentate, Daher al-Umar, backed by his family, the Zayadina, and a powerful Bedouin tribe, the Banu Saqr, ousted the government-appointed mutesellim (sub-governor and tax collector) of Tiberias. The Zayadina had already been well established in the Tiberias area. From at least the late 17th century, its members, including Daher's father, Umar al-Zaydani, had served as multazims (local, limited-term tax farmers) over different subdistricts in the Galilee. As multazims, they were officially subordinate to the governor of Sidon Eyalet, the province which spanned the Galilee, southern Mount Lebanon and the adjacent Mediterranean coast. They collected taxes from their subdistricts for the governor, pocketed the surplus, and had to annually renew their farming rights. While ostensibly under the governor's authority, the governor of Sidon lacked real power outside of the city of Sidon itself and usually held office no longer than two years. Daher obtained the tax farming rights of Tiberias from Sidon after occupying it by force, and took advantage of the governor's weakness to unilaterally expand his family's tax farms throughout the decade.

=== Hostilities between Daher and Damascus ===
In June 1738 the ulema and other notables of Damascus sent a petition to the Ottoman imperial authorities complaining of Daher's assaults, raids and intrigues against areas under the jurisdiction of Damascus Eyalet, particularly the nahiyas (subdistricts) of Quneitra and Hauran and the sanjaks (districts) of Lajjun and Nablus. In 1737 or 1738 he had used the absence of the governor of Damascus, who was leading the Hajj pilgrim caravan to Mecca, to oust the government-appointed chief of the Bedouin in the Damascus region, Sheikh Dayabi, with an ally, Sheikh Ibn Kulayb. The Bedouin chief of Damascus was primarily responsible for supplying the governor with camels for the Hajj caravan. Although Dayabi was restored soon after the return of the governor to Damascus, the act was a major affront to his authority. Daher followed up by leading an assault on the city, with backing from allies among the Twelver Shia Muslim (called 'Metawali') clans of Jabal Amil and the paramount chief of the Mount Lebanon Druze, Mulhim al-Shihabi.

Elsewhere in 1738, Daher had encroached upon the Nablus and Lajjun sanjaks, occupying, plundering, or razing villages there, including in the Atlit coastland. East of the River Jordan, Daher led a raid that year against Turkmen tribes in the Hauran, plundering their herds and other property. Daher's incursions were a continuation of his campaigns to expand his Tiberias-based territory. While his infringements on the jurisdiction of Damascus in the early 1730s had been limited to the province's sanjaks in Palestine (Lajjun and Nablus), the moves of 1737 and 1738 expanded his scope of operations to areas east of the Jordan. These were far more alarming to the governor of Damascus, being closer to his seat of power, and alarmed the imperial government as it posed a threat to the all-important Hajj pilgrim route between Damascus and Mecca.

In addition to the direct attacks by Daher against areas in the Damascus Eyalet, the governor of Damascus became alarmed at Daher's growing power in the Galilee, which was outside of his jurisdiction, and the fortification of Tiberias in particular. As part of his annual tax collection tour, called the dawra, in the sanjaks of Palestine, namely Lajjun, Nablus, and Jerusalem, the governor had to enter the region through the Daughters of Jacob Bridge, the preferred route, or the more dangerous Majami Bridge, north and south of Tiberias, respectively. The close proximity of these access points to Daher's Tiberias was viewed as a threat to the crucial dawra. Thus, according to the historian Amnon Cohen, eliminating Daher had become "a top priority" for the governor, while the imperial government likewise was determined to neutralize him and destroy the fortifications of Tiberias.

=== Prelude ===
Soon after the 1738 Damascene petition, the imperial government ordered the governor of Damascus to suppress Daher and his Galilee-based subordinates, supplying the governor with five mortars and a military expert to supplement his arsenal of field artillery. Specific instructions were given to destroy Daher's fortifications in Tiberias, his brother Sa'd's in Deir Hanna, their cousin Muhammad al-Ali al-Zaydani's in Tarbikha or Tarshiha, and the forts at Jiddin and Suhmata, controlled respectively by their local subordinates Husayn al-Khaliq and Muhammad Nafi. Nevertheless, no action was carried out by the governor and Daher continued operating as before. He strengthened the fortifications of Tiberias, positioning four cannons, acquired from Europe, on a tower he built outside the town, and stocked up on provisions. He also continued raids into the Hauran and, in 1741, attacked the routes connecting Damascus with Palestine and Egypt. The governor of Damascus lodged complaints about these attacks to the imperial authorities. While previous imperial orders demanded Daher "be punished", this time Constantinople explicitly called for Daher's execution. The government's plans were stalled as the governor was soon after dismissed from office.

The new governor, Sulayman Pasha al-Azm, was tasked with carrying out the imperial order to eliminate Daher. Sulayman Pasha received more artillery pieces and demolition experts and equipment from Constantinople. He called on his subordinate governors, the sanjakbeys of Nablus, Jerusalem, and Gaza, as well as Bedouin tribes, to mobilize troops for the campaign. (Note: Among the Bedouins levied were Daher's erstwhile allies, the Banu Saqr, who had since turned on Daher for stemming their raids against the Galilee villages and roads under his control. During the late 1730s, the Banu Saqr had kidnapped Daher's brother Salih and sent him to Damascus, where he was executed by the governor, and allied with the chiefs of the Nablus countryside to stave off Daher's advances around Nazareth.) The governor of Sidon was also ordered to support the campaign. While the imperial orders urged Sulayman Pasha to eliminate Daher and destroy his fortifications, he also had strict instructions not to infringe on Sidon's authority by harming the inhabitants or damaging the local economy, and to conclude the operation before the departure of the Hajj caravan.

== Sieges ==
=== Initial siege ===
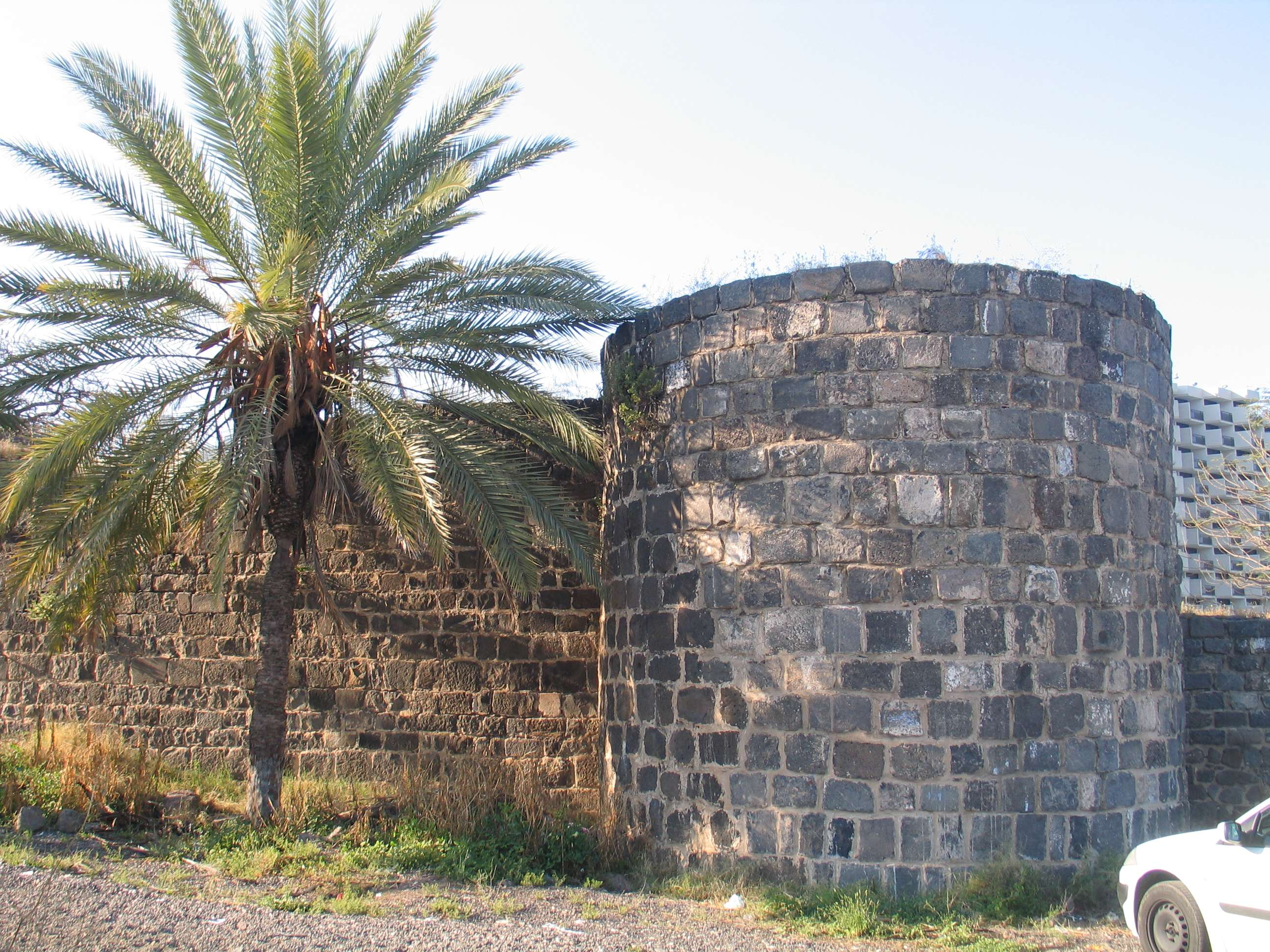
Part of the walls around Tiberias erected by Daher al-Umar

A contemporary Jewish source indicates that Sulayman Pasha attempted to launch a surprise assault against Daher by feigning his mobilization of troops in Palestine as part of the dawra to finance the Hajj caravan. Members of the Jewish community of Damascus, Haim Farhi and Joseph Lutzati, warned the head of the Jewish community of Tiberias, Rabbi Haim Abulafia, of Sulayman Pasha's actual intention, and they in turn alerted Daher, who was operating in the Safed area at the time. Abulafia elected to remain and support Daher. He persuaded his Jewish coreligionists not to flee the city, lest their newly-built homes be demolished by the other Tiberians who would view their flight as a demoralizing betrayal.

Sulayman Pasha launched the campaign from Damascus on 3 September. The siege of Tiberias lasted about ninety days. During its course, Daher proclaimed his innocence of the charges laid against him and his loyalty to the sultan, but negotiations with the governor were futile. Daher's men made several sorties against the government coalition. He was also able to secure a steady supply of provisions and weapons into Tiberias. Sa'd and 300 of his horsemen launched attacks from Deir Hanna on the besiegers. Sulayman Pasha was unable to breach the fortifications and had to lift the siege to lead the Hajj caravan, in December 1742.

Daher used the withdrawal as a respite to strengthen his fortifications in Tiberias, as well as the smaller forts of the Zayadina, particularly Shefa-Amr in the western Lower Galilee. He lodged appeals to Constantinople indirectly through the French merchants of Acre to lobby the French ambassador in the capital. He also had Abulafia lobby his Damascene coreligionists and their Jewish contacts in Constantinople to establish an additional line of communication with the imperial authorities. All of these efforts to influence the government in Daher's favor failed.

=== Renewal of the siege ===
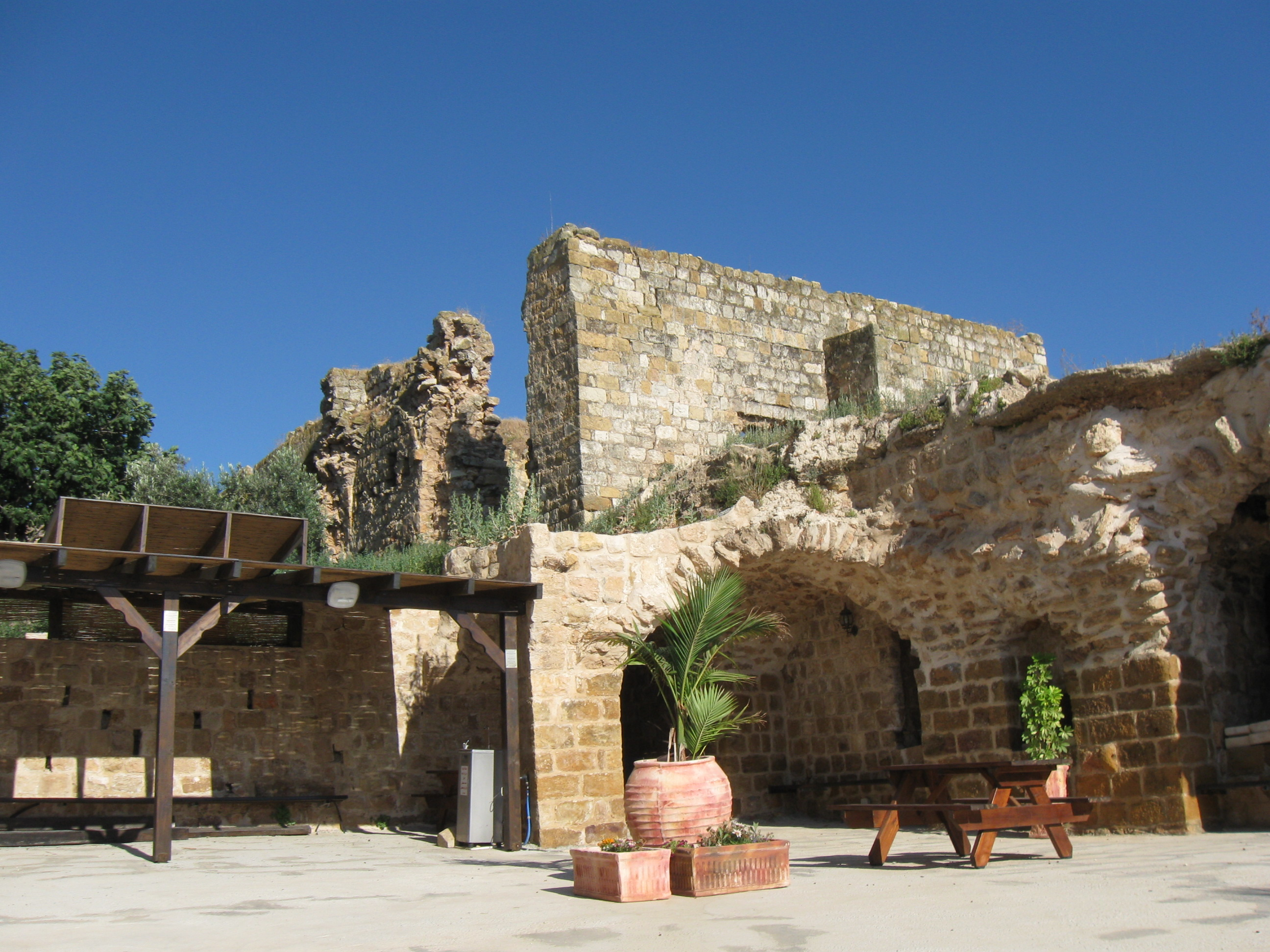
Remains of the Zaydani fortress of Deir Hanna

Soon after his return from Mecca in April 1743, Sulayman Pasha renewed the campaign on Constantinople's orders. He was further reinforced by the governor of Tripoli Eyalet and timar (fief)-holders and other military chiefs from the Damascus Eyalet, along with more military experts and equipments, shipped by the imperial government to Haifa. Sulayman Pasha departed Damascus in July. Instead of focusing on Tiberias alone, this time he first attempted to move against Deir Hanna, probably to sever Tiberias's links to the countryside and prevent supplies from reaching the town.

Sulayman Pasha died suddenly during the campaign, while in the village of Lubya, a short distance west of Tiberias, in August. Upon hearing the news, Daher dispatched his forces against the government troops, who had been left in disarray following Sulayman Pasha's death. Daher's men plundered the opposing camp, carrying away weapons, supplies, and money.

== Aftermath ==
Sulayman Pasha's successor, his nephew As'ad Pasha al-Azm, relented from further action against Daher. Ibn al-Falaqinsi, the defterdar (treasurer) of As'ad Pasha, formally made peace with Daher in the governor's name in 1743. Daher then sent As'ad Pasha and Ibn al-Falaqinsi expensive gifts. The following fourteen years were characterized by peace between Daher and Damascus, partly because As'ad Pasha was dissuaded by his uncle's unsuccessful experience and preoccupied with domestic affairs. With the threat to his eastern flank neutralized, Daher resumed focus on capturing the port of Acre, which he occupied in 1744. By 1750, Acre became his new headquarters, while he entrusted control of Tiberias to his son Salibi.

== Bibliography ==
- Barnai, Jacob (1992). The Jews in Palestine in the Eighteenth Century: Under the Patronage of the Istanbul Committee of Officials for Palestine. Translated by Naomi Goldblum. Tuscaloosa, Alabama: University of Alabama Press. ISBN 978-0-8173-0572-7.
- Cohen, Amnon (1973). Palestine in the 18th Century: Patterns of Government and Administration. Jerusalem: The Magnes Press. ISBN 978-0-19-647903-3.
- Joudah, Ahmad Hasan (2013). Revolt in Palestine in the Eighteenth Century: The Era of Shaykh Zahir al-Umar (Second ed.). Gorgias Press. ISBN 978-1-4632-0002-2.
- Petersen, Andrew (2001). A Gazetteer of Buildings in Muslim Palestine (British Academy Monographs in Archaeology). Vol. I. Oxford University Press. ISBN 978-0-19-727011-0.
- Philipp, Thomas (2001). Acre: The Rise and Fall of a Palestinian City, 1730–1831. Columbia University Press. ISBN 978-0-231-50603-8.
- Shamir, Shimon (1963). "As'ad Pasha al-'Aẓm and Ottoman Rule in Damascus (1743–58)". Bulletin of the School of Oriental and African Studies. 26 (1): 1–28. doi:10.1017/S0041977X00074243. JSTOR 611304. S2CID 162913446.
