= Sa'd al-Umar =

Sa'd al-Umar al-Zaydani (late 17th century–1761) was a sheikh of the Zayadina and multazim (tax farmer) in the Galilee. He founded the fortress and mosque of Deir Hanna, controlling it from the early 1730s until his death. From Deir Hanna, he aided his younger brother, the paramount sheikh of the Zayadina and practical ruler of the Galilee Daher al-Umar, counter the governor of Damascus in 1742–1743. He was Daher's longtime chief political adviser, but was killed on Daher's orders in 1761 due to his abortive conspiracy to oust and replace his brother.

== Early career ==
Sa'd was the eldest son of Umar al-Zaydani, the "paramount sheikh of the Galilee" in the early 1700s. Umar was a multazim active in the eastern Lower Galilee while his brother, Sa'd's uncle, Ali was a multazim in the western Lower Galilee, controlling the cotton-rich villages of Shefa-Amr, I'billin and Tamra (a third brother, Hamza, was active around Nazareth). When Umar died in 1706 or c. 1708), Sa'd succeeded him as the head of their family, the Zayadina. The Zayadina were originally based in the environs of Tiberias, but according to one version of the family's origins, cited by the chronicler Mikha'il Sabbagh (1775–1826), Sa'd moved the family to the village of Arraba in the Shaghur region in 1707 due to a blood feud in Tiberias involving his youngest brother, Daher al-Umar. Other versions date the family's move to Arraba earlier, to the time of Sa'd's grandfather, Salih ('Abu Zaydan'). In Sabbagh's version, Sa'd was invited to settle his family in Arraba by the powerful Banu Saqr tribe, the dominant Bedouins of northern Palestine whose sheikh resided in the village.

Sa'd, his youngest brother Daher, and cousin Muhammad (the son of Ali), all served as multazims in different areas of the Galilee during the 1710s and 1720s. Like the previous Zaydani generation, they engaged in trade with the European, mainly French, merchants of Acre, selling them the cotton and wheat of their villages in exchange for cash advances covering their tax obligations to the provincial governor of Sidon, to whom they were officially subordinate. Sa'd and Daher further maintained the trade relations established by their father in Damascus, pariticpating in merchant caravans to the city. Daher emerged as the practical leader of the family when the Banu Saqr chose him to be their representative with the authorities, seeking to benefit from the Zayadina's relations with the government. The Banu Saqr's bypassing of Sa'd for the younger Daher was intended as a signal to the Zaydani sheikhs that the powerful tribe did not seek to subordinate itself to their family. The move "shocked" Sa'd, in the words of historian Ahmad Hasan Joudah. In any case, in 1730, Daher used his newfound alliance with the Bedouin to take over the town of Tiberias, ousting its appointed governor, obtaining its iltizam from the governor of Sidon, and making it the headquarters of the Zayadina.

== Sheikh of Deir Hanna ==
As Daher made inroads in the northern Galilee, Sa'd relocated from Arraba to a nearby site, Deir Hanna, which he built up as his fortified headquarters. Combined, Arraba and Deir Hanna formed the rural headquarters of the Zayadina. Sa'd founded the mosque of Deir Hanna in 1732–1733, as testified by its dedicatory inscription:

Praise is due to Allah alone for what he bestowed upon
the Hashimite (Prophet), the best of mankind.
O, how fortunate is he who witnessed, and held in esteem
the builder of this dwelling place—Sa'd al-'Umar.

Sa'd was responsible for Deir Hanna's core fortifications, namely its high inner enclosure wall along which were built twelve towers. A chronicler noted in 1776, when the fortifications were destroyed by the Ottoman governor Ahmad Pasha al-Jazzar, that it was "not possible to describe [the extent of] the fortifications or the strength of the citadel".

=== Conflicts with governor of Damascus ===
Sulayman Pasha al-Azm, governor of Sidon from 1728, backed by his brother, the governor of Damascus Ismail Pasha al-Azm, subdued the Zayadina in Tiberias and captured and imprisoned Sa'd in Sidon for his failure to pay his tax obligations, which amounted to 22,000 kurush. In June 1730, a group of French traders based in Sidon covered Sa'd's tax liability and Sa'd was reinstated as multazim of Safed. In exchange, Sa'd mortgaged the cotton crop of Shefa-Amr, I'billin and Tamra (the sources variously place Sa'd, his brother Daher or his cousin Muhammad al-Ali as the multazim of this area) to the merchants. The harvest that year was poor and after failing to repay the French in cotton, the merchants confronted Sa'd in Tiberias, where Daher was in charge. Daher offered to pay back the 22,000 kurush with twelve percent interest, but the merchants insisted on payment in cotton and threatened to have the governor of Sidon arrest Daher as ransom.

Sa'd and/or his brothers Salih and Yusuf, together with their Metawali (Lebanese Twelver Shia Muslims) allies launched attacks against eleven villages in a district of the Damascus province in 1734. Throughout the 1730s, the Zayadina launched several raids against places under Damascus's jurisdiction, while expanding and consolidating their control throughout the Galilee. In 1738, an imperial firman (edict) to the governor of Damascus called on him to demolish Sa'd's fortress in Deir Hanna as well as the fortifications of Daher in Tiberias and their cousin Muhammad al-Ali in 'Tarshikha' (Tarbikha or Tarshiha). Conflict between the Zayadina and the authorities in Damascus culminated with a siege of Tiberias by Sulayman Pasha al-Azm, who had served as governor of Damascus in 1734–1738 and again in 1741. Sa'd attempted to relieve Daher from his base in Deir Hanna. In one such engagement, he led 300 of his horsemen on an attack against the besiegers in mid-October 1742, which resulted in at least eleven of Sa'd's men being slain. Unable to conquer Tiberias in time to lead the Hajj caravan to Mecca, Sulayman Pasha lifted the siege at the end of 1742.

In 1743, Sulayman Pasha renewed his assault against the Zayadina with a larger army, this time concentrating on Sa'd in Deir Hanna in the hopes of conquering it and cutting off Tiberias from resupply and reinforcements. On 24 August, Sulayman Pasha died suddenly at his camp in nearby Lubya and his army disbanded. His successor, his nephew As'ad Pasha al-Azm, refrained from confronting the Zayadina, leading to a fourteen-year detente.

== Relations with Daher al-Umar ==
In 1743–1744, when Daher moved to take over the key port of Acre, home to the burgeoning base of the Galilee's French cotton merchants, Sa'd advised that the government would be unable to stop him, an "astute observation", according to historian Thomas Philipp. Joudah describes Sa'd as "a strong and ambitious person", who acted as Daher's "principal counselor since the beginning of his political life, and was largely responsible for most of [Daher's] successes".

Nevertheless, Sa'd was also alleged by Sabbagh to have envied Daher and in c. 1761 conspired to kill and replace him with the backing of the new governor of Damascus, Uthman Pasha al-Kurji and Daher's rebellious son Uthman al-Daher. Sa'd also had the backing of the Banu Saqr. In 1761 or 1762, Daher, having discovered the plot, turned his son Uthman to assassinate Sa'd, thereby removing him as Daher's chief adversary within his family. Control of Deir Hanna was afterward passed to Daher's son, Ahmad al-Daher.

Genealogical tree of the Zayadina

Zaydan
Salih
Ali (fl. 1704 – c. 1723)	Umar (d. 1706)	Hamza (fl. 1708)
Muhammad (d. 1743)	Ayyub	Shammah	Sa'd (d. 1761)	Yusuf (fl. 1761)	Salih (d. 1738)	Daher al-Umar (d. 1775)
Karim (d. 1775)	Nijma	Salibi (d. 1773)	Uthman	Ali (d. 1776)	Sa'id	Ahmad	Abbas (d. 1810)	Sa'd al-Din	Salih (fl. 1775 – c. 1799
Nasir	Abd al-Aziz	Kanj	Jahjah	Fadil Husayn (d. 1810)	Kamil Hasan	Muhammad	Yusuf	As'ad	Husayn (fl. 1850)
Abbas	Ali (fl. 1898–1892)	Kanj (d. 1930)	Daher	Salih	Ahmad

== Bibliography ==
- Cohen, Amnon (1973). Palestine in the 18th Century: Patterns of Government and Administration. Jerusalem: The Magnes Press. ISBN 978-0-19-647903-3.
- Firro, Kais (1992). A History of the Druzes. Vol. 1. Brill. ISBN 9004094377.
- Joudah, Ahmad Hasan (2013) [1987]. Revolt in Palestine in the Eighteenth Century: The Era of Shaykh Zahir al-Umar (Second ed.). Piscataway, New Jersey: Gorgias Press. ISBN 978-1-4632-0002-2.
- Philipp, Thomas (2001). Acre: The Rise and Fall of a Palestinian City, 1730–1831. New York: Columbia University Press. ISBN 978-0-231-50603-8.
- Rafeq, Abdul-Karim (1966). The Province of Damascus, 1723–1783. Beirut: Khayats. OCLC 26512897.
- Sharon, Moshe (2004). Corpus Inscriptionum Arabicarum Palaestinae, D-F. Leiden and Boston: Brill. ISBN 978-90-04-13197-2.
