= Ali ibn Salih al-Zaydani =

Ali ibn Salih al-Zaydani (fl. 1704 – c. 1723), also referred to by his kunya (paedonomic) Abu Ibrahim, was a sheikh of the Zayadina, an Arab family whose members served as local strongmen and multazims (tax farmers) in the Galilee in the 18th century. Ali was based in the village of Damun and his tax farm was typically the cotton-rich district that spanned Shefa-Amr, Tamra and I'billin, with his influence sometimes extending to Acre.

== Life ==
Ali was one of at least three sons of Salih, the sheikh of the Zayadina, a family of Bedouin origin that settled as cultivators in the Galilee in the 17th century. Ali's brother Umar al-Zaydani became the paramount sheikh of the family and held the iltizam (tax farm) of the Safed area at least between 1700 and his death in 1706. Ali's other brother, Hamza, had his zone of influence in the area around Nazareth. Ali was based in the village of Damun. He was the most prominent local sheikh in the western Galilee, his iltizam spanning the three top cotton-producing villages of the Galilee, Shefa-Amr, Tamra and I'billin. In 1704, he was addressed in a letter by the French vice-consul of Acre, then a small port village home to a burgeoning cotton trade between European merchants and local sheikhs, including Ali. At least during the first decade of the 18th century, Ali maintained exclusive trade relations with the Dutch consul and merchant Paul Maashook, who provided Ali cash advances in return for the entire cotton crop of his district.

In 1722–1723, Ali constructed a mosque in Damun, for which he was credited in an inscription in the mosque (now lost) as "He who has occupied the summit of the degrees of good fortune ... The possessor of generosity, glory and the ancient noble ancestry, even their peak". The reading of his name as "Ali ibn Salih" settled the debate among historians as to the name of his and Umar's father (Salih). Ali died in Damun and his tomb formerly stood in the village.

== Descendants ==
Ali was succeeded over his tax farm in Damun (including Shefa-Amr) by his son Muhammad al-Ali (also known by his kunya 'Abu Dani'). Muhammad was the commander of the Zaydani cavalry under his cousin, the paramount sheikh of the Zayadina Daher al-Umar, for whom he also served as an occasional political adviser. Muhammad was also the brother-in-law of Daher, having married his sister Shammah. As Daher consolidated his domination over the rest of the Galilee, he considered Muhammad, who had his own political ambitions, as an obstacle to his control of Acre as an outlet for his cotton product. In 1743, Daher had Muhammad assassinated. Another of Ali's sons was Ayyub, whose son Karim al-Ayyubi married Daher's daughter Nijma and served as Daher's governor over Jaffa in the early 1770s. Ali's descendants continued to live in Damun until the village's depopulation and destruction by Israeli forces in the 1948 Palestine war. Afterward, they relocated to Kafr Manda.

Genealogical tree of the Zayadina

Zaydan
Salih
Ali (fl. 1704 – c. 1723)	Umar (d. 1706)	Hamza (fl. 1708)
Muhammad (d. 1743)	Ayyub	Shammah	Sa'd (d. 1761)	Yusuf (fl. 1761)	Salih (d. 1738)	Daher al-Umar (d. 1775)
Karim (d. 1775)	Nijma	Salibi (d. 1773)	Uthman	Ali (d. 1776)	Sa'id	Ahmad	Abbas (d. 1810)	Sa'd al-Din	Salih (fl. 1775 – c. 1799
Nasir	Abd al-Aziz	Kanj	Jahjah	Fadil Husayn (d. 1810)	Kamil Hasan	Muhammad	Yusuf	As'ad	Husayn (fl. 1850)
Abbas	Ali (fl. 1898–1892)	Kanj (d. 1930)	Daher	Salih	Ahmad

== Bibliography ==
- Cohen, Amnon (1973). Palestine in the 18th Century: Patterns of Government and Administration. Jerusalem: The Magnes Press. ISBN 978-0-19-647903-3.
- Joudah, Ahmad Hasan (2013). Revolt in Palestine in the Eighteenth Century: The Era of Shaykh Zahir al-Umar (Second ed.). Piscataway, New Jersey: Gorgias Press. ISBN 978-1-4632-0002-2.
- Mazarib, Tomer (2021). From Desert to Town The Integration of Bedouin Into Arab Fellahin Villages and Towns in the Galilee, 1700-2020. Liverpool: Liverpool University Press. ISBN 9781789761535.
- Philipp, T. (2001). Acre: The Rise and Fall of a Palestinian City, 1730–1831. Columbia University Press. ISBN 978-0-231-50603-8.
- Sharon, M. (2004). Corpus Inscriptionum Arabicarum Palaestinae, D-F. Leiden and Boston: Brill. ISBN 978-90-04-13197-2.
