= Ali al-Daher =

Subgovernor of Safed
- In office Early 1760s – 1776

Personal details
- Died: November 1776
- Children: Fadil Husayn; Kamil Hasan
- Parent: Daher al-Umar (father)
- Relatives: Zayadina (clan); Salibi al-Daher (brother); Ahmad al-Daher (brother)

Ali al-Daher, commonly transliterated ʿAlī al-Ẓāhir or ʿAlī al-Ḍāhir, was one of the sons and a deputy commander of Sheikh Daher al-Umar, the 18th-century tax farmer and strongman of northern Palestine during Ottoman rule. Ali administered Safed and its environs and led several successful military campaigns for his father, but rebelled against him on several occasions, including in collaboration with the mamluk strongman of Egypt, Abu al-Dhahab, in 1774–1775. After Daher's death in August 1775, he assumed leadership of their family, the Zayadina, in its last stand against the Ottoman governor Ahmad Pasha al-Jazzar. He was slain in 1776, marking the end of Zaydani power in the Galilee, which they had dominated since the start of the century.

== Initial rebellions and reconciliations ==
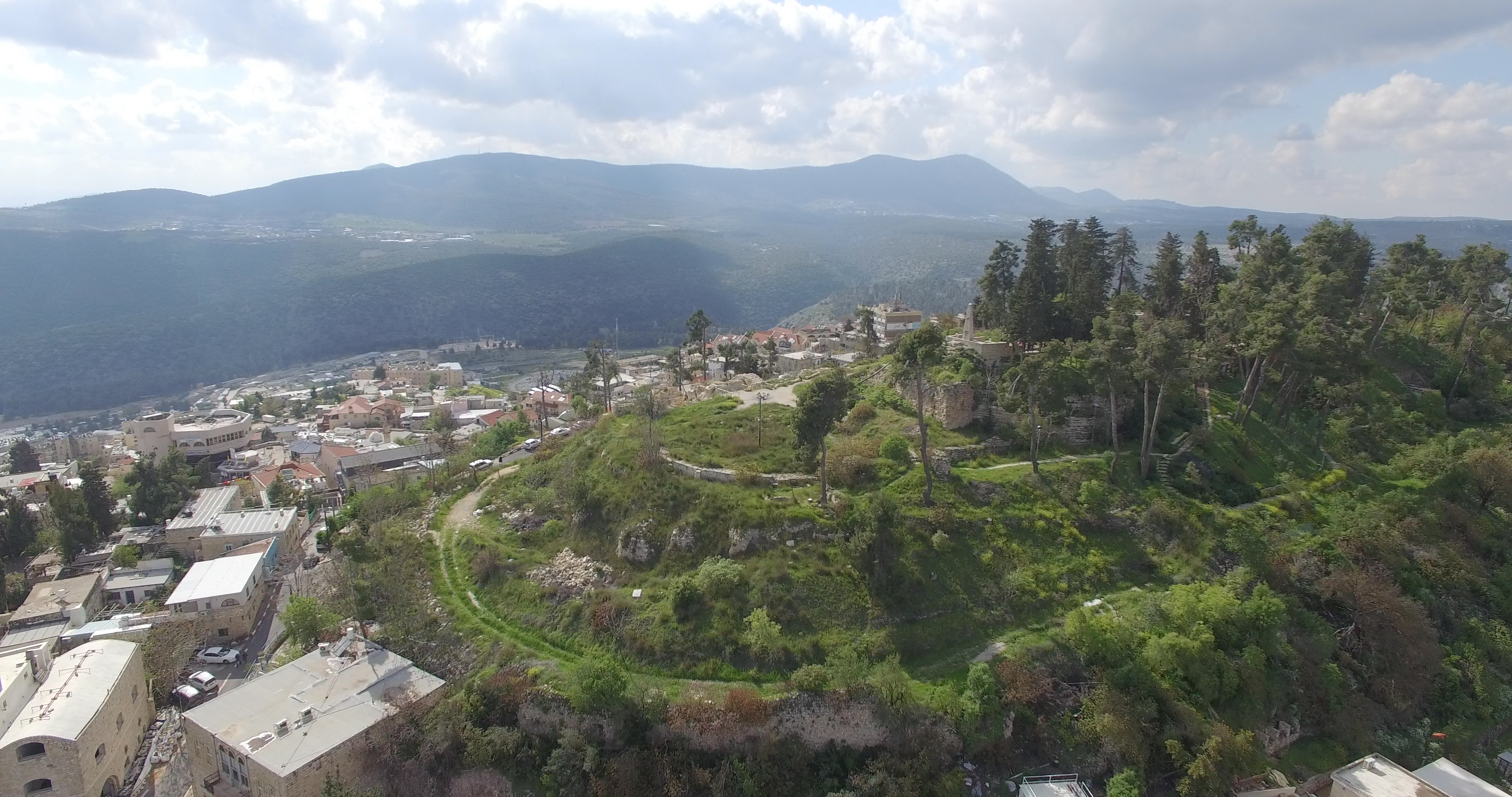
Ruins of the hilltop Citadel of Safed overlooking the town of Safed

Ali's family, the Zayadina, had become established in the Galilee in the late 17th century and by the early 18th century, their members served as multazims (tax farmers) there. Ali's father Daher al-Umar became the paramount sheikh of the Zayadina in the 1730s and by the 1740s, the family under his leadership had taken control of the Galilee. Daher established his headquarters in Acre, and at least by the 1760s began appointing his sons to administer different parts of the Galilee. Ali was headquartered in Safed. Beginning in the 1760s, Daher's sons began to clamor for more power within the sheikhdom and vied to position themselves as successor to their aging father, who was in his sixties by then. In these struggles, the sons had the support of their respective maternal families and encouragement and/or direct support from external actors, like the Druze and Metawali (Twelver Shia Muslim) clans of Mount Lebanon and Jabal Amil, respectively, and the Ottoman provincial governors of Damascus and Sidon.

According to the historian Ahmad Joudah, Ali was Daher's "most competent" and "most dependable son", helping him suppress internal dissent and repulse external attacks. Ali first rebelled against Daher in March 1762 when he and his younger full brother Sa'id demanded Daher step down as a paramount sheikh or relinquish his tax farms. The brothers were supported by Daher's enemy, the governor of Damascus Uthman Pasha al-Kurji and the Metawali sheikh Nasif al-Nassar. Ultimately, through the mediation of Nasif's Metawali rival, Sheikh Qublan, Daher settled his dispute with Ali by providing him some concessions. Ali and another brother, Ahmad, backed Daher in countering a revolt by Ali's half-brother Uthman al-Daher in May 1766. Uthman had the support of the Druze of the Galilee, the Druze under the Shihab emirs of Mount Lebanon and Sheikh Nasif's Metawalis. The two sides fought in the Upper Galilee, around Safed, where Daher and Ali defeated Uthman and the Metawalis.

Ali, cognizant of his important military role in the sheikhdom, aspired for greater territorial control. Beginning in September 1767, his requests to Daher for possession of the strategic, fortified village of Deir Hanna, the former seat of Daher's late brother Sa'd al-Umar, and the fortified village of Deir al-Qassi were successively denied. These refusals prompted him to take control of both by force, leading Daher to launch a campaign against him with his loyalists, Maghrebi mercenaries, and a force of Metawalis. The stronger force manned by Daher swayed Ali to negotiate terms, resulting in Daher's conceding Deir al-Qassi to him and reconfirming him over Safed.

Shortly afterward, Ali renewed his rebellion against Daher, this time in support of his brother Sa'id, whose requests for control of the small villages of Tur'an and Hittin were denied by Daher, despite Ali's attempts to mediate. Daher considered the Zaydani domains already sufficiently subdivided among his sons, and recommended Ali stake out part of his possessions to satisfy Sa'id. Ali escalated the demands to include possession of Deir Hanna for himself. In the ensuing struggle, Ali and Sa'id had the backing of Uthman Pasha al-Kurji, governor of Damascus, Yusuf Shihab, paramount emir of the Druze, and Sheikh Nasif, while Daher was supported by his son Uthman, Muhammad Pasha al-Azm, governor of Sidon (to which the Galilee administratively belonged) and Sheikh Qublan. Through the mediation of Daher's chief minister, Ibrahim al-Sabbagh, Daher granted Sa'id control of Tur'an and Hittin, but Ali remained dissatisfied at not receiving Deir Hanna. He allied with his eldest (half) brother Salibi al-Daher of Tiberias, who moved against Daher after he demobilized his troops. Ali bested his father, taking over Deir Hanna and forcing Daher's retreat to Acre. In October 1767, Daher gathered his Maghrebi mercenaries and launched an assault against the Deir Hanna fortress. Ali capitulated and fled, but left behind his wife and children in the hopes of winning over Daher's sympathies. Consequently, Daher agreed to sell the fortress to Ali for the sum of 12,500 piasters and twenty-five of Ali's finest war horses.

== Military campaigns against Damascus ==
In 1770–1771, the allied forces of Daher and Egypt's mamluk strongman Ali Bey al-Kabir led by Ismail Bey, launched a campaign against Uthman Pasha of Damascus. Commanding forces under his father, Ali launched raids against the Nu'aym Bedouins in the Hauran, while Daher and Isma'il Bey were poised to strike against Damascus. The assault against never materialized and the mamluks withdrew. When the mamluk campaign against Damascus was renewed, the mamluks now led by Abu al-Dhahab, Daher sent Ali with 3,000 horsemen, composed of Safadiyya (people of Safed, i.e. the Galilee) and Metawalis, to join the expedition. Abu al-Dhahab appointed Ali to lead a vanguard of his men against the forces of Uthman Pasha, swelled by reinforcements from additional provinces. Per Abu al-Dhahab's instructions, Ali launched the assault against the Ottomans' main camp at Darayya on the outskirts of Damascus and feigned retreat upon the Ottomans' charge against him. Ali had lured the Ottoman troops into an ambush by Abu al-Dhahab's troops, who opened a barrage and then launched an assault against them. Abu al-Dhahab captured Damascus days later but withdrew to Egypt suddenly.

On 2 September 1771, Ali commanded part of his father's army at the Battle of Lake Hula against Uthman Pasha, leading the main assault against the governor and his troops. The assault forced them to retreat across the River Jordan, causing most of Uthman Pasha's army to drown. On 20 October, in a battle between a coalition of the Zayadina and Metawalis against Yusuf Shihab's Druze warriors, Ali again commanded a key maneuver against the opposing forces: he launched the forward assault against Shihab's men, only to feign retreat and lure the Druze into an ambush by the Zaydani and Metawali horsemen. Uthman Pasha was dismissed as governor days later and replaced by Muhammad Pasha al-Azm. Ali continued his military activities across the province, taking the fortified village of Bayt Jibrin in between Hebron and Ramla shortly before 30 November. Not long after, he moved on the peripheries of Damascus itself, collecting the tax revenues of those villages. Despite calls for intervention, the authorities in Damascus did not offer a serious response to Ali's raids. On 30 September, Ali led Daher's forces in helping the Metawalis and Druze repulse an expedition sent by the supreme army commander of Syria, Uthman Pasha al-Wakil, in the Beqaa Valley.

== Renewed rebellion against Daher ==
By 1774, Daher and Uthman Pasha al-Wakil had arranged peace terms. Ali, whose "distinctive record undoubtedly must have inspired him to attempt to succeed" Daher, especially in light of his elder brother Salibi's death the year prior, renewed his rebellion against his father. He made demands of Daher, which the latter rejected, leading him to declare a revolt from Safed, which he had refortified. Daher and Ahmad, who governed Tiberias and Jabal Ajlun, launched an assault on Ali in Rameh on 11 July 1774. In the ensuing battle, Ali shot Ahmad, wounding him in the leg, then defeating Daher and forcing his father and brother to retreat to Deir Hanna.

The strife between Daher and Ali encouraged Abu al-Dhahab, who had by then replaced Ali Bey as strongman of Egypt and was gearing up for a campaign against Daher, to ally with Ali. In exchange for his backing against his father, Abu al-Dhahab agreed to recognize him as paramount sheikh of the Zayadina. Abu al-Dhahab launched his campaign in March 1775, capturing Gaza and Ramla and besieging Jaffa on 3 April. During the siege, Ali persuaded his brother Sa'id to discard Daher's orders to assist Jaffa's defenders. Jaffa fell on 20 May and the massacre of all its men led Acre's residents to flee in panic on 23 May. Daher, whose calls for assistance from his sons went unheeded, likely due to Ali's influence over his brothers, evacuated the next day. Ali subsequently entered the city and declared himself governor. He notified Abu al-Dhahab that he had driven Daher from Acre, but Abu al-Dhahab denied his demand to serve as governor and ordered his prompt withdrawal. Ali consequently departed by 29 May, taking with him the city's cannons, munititions and provisions to Deir Hanna and Safed. Abu al-Dhahab's forces gained control of Acre the next day and made Murad Bey governor. He invited Ali to meet him in Acre, but Ali considered this a ruse to eliminate him and ignored the summons. Afterward, Abu al-Dhahab stormed Safed, plundering it and damaging its citadel.

Abu al-Dhahab died of a sudden illness on 10 June and the next day, Daher's chief lieutenant, the commander of his Maghrebi mercenaries Ahmad Agha al-Dinkizli, moved to restore Daher's control of Acre. He was driven out by Ali's ally among the Maghrebis, Abdallah al-Wawi, but soon after gained control over the different Maghrebi factions. He sent urgent notices to Daher to return to the city, otherwise it would surely be occupied by Ali; Daher reentered Acre on 12 June.

== Rebellion against al-Jazzar ==
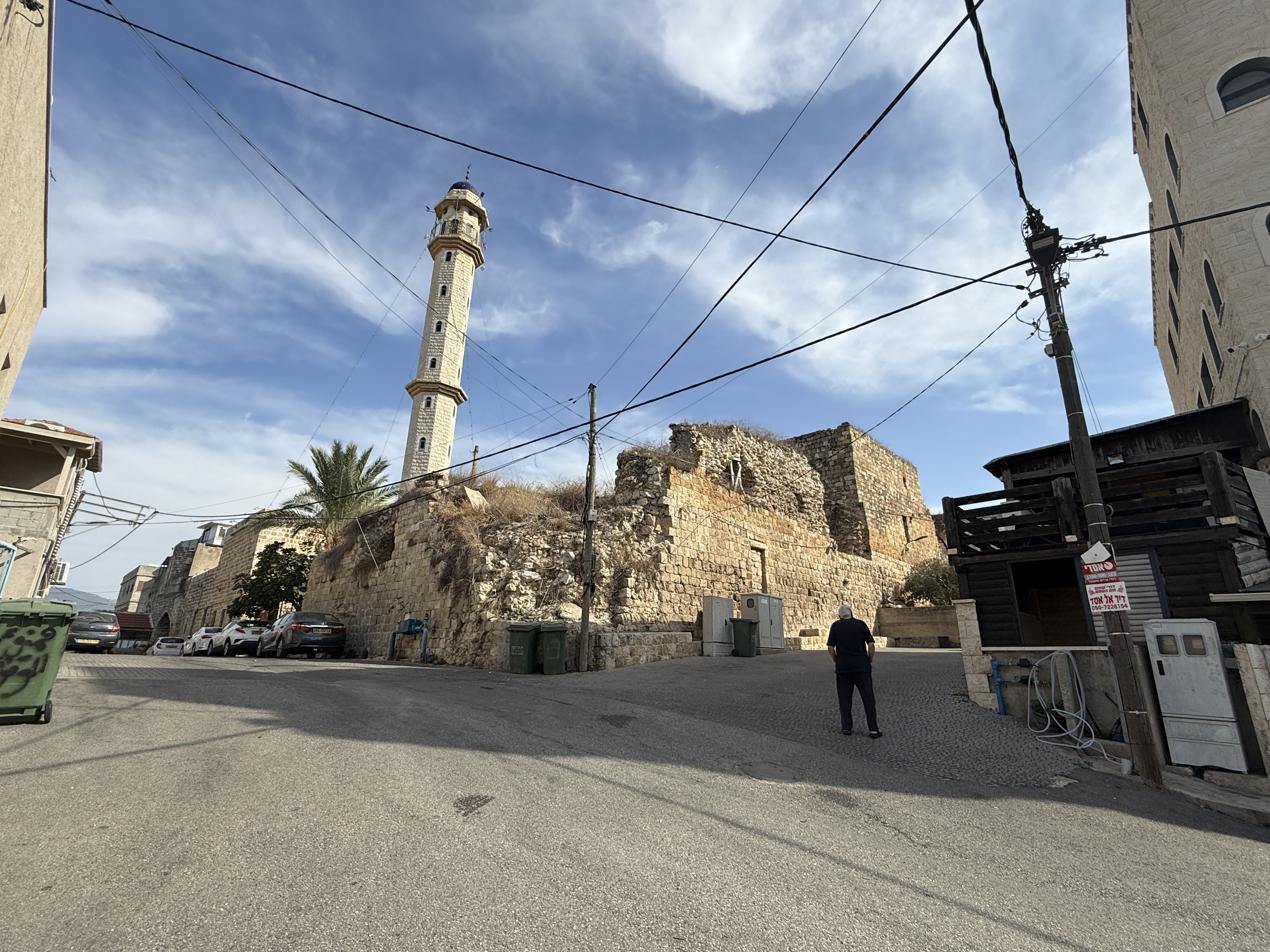
Ruins of the Zaydani fortifications and palace at Deir Hanna

In October 1775, an imperial Ottoman force led by Hasan Pasha al-Jaza'iri blockaded Acre and Daher was killed while attempting his escape from the city. In conjunction with naval force, the Ottomans organized an army led by the governor of Damascus, Muhammad Pasha al-Azm, and including a force led by Ahmad Pasha al-Jazzar to reassert direct government control over Acre and the Zaydani domains. Ali and his brothers maintained their experienced private armies and fortified villages. Al-Jazzar was appointed governor of Sidon and made his headquarters in Acre, from where he was directed by the imperial government to eliminate the Zayadina's hold over the area and destroy their forts. Initially, Ali and his brothers attempted to block supplies from the countryside reaching Acre, intending to pressure Jazzar into quitting the city. It had little effect, and Jazzar soon after turned Uthman against Ali by recognizing the former as his deputy over the fortified town of Shefa-Amr and nominating him shaykh al-mashayikh of the Safed area, a nod for Uthman to oust Ali from his center of power. Jazzar also gained the defection of Ahmad, who was based in Tiberias.

Ali, the most militarily capable and formidable of Daher's sons, remained Jazzar's chief obstacle to asserting power in Acre's Galilee countryside. As Jazzar made preparations for war in Acre, Ali consolidated control over the Galilee from his refortified Safed headquarters. His territory stretched from Abu Sinan and Majd al-Krum in the west to Tiberias in the east, and besides these places also included the fortified villages of Bi'ina, Rameh, Nahf, Suhmata, Beit Jann, Sajur, Buqei'a, Julis, Yarka, Deir al-Qassi, Sa'sa' and Jiddin, effectively most of the Galilee. He paid a large sum to Muhammad Pasha of Damascus to lobby the imperial government to recognize his authority over this area. In the spring of 1776, Ali's horsemen launched attacks against the village's on Acre's coastal plain and almost reaching Acre's walls; they destroyed one of the two water works that supplied the city. Jazzar responded by mobilizing his troops in Amqa. Ali gathered forces from Abu Sinan, Majd al-Krum and Deir Hanna and besieged Amqa, but a support troop from Acre dispersed his forces and relieved Jazzar.

Afterward, Jazzar moved on the offensive, with his forces defeating Ali's men at Abu Sinan and Jazzar personally leading a subsequent assault against Majd al-Krum. The latter was walled with a number of guard towers and garrisoned by its own population, referred to in the sources as asker-i Arab. Jazzar subdued the fortress and executed its defenders, sending their heads to Constantinople as evidence of his success. Ali moved on to Rameh, where he barricaded with some 1,200 of his fighters, while Jazzar positioned himself in nearby Nahf, sending patrols which clashed with Ali's forces. Viewing his position as untenable, Ali withdrew his troops from Rameh and Beit Jann, concentrating them in Deir Hanna and Safed. These events likely preceded June, as the authorities in Constantinople had become aware of Rameh's capture by then.

Jazzar then targeted Deir Hanna, which was exceptionally well-fortified, protected by a double wall, the inner with twelve towers and the outer with two. Ali left his brother Sa'id there to stave off Jazzar while Ali could collect reinforcements from Safed, but Jazzar succeeded in laying siege to the village. The siege lasted for several weeks, during which Jazzar worked to split the Zayadina's ranks further, appealing to Ahmad in Tiberias, who had rejoined Ali by then, and bringing Uthman to participate in the siege, in the hope this could win over Uthman's Bedouin allies (the Banu Saqr). Jazzar had brough in heavier weapons from Acre but these were insufficient against Deir Hanna's defenses. While his forces captured the village's outer towers, a long and costly stalemate set in. The tide turned in July when Hasan Pasha supplied Jazzar with a heavy cannon and 200 reinforcements. The cannon destroyed large parts of the village walls, prompting Ali to make a bid for peace. He sent Safed's qadi Isma'il Effendi to negotiate with Jazzar, but he was turned away. Jazzar proceeded with the bombardment of Deir Hanna, forcing a negotiated surrender on 22 July. Ali's brother Sa'id, his kethuda (chief aide) Yusuf Dabbur, his garrison commander Muhammad Abu Ghurrah, and his son Fadil were taken into Jazzar's custody. From those captured, Hasan Pasha sent at least Sa'id and Fadil as prisoners to Constantinople, along with Ali's brothers Uthman, Ahmad, Sa'd al-Din and Salih, and several of their children and grandchildren.

Safed and Tiberias surrendered after the fall of Deir Hanna, whose fortifications were demolished. With his headquarters occupied and garrisoned by Jazzar's troops, Ali escaped to Mount Lebanon, initially taking refuge in the Shihab family's fort at Niha. Yusuf Shihab soon after evicted Ali to avoid conflict with Jazzar. Afterward, Ali, learning of Jazzar's return to Acre, resumed operations against him, launching attempts to retake Tiberias and Deir Hanna and attacking villages around Safed. He decisively defeated an army sent against him by Jazzar at Sa'sa'.

The Ottomans were unable to eliminate Ali through conventional means. He had the advantage of mobility and a friendly population in the Galilee's villages, which sustained his revolt. In mid-November 1776, an officer serving Muhammad Pasha of Damascus who had gained entry into Ali's camp struck and killed Ali, sending his head to Constantinople. In the historian Amnon Cohen's words, "With this troublesome thorn [Ali] removed from his side, Jezzār could now breathe far more easily." Ali's assassination marked the end of the Zayadina's power in the Galilee, giving Jazzar full control of the area and allowing him to move against the Metawali chiefs in Jabal Amil.

== Building works ==
Ali restored the Crusader-era Citadel of Safed, though traces of his contributions are difficult to trace due to damages from the 1837 Galilee earthquake, stone theft and tree overgrowth.

Although mid-19th century locals credited Ali's father as the builder of the reservoir (birkeh) of Tabgha off the northern shores of the Sea of Galilee, they referred to it 'Birket Ali al-Daher'. William McClure Thomson suggests the Zayadina restored the reservoir, noting that its lower course of stones were older. The entire structure was built from basalt.

Genealogical tree of the Zayadina

Zaydan
Salih
Ali (fl. 1704 – c. 1723)	Umar (d. 1706)	Hamza (fl. 1708)
Muhammad (d. 1743)	Ayyub	Shammah	Sa'd (d. 1761)	Yusuf (fl. 1761)	Salih (d. 1738)	Daher al-Umar (d. 1775)
Karim (d. 1775)	Nijma	Salibi (d. 1773)	Uthman	Ali (d. 1776)	Sa'id	Ahmad	Abbas (d. 1810)	Sa'd al-Din	Salih (fl. 1775 – c. 1799
Nasir	Abd al-Aziz	Kanj	Jahjah	Fadil Husayn (d. 1810)	Kamil Hasan	Muhammad	Yusuf	As'ad	Husayn (fl. 1850)
Abbas	Ali (fl. 1898–1892)	Kanj (d. 1930)	Daher	Salih	Ahmad

== Bibliography ==
- Cohen, Amnon (1973). Palestine in the 18th Century: Patterns of Government and Administration. Jerusalem: The Magnes Press. ISBN 978-0-19-647903-3.
- Crecelius, Daniel (1981). A Study of the Regimes of 'Ali Bey al-Kabir and Muhammad Bey Abu al-Dhahab, 1760-1775. Minneapolis and Chicago: Bibliotheca Islamica. ISBN 0-88297-029-1.
- Joudah, Ahmad Hasan (2013). Revolt in Palestine in the Eighteenth Century: The Era of Shaykh Zahir al-Umar (Second ed.). Gorgias Press. ISBN 978-1-4632-0002-2.
- Petersen, Andrew (2001). A Gazetteer of Buildings in Muslim Palestine (British Academy Monographs in Archaeology). Oxford University Press. ISBN 978-0-19-727011-0. Archived from the original on 2021-05-28.
- Philipp, Thomas (2001). Acre: The Rise and Fall of a Palestinian City, 1730–1831. Columbia University Press. ISBN 978-0-231-50603-8.
- Rafeq, Abdul-Karim (1966). The Province of Damascus, 1723–1783. Beirut: Khayats.
- Thomson, W. M. (1882). The Land and the Book: Central Palestine and Phoenicia (Popular ed.). New York: Harper and Brothers.
