= Umar al-Zaydani =

Multazim of Safed
- In office c. 1700–1706
- Preceded by: Mansur Shihab
- Succeeded by: Muhammad Nafi'

Personal details
- Died: 1706 Galilee (Safed Sanjak), Sidon Eyalet, Ottoman Empire
- Spouse: Woman of the Sardiyya tribe
- Children: Sa'd; Salih; Yusuf; Daher; Shammah (daughter)
- Parent: Salih al-Zaydani (father)
- Relatives: Zayadina (family); Ali (brother); Hamza (brother)

Umar al-Zaydani (died 1706) was the paramount sheikh of the Zayadina, an Arab tribal family influential in the Galilee throughout the 18th century, and the multazim (tax farmer) of the Safed area from c. 1700 until his death. The paramount emir of the Druze, Bashir Shihab I, granted Umar the tax farm due to his and the Zayadina's well-established influence in the Galilee and their shared factional affiliation with the Shihabs. Umar's eldest son Sa'd al-Umar succeeded him as head of the family, but his youngest son, Daher al-Umar eventually superseded him and brought the Zayadina to the peak of their power as the strongman of northern Palestine between the 1730s/1740s and 1775.

== Life ==
Umar was a sheikh of the Zayadina, a family of Bedouin origin which had settled as cultivators in the Galilee in the 17th century. Umar's father, Salih, was also a sheikh. In 1703, Umar was referred to in a French consular source as grand chek de ce pays ("paramount sheikh of the country [the Galilee]"). The historian Amnon Cohen suggests this reflected an official title held by Umar (shaykh al-mashayikh), which was later held by his son Daher al-Umar (and offered at one point to each of his grandsons Uthman al-Daher and Ali al-Daher in 1775 and 1776, respectively). Around the same time, Umar's brothers, over whom he was paramount, Ali and Hamza were the leading sheikhs in the Shefa-Amr and Nazareth areas, respectively. (Note: Ali is mentioned as a sheikh of Shefa-Amr, and its dependent villages of Tamra and I'billin in 1704, while Hamza is mentioned in a similar capacity in the Nazareth area in 1708.)

According to the 19th-century Lebanese chronicles of Haydar Ahmad al-Shihabi and Tannus al-Shidyaq, in c. 1700, Arslan Matarci Pasha, the Ottoman governor of Sidon Eyalet, a province spanning Beirut, Sidon and Acre and their respective hinterlands, southern Mount Lebanon, Jabal Amil and the Galilee, tasked the emir of the Druze, Bashir Shihab I, to suppress a rebellion by the Metawali (local Twelver Shia Muslim) clan, the Ali al-Saghirs. After Bashir defeated the rebels, Arslan Pasha awarded him the iltizam (tax farms) of the Metawali subdistricts, as well as the Safed area. Bashir appointed his nephew Mansur as his deputy governor over Safed Sanjak, the district spanning the Galilee and Jabal Amil, and the Shihabs subcontracted the iltizam of Safed and its dependencies to Umar. Umar was likely chosen because he was already well-established in that area and, as a Qaysi, belonged to the same tribal-political faction as Bashir (see Qays–Yaman rivalry). The Metawalis and the deposed sheikh of Bilad Safad belonged to the opposing Yamani faction and Bashir had been determined to eliminate Yamani influence in the region. Umar was effectively charged with collecting the taxes from his subdistrict and forwarding them to the governor of Sidon. When Mansur died in 1701 or 1702, Bashir replaced him with Umar.

Umar died in 1706, after which he was succeeded by his eldest son Sa'd al-Umar as the paramount sheikh of the Zayadina. With Bashir's death in 1707, the governor of Sidon, Bashir Matarci Pasha, likely dismissed the Zayadina from their iltizam as part of his drive to reassert direct government authority in the province by curtailing the power of the Shihab emirs. When Bashir Shihab's successor, Haydar Shihab, routed his Yamani Druze opponents at the Battle of Ain Dara in 1711, he restored the Zayadina to their various iltizam.

Genealogical tree of the Zayadina

Zaydan
Salih
Ali (fl. 1704 – c. 1723)	Umar (d. 1706)	Hamza (fl. 1708)
Muhammad (d. 1743)	Ayyub	Shammah	Sa'd (d. 1761)	Yusuf (fl. 1761)	Salih (d. 1738)	Daher al-Umar (d. 1775)
Karim (d. 1775)	Nijma	Salibi (d. 1773)	Uthman	Ali (d. 1776)	Sa'id	Ahmad	Abbas (d. 1810)	Sa'd al-Din	Salih (fl. 1775 – c. 1799
Nasir	Abd al-Aziz	Kanj	Jahjah	Fadil Husayn (d. 1810)	Kamil Hasan	Muhammad	Yusuf	As'ad	Husayn (fl. 1850)
Abbas	Ali (fl. 1898–1892)	Kanj (d. 1930)	Daher	Salih	Ahmad

== Bibliography ==
- Cohen, Amnon (1973). Palestine in the 18th Century: Patterns of Government and Administration. Jerusalem: The Magnes Press. ISBN 978-0-19-647903-3.
- Harris, W. (2012). Lebanon: A History, 600–2011. New York: Oxford University Press. ISBN 978-0-19-518111-1.
- Joudah, Ahmad Hasan (2013). Revolt in Palestine in the Eighteenth Century: The Era of Shaykh Zahir al-Umar (Second ed.). Piscataway, New Jersey: Gorgias Press. ISBN 978-1-4632-0002-2.
- Philipp, T. (2001). Acre: The Rise and Fall of a Palestinian City, 1730–1831. Columbia University Press. ISBN 978-0-231-50603-8.
- Rafeq, A.-K. (1966). The Province of Damascus, 1723–1783. Beirut: Khayats. OCLC 26512897.
