= Salibi al-Daher =

Subgovernor of Tiberias
- In office Late 1740s/early 1750s – 1773
- Preceded by: Daher al-Umar
- Succeeded by: Ahmad al-Daher

Personal details
- Died: 1773 al-Salihiyah, Egypt, Ottoman Empire
- Children: Nasir
- Relatives: Zayadina (clan); Ali al-Daher (brother)

Salibi al-Daher (transliterated Ṣalībī al-Ḍāhir; given name also transliterated Sulaybi or Celebi) (died 1773) was the eldest son of Daher al-Umar, the Arab strongman over northern Palestine during Ottoman rule in the mid-18th century. He served as his father's deputy or administrator over Tiberias. He was known to be Daher's most loyal son, his younger brothers having launched repeated rebellions against their father. He died supporting Ali Bey al-Kabir's abortive campaign to restore power over Egypt in 1773.

== Life ==
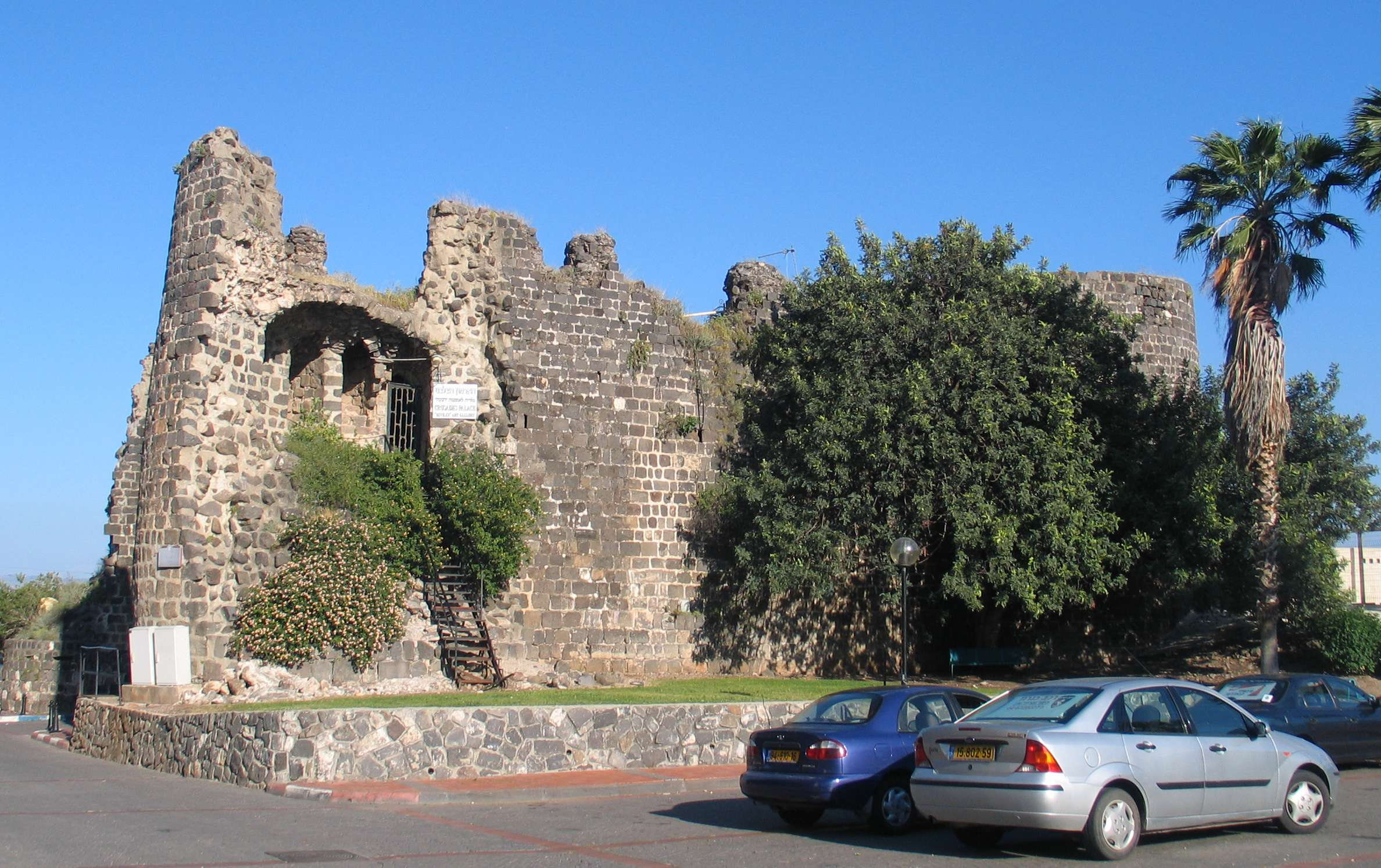
Remains of the citadel at Tiberias, built by Salibi

Salibi was the eldest son of Daher al-Umar, the paramount sheikh of the Zayadina family, multazim (tax farmer), and strongman of northern Palestine from 1730 until his death in 1775. In Daher's gradual takeover of the region, the first place he captured was Tiberias, which he fortified and made his headquarters. From there, Daher expanded his realm across the Galilee throughout the 1730s and 1740s. He survived two sieges of Tiberias by the governor of Damascus, Sulayman Pasha al-Azm, in 1742 and 1743. Not long after, he relocated to Deir Hanna and by 1750 established his headquarters in Acre. Daher appointed Salibi as his deputy governor over Tiberias. As with his brothers and uncles who were appointed over different towns and villages, Salibi built up the fortifications of Tiberias, specifically its four-tower citadel. The citadel, built in 1754 and which is partly ruined today, was attached to the northern walls of Tiberias and contained Salibi's residence.

In 1765, Daher's second eldest son, Uthman, launched a rebellion against his father, attracting the support of Daher's other sons Ahmad and Sa'id. After the three brothers were driven out of the Shefa-Amr area, they took refuge with Salibi in Tiberias and requested that he intercede with their father. Daher refused to accommodate their demands, prompting Salibi to join the rebellion. The brothers gained the support of the Bedouin Banu Saqr tribe, but they were soon after paid off by Daher, leaving the brothers without support and suing for peace. In 1767, Salibi was persuaded by another of his brothers, Ali, to join a new rebellion against their father, but this too was suppressed by Daher.

When Daher's ally, Ali Bey al-Kabir, the deposed mamluk strongman of Egypt, raised an army to wrest back control of Egypt from his rival Abu al-Dhahab, Daher sent Salibi to join him at the head of some 500 horsemen. When the armies of Ali Bey and Abu al-Dhahab met at al-Salihiyah near the Nile Delta, Salibi was slain and Abu al-Dhahab defeated and captured Ali Bey. Daher was distressed by the death of his son and upon hearing the news, he collapsed to the ground and exclaimed "From this day I am undone". According to historian Amnon Cohen, Salibi "was no great shakes as a warrior", in contrast to the proven military prowess of his brother Ali. Salibi, Uthman and Ali, the three eldest of Daher's sons, had all viewed themselves as Daher's natural successor and vied to position themselves for this role as Daher entered old age in the 1760s. With Salibi's death, the rivalry intensified between Ali and Uthman into the early 1770s and after Daher's death in 1775. Salibi's brother Ahmad eventually succeeded him as the administrator of Tiberias.

Genealogical tree of the Zayadina

Zaydan
Salih
Ali (fl. 1704 – c. 1723)	Umar (d. 1706)	Hamza (fl. 1708)
Muhammad (d. 1743)	Ayyub	Shammah	Sa'd (d. 1761)	Yusuf (fl. 1761)	Salih (d. 1738)	Daher al-Umar (d. 1775)
Karim (d. 1775)	Nijma	Salibi (d. 1773)	Uthman	Ali (d. 1776)	Sa'id	Ahmad	Abbas (d. 1810)	Sa'd al-Din	Salih (fl. 1775 – c. 1799
Nasir	Abd al-Aziz	Kanj	Jahjah	Fadil Husayn (d. 1810)	Kamil Hasan	Muhammad	Yusuf	As'ad	Husayn (fl. 1850)
Abbas	Ali (fl. 1898–1892)	Kanj (d. 1930)	Daher	Salih	Ahmad

== Bibliography ==
- Cohen, Amnon (1973). Palestine in the 18th Century: Patterns of Government and Administration. Jerusalem: The Magnes Press. ISBN 978-0-19-647903-3.
- Crecelius, Daniel (1981). A Study of the Regimes of 'Ali Bey al-Kabir and Muhammad Bey Abu al-Dhahab, 1760-1775. Minneapolis and Chicago: Bibliotheca Islamica. ISBN 0-88297-029-1.
- Joudah, Ahmad Hasan (2013). Revolt in Palestine in the Eighteenth Century: The Era of Shaykh Zahir al-Umar (Second ed.). Piscataway, New Jersey: Gorgias Press. ISBN 978-1-4632-0002-2.
- Philipp, T. (2001). Acre: The Rise and Fall of a Palestinian City, 1730–1831. Columbia University Press. ISBN 978-0-231-50603-8.
- Pringle, D.; Petersen, Andrew; Dow, Martin; Singer, Caroline (1994). "Qalʿat Jiddin: A Castle of the Crusader and Ottoman Periods in Galilee". Levant. 2: 135–166.
- Pringle, D. (1998). The Churches of the Crusader Kingdom of Jerusalem: A Corpus: Volume 2, L–Z (excluding Tyre). Cambridge University Press. ISBN 978-0-521-39037-8.
- Sabbagh, K. (2008). Palestine: History of a Lost Nation. Grove/Atlantic, Inc. ISBN 9781555848743.
