= Siege of Tiberias =

Siege of Tiberias may refer to:

- Siege of Tiberias (1187), during the Battle of Hattin
- Sieges of Tiberias (1742–1743) by the Ottoman governor of Damascus against the tax farmer Zahir al-Umar
