= Mamluks in the Ottoman Empire =

Slave-soldiers in Ottoman Egypt and Iraq

Mamluks in the Ottoman Empire were slave-soldiers who governed localities within the Ottoman Empire, particularly in Egypt and Iraq.

Following the Ottoman conquest of the Mamluk Sultanate, the Ottomans retained mamluks in positions of power as tax collectors, military leaders, and governors, especially under the iltizam system employed in Egypt.

The Mamluk system in Ottoman Egypt was transformed such that sons of mamluks were completely allowed to serve in elite military and government positions, which introduced feuds between various Mamluk houses into local governance. The history of the Mamluks in Egypt faced "an apocalyptic end" in 1811.

== Bibliography ==
- Marozzi, Justin (10 July 2025). Captives and Companions: A History of Slavery and the Slave Trade in the Islamic World. Penguin Books Limited. ISBN 9780141997667.
- Saad, Mohamed (6 February 2025). Mamluks and Generals: A Study on the Genealogy of Military Rule in Egypt. Ethics International Press Limited. ISBN 9781837111312.
