= Enderûnlu Fâzıl =

Ottoman poet (1757–1810)

Enderûnlu Fâzıl (1757–1810) was an Ottoman poet. He is the author of the Zenanname ("The Book of Women") and the Hubanname ("The book of Beautiful Young Men"), the former of which was banned in the Ottoman Empire. He achieved fame through his erotic works.

== Life ==
Fâzıl (or Fadil in Arabic) was born with the name 'Husayn' in c. 1757. His birthplace was either Acre or Safed, Acre being the headquarters of his grandfather, the Arab strongman and tax farmer Sheikh Daher al-Umar, and Safed being the headquarters of his father Ali al-Daher. Daher presided over a domain spanning northern Palestine and the Syrian coast from Jaffa to Sidon before his elimination in an Ottoman imperial assault in 1775. The Ottomans appointed Ahmad Pasha al-Jazzar over Acre province and Fazil's father Ali led a rebellion by their family, the Zayadina, which still controlled Acre's Galilee countryside and attempted to oust the governor. The Zayadina made their last stand in their fortified stronghold of Deir Hanna, which capitulated in July 1776. Fazil, his brother Hasan Kamil, and their uncle Sa'id were among those in Deir Hanna who consequently entered the custody of Jazzar, who transferred them to the imperial admiral Hasan Pasha al-Jaza'iri. Hasan Pasha took the Zaydani prisoners to the imperial capital Constantinople. Fazil's father continued his rebellion until his assassination in November 1776.

In Constantinople, he was admitted to the Hazin-i Humayun palace school of Enderun, hence his nickname Enderuni or Enderûnlu. He was expelled in 1783, "possibly because of love affairs that had gone wrong", according to historian Michael Erdman. He spent the next several years living in poverty on the streets of Constantinople.

In the mid-1790s, Sultan Selim III made Fazil a bey and appointed him as a waqf administrator in Rhodes, Aleppo and Erzerum. Significant debts compelled him to return to Constantinople from Erzerum. In 1799 he was exiled to Rhodes because of his satirical writings. He became blind there, reportedly due to the shock of the Reis ul-Kuttab Ebubekir Ratib Effendi's execution. He afterward was allowed to return to Constantinople. Despite his blindness, he spent the remainder of his life providing poetry to the Ottoman imperial elite. He died in 1810 and is buried in a tomb in Eyüp.

Genealogical tree of the Zayadina

Zaydan
Salih
Ali (fl. 1704 – c. 1723)	Umar (d. 1706)	Hamza (fl. 1708)
Muhammad (d. 1743)	Ayyub	Shammah	Sa'd (d. 1761)	Yusuf (fl. 1761)	Salih (d. 1738)	Daher al-Umar (d. 1775)
Karim (d. 1775)	Nijma	Salibi (d. 1773)	Uthman	Ali (d. 1776)	Sa'id	Ahmad	Abbas (d. 1810)	Sa'd al-Din	Salih (fl. 1775 – c. 1799
Nasir	Abd al-Aziz	Kanj	Jahjah	Fadil Husayn (d. 1810)	Kamil Hasan	Muhammad	Yusuf	As'ad	Husayn (fl. 1850)
Abbas	Ali (fl. 1898–1892)	Kanj (d. 1930)	Daher	Salih	Ahmad

== Works ==
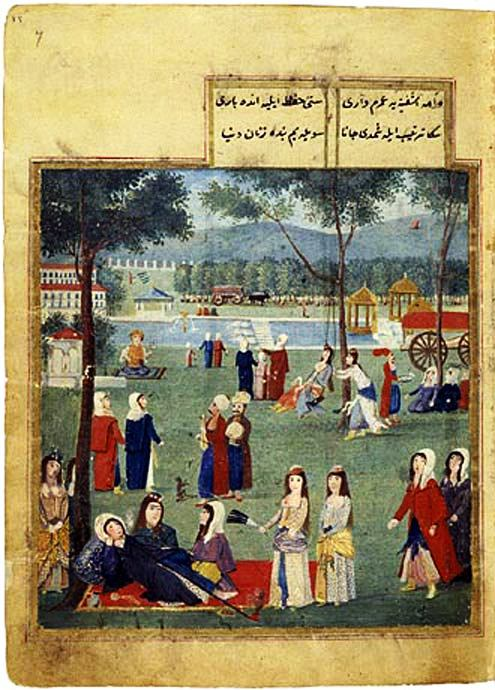
The first book banned during the Ottoman Empire The Book of Women.

- Divan
- The Book of Love
- The Book of the Beautiful Young Men
- Zenanname, The Book of Women
- The Book of the Dancers

== Bibliography ==
- Arslan, Mehmet (2024). "Ön Söz (Foreword)". In Arslan, Mehmet (ed.). Enderunlu Fâzıl'ın Bütün Eserleri (All Works of Enderunlu Fazıl) (in Turkish). Istanbul: Dün Bugün Yarın. pp. 9–10. ISBN 978-625-6063-59-4.
- Cohen, Amnon (1973). Palestine in the 18th Century: Patterns of Government and Administration. Jerusalem: The Magnes Press. ISBN 978-0-19-647903-3.
- Erdman, Michael (2024). "Fair Boys and Wicked Ladies: Peoples of the Balkans in the Works of Enderunlu Fazil Bey". In Todd, Ines Ascarik; Smajic, Aid (eds.). Travellers in Ottoman Lands II The Balkans, Anatolia and Beyond. Archaeopress. pp. 266–298. ISBN 9781803278605.
- Mordtmann, JH. Bey "Fadil Bey (search results)". In Fleet, Kate; Krämer, Gudrun; Matringe, Denis; Nawas, John; Rowson, Everett (eds.). Encyclopaedia of Islam (3rd ed.). Brill Online. p. 727. ISSN 1873-9830.
- Enderunlu Fazil. In: Türkiye Diyanet Vakfi Ansiklopedisi Islam. 11 TDV Yayını, Istanbul 1995 (in Turkish)
