= Ahmad al-Daher =

Ahmad al-Daher al-Zaydani was the governor of Jabal Ajlun in c. 1770–1775 under his father, Daher al-Umar, the Acre-based multazim (tax farmer) and strongman of northern Palestine.

== Life ==
Ahmad was one of the eight known sons of Daher al-Umar, the paramount sheikh of the Zayadina tribe, Ottoman multazim) (tax farmer) of Acre, and strongman of northern Palestine. Daher initially appointed Ahmad as his deputy governor over Saffuriya.

He had the same mother as Daher's sons Uthman and Sa'd al-Din. In 1765, he was reported to have joined Uthman and Sa'd al-Din in a rebellion against their father for his refusal to hand over control of Shefa-Amr to Uthman, who was promised the town in return for helping with the assassination of Daher's eldest brother Sa'd al-Umar. They were defeated by Daher's forces on that occasion; Uthman renewed his rebellion in May 1766, and he was ultimately handed control of Shefa-Amr. Sa'd had been the Zayadina's sheikh over the foritified village of Deir Hanna and after his death, Ahmad was installed there by Daher.

In the late 1760s, Deir Hanna was handed over to Ahmad's half-brother Ali al-Daher. During Daher's campaign against Damascus governor in late 1770–early 1771, Ahmad launched raids against the Hauran and Jabal Ajlun with the key backing of the Bedouins of the Arab al-Subayh tribe. Ahmad captured Irbid in Jabal Ajlun. According to Frederick Peake, Ahmad took over the Kura district of Jabal Ajlun and entered its chief village, Tibneh. The tribes in the area had been at war among themselves, enabling Ahmad to capture the area without resistance. He ousted the local governor, who had been appointed by the governor of Damascus. Ahmad built a small fort in the village, which was still standing in the 1930s. Ahmad's rule was officially recognized by the governor of Damascus, Muhammad Pasha al-Azm, as a conciliative gesture to Daher in 1774 when the sides were negotiating an end to their conflict.

Ahmad was the chief rival to Ali al-Daher among Daher's sons. In the summer of 1774, Ahmad supported his father's push against Ali, who had launched a rebellion against Daher, and the two sides clashed at the village of Rameh on 11 July. Ahmad held command of his forces but was shot in the thigh by Ali, causing Ahmad and Daher to retreat to Deir Hanna. Daher was killed in an Ottoman campaign against his headquarters in Acre in 1775. The Ottomans appointed Ahmad Pasha al-Jazzar as the governor of Sidon with his headquarters in Acre and Jazzar's initial priority was subduing the Zayadina, who dominated Acre's countryside. In a bid to stir division within the Zayadina, Jazzar recognized the authority of Uthman and Ahmad in Shefa-Amr and the Tiberias area, respectively. Jazzar besieged Deir Hanna, the principal fortress of the Zayadina, in June 1776, during which he offered Ahmad clemency should he pay allegiance to the Ottomans and Ahmad appears to have shortly after entered Jazzar's custody, along with his brothers Sa'id and Uthman.

With the fall of Deir Hanna, Ahmad was sent to the imperial capital Constantinople with most of his surviving brothers. He went on to have a career in Ottoman service. His son Yusuf became a senior employee of the government's translation office.

Genealogical tree of the Zayadina

Zaydan
Salih
Ali (fl. 1704 – c. 1723)	Umar (d. 1706)	Hamza (fl. 1708)
Muhammad (d. 1743)	Ayyub	Shammah	Sa'd (d. 1761)	Yusuf (fl. 1761)	Salih (d. 1738)	Daher al-Umar (d. 1775)
Karim (d. 1775)	Nijma	Salibi (d. 1773)	Uthman	Ali (d. 1776)	Sa'id	Ahmad	Abbas (d. 1810)	Sa'd al-Din	Salih (fl. 1775 – c. 1799
Nasir	Abd al-Aziz	Kanj	Jahjah	Fadil Husayn (d. 1810)	Kamil Hasan	Muhammad	Yusuf	As'ad	Husayn (fl. 1850)
Abbas	Ali (fl. 1898–1892)	Kanj (d. 1930)	Daher	Salih	Ahmad

== Bibliography ==
- Cohen, Amnon (1973). Palestine in the 18th Century: Patterns of Government and Administration. Jerusalem: The Magnes Press. ISBN 978-0-19-647903-3.
- Joudah, Ahmad Hasan (1987). Revolt in Palestine in the Eighteenth Century: The Era of Shaykh Zahir al-'Umar. Kingston Press. ISBN 978-0-940670-11-2.
- Joudah, Ahmad Hasan (2013). Revolt in Palestine in the Eighteenth Century: The Era of Shaykh Zahir al-Umar (Second ed.). Piscataway, New Jersey: Gorgias Press. ISBN 978-1-4632-0002-2.
- Peake, Frederick Gerard (1934). A History of Trans-Jordan and its Tribes, Vol. 2. Amman.
- Philipp, T. (2001). Acre: The Rise and Fall of a Palestinian City, 1730–1831. Columbia University Press. ISBN 978-0-231-50603-8.
- Rafeq, A.-K. (1966). The Province of Damascus, 1723–1783. Beirut: Khayats. OCLC 26512897.
