= Nínawa Daher =

Argentine lawyer, journalist, and TV show host

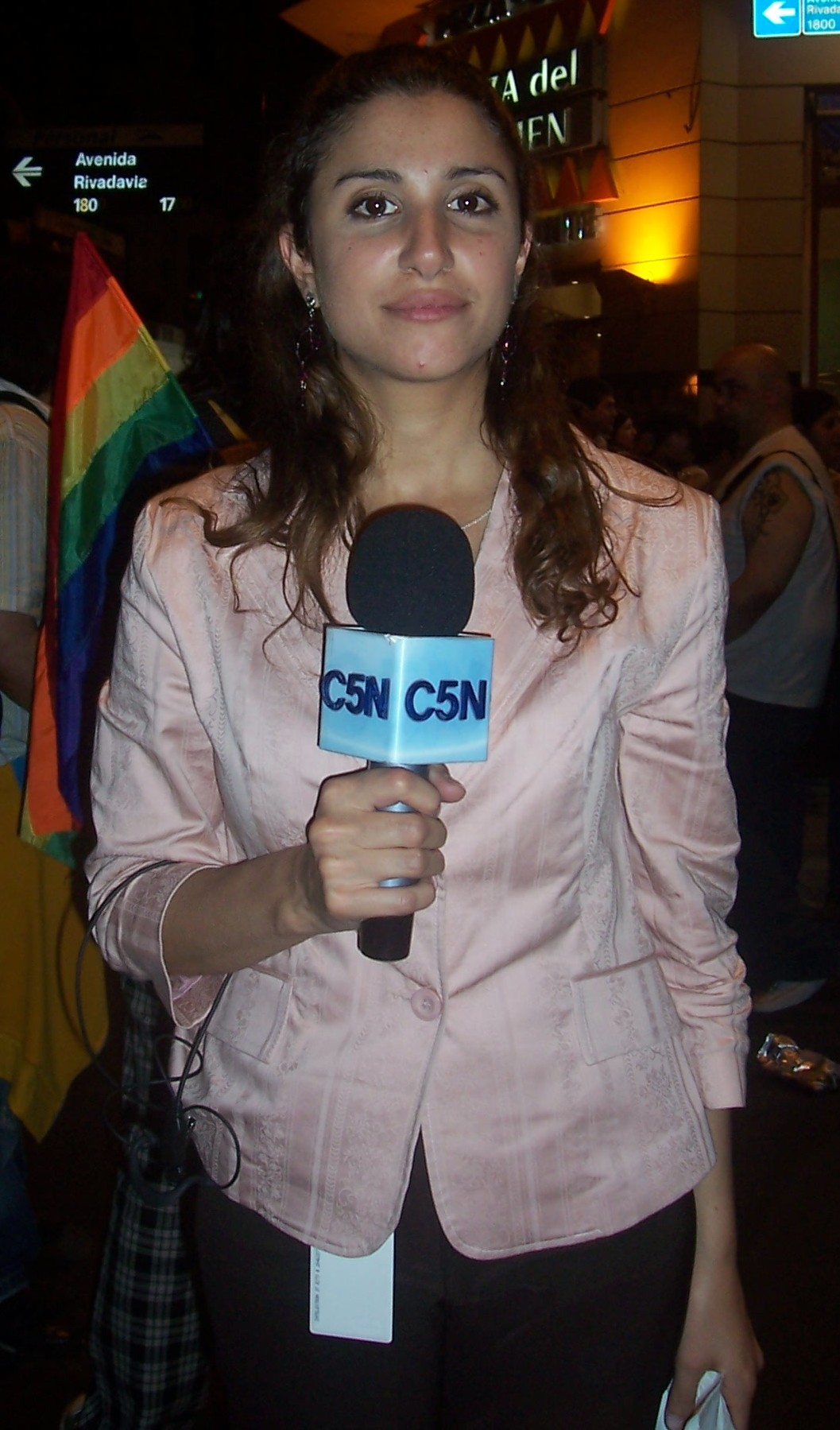
- Born: 3 October 1979; Buenos Aires, Argentina
- Died: 9 January 2011 (aged 31); Buenos Aires, Argentina
- Education: University of Buenos Aires
- Occupations: Lawyer, journalist, presenter
- Awards: Santa Clara de Asís Award (2011)

Nínawa Daher (3 October 1979 – 9 January 2011) was an Argentine lawyer, journalist, and television host.

== Early years ==
Nínawa Daher was born in Buenos Aires on 3 October 1979, into a family of Lebanese descent. Her parents were Ghandour and Alicia Daher, and she had a sister, Sumaia.

== Academic career ==
Daher graduated from Nuestra Señora del Huerto High School in 1997. She earned a law degree from the University of Buenos Aires in 2003, graduating with honors. In addition to her titles in journalism and law, she spoke English, Arabic, and French fluently.

== Professional career ==
Daher was coordinator of the ADISC and FORO youth programs, and Secretary of Socio-Cultural Development of the Youth Cooperation Board of the City of Buenos Aires. In 2003, she was a candidate for the Buenos Aires City Legislature.

She hosted Televisión Pública Argentina's Desde el aljibe, a program for the Argentine Arab community, since its inception in 2002, along with journalist Roberto Ahuad. She also worked as an international journalist at the Argentine news channel C5N since its creation in 2007. She was sent to cover the presidential tours of Cristina Fernández to Africa in November 2007 and Arab countries in 2010. In 2010 she became the host of Resumen de medianoche, the channel's early morning news program.

== Work with organizations ==
The co-founder of the Youth Group of the Lebanese World Cultural Union in Argentina, Daher was part of its directive commission for several years. She chaired the Youth Group of the Federation of Argentine Arab Entities of Buenos Aires and participated in the Socio Cultural Forum of Buenos Aires. She was co-founder of the Catholic journalist's group "People of the Road Press". She received the 2006 Ugarit Distinction for Youth Insight, as well as the 2009 Golden Lighthouse Award for Journalistic Discovery on TV in Mar del Plata. During the course of her life she participated in various activities in solidarity with vulnerable social groups, and in pursuit of improving quality of life for Argentine youth. She was Godmother of the Children's Board, collaborated with SOS Children's Villages, Dining Rooms for Children and the Elderly, and volunteered with the International Make-A-Wish Foundation.

== Death ==
On the night of 9 January 2011, Nínawa Daher died in a traffic accident while on vacation in the Retiro neighborhood of Buenos Aires. She was accompanied by her boyfriend Alejandro Tomás Macipe, who was driving the vehicle. Macipe was detained and charged with wrongful death, but was released on 11 January.

On 27 August, the government of the city of Buenos Aires placed a star at the scene of the accident. The memorial was attended by Guillermo Montenegro, Gabriela Michetti, and Daniel Hadad.

== Awards and recognitions ==
- 2006 – Ugarit Distinction for Youth Insight
- 2009 – Golden Lighthouse for TV Journalism

=== Posthumous honors ===
- 2011 – memorial mention at the Martín Fierro Awards
- 2011 – Santa Clara de Asís Award for her professional career
- 2011 – plaque in her memory placed in the Plaza of Journalists by the government of Buenos Aires
- 2011 – Buenos Aires Law No. 3.939 designated Daher's birthday of 3 October as Arab-Argentine Youth Day
- 2012 – annual scholarship established for a Master's in Investigative Journalism from the Universidad del Salvador
- 2012 – named an Ambassador of Peace by the Peace Foundation and Thousand Millennia of Peace
- 2014 – granted the Presidential Shield of Lebanon by Michel Suleiman
