= Sami Daher =

Lebanese actor and voice actor

- سامي ضاهر
- Born: 1968 (age 57–58)
- Occupations: Actor, voice actor

Sami Daher (Arabic: سامي ضاهر) is a Lebanese actor and voice actor. He was born on 24 January 1968 in Beirut, Lebanon and started acting in 1994.

== Filmography ==
=== Plays ===
- Waylon Le Omma. 2013

=== Dubbing roles ===
- Batman: The Animated Series - Harvey Bullock, Penguin, Kyodai Ken (Lebanese dubbing version)
- Kung Fu Panda, Monkey.
- The Fairly OddParents, Cosmo.
- Ben 10: Omniverse - Argit (second voice)
- Bolt (uncredited; Classical Arabic version)
- Courage the Cowardly Dog
- Mokhtarnameh
- Prophet Joseph
- Hussein Who Said No (Iranian film)
