= Thomas Philipp =

Thomas Philipp (11 May 1941 in Königsberg; † 11 June 2015 in Erlangen) was a German historian that focused on the research of medieval and modern history and political history of Near and Middle East, Ottoman Empire and the Arab world. He is considered a prominent historian in his respective field of historiography in German language.

== Biography ==
After his expulsion from East Prussia, Philipp studied at the Free University of Berlin from 1962 and moved to the Hebrew University of Jerusalem in 1963. He received his doctorate from the University of California, Los Angeles in 1971 with a thesis on Arab nationalism.

In 1988, Philipp was appointed professor of politics and contemporary history of the Near and Middle East at the Institute for Political Science at the Friedrich-Alexander University Erlangen-Nuremberg. He retired on February 1, 2009.

Philipp died at the age of 74 in 2015 after a long illness.

== Publications ==
- Gurgī Zaidān, his life and thought. Beirut 1979. ISBN 978-3-515-01842-5.
- Class, Community, and Arab Historiography in the Early Nineteenth Century: The Dawn of a New Era, International Journal of Middle East Studies, May 1984.
- The Syrians in Egypt: 1725–1975. Stuttgart 1985. ISBN 978-3-515-04031-0.
- Acre: The Rise and Fall of a Palestinian City, 1730-1831. Columbia University Press, 2002. ISBN 9780231506038

as editor

- The Syrian land in the 18th and 19th century: the common and the specific in the historical experience. Stuttgart 1992. ISBN 978-3-515-05685-4.
- The Syrian land: processes of integration and fragmentation; Bilād Al-Shām from the 18th to the 20th century. Stuttgart 1998. ISBN 978-3-515-07309-7.
- From the Syrian land to the states of Syria and Lebanon. Würzburg 2004. ISBN 978-3-89913-353-0.
