= Iltizam =

Ottoman tax farming system

An iltizam (Arabic: التزام, romanized: iltizām) was a form of tax farm that appeared in the 15th century in the Ottoman Empire. The system began under Mehmed the Conqueror and was abolished during the Tanzimat reforms in 1856.

Iltizams were sold off by the government to wealthy notables, who would then reap up to five times the amount they had paid by taxing the peasants and extracting agricultural production. It was a system that was very profitable and was of great benefit to the Egyptian aristocracy under the Mamluks, and helped create a large and powerful elite. In Egypt, it was abolished by Muhammad Ali as part of his centralization efforts in the early nineteenth century. After confiscating the iltizam lands of the ulema, Muhammad Ali imposed a tax on their significant (and previously tax-exempt) waqf revenues.

The holder of an iltizam was a mültezim (Ottoman Turkish: ملتزم).

An iltizam was typically an annual agreement. The malikâne (Ottoman Turkish: مالكانه) system, developed as a replacement for iltizam, was for life.
