= Ibrahim Pasha al-Azm =

Ottoman statesman

Ibrahim Pasha al-Azm (died 1746) was the Ottoman governor of Tripoli in 1728–1730 and Sidon in 1737–1741 and 1742–1744.

== Career ==
=== Governor of Tripoli ===
Ibrahim was a son of Ismail Pasha al-Azm, the founder of the Azm family's political prominence and beylerbey (provincial governor) of Damascus in 1725. Ibrahim was appointed by the Ottoman imperial government as governor of Tripoli, while his father served in Damascus and his uncle, Sulayman Pasha al-Azm, governed Sidon. Sulayman was Ibrahim's predecessor in Tripoli, and his father had held the post before his appointment to Damascus. Ibrahim appointed his son, Yasin Bey, as the sanjakbey (district governor) of Latakia.

Ibrahim established monopolies in the province which caused significant rises in the prices of commodities. Ibrahim was overthrown by a mass uprising of the armies, including the janissaries, and residents of Tripoli, who viewed his rule as oppressive. The revolt coincided with the overthrow of the Azms' patron, Sultan Ahmed III, and led to the temporary deposition of the other Azm governors in Ottoman Syria.

=== Governor of Sidon ===
Ibrahim was appointed the governor of Sidon in 1737, succeeding his relative Sa'd al-Din Pasha al-Azm. According to the historian Shimon Shamir, his "abuses and inefficiency brought [the province] to the brink of bankruptcy". In November 1741, he was dismissed and replaced with his brother As'ad Pasha al-Azm, who settled the debts left by Ibrahim with the French merchants of Sidon and mediated an end to the conflict between the Druze emirs instigated by Ibrahim. As'ad resigned in 1742, and after a brief stint by Ya'qub Agha, Ibrahim was reappointed to Sidon that same year and served until 1744, when he was replaced by Sa'd al-Din. He died in 1746.

== Bibliography ==
- Elisséeff, N. (1986). "Lādhikhiyya". In Bosworth, C. E.; van Donzel, E.; Lewis, B. & Pellat, Ch. (eds.). The Encyclopaedia of Islam, Second Edition. Volume V: Khe–Mahi. Leiden: E. J. Brill. pp. 589–593. ISBN 978-90-04-07819-2.
- Harris, William (2012). Lebanon: A History, 600–2011. Oxford University Press. ISBN 9780195181111.
- Joudah, Ahmad Hasan (2013). Revolt in Palestine in the Eighteenth Century: The Era of Shaykh Zahir al-Umar (Second ed.). Gorgias Press. ISBN 978-1-4632-0002-2.
- van Leeuwen, Richard (1994). Notables and Clergy in Mount Lebanon: The Khāzin Sheikhs and the Maronite Church, 1736–1840. Leiden, New York and Koln: Brill. ISBN 90-04-09978-6.
- Rafeq, Abdul Karim (1966). The Province of Damascus, 1723–1783. Beirut: Khayats.
- Reilly, James A. (2002). A Small Town in Syria: Ottoman Hama in the Eighteenth and Nineteenth Centuries. Peter Lang.
- Shamir, Shimon (1963). "As'ad Pasha al-'Aẓm and Ottoman Rule in Damascus (1743–58)". Bulletin of the School of Oriental and African Studies. 26 (1): 1–28. JSTOR 611304.
