= Amir al-Hajj =

Islamic title for pilgrimage leader

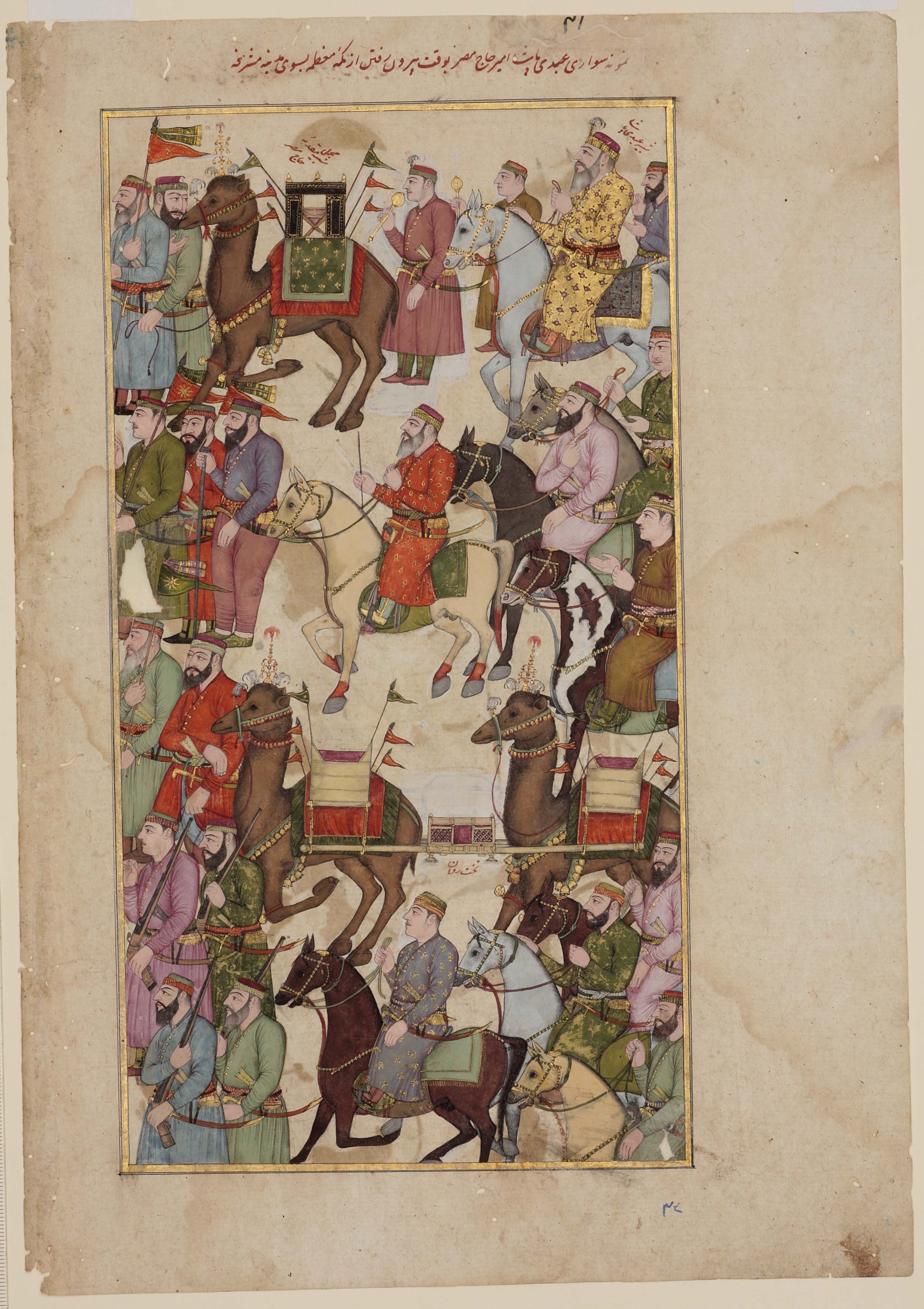
Depiction of the Egyptian amir al-hajj leading the Hajj caravan from Mecca to Medina. From a manuscript of the Anis Al-Hujjaj (Pilgrim's Companion), circa 1677–1680

The Amir al-Hajj (Arabic: أمير الحج, romanized: amīr al-ḥajj, lit. 'commander of the pilgrimage' or Arabic: أمير الحج, romanized: amīr al-ḥājj, lit. 'commander of the pilgrim'; plural: Arabic: أمراء الحج, romanized: umarāʾ al-ḥajj) is the position and title given to the leader (or commander) of the annual Hajj pilgrim caravan by successive Muslim empires, from the 7th century until the 20th century and by various modern governments. Since the Abbasid period, there were two main caravans, one departing from Damascus and the other from Cairo. Each of the two annual caravans was assigned an amir al-hajj whose main duties were securing funds and provisions for the caravan, and protecting it along the desert route to the Muslim holy cities of Mecca and Medina in the Hejaz.

== Significance of the office ==
According to historian Thomas Philipp, "the office of amir al-hajj was an extremely important one", which brought with it great political influence and religious prestige. Given the significance of the Hajj pilgrimage in Islam, the protection of the caravan and its pilgrims was a priority for the Muslim rulers responsible. Any mishandling of the caravan or harm done to the pilgrims by Bedouin raiders would often be made known throughout the Muslim world by returning pilgrims. The leader of the Muslim world, or the ruler aspiring to this position, was required to ensure the pilgrimage's safety, and its success or failure significantly reflected on the ruler's prestige. Thus, "talented and successful Hajj commanders were crucial". In Ottoman times, the importance of successful umara al-hajj generally rendered them immune from punitive measures by the Ottoman authorities for abuses they committed elsewhere.

== Duties ==
The main threat to a Hajj caravan was Bedouin raiding. An amir al-hajj would command a large military force to protect the caravan in the event of an attack by local Bedouin, or would pay off the various Bedouin tribes whose territories the caravan had to traverse on the way to the Muslim holy cities in the Hejaz. The procurement of supplies (water and food), and transportation (camels), were also the responsibility of the amir al-hajj, as was securing the funds to finance the pilgrimage. The funds mostly came from province revenues specifically designated for the Hajj. Some funds came from large endowments established by various Mamluk and Ottoman sultans that were mainly meant to ensure the availability of water and supplies in the cities of Mecca and Medina to accommodate incoming pilgrims. The Cairene commander was responsible for the kiswa, which was the black cloth that is annually draped over the Kaaba in Mecca.

According to Singer and Philipp, an amir al-hajj needed to possess logistical capabilities and military skills. To procure supplies and ensure safe transportation for the caravan, the amir al-hajj often maintained a network of connections to various Ottoman officials and local community leaders. An amir al-hajj brought with him an array of officials, including additional mamluk commanders to maintain order and religious functionaries, such as imams, muezzins, qadis, all of whom were typically educated Arabs. Other officials included Arab desert guides, doctors, an official in charge of intestate affairs for pilgrims who died during the pilgrimage, and a muhtasib who was in charge of overseeing financial transactions.

== History ==
=== Early Islamic Era: Rashidun, Umayyad and Abbasid periods ===
An Arabic manuscript by Yahya ibn Mahmud al-Wasiti depicting a Hajj caravan en route to Mecca from the Levant, 1237.

Muslim tradition ascribes the first Hajj caravan to the lifetime of the Islamic prophet Muhammad, who in 630 (AH 9) instructed Abu Bakr to lead 300 pilgrims from Medina to Mecca. With the Muslim conquests, large numbers of pilgrims converged from all the corners of the expanding Muslim world. Under the Abbasids, the tradition began of annual, state-sponsored caravans setting out from Damascus and Cairo, with the pilgrim caravans from remoter regions usually joining them. A third major point of departure was Kufa, where pilgrims from Iraq, Iran, and Central Asia gathered; Damascus gathered pilgrims from the Levant and in later times Anatolia; and Cairo gathered the pilgrims from Egypt, Africa, the Maghreb, and al-Andalus (Spain).

The early Abbasids placed much value on the symbolic importance of the pilgrimage, and in the first century of Abbasid rule members of the ruling dynasty were usually chosen to lead the caravans. Caliph Harun al-Rashid (r. 786–809) led the caravan in person several times. Abbasid caliph al-Mu'tasim and al-Mutawakkil also led Hajj, before accession to the Caliphate.

=== Fatimid, Ayyubid, later Abbasids and Mamluk periods (970s–1517) ===
The specific year when the amir al-hajj office was established is not definitely known, but was likely in 978 CE when al-Aziz (r. 975–996), the Fatimid ruler of Egypt, appointed Badis ibn Ziri to the position. The first amir al-hajj for the Kufa caravan was likely the Seljuk emir Qaymaz, appointed by Seljuk sultan Muhammad II in 1157, and the first likely amir al-hajj for the Damascus caravan was Tughtakin ibn Ayyub, appointed by the Ayyubid sultan Saladin after the reconquest of Jerusalem from the Crusaders in 1187.

With the virtual destruction of the Abbasid Caliphate and its capital Baghdad by the Mongol Empire in 1258, the role of Damascus and Cairo as gathering and departure points for the Hajj caravan was elevated. The Mamluk Sultanate was established two years later. From then on, Damascus served as the main gathering point for pilgrims from the Levant, Anatolia, Mesopotamia and Persia, while Cairo was the marshalling point for pilgrims coming from the Nile Valley, North Africa and Sub-Saharan Africa. According to historian Jane Hathaway, the amir al-hajj assumed its "classical" form under the Mamluks. Despite its importance, however, the Mamluks chose middle-ranking officials to lead the caravans—typically an amir mia muqaddam alf (commander of a thousand soldiers)—occasionally including freeborn Mamluks (awlad al-nas), who were considered of lower status than manumitted Mamluks.

During the Mamluk era, the main pilgrimage caravan left from Cairo. Its amir al-hajj was always appointed by the sultan. The amir al-hajj of Damascus was either appointed by the sultan or his viceroy in Syria. The Damascene commander was generally subordinate to the Cairene commander, normally playing a neutral or supportive role to the latter in meetings or quarrels with the Meccan sharifs or the caravan commanders from what is now Iraq or Yemen. Because the kiswa, the ceremonial covering for the Kaaba, was usually woven in Egypt, it was carried by the Cairo caravan, while the Damascene caravan carried the corresponding covering for Muhammad's tomb in Medina. A few Mamluk sultans made the pilgrimage themselves, but usually their symbolic presence was represented by a mahmal (palanquin), escorted by musicians.

=== Ottoman era ===
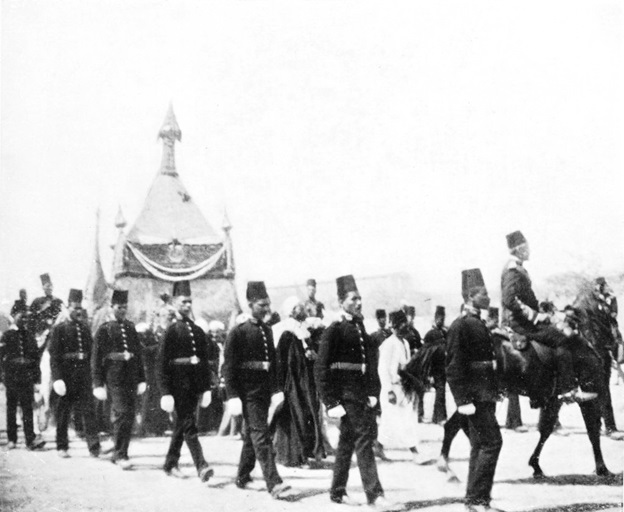
The kiswa being transported from Cairo to Mecca surrounded by an Egyptian armed guard, 1911

The role of amir al-hajj was continued by the Ottoman Empire when they gained control over the Mamluks' territories in 1517. Besides the latter year, during which the Ottoman sultan appointed a bureaucrat to the post, the umara al-hajj from Cairo for much of the 16th century continued to come from the ranks of Circassian Mamluks with occasional appointments of important Arab sheikhs or high-ranking Bosnian or Turkish officials. This was followed by a period where commanders for the Cairene caravan came from Constantinople until the early 18th century when the Mamluks of Egypt once again became the favored appointees for the office.

In the 16th century, the amir al-hajj assigned to the caravan from Damascus commanded 100 sipahi, professional troops who owned fiefs in Damascus Eyalet (Province of Damascus), and janissaries, soldiers from the Damascus garrison. The first amir al-hajj for Damascus was the province's former Mamluk viceroy-turned Ottoman governor, Janbirdi al-Ghazali. Until 1571, the umara al-hajj for Damascus were nominated from the high-ranking mamluks of Damascus, but afterward, mamluks and local leaders from lesser cities and towns such as Gaza, Ajlun, Nablus and al-Karak led the caravan with general success.

In 1708, the Ottoman imperial government adopted a new policy whereby the wali (governor) of Damascus would serve as the amir al-hajj. With this change in policy also came an elevation of the Damascene commander's rank. His rank became superior to that of the Cairene commander, any imperial Ottoman official traveling with the caravan, the Ottoman governor of the Hejaz in Jeddah, and the Meccan sharifs. The Arab al-Azm family of Damascus were able to hold on as governors of Damascus for lengthy periods partly due to their success commanding the caravan.

When the Wahhabis first took control of the Hejaz in the early 19th century, they prohibited the carrying of the mahmal and the musicians, but when Muhammad Ali recovered the area in 1811, they were reinstated. When the Saudis recaptured the Hejaz in 1925, the ban was re-applied. The exclusivity of the amir al-hajj office enjoyed by the governors of Damascus ended at some time in the mid-19th century when the Ottomans regained control of Syria from Muhammad Ali's Egyptian forces. The security threat from Bedouin raiders also decreased during that time. From then on, amir al-hajj became an honorary office typically occupied by a Damascene notable. When the Ottomans lost their nominal authority over Egypt in 1911, the Sultan of Egypt assigned an amir al-hajj by decree on a yearly basis, although by then the importance of the office had receded significantly amid radical political changes occurring in the country.

The dissolution of the Ottoman Empire in the aftermath of World War I signalled an end to the Damascene amir al-hajj. The dynasty of Muhammad Ali in Egypt continued to appoint an amir al-hajj for the Cairo caravan until its fall in 1952. The office was continued by the new republican government for two years, before it was finally abolished.

== List of leaders of the Hajj in the Early Islamic period ==
Under the Umayyad and Abbasid caliphs, leadership of the Hajj was mostly entrusted to a relative of the caliph.

=== Rashidun period (632–661) ===
- Abd al-Rahman ibn Awf, (634)
- Umar al-Farooq, he led Hajj several times during his rule.
- Uthman al-Ghani, led Hajj several times during his rule.
- Abd Allah ibn Abbas, (656)
- Ubayd Allah ibn Abbas, (657, 658)
- Shayba ibn Uthman al-Abdari, (659)

=== Umayyad period (661–750) ===
- Utba ibn Sakhr ibn Harb (662)
- Abu Khalid Yazid, led several times during 670s.
- Hisham ibn Isma'il al-Makhzumi, led the annual Hajj in 703 and 704, and possibly those of 702/3 and 705 as well.
- Umar ibn al-Walid (707)
- Maslama ibn Abd al-Malik
- Abd al-Aziz ibn al-Walid (713)
- Bishr ibn al-Walid (714)
- Umar ibn Abd al-Aziz, also known as Second Umar he led several times during 706 to 712.
- Abd al-Rahman ibn al-Dahhak (720, 721 and 722)
- Maslama ibn Hisham (737)
- Abd al-Wahid ibn Sulayman (747)
- Muhammad ibn Abd al-Malik (He led the Hajj pilgrimage in Mecca in August 748).

=== Abbasid period (750–940) ===
- Dawud ibn Ali al-Hashimi (750)
- Sulayman ibn Ali al-Hashimi (753)
- Al-Fadl ibn Salih (755)
- Muhammad ibn Abdallah al-Mansur (770), the future Abbasid caliph al-Mahdi.
- Sulayman ibn Abdallah al-Mansur (785, 793)
- Musa ibn Isa ibn Musa al-Hashimi (797, 798)
- Abu Ja'far Harun ibn Muhammad al-Mahdi famously known as Harun al-Rashid he led the Hajj pilgrimage several times.
- Al-Abbas ibn Musa ibn Isa al-Hashimi (805, 812, 813, 814).
- Abu Ishaq Muhammad ibn Harun (816), future Abbasid caliph al-Mu'tasim.
- Ishaq ibn Musa ibn Isa al-Hashimi (817)
- Ibrahim ibn Musa ibn Jaʿfar al-Husayni al-Hashimi (818)
- Abdallah ibn Ubaydallah ibn al-Abbas was also a leader of the pilgrimage, having led the annual events of 828, 829, 831, and possibly 832.
- Abu al-Fadl Ja'far ibn Muhammad al-Mu'tasim famously known by his laqab al-Mutawakkil (842).
- Abu Ja'far Muhammad better known as al-Muntasir (850/851)
- Ibrahim ibn Muhammad ibn Isma'il al-Hashimi (873, 874)
- Harun ibn Muhammad ibn Ishaq al-Hashimi (878–893)

== List of Ottoman umara' al-hajj ==
=== Cairo caravan commanders ===
- Barakat ibn Musa (1518)
- Barsbay (1519)
- Janim ibn Dawlatbay (1520–1523)
- Janim al-Hamzawi (1524–1525)
- Sinan (1526)
- Qanim ibn Maalbay (1527–1530)
- Yusuf al-Hamzawi (1531–1532)
- Mustafa ibn Abdullah al-Rumi (1533)
- Sulayman Pasha (1534)
- Yusuf al-Hamzawi (1535)
- Mustafa ibn Abdullah al-Rumi (1536–1538)
- Janim ibn Qasrah (1539–1545)
- Aydin ibn Abdullah al-Rumi (1546)
- Husayn Abaza (1547)
- Mustafa ibn Abdullah al-Rumi (1548–1551)
- Khawaja Muhammad (1584)
- Mustafa Pasha (1585)
- Umar ibn Isa (1591)
- Ridwan Bey al-Faqari (1631–1656)
- Zul-Faqar Bey (1676–1683)
- Ismail al-Faqar Bey (1684–1688)
- Ibrahim Bey Abu Shanab (1689)
- Ibrahim Bey Zayn al-Faqar (1690–1695)
- Ayyub Bey al-Faqari (1696–1701)
- Qitas Bey (1706–1710)
- Awad Bey (1711)
- Muhammad ibn Ismail Bey (1720–1721)
- Abdallah Bey (1722–1723)
- Muhammad ibn Ismail Bey (1725–1727)
- Ali Bey Zayn al-Faqar (1728–1729)
- Ghitas Bey al-A'war (1730)
- Muhammad Agha al-Kur (1731)
- Ali Bey Qatamish (1732–1734)
- Ibrahim Bey Qatamish (1736–1737)
- Uthman Bey Zayn al-Faqar (1738–1740)
- Umar Bey Qatamish (1741)
- Ali Bey al-Kabir (1753-1754)
- Husayn Bey al-Khashshab(1755)
- Salih Bey al-Qasimi (1756)
- Ibrahim Bey (1771–1773)
- Murad Bey(1778–1786)

=== Damascus caravan commanders ===
- Janbirdi al-Ghazali (1518–1520)
- The unnamed sanjak-bey (district governor) of Safad (1523)
- Uways al-Kashif (1525)
- Kurd Bey ibn Khisru Pasha (1551–52; sanjak-bey of Hama)
- Husayn Bey ibn Muhammad al-Rumi (1553–54; imperial Ottoman official)
- Yunus Bey (1557; sanjak-bey of Homs)
- Murad Bey (1558; sanjak-bey of Ajlun)
- Ridwan Pasha (1560; sanjak-bey of Gaza)
- Darwish Pasha (1567; sanjak-bey of Tripoli)
- Qansuh al-Ghazzawi (1571–1587; based in Ajlun)
- Ahmad ibn Ridwan (1587–1588; based in Gaza)
- Mansur ibn Furaykh (1589–1591; based in the Beqaa Valley)
- Ahmad ibn Ridwan (1591–1606; based in Gaza)
- Farrukh Pasha (1609–1620; based in Nablus)
- Muhammad ibn Farrukh (1621–1638; based in Nablus)
- Assaf Farrukh (1665–1669; based in Nablus)
- Musa Pasha al-Nimr (1670; based in Nablus)
- Ahmed Pasha al-Tarazi (1676–77; based in Lajjun and Jerusalem)
- Hekimbashi Khayri Mustafa Pasha (1689; based in Gaza)
- Mehmed Pasha (1690; based in Jeddah)
- Arslan Mehmed Pasha (1691; based in Tripoli)
- Ahmed Pasha Salih (1697–98; based in Damascus)
- Kaplan Pasha (1699; based in Sidon)
- Çerkes Hasan Pasha (1700–01; based in Damascus)
- Arslan Mehmed Pasha (1702–1703; based in Damascus and Tripoli)
- Mehmed Pasha Kurd Bayram (1704; based in Damascus)
- Yusuf Pasha Qapudan (1707–1708)
- Nasuh Pasha al-Aydini (1708–1712)
- Jarkas Muhammad Pasha (1713–1715)
- Tubal Yusuf Pasha (1715–1716)
- Ibrahim Pasha Qapudan (1716)
- Recep Pasha (1716)
- Nevşehirli Damat Ibrahim Pasha (1716–1717)
- Abdullah Pasha Köprülü (1716–1717)
- Rajab Pasha (1717–1718)
- Uthman Pasha Abu Tawq (1719–1721)
- Ali Pasha Maqtul (1721–1722)
- Uthman Pasha Abu Tawq (1723–1725)
- Ismail Pasha al-Azm (1725–1730)
- Abdullah Pasha al-Aydinli (1731–1734)
- Sulayman Pasha al-Azm (1734–1738)
- Husayn Pasha al-Bustanji (1738)
- Uthman Pasha al-Muhassil (1739–1740)
- Ali Pasha Abu Qili (1740)
- Sulayman Pasha al-Azm (1741–1743)
- As'ad Pasha al-Azm (1743–1757)
- Husayn Pasha ibn Makki (1757)
- Abdullah Pasha al-Jatahji (1757–1759)
- Muhammad Pasha al-Shalik (1759–1760)
- Uthman Pasha al-Kurji (1760–1771)
- Muhammad Pasha al-Azm (1771–1772)
- Hafiz Mustafa Pasha Bustanji (1773)
- Muhammad Pasha al-Azm (1773–1783)
- Darwish Pasha al-Kurji (1783–1784)
- Ahmad Pasha al-Jezzar (1784–1786)
- Husayn Pasha Battal (1786–1787)
- Abdi Pasha (1787–1788)
- Ibrahim Pasha al-Halabi (1788–1789)
- Ahmad Pasha al-Jezzar (1790–1795)
- Abdullah Pasha al-Azm (1795–1798)
- Ahmad Pasha al-Jezzar (1798–1799)
- Abdullah Pasha al-Azm (1799–1803)
- Ahmad Pasha al-Jezzar (1803–1804)
- Abdullah Pasha al-Azm (1804–807)
- Kunj Yusuf Pasha (1807–1810)
- Süleyman Pasha Silahdar (1810–1818)
- Salih Pasha II (1818)
- Abdallah Pasha II (1819–1821)
- Dervish Mehmd Pasha II (1821–1822)
- Mustafa Pasha IV (1822–1826)
- Mehmed Emin Rauf Pasha (1828–1831)
- Mehmed Selim Pasha (1831–1832)

== Modern era ==
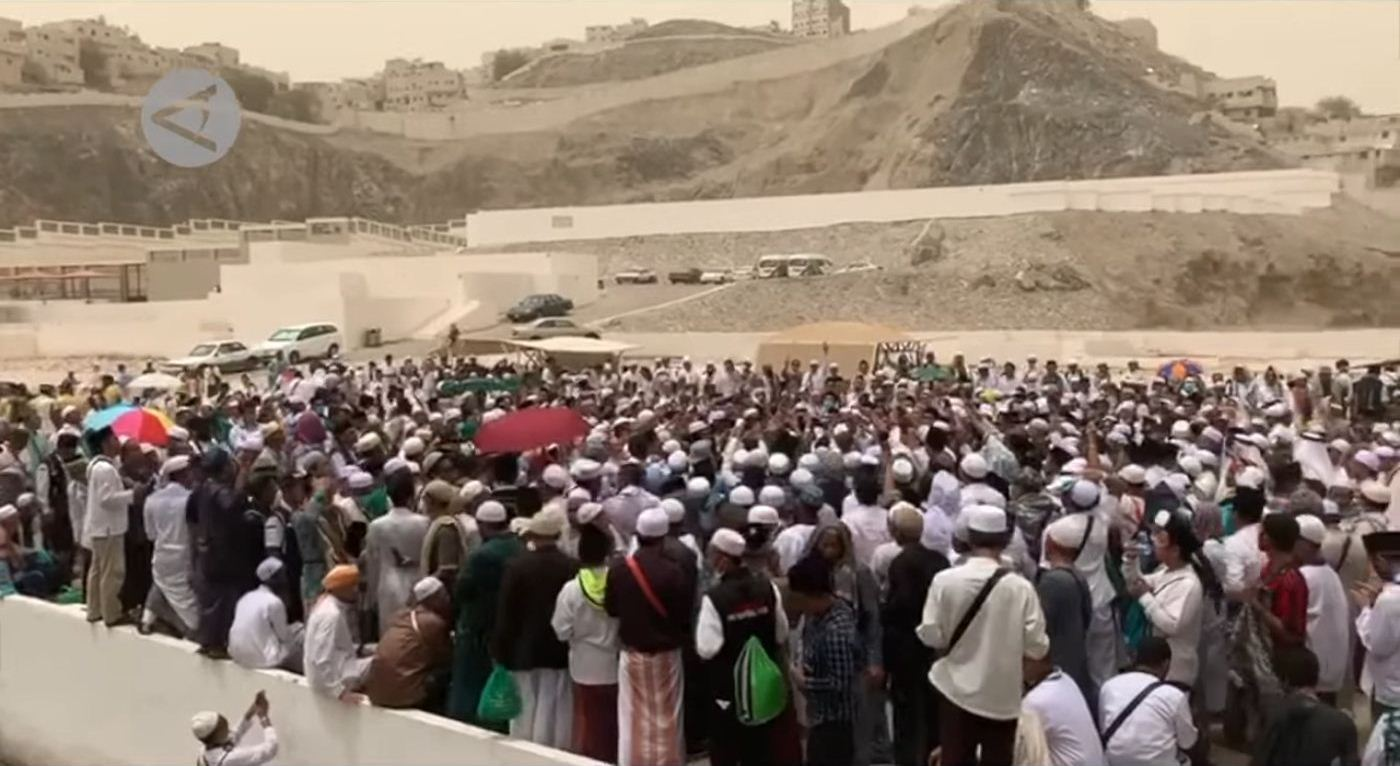

In the modern era, an Amirul Hajj is the leader of a group of Hajj pilgrims, usually appointed by a government body, Hajj commission, or a religious authority. The duties of the modern Amirul Hajj include leading the Hajj pilgrimage, advising on appropriate rules and regulation for performing Hajj, leading prayers, and overseeing grievance procedures. Notable recent holders of such posts include:

- The Sultan of Sokoto, Sa'adu Abubakar was Amirul Hajj of Nigerians performing Hajj for 2013.
- For the Dawoodi Bohra community, Mufaddal Saifuddin was the Amirul Haj in 2012, and his brother Malik ul Ashtar Shujauddin in 2019.
- Former Governor of Kaduna State Abba Musa Rimi was appointed as Amirul Hajj for Nigerian Muslims in August 2013.

== Bibliography ==
- Anderson, Robert (1998). Egypt in 1800: Scenes from Napoleon's Description de L'Egypte. Barrie & Jenkins. ISBN 9780712620062. Archived from the original on 2022-10-09.
- Bakhit, Muhammad Adnan (1982). The Ottoman Province of Damascus in the Sixteenth Century. Librairie du Liban. ISBN 9780866853224.
- Barbir, Karl K. (1980). Ottoman Rule in Damascus, 1708–1758. Princeton University Press. ISBN 9781400853205.
- Burns, Ross (2005). Damascus: A History. Routledge. ISBN 978-0-415-27105-9.
- Creighton, Ness (2012). Dictionary of African Biography. Oup USA. ISBN 9780195382075. Archived from the original on 2022-10-09.
- Al-Damurdashi, Ahmad D. (1991). Abd al-Wahhāb Bakr Muḥammad (ed.). Al-Damurdashi's Chronicle of Egypt, 1688–1755. BRILL. ISBN 9789004094086.
- Dunn, Robert (1986). The Adventures of Ibn Battuta, a Muslim Traveler of the Fourteenth Century. University of California Press. ISBN 9780520057715. Archived from the original on 2022-10-09.
- Ibn Hazm, Abu Muhammad ibn 'Ali ibn Ahmad ibn Sa'id al-Andalusi (1982). Harun, 'Abd al-Salam Muhammad (ed.). Jamharat Ansab al-'Arab (in Arabic) (5th ed.). Cairo: Dar al-Ma'arif.
- Hathaway, Jane (2015). "Amīr al-ḥajj". In Kate Fleet; Gudrun Krämer; Denis Matringe; John Nawas; Everett Rowson (eds.). The Encyclopedia of Islam, THREE. BRILL Online.
- Masters, Bruce Alan (2009). "amir al-hajj". Encyclopedia of the Ottoman Empire. Infobase Publishing. ISBN 9781438110257.
- Al-Mas'udi, Ali ibn al-Husain (1877). Les Prairies D'Or, Tome Neuvième (in French). Ed. and Trans. Charles Barbier de Meynard and Abel Pavet de Courteille. Paris: Imprimerie Nationale.
- Peters, F. E. (1994). The Hajj: The Muslim Pilgrimage to Mecca and the Holy Places. Princeton University Press. ISBN 9780691026190. Archived from the original on 2022-10-09.
- Philipp, Thomas (1998). The Mamluks in Egyptian Politics and Society. Cambridge University Press. ISBN 9780521591157. Archived from the original on 2022-10-09.
- Sato, Tsugitaka (2014). Sugar in the Social Life of Medieval Islam. BRILL. ISBN 9789004281561. Archived from the original on 2022-10-09.
- Singer, Amy (2002). Constructing Ottoman Beneficence: An Imperial Soup Kitchen in Jerusalem. SUNY Press. ISBN 9780791453513.
- Williams, John Alden, ed. (1985). The History of al-Ṭabarī, Volume XXVII: The ʿAbbāsid Revolution, A.D. 743–750/A.H. 126–132. SUNY Series in Near Eastern Studies. Albany, New York: State University of New York Press. ISBN 978-0-87395-884-4.
- Yarshater, Ehsan, ed. (1985–2007). The History of al-Ṭabarī (40 vols). SUNY Series in Near Eastern Studies. Albany, New York: State University of New York Press. ISBN 978-0-7914-7249-1.
- Al-Ya'qubi, Ahmad ibn Abu Ya'qub (1883). Houtsma, M. Th. (ed.). Historiae, Vol. 2 (in Arabic). Leiden: E. J. Brill.
- Ze'evi, Dror (1996). An Ottoman Century: The District of Jerusalem in the 1600s. SUNY Press. ISBN 0-7914-2915-6.
- Khalifah ibn Khayyat (1985). al-'Umari, Akram Diya' (ed.). Tarikh Khalifah ibn Khayyat, 3rd ed (in Arabic). Al-Riyadh: Dar Taybah.
- McMillan, M.E. (2011). The Meaning of Mecca: The Politics of Pilgrimage in Early Islam. London: Saqi. ISBN 978-0-86356-437-6.
- Madelung, W. (1997). The Succession to Muḥammad: A Study of the Early Caliphate. Cambridge University Press. ISBN 978-0-521-64696-3.
