= List of rulers of Damascus =

This is a list of rulers of Damascus from ancient times to the present.

General context: History of Damascus.

== Aram Damascus ==
- Rezon I (c. 950 BC)
- Tabrimmon
- Ben-Hadad I (c. 885 BCE–c. 865 BC)
- Hadadezer (c. 865 BC–c. 842 BC)
- Hazael (c. 842 BC–c. 804 BC)
- Ben-Hadad III (c. 796 BC)
- Tab-El (c. 770 BC)
- Rezon II (c. 740 BC–732 BC)

== Period of non-independence ==
- to Assyria (732 BC–609 BC)
  - Ilu-Ittia (c. 8th century BC)
- to Babylon (609 BC–539 BC)
- to Persian Achaemenid Empire (539 BC–332 BC)
- to Macedon (332 BC–323 BC)
- to Antigonids (323 BC–301 BC)
- to Ptolemaic Kingdom (301 BC–198 BC)
- to Seleucids (198 BC–167 BC)
- to Ituraea (167 BC–110 BC) (Semi independent from Seleucids)
- to the Decapolis (110 BC–85 BC) (Semi independent from Seleucids)
- to Nabataea (85 BC–64 BC)
- to the Roman Republic/Roman Empire/Byzantine Empire (64 BC–635)
  - to the Ghassanids (529–584; ?–635)

== Rashidun period ==
- Khalid ibn al-Walid (635–636)
- Abu Ubaidah ibn al Jarrah (636–637)
- Amr ibn al-Aas (637–640)
- Yazid ibn Abi Sufyan (640)
- Muawiyah ibn Abu Sufyan (640–661)

== Umayyad period ==
- Muawiyah I ibn Abu Sufyan (661–680)
- Yazid I ibn Muawiyah (680–683)
- Muawiya II ibn Yazid (683–684)
- Marwan I ibn Hakam (684–685)
- Abd al-Malik ibn Marwan (685–705)
- al-Walid I ibn Abd al-Malik (705–715)
- Suleiman ibn Abd al-Malik (715–717)
- Umar ibn Abd al-Aziz (717–720)
- Yazid II ibn Abd al-Malik (720–724)
- Hisham ibn Abd al-Malik (724–743)
- al-Walid II ibn Yazid II (743–744)
- Yazid III ibn al-Walid (744)
- Ibrahim ibn al-Walid (744)
- Marwan II ibn Muhammad (ruled from Harran in the Jazira, 744–750)

== Abbasid period ==
The governors of Damascus and Syria during the Abbasid era are:

- Abdallah ibn Ali (750–754)
- Salih ibn Ali (754)
- Abd al-Wahhab ibn Ibrahim ibn Muhammad al-Abbasi (754–764)
- Al-Fadl ibn Salih (766–775)
- Abu Ja'far Harun ibn al-Mahdi (783–786)
- Ibrahim ibn as-Salih ibn Ali (c. 785)
- Muhammad ibn Ibrahim al-Imam (?–788)
- Ibrahim ibn as-Salih ibn Ali (c. 788–791)
- Musa ibn Isa (c. 792)
- Musa ibn Yahya al-Barmaki (c. 792)
- Abd al-Malik ibn Salih (793–795)
- Ishaq ibn Isa ibn Ali (c. 795–?)
- Shu'ayb ibn Khazim (802–803)
- Ja'far ibn Yahya (803)
- Ibrahim ibn Muhammad ibn Ibrahim ibn Muhammad (803–804)
- Sulayman ibn al-Mansur (804–805)
- Yahya ibn Mu'adh ibn Muslim (c. 806)
- Ali ibn al-Hasan ibn Qahtaba (807–809)
- Mansur ibn Muhammad al-Mahdi (809–810)
- Ahmad ibn Sa'id al-Harashi (810)
- Sulayman ibn al-Mansur (810)
- Muhammad ibn Salih ibn Bayhas (813–823 or 824/825)
- Ma'yuf ibn Yahya ibn Ma'yuf al-Hamdani or Sadaqa ibn Uthman al-Murri (appointed by viceroy Abdallah ibn Tahir al-Khurasani) (825–?)
- Abu Ishaq Muhammad ibn Harun al-Rashid (c. 828)
- Dinar ibn Abd Allah (c. 839)
- Muhammed ibn al-Jahm al-Sami (c. 839)
- Musa ibn Ibrahim al Rafiqi (c. 842)
- Rija ibn Ayyub al-Hadari (841–847)
- Malik ibn Tawk (847–850)
- Ibrahim al-Mu'ayyad ibn al-Mutawakkil (850–855)
- al-Fath ibn Hakan al-Turki (856–861), deputy governor of Ibrahim al-Mu'ayyad.
- Yunus ibn Tarja (c. 861)
- Isa ibn Muhammad al-Nawshari (861–866)
- Salih ibn al-Abbasi al-Turki (c. 866)
- Ahmad ibn Khalil al Shaybani (c. 866)
- Yamkjur al-Turki (c. 869)
- Asram al-Turki (c. 870)
- Isa ibn al-Shaykh al-Shaybani, rebel governor (c. 870)
- Amajur al-Turki (870–878)
- Tulunid Egypt (877–904), Vassal of the Abbasid Caliphate:
  - Ali ibn Amajur al-Turki (878)
  - Ahmad ibn Wasif
  - Tughj ibn Juff (896–905)
- Abbasid restoration:
  - Ahmad ibn Kayghalagh (905–906)
  - al-Rashidi (928–931)
  - Muhammad ibn Tughj (931–935)
- Ikhshidid Egypt, (935–969), Vassal of the Abbasid Caliphate:
  - Muhammad Ibn Ra'iq (939–942)
  - Muhammad ibn Yazdad al-Shahrzuri (943–945)
  - Sayf al-Dawla (briefly in 945 and 947)

== Fatimid emirs ==
- Abu Ali Ja'far ibn Fallah al-Kutami (970–971)

Qarmatian occupation of Damascus

- Zalim ibn Mauhab al-Ukayli (973–974)
- Jaysh ibn Muhammad (974)
- Rayn al-Mu'izzi (974)
- Alptakin al-Mu'izzi (975–978)
- Qassam al-Turab (978–983)

Fatimid recovery of Damascus

- Baltakin al-Turki (983)
- Bakjur (983–991)
- Ya'qub as-Saqlabi (991)
- Manjutakin (993–996)
- Sulayman ibn Fallah (996)
- Bishara al-Ikhshidi (997–998)
- Jaysh ibn Muhammad (998–1000)
- Sulayman ibn Fallah (1000–1002)
- Abu'l-Hasan Ali ibn Jafar (1002–1004)
- Abu Salih Muflih al-Lihyani (1004–1009)
- Hamid ibn Mulham (1009)
- Wajik ad-Dawlah Abu al-Muta Zu-l-Karnayn Hamdan (1010–1011)
- Badr al-Attar (1011–1012)
- Abu Abdallah al-Muzahhir (1012–1014)
- Abd ar-Rahman ibn Ilyas (1015–1021)
- Wajik ad-Dawlah Abu al-Muta Zu-l-Karnayn Hamdan (1021–1023)
- Shihab ad-Dawlah Shah Tegin (1023–1024)
- Wajik ad-Dawlah Abu al-Muta Zu-l-Karnayn Hamdan (1024–1028)
- Anushtakin ad-Dizbari (1028–1041)
- Nasir ad-Dawlah al-Hamdani (1041–1048)
- Baha ad-Dawlah Takiq al-Saklabi (1048–1049)
- Rifq al-Khadim (1049)
- Mu'in ad-Dawlah Haydar ibn Adud ad-Dawlah (1049–1058)
- Makin ad-Dawlah Abu Ali al-Hasan ibn 'Ali (1058)
- Nasir ad-Dawlah al-Hamdani (1058–1060)
- Sebuq Tegin (1060)
- Muwaffaq ad-Dawlah Jauhar al-Mustansiri (1060–1061)
- Hasam ad-Dawlah ibn al-Bachinaki (1061)
- Uddat ad-Dawlah ibn al-Husein (1061)
- Mu'in ad-Dawlah Haydar ibn Adud ad-Dawla (1061–1063)
- Badr al-Jamali (1063)
- Hisn ad-Dawlah Haydar ibn Mansur (1063–1067)
- Qutb ad-Din Baris Tegin (1068–1069)
- Hisn ad-Dawlah Mualla al-Kitami (1069–1071)
- Zain ad-Dawlah Intisar ibn Yahya al-Masmudi (1075–1076)

== Seljuk, Burid and Zengid emirs ==
=== Seljuk emirs ===
- Atsiz ibn Abaq (1076–1079)
- Tutush I (1079–1095)
- Duqaq, son of Tutush I (1095–1104)
- Tutush II, son of Duqaq (1104)
- Irtash, son of Tutush I (1104)

=== Burid emirs ===
- Toghtekin (1104–1128)
- Taj al-Muluk Buri (1128–1132)
- Shams al-Mulk Isma'il (1132–1135)
- Shihab ad-Din Mahmud (1135–1139)
- Jamal ad-Din Muhammad (1139–1140)
- Mu'in ad-Din Unur (Regent, 1140–1149)
- Mujir ad-Din Abaq (1140–1154)

=== Zengid emirs ===
- Nur ad-Din Mahmud (1154–1174)
- As-Salih Ismail al-Malik (1174)

== Ayyubid emirs ==
Some rulers of Damascus during Ayyubid era were also Sultans of Egypt, the emirs of Damascus of this era were:

- Saladin (1174–1186)
- Al-Afdal (1186–1196), Son of Saladin
- Al-Adil I (1196–1218)
- Al-Mu'azzam (1218–1227)
- An-Nasir Dawud (1227–1229)
- Al-Ashraf (1229–1237)
- As-Salih Ismail (1237)
- Al-Kamil (1237–1238)
- Al-Adil II (1238–1239)
- As-Salih Ayyub (1239)
- As-Salih Ismail (1239–1245)
- As-Salih Ayyub (1245–1249)
- Al-Muazzam Turanshah (1249–1250)
- An-Nasir Yusuf (1250–1260)

== Mamluk na'ibs ==
- Sanjar as-Salihi (August/September 1260–October 1260)
- Taybars al-Waziri (October 1260–1264)
- Aqqush as-Salihi (1264–)
- Sunqur al-Ashqar (1279–1280)
- Lajin al-Ashqar (1280–?)
- Aqush Bey (c. 1290s)
- Izz ad-Din Aybak (?–1296)
- Shuja ad-Din Adirlu (1296–1297)
- Sayf ad-Din Kipchak (1297–1299)
- Aqqush al-Afram (1299–1309)
- Sayf ad-Din Tanqiz an-Nasiri (1312–1340)
- Yilbugha an-Nasiri (1340–1350)
- Sayf ad-Din Manjak (1350)
- Tash Timur (c. 1380)
- Yilbugha al-Nasiri (?–1393)
- Sayf ad-Din Tanibak (1393–1399)
- Sudun (1399–1400)
- occupied by Timur (1400–1401)
- Taghribirdi az-Zahiri (1401–?)
- Sayf ad-Din Jaqmaq (1418–1420)
- Kijmas (c. 1470s)
- Ghazali Arab (c. 16th century)
- Sibai (c. 16th century)
- Shihab ad-Din Ahmad (1516–1517)
- Janbirdi al-Ghazali (1518–1521)

== Ottoman period ==
- Yunus Pasha (c. 1516)
- Janbirdi al-Ghazali (1518–1521)
- Ayas Mehmed Pasha (1521–1522)
- Ferhad Pasha (1522–1523)
- Hurram Pasha (1523–1525)
- Sulayman Pasha al-Tawashi (1525–1526)
- Lutf Pasha (1526–1528)
- Isa Bey Pasha Chenderli (1528–1531)
- Mustafa Ablaq Pasha (1531–1534)
- Lutf Pasha (1534–1535)
- Isa Bey Pasha Chenderli (1535)
- Muhammad Kuzal Pasha (1536–1537)
- Topal Sulayman Pasha (1537–1538)
- Ahmed Pasha I (1538–1539)
- Qese Husrau Pasha (1539–1541)
- Isa Pasha (1541–1543)
- Piri Pasha (1543–1545)
- Sinan Pasha al-Tuwashi (1545–1548)
- Piri Pasha (1550–1551)
- Muhammad Pasha Bartaki (1551–1552)
- Şemsi Pasha (1552–1555)
- Hizr Pasha (1555–1561)
- Ali Pasha Lankun (1561–1563)
- Khusrau Pasha I (1563)
- Lala Mustafa Pasha (1563–1569)
- Murad Pasha Shaitan (1569)
- Ali Pasha Lankun (1569–1570)
- Haji Ahmed Pasha (1570–1571)
- Darwish Pasha (1571–1574)
- Lala Jafar Pasha (1574–1575)
- Murad Pasha (1575–1577)
- Sokulluzade Hasan Pasha (1577–1581)
- Bahram Pasha (1581–1582)
- Hüseyin Pasha Boljanić (1582–1583)
- Sokulluzade Hasan Pasha (1583)
- Qubad Sulayman Pasha (1584)
- Üveys Pasha (1584–1585)
- Elvendoglu Ali Pasha (October 1585–1586)
- Üveys Pasha (1586–1587)
- Muhammad Pasha Farhad (1587–1588)
- Üveys Pasha (1588–1589)
- Elwanzade Ali Pasha (1589–1590)
- Koca Sinan Pasha (1590)
- Sokulluzade Hasan Pasha (1590–1591)
- Mustafa Pasha I (1591–1592)
- Khalil Pasha (1592–1593)
- Qachirji Mohammad Pasha (1593–1594)
- Sokulluzade Hasan Pasha (1594)
- Kuyucu Murad Pasha (1594–1595)
- Khusrau Pasha II (1595–1596)
- Razia Hutunzade Mustafa Pasha (1596–1597)
- Yusuf Sinan Pasha (1597–1598)
- Ahmed Pasha II (1598)
- Ahmed Pasha III (1598)
- Khusrau Pasha II (1599)
- Emir Mehmed Pasha (1599–1600)
- Osman Pasha (1601–1603)
- Farhad Pasha Bustanji (1603–1604)
- Mustafa Pasha II (1604–1607)
- Mahmud Pasha (1607–1608)
- Sufi Sinan Pasha (1608–1609)
- Ahmad al-Hafiz (1609–1615)
- Silihdar Mehmed Pasha (1615–1618)
- Ahmad al-Hafiz (1618–1619)
- Mustafa Pasha III (1619–1620)
- Sulayman Pasha I (1620–1621)
- Murtaza Pasha Bustanji (1621–1622)
- Mehmed Pasha Rushand (1622–1623)
- Mustafa Pasha al-Hannaq (1623–1624)
- Nigdeli Mustafa Pasha (1624–1625)
- Gurju Mehmed Pasha I (1625–1626)
- Tayar Oglu Mehmed Pasha (1626–1628)
- Küçük Ahmed Pasha (1628–1629)
- Mustafa Pasha IV (1629–1630)
- Nawaya Mehmed Pasha (1630–1631)
- Ilyas Pasha (1632–1633)
- Deli Yusuf Pasha (1633–1635)
- Küçük Ahmed Pasha (1635–1636)
- Dervish Mehmed Pasha (1636–1638)
- Mustafa Pasha IV (1638–1639)
- Chifteli Othman Pasha (1639–1640)
- Mehmed Pasha I (1640–1641)
- Serji Ahmed Pasha (1641–1642)
- Melik Ahmed Pasha (1642–1643)
- Sultanzade Mehmed Pasha (1643)
- Silihdar Yusuf Pasha (1643–1644)
- Gurju Mehmed Pasha II (1644–1645)
- Ibrahim Pasha I (1645)
- Mehmed Pasha Salami (1645–1646)
- Gürcê Mehmed (1646)
- Silahdar Yusuf Pasha (1646–1647)
- Sufi Murteza Pasha (1647)
- Sofu Mehmed Pasha (1648)
- Ibşir Mustafa Pasha (1649)
- Mehmed Pasha II (1649–1650)
- Silahdar Murtaza Pasha (1650)
- Sivaslı Mustafa Pasha (1650)
- Haseki Mehmed Pasha (1650–1652)
- Defterzade Mehmed Pasha (1653–1655)
- Kara Murat Pasha (1655; died before taking office)
- Haseki Mehmed Pasha (1656)
- Köprülü Fazıl Ahmed Pasha (1659–1661)
- Sulayman Pasha II (1661–1663)
- Ribleli Mustafa Pasha (1663–1665)
- Salih Pasha I (1665–1666)
- Qara Mustafa Pasha (1666–1667)
- Mehmed Pasha Chewish Oglu (1667–1669)
- Ibrahim Pasha Shaytan (1669–1671)
- Abazekh Husein Pasha (1671–1672)
- Qara Mehmed Pasha (1672–1673)
- Ibrahim Pasha Shushman (1673–1674)
- Qer Husein Pasha (1674–1675)
- Ibrahim Pasha II (1675–1676)
- Bosniak Osman Pasha (1676–1679)
- Abazekh Husein Pasha (1679–1683)
- Ibrahim Pasha III (1684)
- Bosniak Osman Pasha (1684–1685)
- Kaplan Pasha (1686–1687)
- Arap Salih Pasha (1687–1688)
- Hamza Pasha (1688–1689)
- Bozoklu Mustafa Pasha (1690)
- Murtaza Pasha (1690–1691)
- Gurju Mehmed Pasha III (1691–1692)
- Çelebi Ismail Pasha (1692–1693)
- Ibshir Mustafa Pasha (1693–1694)
- Silihdar Osman Pasha (1695–1696)
- Silihdar Buuqli Mustafa Pasha (1696–1697)
- Ahmad Pasha Hacigirai (1697–1698)
- Silihdar Husein Pasha (1699)
- Silihdar Hasan Pasha (1700)
- Arslan Mehmed Pasha Matracyoghlu (1701)
- Salih Agha (1702)
- Mehmed Pasha Kurd-Bayram (1702–1703)
- Osman Pasha Arnavud (1703)
- Arslan Mehmed Pasha Matracyoghlu (1703–1704)
- Defterdar Mustafa Pasha (1704)
- Firari Hüseyin Pasha (1704–1705)
- Mehmed Pasha Kurd-Bayram (1705–1706)
- Baltacı Süleyman Pasha (1706–1707)
- Yusuf Pasha Qapudan (1707–1708)
- Nasuh Pasha al-Aydini (1708–1714)
- Topal Yusuf Pasha (1714–1716)
- Kapudan Ibrahim Pasha (1716–1717)
- Köprülü Abdullah Pasha (1717–1718)
- Recep Pasha (1718–1719)
- Çerkes Osman Pasha Abu Tawq (1719–1721)
- Ali Pasha Maqtuloğlu (1721–1723)
- Çerkes Osman Pasha Abu Tawq (1723–1725)
- Ismail Pasha al-Azm (1725–November/December 1730)
- Muhsinzâde Abdullah Pasha (November/December 1730–December 1730)
- Ayndınlı Abdullah Pasha (December 1730–1734)
- Sulayman Pasha al-Azm (1734–1738)
- Hüseyin Pasha Bostancı (1738–1739)
- Muhassıl Osman Pasha (1739–1740)
- Abdî Pashazâde Ali Pasha (1740–1741)
- Sulayman Pasha al-Azm (1741–1743)
- As'ad Pasha al-Azm (1743–1757)
- Husayn Pasha ibn Makki (1757–1758)
- Çeteci Abdullah Pasha (1758–1759)
- Muhammad Pasha al-Shalik (1759–1760)
- Uthman Pasha al-Kurji (1760–1771)
- Muhammad Pasha al-Azm (1771–1772)
- Hafiz Mustafa Pasha Bustanji (1773–1783)
- Mehmed Pasha al-Kurji (1783)
- Darwish Pasha al-Kurji (1783–1784)
- Ahmad Pasha al-Jazzar (1784–1786)
- Husayn Pasha Battal (1786–1787)
- Abdi Pasha (1787–1788)
- Ibrahim Pasha al-Dalati (1788–1789)
- Ahmad Pasha al-Jazzar (1790–1795)
- Abdullah Pasha al-Azm (1795–1798)
- Ahmad Pasha al-Jazzar (1798–1799)
- Abdullah Pasha al-Azm (1799–1803)
- Ahmad Pasha al-Jazzar (1803–1804)
- Abdullah Pasha al-Azm (1804–1807)
- Kunj Yusuf Pasha (1807–1810)
- Sulayman Pasha al-Adil (1810–1812)
- Silahdar Süleyman Pasha (February 1812–May 1816)
- Sulayman Pasha al-Adil (1816; interim)
- Hafiz Amasyali Ali Pasha (1816–March 1817)
- Salih Pasha (March 1817–1817)
- Izmirli Süleyman Pasha (1817–1819)
- Dervish Mehmed Pasha (1819–1822)
- Beylanli Mustafa Pasha (June 1822–April 1823)
- Salih Pasha (April 1823–January 1824)
- Muftizade Ahmed Pasha (1824–May 1824)
- Haci Veliyeddin Pasha (1825–1826)
- Hakki Ismail Pasha (October 1826–1827)
- Izmirli Haci Salih Pasha (1827–1828)
- Mehmed Emin Rauf Pasha (1828–1831)
- Mehmed Selim Pasha (1831–1832)
- to Egypt, autonomous from the Ottoman Empire
  - Ahmed Bey (1831–1832)
  - Ibrahim Pasha (1832)
  - Muhammad Sharif Pasha al-Kabir (1832–1838)
  - vacant (1838–1840)
- Izzet Mehmed Pasha (1840–1841)
- Mehmed Reshid Pasha (1841–1844)
- Mehmed Namık Pasha (1845–1846)
- Riza Pasha (1845–1846)
- Musa Sefveti Pasha (1846)
- Namiq Pasha (1848)
- Mehmed Namık Pasha (1848–1850)
- Osman Pasha Said Pasha (1850–1852)
- Izzet Mehmed Pasha (1852)
- Açaf Pasha (1852–1854)
- Arif Mehmed Pasha (1854–1855)
- Mehmed Namık Pasha (1855)
- Mahmud Nedim Pasha (1855–1857)
- Izzet Ahmed Pasha (1857)
- Ali Pasha II (1858)
- Mu'amer Pasha (1860)
- Mehmed Fuad Pasha (1860–1861)
- Ahmed Pasha IV (1861)
- Emin Muhlis Pasha (1861–1862)
- Mehmed Reshid Pasha (1862–1864)
- Müterçim Mehmed Rüstü Pasha (1864–1865)
- Reshid Pasha (1865–1871)
- Subhi Pasha (1871–1873)
- Sherif Mehmed Re'uf Pasha (1873–1874)
- Esad Pasha (1874–1875)
- Ahmed Hamdi Pasha (1875–1876)
- Ahmed Pasha V (1876–1877)
- Küçük Ömer Fevzi Pasha (1877–1878)
- Midhat Pasha (13 November 1878–1 August 1880)
- Hamdi Pasha (1880–1885)
- Rashid Nashid Pasha (1885–1888)
- Manastirli Mehmed Nazif Pasha (1888–1889)
- Mustafa Asim Pasha (1889–1891)
- Topal Osman Nuri Pasha (1891–1892)
- Sherif Mehmed Rauf Pasha (1892–1894)
- Haçi Osman Nuri Pasha (1894–1895)
- Hasan Pasha II (1896–1897)
- Hüseyin Nâzım Pasha (1897–1906)
- Shukri Pasha (1906–1909)
- Ismail Fazil Bey (1909–1911)
- Ismail Ghalib Bey (1911–1912)
- Kiazim Pasha (1912–1913)
- Arif Bey (1913)
- Mehmed Arif Bey Mardin (1914)
- Jamal Pasha (1915)
- Azmi Pasha (1915–1916)
- Tahsin Bey (1916–1918)
- Mehmed Gabriel Pasha (1918)
- Shukri Pasha (October 1–2, 1918)

== Twentieth century – present ==
=== Arab Kingdom of Syria ===
- Faisal (1918–1920)

=== Capital of Syria ===
- French Syria (1920–1946)
- Syrian Republic (1946–1958)
- United Arab Republic (1958–1961)
- Syrian Arab Republic (1961–1963)
- Syrian Arab Republic (Ba'athist) (1963–2024)
- Syrian Arab Republic (Transitional period) (2024–present)

== See also ==
- Timeline of Damascus
- List of rulers of Aleppo

== Bibliography ==
- Abu-Husayn, Abdul-Rahim (1985). Provincial Leaderships in Syria, 1575–1650. Beirut: American University of Beirut. ISBN 978-0-8156-6072-9. OCLC 242675094.
- Barbir, Karl K. (1980). Ottoman Rule in Damascus, 1708–1758. Princeton: Princeton University Press. ISBN 9781400853205.
- Burns, Ross (2007), Damascus: A History, Routledge, ISBN 9781134488490
- Saliba, Najib E. (1978). "The Achievements of Midhat Pasha as Governor of the Province of Syria, 1878–1880". International Journal of Middle East Studies. 9 (3): 307–323. JSTOR 162767.
