= Muraywid =

Muraywid مريود
- Village
- Location in Syria
- Coordinates: 35°15′27″N 36°50′20″E
- Country: Syria
- Governorate: Hama
- District: Hama
- Subdistrict: Hama

Population (2004)
  - Total: 750
- Time zone: UTC+3 (AST)
- City Qrya Pcode: N/A

Muraywid (Arabic: مريود; also transliterated Mreiwid) is a village in central Syria, administratively part of the Hama Governorate, located northeast of Hama city. According to the Syria Central Bureau of Statistics (CBS), Muraywid had a population of 750 in the 2004 census. Its inhabitants are Alawites.

== History ==
Muraywid was sold by a sheikh of the Bani Khalid, a semi-Bedouin tribe of central Syria, to the prominent Azm family of Hama city in 1900. Its inhabitants were Alawite tenant farmers who were settled there in the 1920s or early 1930s.

== Bibliography ==
- Comité de l'Asie française (April 1933). "Notes sur la propriété foncière dans le Syrie centrale (Notes on Landownership in Central Syria)". Bulletin du Comité de l'Asie française (in French). 33 (309). Comité de l'Asie française: 130–136.
