= Al-Mubattan =

Al-Mubattan المبطن
- Village
- Location in Syria
- Coordinates: 35°16′45″N 36°50′32″E
- Country: Syria
- Governorate: Hama
- District: Hama
- Subdistrict: Hama

Population (2004)
  - Total: 400
- Time zone: UTC+3 (AST)
- City Qrya Pcode: C2967

Al-Mubattan (Arabic: المبطن; also transliterated Mbattan) is a village in central Syria, administratively part of the Hama Governorate. According to the Syria Central Bureau of Statistics (CBS), al-Mubattan had a population of 400 in the 2004 census.

== History ==
Al-Mubattan was incorporated into the Ottoman Empire along with the rest of Syria in 1516 after they defeated the Mamluks. Unlike many surrounding settlements, Al-Mubattan's population declined during the early Ottoman era, falling from 20 households in 1526, to 11 households in 1551. By 1594, it no longer had any recorded inhabitants. In 1890, al-Mubattan was sold by a sheikh of the Bani Khalid, a Bedouin tribe of central Syria, to the Azm family of Hama. Its inhabitants were Sunni Muslim Arab tenant farmers.

By the time the Syrian Civil War began, al-Mubattan appears to have been a predominantly Alawite settlement. On 9 December 2024, armed men from Raqqa and Khan Sheikhoun reportedly seized the property of the residents and expelled them. By 5 February 2025, there were only 15 people still living in the village and as of 15 May it appears that the residents have remained unable to return to their homes.

== Bibliography ==
- Comité de l'Asie française (April 1933). "Notes sur la propriété foncière dans le Syrie centrale (Notes on Landownership in Central Syria)". Bulletin du Comité de l'Asie française (in French). 33 (309). Comité de l'Asie française: 130–136.
