= Ismail Pasha al-Azm =

Ottoman statesman and Governor of Damascus

Wali of Crete
- In office 1731–1732
- Monarch: Mahmud I
- Preceded by: Sahin Mehmed Pasha
- Succeeded by: Haci Halil Pasha

Wali of Damascus
- In office 1725–1730
- Monarch: Ahmed III
- Preceded by: Çerkes Osman Pasha (Abu Tawq)
- Succeeded by: Abdullah Pasha al-Aydinli

Wali of Tripoli
- In office 1721–1725
- Monarch: Ahmed III
- Succeeded by: Sulayman Pasha al-Azm

Personal details
- Relations: Al-Azm family Sulayman Pasha al-Azm (brother)
- Children: As'ad Pasha al-Azm; Sa'deddin Pasha al-Azm

Military service
- Allegiance: Ottoman Empire
- Commands: Amir al-hajj (1725–1730); Agha of Ma'arra (until 1719)

Ismail Pasha al-Azm was an Ottoman statesman who served as the governor of Damascus and amir al-hajj in 1725–1730. Prior to this post he served as the agha (local commander) of Ma'arrat al-Nu'man and steadily moved up the ranks to become the governor of the districts of Ma'arrat al-Nu'man, Hama and Homs in 1719 and then governor of Tripoli in 1721 before being assigned to the Damascus governorship.

His consistent promotion was attributed to his successes in restoring order to the Syrian countryside after a period of high instability, protecting Syria's farmlands from Bedouin raids and ensuring the safety of the annual Hajj pilgrim caravan to Mecca. Although he was deposed from the governorship in 1730, he established his family, al-Azm, as a major political household in Syria whose members were frequently appointed as the governors of the Damascus, Tripoli and Sidon provinces and who often served longer than typical terms.

== Early career in central Syria ==
Ismail was the son of a professional Ottoman soldier, Ibrahim al-'Azm, a rural notable, who was sent to Ma'arrat al-Nu'man to restore order in the mid-seventeenth century; Ismail was known as "Ibn al-Azm" (Son of al-Azm) and early in his career as "Ismail Agha". He is first mentioned in the history records in 1717, when, as the agha (local military commander) of Ma'arra, he sent wheat and barley provisions to Homs after that city faced a food shortage following an attack by Bedouin raiders. In 1719, he was appointed the mutasallim (district governor) of the Ma'arra, Homs and Hama sanjaks (districts); Ma'arra was part of Aleppo Eyalet, while Homs and Hama were part of Tripoli Eyalet. Ismail was charged with repopulating villages that had been abandoned due to Bedouin raids and restoring order in the districts. In late 1719, the central authorities commanded him to forcibly settle the nomadic and frequently rebellious Turkmen tribesmen of the region in villages in his territory.

Al-Azm was able to bring order and peace to the districts through forming local alliances and with the support of Aleppo's wali (provincial governor). The latter used his influence to persuade the Sublime Porte (Ottoman imperial government) to send Ismail imperial troops to rein in the nomadic Turkmen and Mawali tribes. The Sublime Porte also granted Ismail and his family certain privileges that guaranteed them significant income. Ismail's restoration of order amid instability marked by frequent Bedouin raids, infighting among various military forces and the brutality of local administrators, gained him a "reputation as a resolute but just and even generous ruler", according to historian Dick Douwes. The 18th-century Homs-based chronicler Muhammad al-Makki praised Ismail's rule and prayed that "God give him strength and make him stand firm and prolong his rule and deliver him and his troops from his enemies".

Although his appointment was for seven years, by his second year in office, in 1721, Ismail was promoted as wali of Tripoli Eyalet, and was thereafter known as "Ismail Pasha". During his term, he successfully protected Muslim pilgrim convoys on their way to Damascus, from where they would begin their departure to Mecca to perform the Hajj. Ismail Pasha also ensured that the towns of Tripoli Eyalet had sufficient food supplies and he protected the province's farmlands from harvest thieves. This contrasted with the other governors of Tripoli, who typically neglected their duties in the Homs and Hama districts due to the challenge posed in those regions by frequent Bedouin depredations. During Ismail Pasha's time in office, the central authorities granted him a malikâne (leasehold for life) over the sanjak of Hama, while the town of Hama became the countryside headquarters of the al-Azm family after they moved there from Ma'arra.

== Wali of Damascus ==
Ismail Pasha was transferred to the governorship of Damascus Eyalet in 1725, after a revolt in the city against Wali Çerkes Osman Pasha. He was replaced by his brother Sulayman Pasha al-Azm in Tripoli, while one of his sons was appointed mutasallim of Hama. As wali of Damascus, he was tasked with bringing order to the Syrian interior from Ma'arra in the north to the eastern bank of the Jordan River in the south. He was also concurrently appointed amir al-hajj and was thus responsible for the safety and provisioning of the annual Hajj caravan from Damascus to Mecca. In his first four years (1725–1729) as amir al-hajj, Ismail Pasha successfully countered four attempted Bedouin raids against the caravan. Throughout his term in Damascus, Ismail Pasha appointed members of his family or their close associates as the mutasallims of Hama, Homs and Ma'arra. He established lucrative monopolies as governor, including on sheep from Hama, and was responsible for a number of building works in the city of Damascus.

Ismail Pasha was dismissed from the governorship in late 1730 when the Sublime Porte accused him of embezzling money slated for provisioning the Hajj caravan. However, this charge was deemed "dubious" by historian Karl Barbir. Ismail Pasha was likely dismissed due to the ousting of Sultan Ahmed III in a coup and the consequent dismissal of provincial governors appointed under Ahmed's administration. In addition to his imprisonment in the Citadel of Damascus, Ismail Pasha's properties were seized by the authorities, while his brother Sulayman Pasha was dismissed from the Tripoli governorship. However, in 1731, Ismail Pasha and Sulayman Pasha were pardoned. Ismail Pasha was appointed wali of Crete Eyalet in 1731 and served until 1732. Sulayman Pasha would later succeed Ismail as wali of Damascus in 1734.

== Legacy ==
Ismail Pasha established the foundations of the al-Azm family's prominence in Syria as the most powerful political household in the provinces of Damascus, Sidon and Tripoli in the 18th century. Between 1725 and 1757, the al-Azm family nearly monopolized the offices of wali of Damascus and amir al-hajj. The frequent and consecutive appointments of al-Azm members to Damascus contrasted with the traditionally short, typically one-year-long, terms that most governors of Damascus served. The fact that the al-Azms were from Syria also differed from the mostly non-Syrian officials who traditionally filled the post of wali of Damascus. During those years, the al-Azm family was able to prevent Bedouin raids against Syrian villages and maintained the protection of grain harvests and the grain supply to Damascus. Among the al-Azm governors that succeeded Ismail Pasha was his son As'ad Pasha al-Azm, who ruled longer than any other wali of Damascus, serving for 14 consecutive years.

== Bibliography ==
- Abi-Mershed, Osama (2010). Trajectories of Education in the Arab World: Legacies and Challenges. Routledge. ISBN 9781135256500.
- Barbir, Karl K. (1980). Ottoman Rule in Damascus, 1708–1758. Princeton University Press. ISBN 9781400853205.
- Bidwell, Robin Leonard (1998). Dictionary Of Modern Arab History. Abingdon: Routledge. ISBN 0-7103-0505-2.
- Burns, Ross (2005). Damascus: A History. Routledge. ISBN 978-0-415-41317-6.
- Douwes, Dick (2000). The Ottomans in Syria: a history of justice and oppression. I.B. Tauris. ISBN 1-86064-031-1.

Political offices
Preceded by Çerkes Osman Pasha	Wali of Damascus; 1725–1730	Succeeded by Abdullah Pasha al-Aydinli
Preceded by	Wali of Tripoli; 1721–1725	Succeeded by Sulayman Pasha al-Azm
