= Çerkes Osman Pasha =

Çerkes Küçük Osman Pasha

Wali of Sidon
- In office 1725–1726
- Monarch: Ahmed III
- Preceded by: Hafiz Ahmad Pasha (Abu Tawq)
- Succeeded by: Köprülü Abdullah Pasha
- In office 1717–1718
- Preceded by: Bashir Pasha al-Matarji
- Succeeded by: Hafiz Ahmad Pasha (Abu Tawq)

Wali of Damascus
- In office 1723–1725
- Monarch: Ahmed III
- Preceded by: Ali Pasha Maqtul
- Succeeded by: Ismail Pasha al-Azm
- In office 1719–1721
- Preceded by: Recep Pasha
- Succeeded by: Ali Pasha Maqtul

Personal details
- Died: 1727
- Spouse(s): Fülane Hatun Ümmügülsüm Sultan (m. 1693; died 1720)
- Relations: First marriage Hafiz Ahmed Pasha; Second marriage Mihrişah Hanımsultan; Hatice Hanımsultan; Fatma Hanımsultan

Çerkes Küçük Osman Pasha, also known as Uthman Pasha Abu Tawq (died 1727), was an Ottoman statesman. He served as the wali (governor) of the Sidon and Damascus eyalets (provinces) in the early 18th century.

== Biography ==
Of Circassian origin. In Damascus, Osman Pasha (known by the Damascenes as "Abu Tawq") served twice in 1719-1721 and 1723–1725, and was known to be a particularly oppressive governor, who, with the use of his paramilitary forces, extorted the inhabitants of the city and its countryside. He served as governor of Sidon in 1717-1718 and 1725-1726 (his son Hafiz Ahmed Pasha was wali of Sidon in 1723–1725). Osman Pasha governed both provinces in his last term, but resided in Sidon and entrusted the administration of Damascus with a deputy governor.

Damascene anger towards his heavy-handed rule precipitated a popular revolt led by the Hanafi mufti, Khalil al-Bakri, which ultimately led to Osman Pasha's dismissal from the governorship of Damascus; al-Bakri persuaded Sultan Ahmed III that Osman Pasha was unfit to govern the city. Osman Pasha was replaced by Ismail Pasha al-Azm, the first of many al-Azm family members to govern Damascus. Osman Pasha continued to serve in Sidon until he was replaced by Köprülü Abdullah Pasha. Osman Pasha died in 1727. His son Ahmed Pasha later served a second term as governor of Sidon in 1730–1734.

== Marriages and issue ==
Osman Pasha had two wives:

- Fülane Hatun. Her name is unknown. She died or was disowned before 1693. By her he had his only son:
  - Hafiz Ahmed Pasha. He was twice governor of Sidon (1723–1725 and 1730–1734)
- Ümmugülsüm Sultan. Daughter of Sultan Mehmed IV and his Haseki Gülnuş Sultan. They married in 1693 and Ümmügülsüm died in 1720. They had three daughters:
  - Mihrişah Hanımsultan (? - 1701, buried in Yeni Cami)
  - Hatice Hanımsultan (? - 1698, buried in Yeni Cami)
  - Fatma Hanımsultan. Only daughter who survived beyond infancy.

== Bibliography ==
- Artan, Tulay (2011). "Royal Weddings and the Grand Vezirate". In Duindam, Jeroen; Kunt, Metin (eds.). Royal Courts in Dynastic States and Empires: A Global Perspective. Brill. ISBN 9789004206229.
- Joudah, Ahmad Hasan (1987). Revolt in Palestine in the Eighteenth Century: The Era of Shaykh Zahir Al-ʻUmar. Kingston Press. ISBN 978-0-940670-11-2.
- Masters, Bruce (2013). The Arabs of the Ottoman Empire, 1516–1918: A Social and Cultural History. Cambridge University Press. ISBN 978-1-107-06779-0.
- Philipp, Thomas (1992). The Syrian Land in the 18th and 19th Century: the Common and the Specific in the Historical Experience. F. Steiner. ISBN 9783515056854.
- Schilcher, Linda Schatkowski (1985). Families in Politics: Damascene Factions and Estates of the 18th and 19th Centuries. F. Steiner. ISBN 9783515031462.

Political offices
Preceded by Bashir Pasha al-Matarji	Wali of Sidon; 1717–1718	Succeeded by Ahmad Pasha Abu Tawq
Preceded by Recep Pasha	Wali of Damascus; 1719–1721	Succeeded by Ali Pasha Maqtul
Preceded by Ali Pasha Maqtul	Wali of Damascus; 1723–1725	Succeeded by Ismail Pasha al-Azm
Preceded by Ahmad Pasha Abu Tawq	Wali of Sidon; 1725–1726	Succeeded by Köprülü Abdullah Pasha
