= Sulayman Pasha al-Azm =

Governor of Damascus, Egypt, and Tripoli under the Ottoman Empire

Sulayman Pasha al-Azem

Governor of Damascus
- In office 1741–1743
- Monarch: Mahmud I
- Preceded by: Abdi Pashazade Ali Pasha
- Succeeded by: As'ad Pasha al-Azem
- In office 1734–1738
- Preceded by: Abdullah Pasha al-Aydinli
- Succeeded by: Husayn Pasha al-Bustanji

Governor of Egypt
- In office 1739–1740
- Monarch: Mahmud I
- Preceded by: Ebubekir Pasha
- Succeeded by: Hekimoğlu Ali Pasha

Governor of Sidon
- In office 1728–1730
- Monarchs: Ahmed III; Mahmud I
- Preceded by: Köprülü Abdullah Pasha
- Succeeded by: Ahmad Pasha Abu Tawq

Governor of Tripoli
- In office 1725–1727
- Monarch: Ahmed III
- Preceded by: Ismail Pasha al-Azem

Personal details
- Died: August 1743 Lubya, Sidon Eyalet, Ottoman Empire
- Relations: Al-Azem family Ismail Pasha al-Azem (brother)

Sulayman Pasha al-Azm (died August 1743) was the governor of Sidon Eyalet (1727–33), Damascus Eyalet (1733–38, 1741–43), and Egypt Eyalet (1739–40) under the Ottoman Empire. He belonged to the prominent Al-Azem family and was the uncle of As'ad Pasha al-Azm, who succeeded him as governor of Damascus, and Sa'deddin Pasha al-Azem, who also served as governor of Egypt.

== Early life ==
Sulayman Pasha al-Azm was the son of Ibrahim al-'Azm, "a rural notable, who was sent to Ma'arrat al-Nu'man to restore order in the mid-seventeenth century. Upon his father's death, Sulayman, alongside his brother Ismail Pasha al-Azm, completed their father's task and were rewarded by the Ottoman administration with hereditary tax farms in Homs, Hama and Ma'arrat al-Nu'man.

== Governorship of Damascus ==
Shortly after gaining the post of wali (governor) of Damascus Eyalet, a bread riot erupted in Damascus city during the winter of 1734. Because of al-Azm's perceived inaction during the riot, local mobs attacked grain storehouses that personally belonged to him. He responded quickly and had four demonstrators hanged, infuriating popular opinion in the city. When he left afterwards to fulfill his duties as amir al-hajj (commander of the Hajj caravan), "no one [on the caravan] greeted him." Later in 1734–1735, al-Azm improved his reputation by embarking on a campaign of energetic reforms, abolishing unspecified abuses that harmed local artisans. The abundant wheat harvest that spring was critical to his rehabilitation in the eyes of the people of Damascus.

Sulayman commanded the Hajj caravan for the final time beginning in December 1742 and returning to Damascus in April 1743. Later in 1743, another bread riot occurred in Damascus, with hungry mobs attacking the courthouse, driving out the qadi and storming local bakeries. Al-Azm attributed the uprising to the tampering of the food supply by the grain owners, millers, and wholesalers. He issued threats to the above individuals and bread reappeared on the market immediately. In a show of gratitude to al-Azm, "The people prayed for His Excellency [the Governor]." That same year al-Azm sponsored public celebrations upon the occasion of his son's circumcision. He decorated the markets and arranged for seven days and nights of singing, dancing, and other amusements. On the final day of celebrations, he staged a mass circumcision for poor youths and in an act of zakat ("charity"), he showered two gold coins and a new garment on each boy.

== Conflict with Daher al-Umar and death ==
Beginning in the 1730s, Daher al-Umar, an Arab sheikh, emerged as a local strongman in the Galilee (administratively part of Sidon Eyalet), which Sulayman Pasha had opposed while he was wali of Sidon between 1728 and 1730. In the late 1730s, shortly before his dismissal as wali of Damascus, Sulayman Pasha commenced an expedition against Daher in the latter's headquarters in Tiberias. Sulayman's justification for attacking Daher was that the latter was an ally of the Bedouin tribes that threatened the safety of the annual Hajj caravan and was a potential obstacle to the collection of taxes in the Galilee. The fortifications of Tiberias prevented the city's fall, but in the fighting outside of its walls, Daher's brother Salih "Abu Dani" was captured by Sulayman's allies and later hanged in Damascus.

During Sulayman's second term as wali of Damascus, he renewed the campaign against Daher, who by then expanded his control to Safad, Nazareth, and the western Galilee. On 3 September 1741, Sulayman departed Damascus to subdue Daher and assembled a coalition of local forces including Druze clans from Mount Lebanon, the clans of Jabal Nablus, Bani Saqr tribesmen, and the district governor of Jerusalem. Sulayman's coalition besieged Tiberias for nearly 90 days, but were unable to capture the city, whose defenses Daher had significantly reinforced.

Daher used the time during which Sulayman was away commanding the Hajj caravan to strengthen Tiberias and his minor fortresses such as Deir Hanna and Shefa-'Amr. In July 1743, after addressing internal matters in Damascus, Sulayman launched a third expedition against Daher with the authorization of Sultan Mahmud I and the backing of the provincial governors of Tripoli and Sidon, and the district governors of Jerusalem, Gaza, Ramla and Irbid in addition to his own troops. Sulayman also had the backing of the Mount Lebanon Druze, but their access to the Galilee was stifled by Daher's Shia Muslim allies in Jabal Amil. Sulayman decided to change tactics and assault Daher's lesser Galilee fortresses, from which Tiberias received reinforcements and resupply, to cut Tiberias off from the outside. However, these plans were voided when Sulayman suddenly fell ill and died in the village of Lubya near Tiberias in August. Sulayman's forces were subsequently attacked by Daher's forces and dispersed.

== See also ==
- Khan Sulayman Pasha
- al-Azm clan
- List of Ottoman governors of Damascus
- List of Ottoman governors of Egypt

== Bibliography ==
- Commins, David Dean (2004), Historical dictionary of Syria, Scarecrow Press, ISBN 978-0-8108-4934-1
- Douwes, Dick (2000), The Ottomans in Syria: a history of justice and oppression, I.B. Tauris, ISBN 1-86064-031-1
- Grehan, James (2007), Everyday life & consumer culture in 18th-century Damascus, University of Washington Press, ISBN 978-0-295-98676-0
- Joudah, Ahmad Hasan (1987), Revolt in Palestine in the Eighteenth Century: The Era of Shaykh Zahir Al-ʻUmar, Kingston Press, ISBN 978-0-940670-11-2

Political offices
Preceded by Ismail Pasha al-Azm	Wali of Tripoli; 1725–1727	Succeeded by
Preceded by Köprülü Abdullah Pasha	Wali of Sidon; 1728–1730	Succeeded by Ahmad Pasha Abu Tawq
Preceded by Abdullah Pasha al-Aydinli	Wali of Damascus; 1734–1738	Succeeded by Husayn Pasha al-Bustanji
Preceded by Ebubekir Pasha	Wali of Egypt; 1739–1740	Succeeded by Hekimoğlu Ali Pasha
Preceded by Abdi Pashazade Ali Pasha	Wali of Damascus; 1741–1743	Succeeded by As'ad Pasha al-Azm
