= Azm Palace (Hama) =

18th-century Ottoman palace in Hama, Syria

Coordinates: 35°8′2″N 36°45′13″E

- قصر العظم
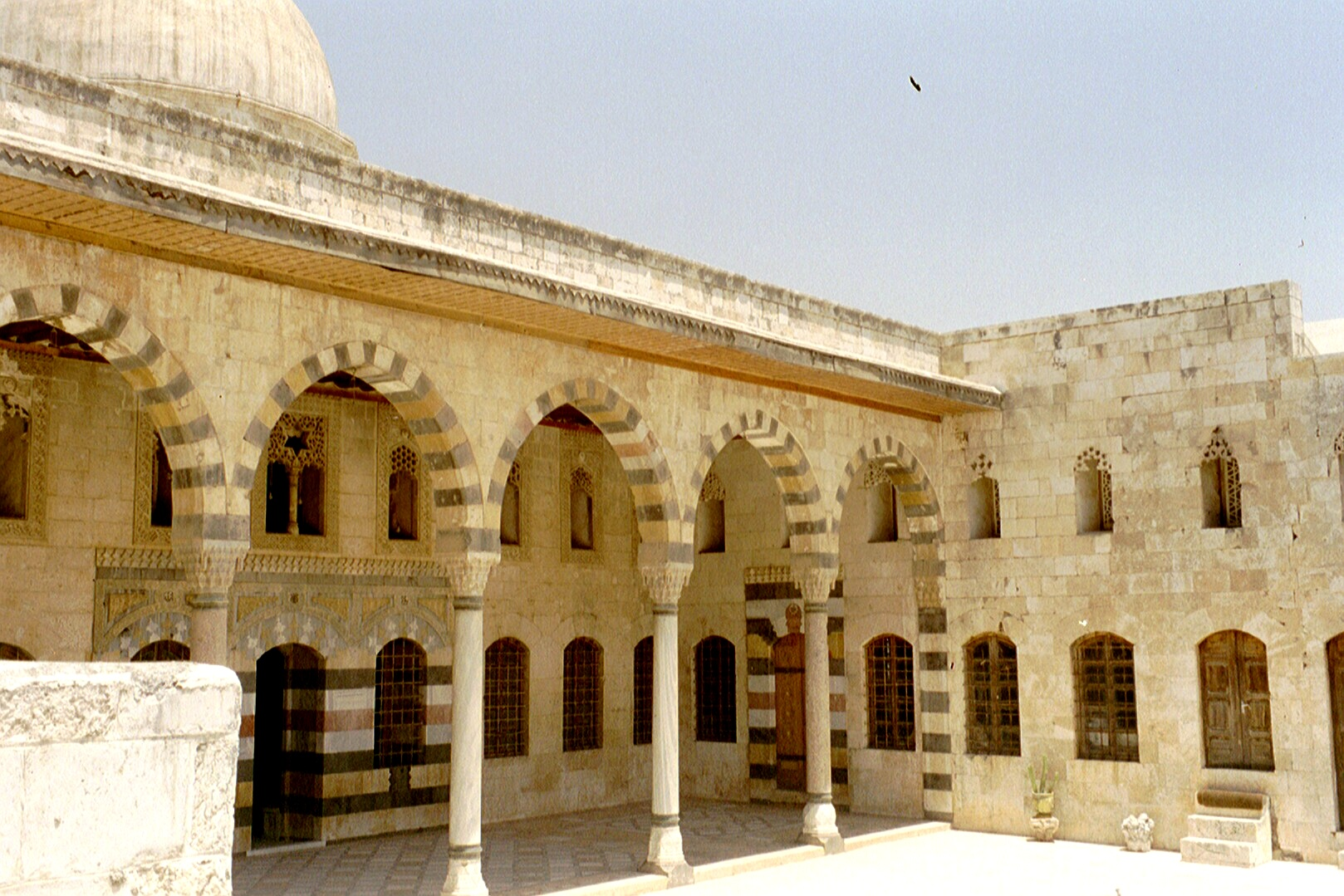
- Upper courtyard of the palace
- Interactive map of the Azm Palace area
- Alternative names: Qasr al-Azm

General information
- Type: Palace, museum
- Architectural style: Syrian
- Location: Hama, Syria, 400 meters (1,300 ft) south of the Hama Citadel
- Completed: 1742
- Client: As'ad Pasha al-Azm

Technical details
- Floor count: 2

The Azm Palace (Arabic: بيت العظم, Bayt al-ʿAẓm) is an 18th-century Ottoman-era palace in Hama, Syria at the center of the city on the banks of the Orontes River, about 400 meters (1,300 ft) south of the Hama Citadel. Ross Burns, author of Monuments of Syria (1999), reportedly considers the Azm Palace to be "one of the loveliest Ottoman residential buildings in Syria." The palace has been used as a regional archaeology museum since 1956.

== History ==
The Azm Palace at Hama was built in 1742 by the Ottoman governor, As'ad Pasha al-Azm, as his residence. It served the continuing line of Azm governors in Hama until the end of family rule in the 19th century.

A larger palace with the same basic plan, also known as the Azm Palace, was built in Damascus by As'ad Pasha when he became governor of that city in 1743.

The palace has been used as a museum since 1956. Extensively damaged during the 1982 Hama uprising, the palace has since been largely restored.

== Architecture ==
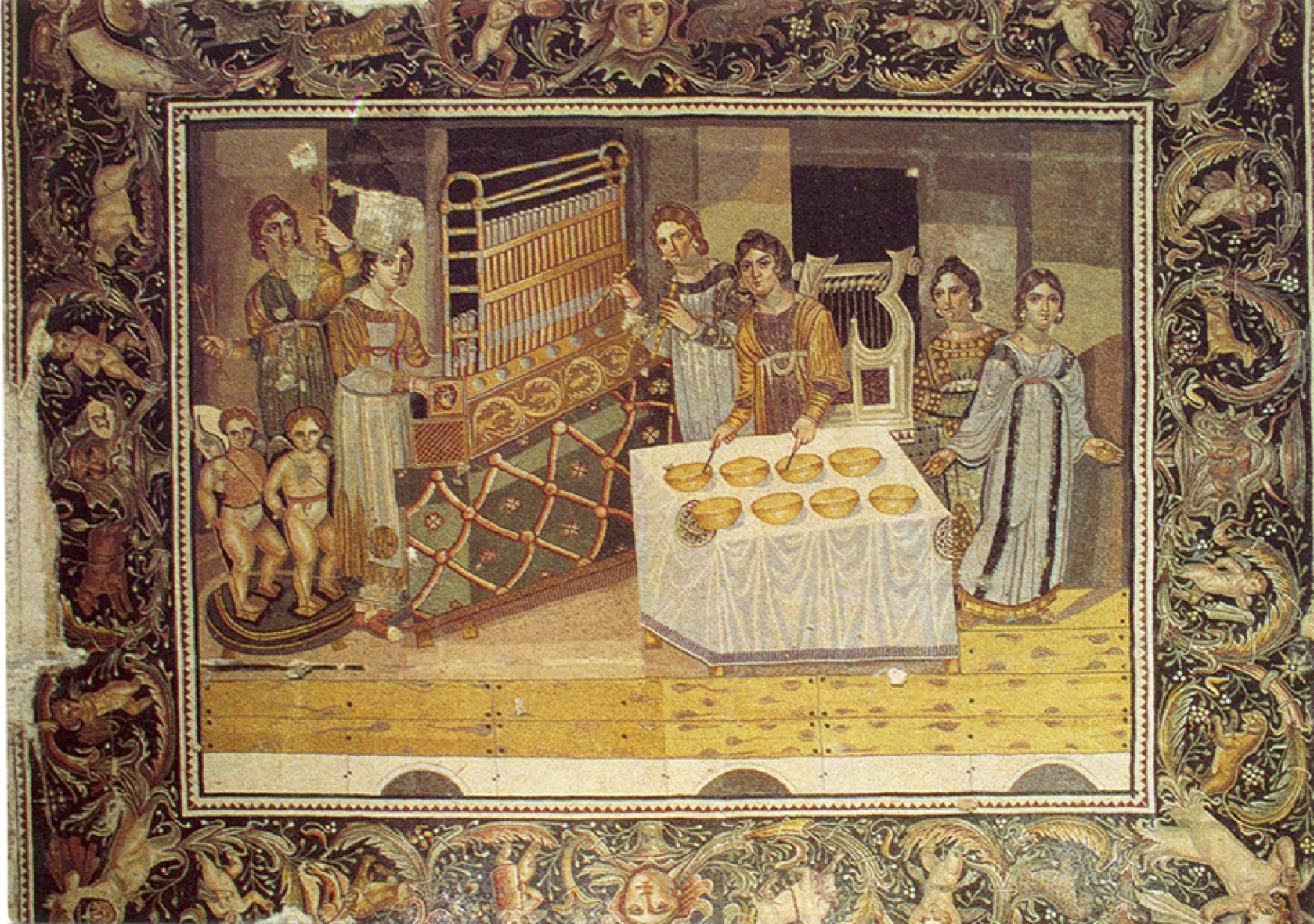
Late 4th century AD "Mosaic of the Musicians" with organ, double aulos, lyre, cymbals, and an eight-bowls oxyvaphi from a Roman villa in Maryamin, Syria.

Unlike al-Azm's palace in Damascus, the Azm Palace in Hama has courtyards on each of its two floors. The courtyard on the ground floor has a fountain in the middle and is decorated with trees planted to provide shade. A liwan with three sides is located at one end, to provide seating for residents. The purpose of the courtyard on the second floor is to make use of breezes and the cool air. Stairs lead to the upper courtyard, where there is a grand reception room; protecting the facade is an arched portico, while every surface inside the building is decorated with painted woodwork, banded stonework, and patterned marble. A large dome is built above the central area.

The other rooms inside are also decorated with both fountains and painted panels of birds and trees. In addition, the rooms that open into the upper courtyard contain "popular tradition" displays, with costumed mannequins depicting everyday scenes of Syrian life. Close to the entrance area is the Azm Palace's private hamaam ("bath"). However, the hamaam seems to have been available for use by the public.

The smaller courtyard at the lower floor served as the haramlek, or family and women's quarters. Burns says that the haramlek is particularly noteworthy. The palace has a single-floor guest wing on the western side, vaulted service quarters on the eastern side, and the second floor was the family residence. There is a direct entrance to the madafa and the southern liwan, which also gives passage to the service wing and the Azm family tomb.

== Museum ==
Since 1956, the palace has been housing a museum displaying archaeological finds from sites in and around Hama, including the citadel. A noteworthy exhibit is that of a late fourth century Roman mosaic depicting female musicians playing the organ, double aulos, forked and regular palm-held cymbals, kithara (a type of lyre), and an oxyvaphi (here consisting of eight yellow-coloured metal bowls played with two sticks).

== Gallery ==
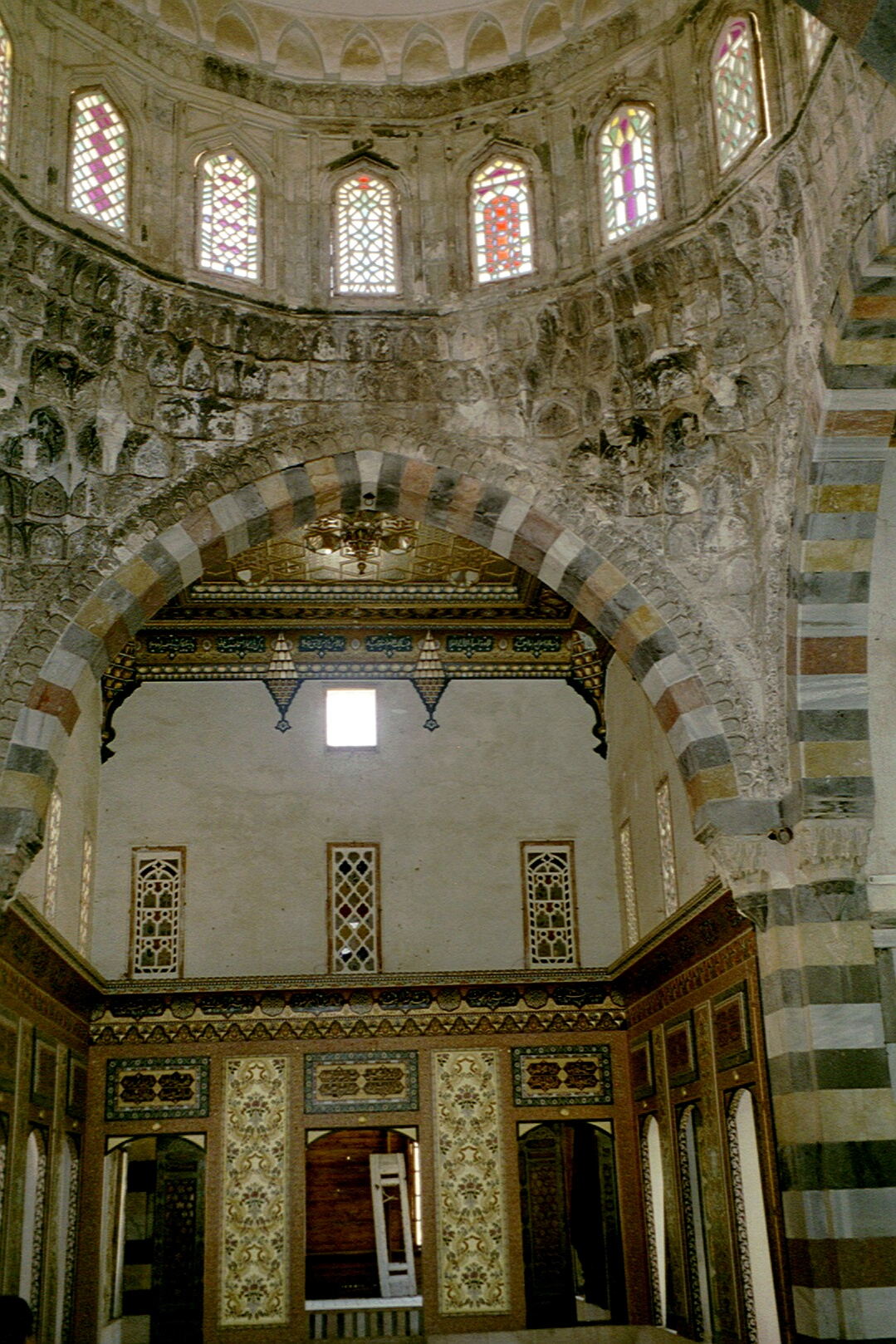
Grand reception room

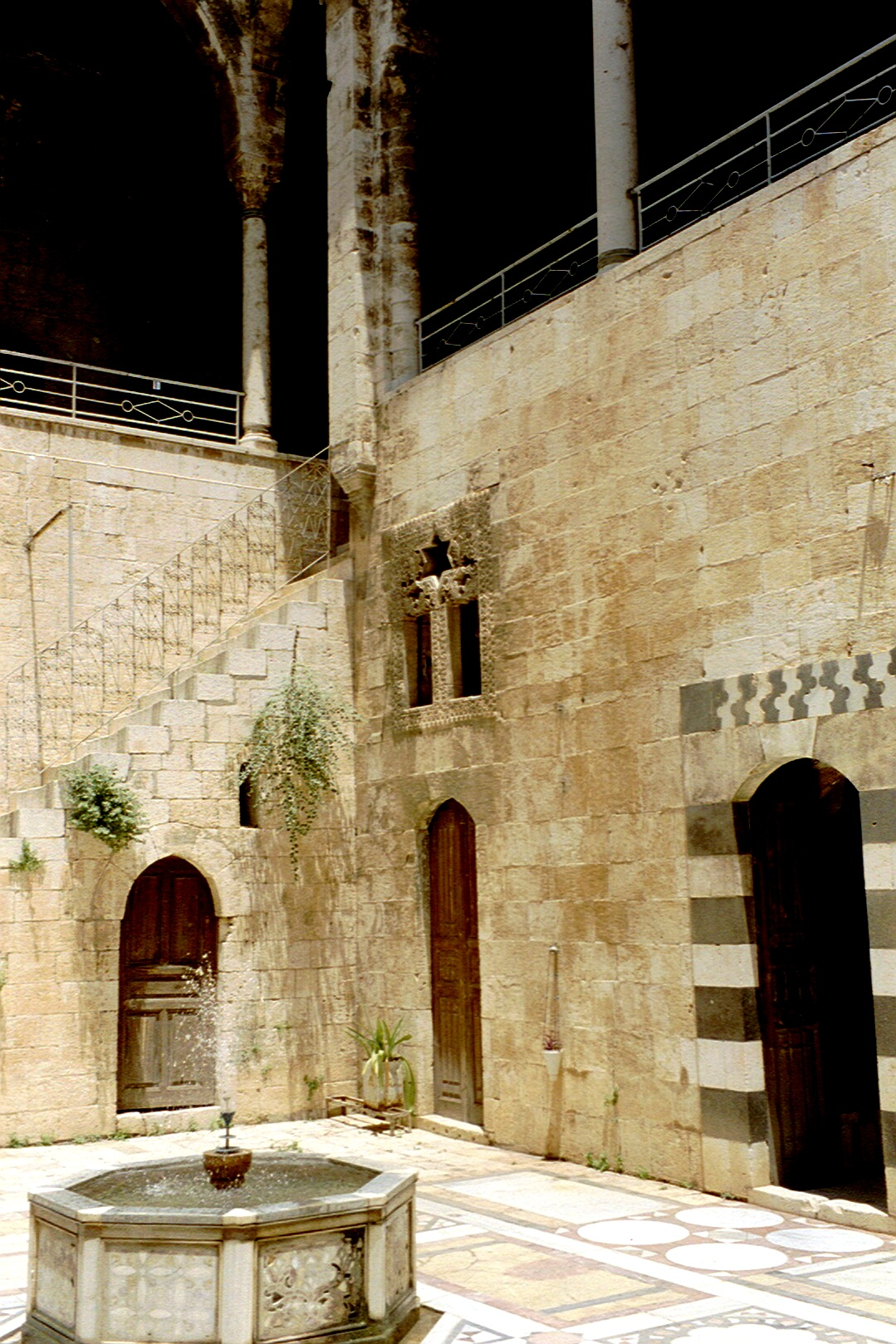
Lower courtyard of the palace, leading up to the upper courtyard

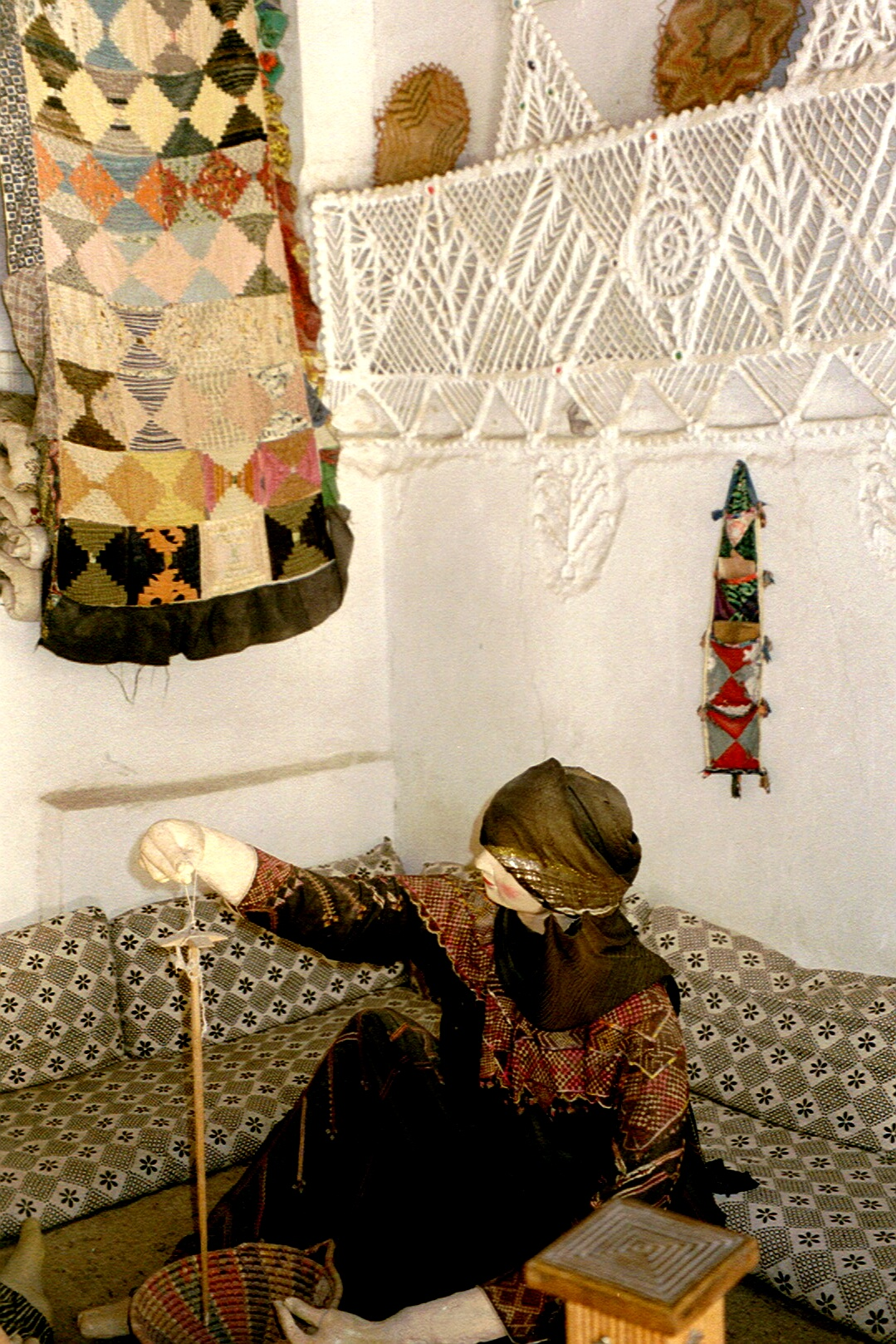
Mannequin display depicting traditional scene

== Bibliography ==
- Carter, Terry; Dunston, Lara; Thomas, Amelia (2008), Syria & Lebanon, Lonely Planet, ISBN 978-1-74104-609-0
- Mannheim, Ivan (2001), Syria & Lebanon Handbook: The Travel Guide, Footprint Travel Guides, ISBN 978-1-900949-90-3
- Nilsson, Alexandra; Fugmann, Ejnar (2002), Hama and Jabla: watercolours 1931-1961 by the Danish architect Ejnar Fugmann, Aarhus University Press, ISBN 87-7288-926-8
- Ragette, Friedrich (2003), Traditional domestic architecture of the Arab Region, Edition Axel Menges, ISBN 3-932565-30-4
- Beatti, Andrew (1996). Ring, Trudy (ed.). Hama, Syria. Vol. 4: Middle East and Africa. Fitzroy Dearborn Publishers. p. 318. ISBN 1-884964-03-6.
