= Sa'deddin Pasha al-Azm =

Ottoman governor (died 1762)

Sa'deddin Pasha al-Azm (Turkish: Azmzâde Sa'deddin Paşa; died 1762, Raqqa) was an Ottoman statesman. He served as the Ottoman governor of Aleppo (1750–52), Sidon (1752, 1757–58/59), Tripoli (Lebanon) (1752–57), Egypt (1757), Marash (1757, 1760), Jeddah (1758/59–60), Konya (1760–61), Rakka (1761–62), and Baghdad (1762; never took office).

He was born to Ismail Pasha al-Azm, a member of the prominent Al-Azm family. His brother was As'ad Pasha al-Azm and his uncle was Süleyman Pasha al-Azm.

== See also ==
- Al-Azm family
- List of Ottoman governors of Egypt

Political offices
| Preceded by Hekimoğlu Ali Pasha | Ottoman Governor of Egypt; 1757 | Succeeded by Yirmisekizzade Mehmed Said Pasha |
