= Kaplan Pasha =

Kaplan Mataraci Pasha (transliterated from Arabic as Qublan Pasha ibn al-Mataraji) was the Ottoman governor of Sidon in 1698–1703.

== Life ==
Kaplan Pasha was a probable descendant of a janissary based in Latakia, Matarci Ali, who died in 1666 and whose descendants remained in Latakia. When Kaplan's brother, Arslan Pasha, was appointed the governor of Tripoli Eyalet, he appointed Kaplan the governor of the Latakia Sanjak. He is mentioned as the governor of Tripoli in mid-September 1697 in a letter by the Sufi traveler Abd al-Ghani al-Nabulsi. In 1698, Kaplan was appointed by the imperial Ottoman government the governor of Sidon Eyalet, a post he held until 1703.

In 1698 or 1699 Kaplan Pasha was appointed the amir al-hajj (commander of the Hajj pilgrim caravan), replacing the governor of Damascus, Ahmed Pasha Salih Pashazade, who was executed by Sultan Mustafa II.

Kaplan Pasha's son, Mehmed Bey, governed Latakia in the early 18th century. He was accused of a host of injustices, including "oppressing the poor", "confiscating tobacco stores" in a government document, but could not be dislodged from his saray (government house) in the city.

== Bibliography ==
- Akkach, Samer (2010). Letters of a Sufi Scholar: The Correspondence of ʻAbd Al-Ghanī Al-Nābulusī (1641-1731). Leiden and Boston: Brill. ISBN 978-90-04-17102-2.
- Barbir, Karl K. (1980). Ottoman Rule in Damascus, 1708–1758. Princeton University Press. ISBN 9781400853205.
- Joudah, Ahmad Hasan (2013). Revolt in Palestine in the Eighteenth Century: The Era of Shaykh Zahir al-Umar (Second ed.). Gorgias Press. ISBN 978-1-4632-0002-2.
- Winter, Stefan (2010). The Shiites of Lebanon under Ottoman Rule, 1516–1788. Cambridge University Press. ISBN 9781139486811.
- Winter, Stefan (2016). A History of the 'Alawis: From Medieval Aleppo to the Turkish Republic. Princeton and Oxford: Princeton University Press. ISBN 9780691173894.
