= Sidon Eyalet =

Administrative division of the Ottoman Empire from 1660 to 1864

Coordinates: 33.55°N 35.3833°E

Arabic: إيالة صيدا Ottoman Turkish: ایالت صیدا
- Eyalet of the Ottoman Empire
- 1660–1864
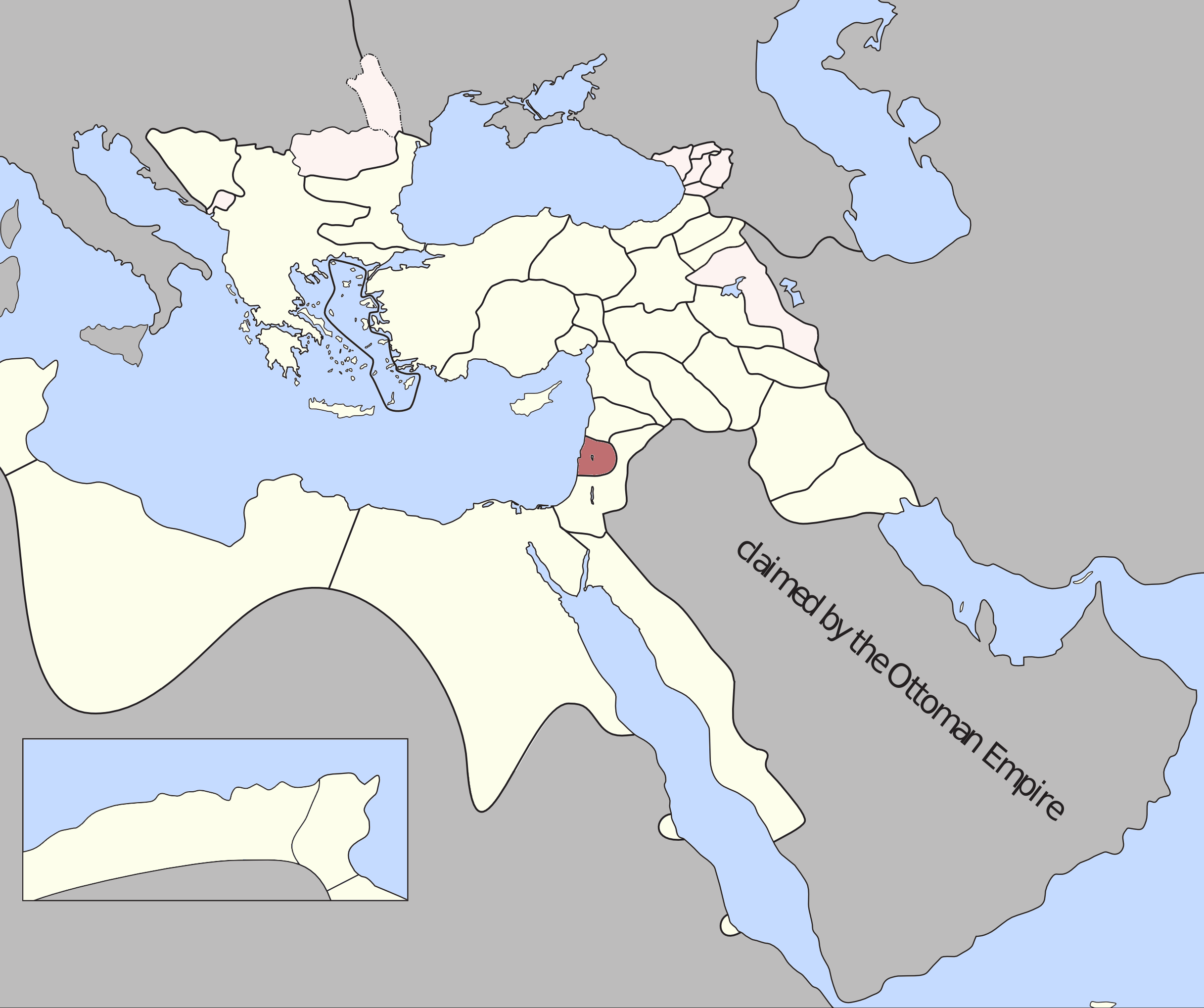
- The Sidon Eyalet in 1795
- Capital: Safed (1660); Sidon (1660–1775); Acre (1775–1841); Beirut (1841–1864)
- History
  - Established: 1660
  - Disestablished: 1864
Preceded by	Succeeded by
Damascus Eyalet	Beirut Vilayet; Syria Vilayet
- Today part of: Lebanon; Israel; Palestine

The Eyalet of Sidon (Ottoman Turkish: ایالت صیدا, romanized: Eyālet-i Ṣaydā; Arabic: إيالة صيدا) was an eyalet (also known as a beylerbeylik) of the Ottoman Empire. In the 19th century, the eyalet extended from the border with Egypt to the Bay of Kisrawan, including parts of modern Israel and Lebanon.

Depending on the location of its capital, it was also known as the Eyalet of Safad, Beirut or Acre.

== Background ==
Ottoman rulers considered creating the province as early as 1585. The districts of Beirut-Sidon and Safed (encompassing much of the Galilee) were united under the rule of Ma'nid emir Fakhr al-Din Ma'n.

== History ==
=== Creation ===
The province was briefly created during Fakhr al-Din's exile in 1614–1615, and recreated in 1660. The province continued to be subordinated in some ways, both in fiscal and political matters, to the Damascus province out of which it was created.

Despite conflicts in the 1660s, the Ma'n family "played the leading role in the management of the internal affairs of this eyalet until the closing years of the 17th century, perhaps because it was not possible to manage the province-certainly not in the sanjak of Sidon-Beirut-without them."

=== Late 17th to 18th century ===
The Ma'ns were succeeded by the Shihab family in ruling the mountainous interior of Sidon-Beirut from the final years of the 17th century through the 19th century. The governor of Sidon's rule also remained nominal in the Safed sanjak as well, where in the 18th century different local chiefs, mainly the sheikhs of the Zaydan family in the Galilee and the sheikhs of the Shia clans of Ali al-Saghir, Munkar, and Sa'b families in Jabal Amil. Even the coastal towns of Sidon, Beirut, and Acre were farmed out to the Sidon-based Hammud family. By the late 1720s, Beirut and its tax farm also went over to the Shihabs under Emir Haydar, while Acre and its tax farm came under the rule of the Zaydani sheikh Daher al-Umar in the mid-1740s.

In 1775, when Jezzar Ahmed Pasha received the governorship of Sidon, he moved the capital to Acre. In 1799, Acre resisted a siege by Napoleon Bonaparte.

=== Early and mid-19th century ===
As part of the Egyptian–Ottoman War of 1831–33, Ibrahim Pasha of Egypt took Acre after a severe siege on May 27, 1832. The Egyptian occupation intensified rivalries between Druzes and Maronites, as Ibrahim Pasha openly favoured Christians in his administration and his army. In 1840, the governor of Sidon moved his residence to Beirut, effectively making it the new capital of the eyalet. After the return to Ottoman rule in 1841, the Druzes dislodged Bashir III al-Shihab, to whom the sultan had granted the title of emir.

In 1842 the Ottoman government introduced the Double Kaymakamate, whereby Mount Lebanon would be governed by a Maronite appointee and the more southerly regions of Kisrawan and Shuf would be governed by a Druze. Both would remain under the indirect rule of the governor of Sidon. This partition of Lebanon proved to be a mistake. Animosities between the religious sects increased, and by 1860 they escalated into a full-blown sectarian violence. In the 1860 Lebanon conflict that followed, thousands of Christians were killed in massacres that culminated with the Damascus Riots of July 1860.

=== Dissolution ===
Following the international outcry caused by the massacres, the French landed troops in Beirut and the Ottomans abolished the unworkable system of the Kaymakamate and instituted in its place the Mutasarrifate of Mount Lebanon, a Maronite-majority district to be governed by non-Lebanese Christian mutasarrıf, which was the direct predecessor of the political system that continued to exist in Lebanon's early post-independence years. The new arrangement ended the turmoil, and the region prospered in the last decades of the Ottoman Empire.

== Administrative divisions ==
Sidon Eyalet consisted of two sanjaks in the 17th century:

1. Sidon-Beirut Sanjak
2. Safad Sanjak

By the start of the 18th century, Sidon Eyalet was not divided into sanjaks and third-level kazas (judicial districts) as most other eyalets, including neighboring Damascus, were administratively divided at the time. Instead, Sidon comprised several smaller, fiscal districts, most commonly called muqata'as in the contemporary government documents, and less commonly referred to as nahiyes. There were several, mostly insignificant changes to the territorial jurisdictions of the muqata'as throughout the century but for the most part, the province comprised the following muqata'as:

1. Beirut (town)
2. Jabal al-Shuf (e.g. Druze-dominated, southern half of Mount Lebanon)
3. Sidon (town)
4. Iqlim al-Tuffah (southeast of Sidon)
5. Iqlim al-Shumar
6. Iqlim al-Shaqif(area around Shaqif Arnun castle)
7. Tyre (town)
8. Bilad Bishara
9. Sahil Akka (coastal plain of Acre)
10. Acre (town)
11. Safed and Rama (these had been separate muqata'as but were merged by the governor Jazzar Pasha in 1777)
12. Jira (countryside of Safed; sometimes, this district was called 'Jira and Tarshiha')
13. Shefa-Amr and Nazareth (these had been separate muqata'as but were merged by Jazzar Pasha in 1777)
14. Haifa and Yajur (these had been part of the Damascus Eyalet, but were appended to Sidon in 1723. They were later re-appended, in name only, to Damascus in the 1760–1762, but were afterward restored to Sidon)
15. Sahil Atlit (the Atlit coast south of Haifa was effectively annexed from Damascus, without imperial sanction, by the powerful tax farmer, Daher al-Umar, in the late 1750s, and became officially part of Sidon during Jazzar Pasha's governorship, 1776–1804)
16. Marj Ayyun (appended to Sidon during Jazzar Pasha's governorship)

Subdvisions of Sidon Eyalet in 1700-1740:

1. Safed-Sayda-Beyrut Sanjak
2. Nablus Sanjak
3. Cebel-i Aclûn Sanjak
4. Nahiye-i Vadiü'l-Heym Sanjak
5. Tedmir Sanjak
6. Kerek-i Şevbek Sanjak

Sidon Eyalet consisted of seven sanjaks (districts) in the early 19th century:

1. Acre Sanjak
2. Beirut Sanjak
3. Sidon Sanjak
4. Tyre Sanjak
5. Nablus Sanjak
6. Nazareth Sanjak
7. Tiberias Sanjak

== Governors ==
Governors of the eyalet:

- Abidin Pasha (1685)
- Kavanoz Ahmed Pasha (1691/92 – 1694/95)
- Qublan Pasha al-Matarji (1700–1703)
- Arslan Pasha al-Matarji (1703–1706)
- Bashir Pasha al-Matarji (1706–1712)
- Uthman Pasha Abu Tawq (1712–1715)
- Bashir Pasha al-Matarji (1715–1717)
- Uthman Pasha Abu Tawq (1717–1718)
- Genç Ahmed Pasha (1716–1718)
- Damat Hafiz Ahmed Pasha (November 1722 – 1723/24; 1st term)
- Ahmad Pasha Abu Tawq (1723–1725)
- Uthman Pasha Abu Tawq (1725–1726)
- Köprülü Abdullah Pasha (1726/27–1728)
- Sulayman Pasha al-Azm (1728–1730)
- Ahmad Pasha Abu Tawq (1730–1734)
- Sa'deddin Pasha al-Azm (1734–1737)
- Ibrahim Pasha al-Azm (1737–1741)
- As'ad Pasha al-Azm (1741–1742)
- Yaqub Pasha (1742)
- Ibrahim Pasha al-Azm (1742–1744)
- Sa'deddin Pasha al-Azm (1744–1748)
- Uthman Pasha al-Muhassil (1748–1750)
- Mustafa Pasha al-Qawwas (1750–1752)
- Sa'deddin Pasha al-Azm (1752–1753)
- Mustafa Pasha al-Qawwas (1754–1755)
- Mustafa Pasha al-Azm (1755–1756)
- Sa'deddin Pasha al-Azm (1756–1759)
- Nu'man Pasha (1760–1763)
- Muhammad Pasha al-Azm (1763–1770)
- Darwish Pasha al-Kurji (1770–1771)
- Daher al-Umar (1771–1775) (de facto)
- Rajab Pasha (1772) (de jure)
- Malak Muhammad Pasha (1775) (de jure)
- Jezzar Pasha (1775–1804)
- Sulayman Pasha al-Adil (1804–1819)
- Bashir Shihab (1819) (de facto)
- Abdullah Pasha (1820–1822)
- Darwish Mehmed Pasha (1822) (de jure)
- Mustafa Pasha (1822–1823) (de jure)
- Abdullah Pasha (1823–1832)
- Egyptian rule (27 May 1832 – 10 October 1840)
  - Husayn Abd al-Hadi (1833 – pre-1840)
- Köse Ahmed Zekeriya Pasha (November 1840 – March 1841)
- Eneste/Haseki Mehmed Selim Pasha (March 1841 – December 1841)
- Izzet Ahmed Pasha (December 1841 – July 1842)
- Mustafa Pasha (1842)
- Selim Pasha (1842)
- Ömer Pasha (Mihaylo Lattas) (1842 – 7 December 1842)
- Ayasli Asad Mehmed Muhlis Pasha (August 1842 – 9 April 1845)
- Yozgatli Mehmed Vecihi Pasha (9 April 1845 – January 1846)
- Mühendis Mehmed Kamil Pasha (January 1846 – September 1847)
- Mustafa Sherifi Pasha (September 1847 – July 1848)
- Salih Vamık Pasha (August 1848 – September 1851; 1st term)
- Pepe Mehmed Emin Pasha (September 1851 – September 1852)
- Salih Vamık Pasha (September 1852 – March 1855; 2nd term)
- Mahmud Nedim Pasha (March 1855 – December 1855)
- Salih Vamık Pasha (December 1855 – July 1857; 3rd term)
- Arnavud Mehmed Kurshid Pasha (June 1857 – 17 July 1860)
- Fuad Pasha (17 July 1860 – 9 June 1861)
- Charles-Marie-Napoléon de Beaufort d'Hautpoul (16 August 1860 – 5 July 1861; de facto as part of the French expedition in Syria)
- Kayserili Ahmed Pasha (1860–1863)
- Mehmed Kabuli Pasha (1863–1864)
- Mehmed Kurshid Pasha (1864–1865)

== See also ==
- Sidon
- Mount Lebanon Emirate
- History of Lebanon under Ottoman rule

== Bibliography ==
- Abu-Husayn, Abdul-Rahim (1992). "Problems in the Ottoman Administration in Syria during the 16th and 17th Centuries: The Case of the Sanjak of Sidon-Beirut". International Journal of Middle East Studies. 24 (4): 665–675. doi:10.1017/S002074380002239X. S2CID 159670509.
- Agoston, Gabor; Masters, Bruce Alan (2009). Encyclopedia of the Ottoman Empire. Infobase Publishing. ISBN 978-1-4381-1025-7.
- Cohen, Amnon (1973). Palestine in the 18th Century: Patterns of Government and Administration. Jerusalem: The Magnes Press. ISBN 978-0-19-647903-3.
- Firro, Kais (1992). A History of the Druzes. BRILL. ISBN 978-90-04-09437-6.
- Joudah, Ahmad Hasan (2013). Revolt in Palestine in the Eighteenth Century: The Era of Shaykh Zahir al-Umar (Second ed.). Gorgias Press. ISBN 978-1-4632-0002-2.
- Macgregor, John (1850). Commercial statistics: A digest of the productive resources, commercial legislation, customs tariffs, of all nations. Whittaker and co.
- McLeod, Walter (1858). The Geography of Palestine. Longman, Brown, Green, Longmans, & Roberts.
- Rood, Judith Mendelsohn (2004). Sacred Law in the Holy City: The Khedival Challenge To The Ottomans As Seen From Jerusalem, 1829–1841. Brill. ISBN 9004138102.
- Süreyya, Mehmet (1996) [1890]. Nuri Akbayar; Seyit A. Kahraman (eds.). Sicill-i Osmanî (in Turkish). Beşiktaş, Istanbul: Türkiye Kültür Bakanlığı and Türkiye Ekonomik ve Toplumsal Tarih Vakfı. ISBN 9789753330411.
- Winter, Stefan (2010). The Shiites of Lebanon under Ottoman rule, 1516–1788. Cambridge University Press. ISBN 978-0-521-76584-8.
