= As'ad Pasha al-Azm =

Ottoman governor of Damascus from 1743 to 1757

Wali of Damascus
- In office 1743–1757
- Monarchs: Mahmud I Osman III
- Preceded by: Sulayman Pasha al-Azm
- Succeeded by: Husayn Pasha ibn Makki

Personal details
- Born: c. 1706 Maarrat al-Nu'man, Ottoman Syria
- Died: March 1758; 1757 according to Turkish sources Mediterranean Sea; Ankara according to Turkish sources
- Relations: Al-Azm family
- Children: Muhammad Pasha al-Azm
- Parent: Ismail Pasha al-Azm (father)

As'ad Pasha al-Azm (c. 1706 – March 1758) was the governor of Damascus under Ottoman rule from 1743 to his deposition in 1757. He was responsible for the construction of several architectural works in the city and other places in Syria.

== Background ==
Born in 1706 in Maarrat al-Nu'man, Ottoman Syria, Asad was the grandson of Ibrahim al-'Azm, "a rural notable, who was sent to Ma'arrat al-Nu'man to restore order in the mid-seventeenth century; upon his grandfather's death, Asad's father, Ismail Pasha al-Azm, and uncle, Sulayman Pasha al-Azm, completed their father's task and were rewarded by the Ottoman administration with hereditary tax farms in Homs, Hama and Ma'arrat al-Nu'man. Hence, the Al-Azm family came to control much of the provinces of Ottoman Syria in 1725. One of his brothers was Sa'deddin Pasha al-Azm. As'ad governed Hama as a tax collector for a number of years, until his uncle, Sulayman Pasha al-Azm, governor of Damascus, died in 1743. In Hama, he built the Azm Palace where he resided.

== Governor of Damascus ==
As'ad Pasha succeeded his father as governor of Damascus in 1743. Throughout the first half of the 18th century, the janissary corps in Damascus challenged the al-Azm family rule in Damascus, but in 1746, As'ad Pasha crushed the local janissaries. This enabled him to secure his authority in the city.

He was favored by the Ottoman authorities in Istanbul because of his successes in the protection of the Syrian pilgrim caravan that annually left for Mecca and Medina during the Hajj. In his dealings with the Bedouin tribes along the caravan route in the Syrian Desert and the Hejaz, As'ad Pasha either utilized force to subdue them or bought them off. The security of the pilgrim caravan was of prime importance to the Ottoman sultan in his capacity as "Protector of the Two Holy Sanctuaries," especially after the consistent failure of the Janissaries to protect the caravan.

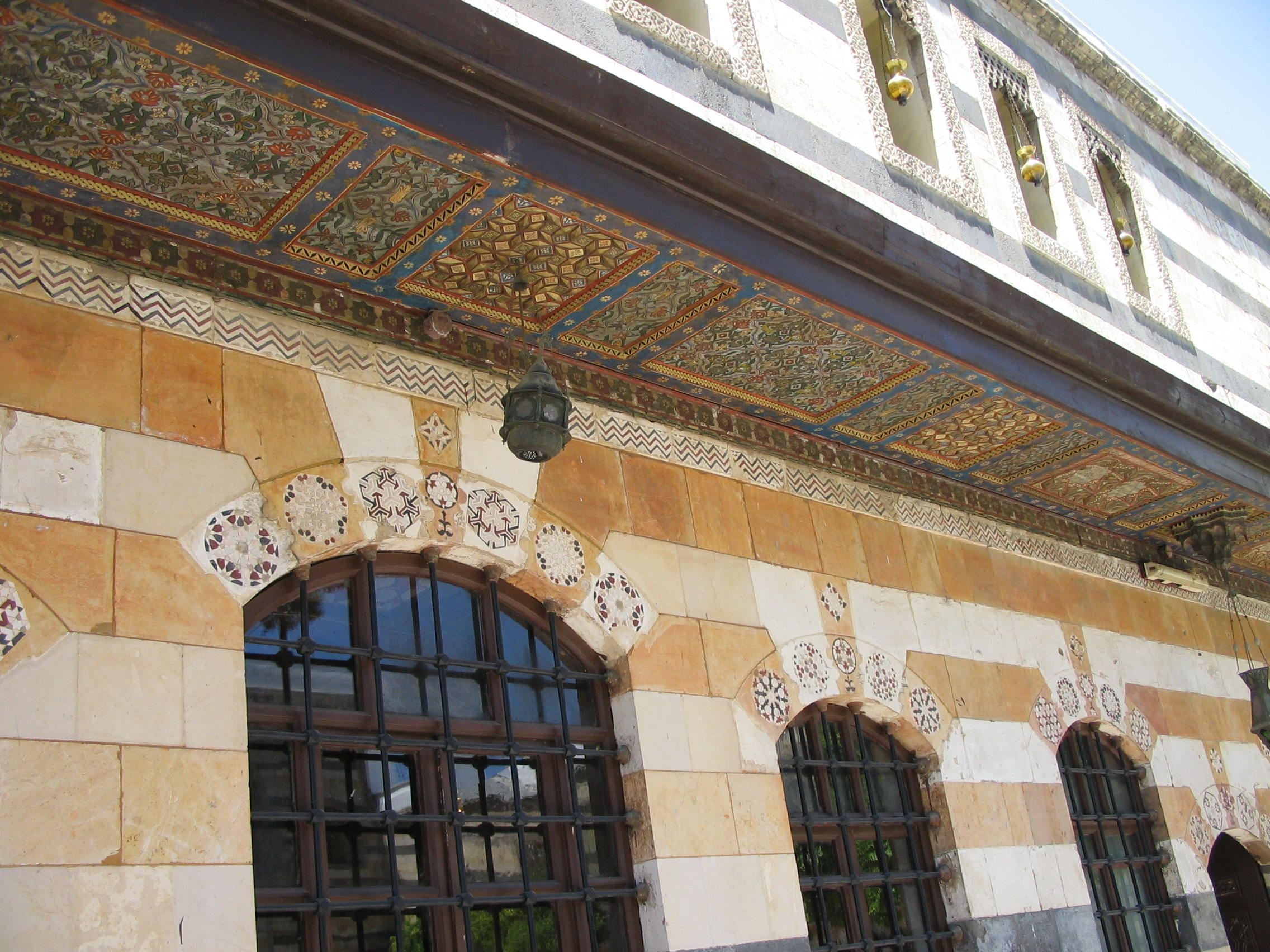
Architecture of the Azm Palace built in 1751 under the patronage of As'ad Pasha al-Azm

In 1750, a feudal conflict erupted when a Kurdish man was allegedly murdered by a Baghdadi, in revenge, armed Kurds stormed through al-Darwishiyya and Bab al-Jabiyah in a vain search for Baghdadi scapegoats. When two Baghdadis were murdered several weeks later, a group of their brethren, together with immigrants from Mosul and allies from local military units, appeared outside Khan al-Akrad (‘Khan of the Kurds’) and provoked a heated gunfight in which several men were killed and wounded. Frustrated in their attempt to take the khan, they attacked nearby coffeehouses associated with the Kurds and might have done even more damage if As'ad Pasha al-Azm had not personally intervened and prevented the conflict from spiraling out of control.

When locust swarms devastated the harvests of interior Syria, As'ad Pasha used it as a pretext to launch raids against Druze communities in the Bekaa Valley, plundering their crops which he placed on the market in Damascus. During his governorship, As'ad Pasha relaxed restraints on Arab Christians; for instance, he allowed them to drink alcohol in public. He used his family's great wealth to construct the Azm Palace in Damascus in 1750. Serving as a joint residence and guesthouse, the palace was a monument to 18th-century Arab architecture. The famed Khan As'ad Pasha was also built under As'ad Pasha's patronage in 1752. His rule represented the apex of al-Azm influence in the Levant as at that time, the members of the family administered Damascus, Aleppo, Hama, Tripoli, Sidon, and for a short period, Mosul.

Despite As'ad Pasha's ability to secure the pilgrim caravan, the new Ottoman authorities in Istanbul deposed him in 1757, after he had governed for fourteen years. The Grand Vizier of the Ottoman Empire, Raghib Pasha, denounced him as a "peasant son of a peasant" after a deal between the two of them faltered. In addition, the kizlar agha of Istanbul, Aboukouf, was disdainful toward As'ad Pasha for not catering to him properly when he passed through Damascus as part of the Hajj caravan. The Ottoman state was also interested in confiscating the great wealth As'ad Pasha accumulated during his tenure in office. The large amounts of money collected made the state revalue its currency. As'ad Pasha was initially replaced by Husayn Pasha ibn Makki, a protégé of Aboukouf.

== Death ==
After being deposed, As'ad Pasha was assigned to Aleppo Eyalet and a month after, was appointed Governor of Egypt. In late 1757, the Hajj pilgrim caravan was annihilated. The Ottomans accused As'ad Pasha of inciting the Bedouin to attack the caravan in response to his deposition earlier that year. Consequently, Grand Vizier Raghib Pasha ordered As'ad Pasha's execution. There are different stories about his death. One story is that As'ad Pasha was executed in March 1758 aboard a ship ostensibly transporting him to Crete where would live in exile. However, there is a tomb in Ankara known in Turkish as the Azimi (İsmail Paşazade Hacı Esad) Türbesi which is his likely resting place given the matching names - his and his father's - and the inscription on the tombstone which states that he was the Haj Emir for 14 years. The year of his death on the tombstone reads 1171 which is likely to be in the Hijri year, corresponding to 1757 in the Gregorian calendar. According to the Encyclopedia of Islam of the Turkey Religious Foundation, he was appointed governor of Aleppo on January 21, 1757. On September 25, 1757, he was appointed governor of Sivas and exiled to Ruse, Bulgaria in the same year. As'ad Pasha's exile, first to Sivas and then to Ruse, appears to be related to the Bedouin attack in September 1757, which resulted in the deaths of 20,000 pilgrims, including the sultan's sister. As'ad Pasha, who had arrived in Ankara en route to Ruse, was executed there. According to this account, his head was taken to Istanbul and buried in the Tunusbağı cemetery in Üsküdar. A Georgian mamluk (slave soldier) of As'ad Pasha, Uthman Pasha al-Kurji, then led Ottoman authorities to the whereabouts of his master's treasures and was rewarded with the governorship of Damascus in 1760.

== Bibliography ==
- Carter, Terry; Dunston, Lara; Humphreys, Andrew (2004). Syria & Lebanon. Lonely Planet. p. 300. ISBN 978-1-86450-333-3. "Homs Syria sister cities."
- Choueri, Youssef M. (2005). A Companion to the History of the Middle East. Wiley-Blackwell. ISBN 978-1-4051-0681-8.
- Commins, David Dean (2004). Historical dictionary of Syria. Scarecrow Press. ISBN 978-0-8108-4934-1.
- Grehan, James (2007). Everyday life & consumer culture in 18th-century Damascus. University of Washington Press. ISBN 978-0-295-98676-0.
- Joudah, Ahmad Hasan (1987). Revolt in Palestine in the Eighteenth Century: The Era of Shaykh Zahir Al-ʻUmar. Kingston Press. ISBN 9780940670112.
- Ring, Trudy; Salkin, Robert M.; Schellinger, Paul E. (1994). International Dictionary of Historic Places. Taylor & Francis. ISBN 978-1-884964-03-9.
- Salzmann, Ariel (2004). Tocqueville in the Ottoman Empire: rival paths to the modern state. BRILL. ISBN 978-90-04-10887-5.

Regnal titles
Preceded by Sulayman Pasha al-Azm	Wali of Damascus; 1742–1757	Succeeded by Husayn Pasha ibn Makki
