= Al-Azm family =

Syrian political family

Al-Azm family آل العظم (ʾĀl al-ʿAẓm)
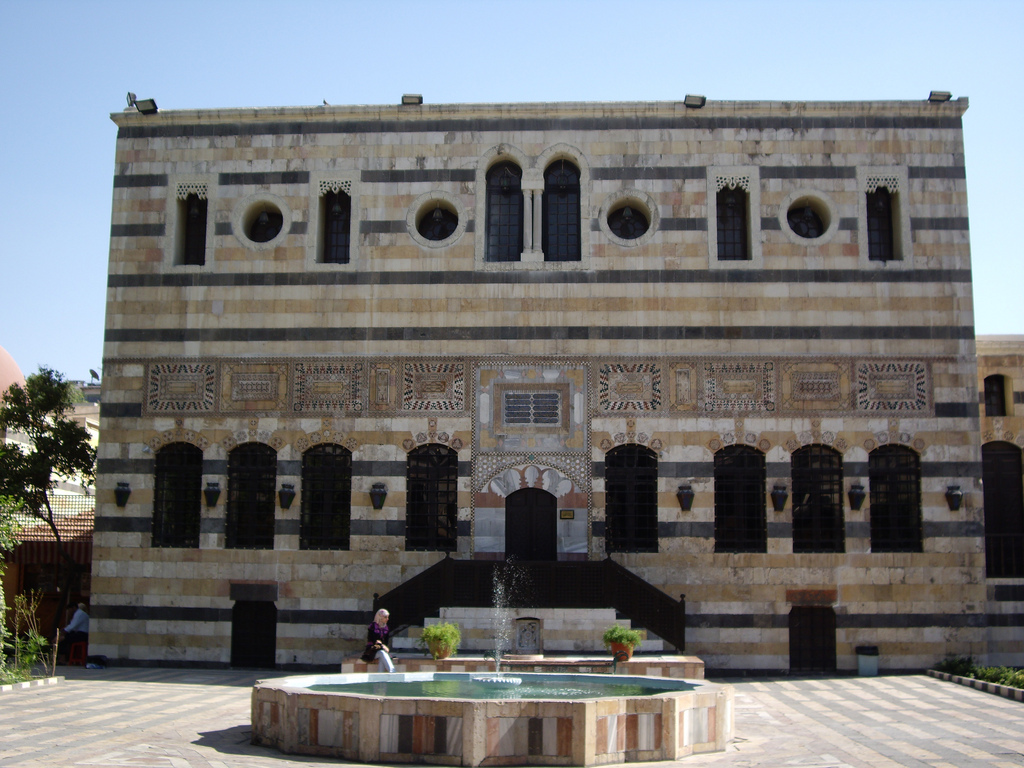
- Azm Palace in Damascus
- Current region: Damascus, Hama
- Origin: Syria
- Members: Sulayman Pasha al-Azm; As'ad Pasha al-Azm; Sa'deddin Pasha al-Azm; Muhammad Pasha al-Azm; Abdullah Pasha al-Azm; Azmzade Sadik Al Mouayad; Haqqi al-Azm; Khalid al-Azm; Sadiq Jalal al-Azm
- Estates: Azm Palace of Damascus (nationalized); Azm Palace of Hama (nationalized)

Al-Azm family (Arabic: آل العظم ʾĀl al-ʿAẓm) is a prominent Damascene family. Their political influence in Ottoman Syria began in the 18th century when members of the family administered Maarrat al-Nu'man and Hama. A scion of the family, Ismail Pasha al-Azm, was appointed wāli of Damascus Eyalet in 1725. Between 1725 and 1783, members of the family, including As'ad Pasha al-Azm, held power in Damascus for 47 years, in addition to periodical appointments in Sidon Eyalet, Tripoli Eyalet, Hama, Aleppo Eyalet, and Egypt Eyalet. The family's influence declined in the 19th century, failing to establish a true dynasty.

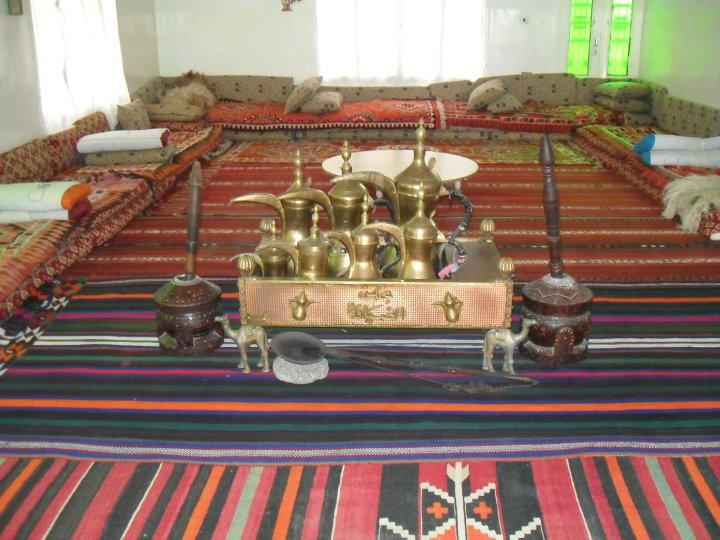
Diwan Al-Azm in Samma

== Origins ==
The origins of the Azm family are relatively obscure and evidence has been described as "contradictory and generally unsatisfactory." One of the most prominent families in Ottoman Syria, the Al-Azm's are of Arab origin from the region of Hauran according to Abd al-Rahman al-Fasi, or they may have originated from the region of Konya in Anatolia; hence, their roots in Turkey may shed light on recruitment and career patterns of the family members who held high positions as Ottoman officers in the Syrian provinces. The Al-Azm's began to emerge as a major influence in the region when Ibrahim al-'Azm, "a rural notable possibly of Turkish stock", went to Ma'arrat al-Nu'man to restore order in the mid-seventeenth century. Upon his death, Ibrahim al-'Azm's sons, Ismail Pasha al-Azm and Sulayman Pasha al-Azm, completed their father's task and were rewarded by the Ottoman administration with hereditary tax farms in Homs, Hama and Ma'arrat al-Nu'man.

Jean-Pierre Rondas described Sadiq Jalal al-Azm and his family as Turkish in origin, in an introduction to al-Azm's contribution:

...in fact of 'Ottoman' and Turkish descent. His family belonged to the Ottoman ruling class in Damascus; its power dates back to the 17th and 18th centuries... The Turkish family al-Azm continued to stay in Damascus [...] under French mandate. A member of the family, Khalid bey al-Azm, even became prime minister. The family's political influence lasted until 1963, when the pan-Arabic nationalist Baath party seized power.

In addition to the Turkish origin theory, an Arab origin is believed to be possible. In particular, the Azm family is believed to be part of "the Banu Azm tribe of the northern Hijaz, [who] served the Ottomans in the sixteenth century by protecting the Damascus-Medina caravan route, and later migrated to Anatolia, then to Ma'arra." In fact,

there is no doubt, however, that to eighteenth century local annalists and European observers the ‘Aẓms were known as a family of Arab (Bedouin) origin... It may very well be that the latter view [being of Turkish stock] is a mistaken conclusion based on the family's long residence in the province of Konya.

However, "there is no proof that the Azms themselves claimed to be of bedouin origin".

The controversy can be understood in light of statements made by Shimon Shamir and Abdul-Karim Rafeq. Shamir states that "although none of the views is supported by definite proofs, the latter [that is, the Beduin theory] seems to be more acceptable. In the realities of Syria in the seventeenth and eighteenth centuries, it is more likely that a Beduin family in the Ottoman service should become partly turkicized and live for a while in Anatolia than that a Turkish family should seek to derive prestige by falsely attributing its origins to a Beduin tribe." On the other hand, Abdul Karim Rafeq "opts for the local-origin theory without committing himself to the beduin part." In response to primary sources stating "that Sadeddin [Pasha al-Azm] was "un autre pacha arabe de nation"; and that Mehmed [Pasha al-Azm] was of an Arab family... [and] that the 'Azms were "Arabs" (awlad al-'Arab) from the Arab lands (al-bilad al-'Arabiyya)," Rafeq advocates for treating these statements with great caution, especially the epithet "Arab", which he takes to mean "local" as opposed to Ottoman. There is evidence that "Sulayman Pasha al-Azm knew not a word of Arabic whereas Mehmed was apparently thoroughly Arabized".

== Rise to power ==
Ismail Pasha, who later became wāli (governor) of Tripoli, was transferred to Damascus in 1725 at the request of the mufti, after fighting between different factions of janissaries prevented the Hajj caravan from departing on time. His brother became the wali of Tripoli, and his son became the wali of Sidon. In 1730 when Sultan Ahmed III was deposed they were all dismissed, but not for long. Sulayman Pasha al-Azm, brother of Ismail Pasha, became wali of Damascus between 1733 and 1738 and again from 1741 until his death in 1743. He was succeeded by his nephew As'ad Pasha al-Azm who reigned between 1743 and 1757, and was considered the greatest governor of Damascus in Ottoman times. As'ad Pasha overcame all his local adversaries after three years struggle. In his reign Hama and Homs were added to the province of Damascus.

Despite As'ad Pasha's ability to ensure the security of the pilgrim caravan, the new Ottoman authorities in Istanbul deposed him in 1757 after fourteen years of governance. The Grand Vizier at the time, Raghib Pasha, denounced him as a, "peasant son of a peasant," after a deal between the two of them failed. In addition, it was said that the Kizlar Agha of Istanbul disliked al-Azm for apparently not taking good care of him when he passed through Damascus on the pilgrim caravan. The Ottoman state was also interested in confiscating the wealth al-Azm accumulated during his tenure in office. The large amounts of money collected made the state revalue its currency. He was transferred to Aleppo and later dismissed and executed. There is a tomb in Ankara for İsmail Paşazade Hacı Esad or literally Haji As'ad son of Ismail Pasha known in Turkish as the Azimi Türbesi which is his likely resting place given the matching names - his and his father's - and the inscription on the tombstone which states that he was the Haj Emir for 14 years. The year of his death on the tombstone reads 1171 of the Hijri year, corresponding to 1757 in the Gregorian calendar. According to the Encyclopedia of Islam of the Turkey Religious Foundation, he was appointed governor of Aleppo on January 21, 1757. On September 25, 1757, he was appointed governor of Sivas and exiled to Ruse, Bulgaria in the same year. According to this account, As'ad Pasha's exile, first to Sivas and then to Ruse, appears to be related to the Bedouin attack in September 1757, which resulted in the deaths of 20,000 pilgrims, including the sultan's sister. As'ad Pasha, who had arrived in Ankara en route to Ruse, was executed there. Others such as the Kizlar Agha of the time -who was in charge of the Haj pilgrimage-were also executed. According to this account, As'ad Pasha's head was taken to Istanbul and buried in the Tunusbağı cemetery in Üsküdar. This marked the end of the family's golden age. It continued to assert some influence, and many of its members served as walis later, but its great days were over. The last member of the family to govern Damascus was Abdullah Pasha al-Azm who served intermittently between 1795 and 1807. Nonetheless, the Azm family continued to be influential, producing the first prime minister of modern day Syria, Haqqi al-Azm and later Khalid al-Azm.

=== Maintaining the family name ===
In the mid-18th century the al-Azm family reconciled itself to power centres outside the family. Consequently, two members of its family, Layla bint al-Sayyid Ibrahim al-Azm and Khadija bint Nasuh Pasha, were married to Turkish mamluks in the family's service to retain the Azm family name. The lineage descending from Layla indicates that this branch of the family were concentrated around Hama, and many held government posts there.

== Legacy ==
Al-Azm's era brought a building boom to Damascus where dozens of baths, khans, schools and souqs were built, many of which still remain today. Most famous of them are the Azm Palace in Damascus, and the Azm Palace in Hama, both of which were built by As'ad Pasha al-Azm as palatial residences.

== Different translation of surname ==
Last names were not used during the Ottoman era. Family members were using the name Azmzade in the nineteenth century during the Ottoman period, in reference to the Azm clan with the zade being an addition indicating Azm lineage. According to one theory, the word Azm derives from Kemik Huseyin (literally Bone Huseyin) who was originally from Konya. Azm in Arabic means bone. The Latin inscription of the name translated from Arabic script has evolved over time and is now written in different ways. Some family members have the family name Azme, Aladem, Alazm, Aladam, Alzm, El Azem or some other surnames, although they all belong to the same family. In addition, some members of the family that remained in Turkey have a variety of different last names which were selected following the promulgation of a 1934 law which made last names mandatory and banned the use of some names and titles including names that ended with zade. As a result, Azmzade could not be used by members of the family in Turkey as a last name. One member of the family took the surname Kemikoğlu, meaning "bone son" which is the literal Turkish translation of Azmzade.

== Members of the family ==
- Ismail Pasha al-Azm, Ottoman governor of Hama, Homs, Tripoli and Damascus
- Sulayman Pasha al-Azm, Ottoman governor of Tripoli, Sidon and Damascus, Ismail Pasha's brother
- As'ad Pasha al-Azm, Ottoman governor of Hama and Damascus, Ismail Pasha's son
- Sa'deddin Pasha al-Azm, Ottoman governor of Aleppo and Egypt (among others), Ismail Pasha's son
- Muhammad Pasha al-Azm, Ottoman governor of Sidon and Damascus, As'ad Pasha's son
- Abdullah Pasha al-Azm, Ottoman governor of Damascus, Muhammad Pasha's son
- Azmzade Sadik Al Mouayad, Ottoman governor of Jeddah, Imperial Commissaire in Bulgaria, Salih Azdashir Bey's son
- Haqqi al-Azm, former prime minister of Syria
- Rafiq al-Azm, editor and politician
- Khalid al-Azm, six-time former prime minister of Syria
- Sadiq Jalal al-Azm, Professor Emeritus of Modern European Philosophy at the University of Damascus

== Buildings named after the family ==
- Khan Sulayman Pasha
- Khan As'ad Pasha
- Al-Azm Palace in Damascus
- Azm Palace in Hama

== Books published by family members ==
- Azmzade Sadik El Mueyyed, Habes Seyahatnamesi [The Abyssinia Book of Travels], Istanbul, 1904, translated to English by G. Gokkent and family, 2021
- Azmzade Sadik El Mueyyed, Bir Osmanli Zabitinin Afrika Sahra-i Kebirinde Seyahati [An Ottoman Officer's Journey in the Grand Sahara of Africa], Istanbul, 1897 translated to English by G. Gokkent, 2021

== Bibliography ==
- Douwes, Dick (2000), The Ottomans in Syria: a history of justice and oppression, I.B. Tauris, ISBN 1-86064-031-1
- Stearns, Peter N.; Langer, Leonard (2001), Historical dictionary of Syria, Houghton Mifflin Harcourt, ISBN 978-0-395-65237-4
- Holt, Peter Malcolm; Lambton, Ann K. S.; Lewis, Bernard (1977), The Cambridge history of Islam, Volume 1, Cambridge University Press, ISBN 978-0-295-98676-0
- Singh, Nagendra Kr (2000), International encyclopaedia of Islamic dynasties, Anmol Publications PVT. LTD., ISBN 978-81-261-0403-1
- Choueri, Youssef M. (2005), A Companion to the History of the Middle East, Wiley-Blackwell, ISBN 978-1-4051-0681-8
- Dumper, Michael; Stanley, Bruce E. (2007), Cities of the Middle East and North Africa: a historical encyclopedia, ABC-CLIO, ISBN 978-1-57607-919-5
