= Köprülü Abdullah Pasha =

Ottoman general (1684–1735)

Köprülü Abdullah Pasha (Albanian: Abdulah pashë Kypriljoti; 1684 – 1735) was an Ottoman general of the first half of the 18th century and one of the commanders during the Ottoman-Hotaki War of 1722–27 as well as the Ottoman-Persian War of 1730–35.

== Biography ==
He was a member of the renowned Köprülü family, of Albanian origin, that had produced six Grand Viziers of the Ottoman Empire (four counting Kara Mustafa Pasha, who was an adopted son). After serving as nişancı circa 1702, Köprülü rose through the ranks of the Ottoman Army to the rank of General during the reign of Sultan Ahmed III. In 1716, he was the first appointment at the rank of Pasha (though not yet at that of a governor), to the hitherto small but fastly growing international trade town of İzmir.

From around 1703 to 1724, Köprülü was appointed to a series of provincial governorships, serving as the governor of the Sanjak of Chania (1702/03 – 1705/06, 1710–12), the Sanjak of Sakız (1705/06 – June 1707), the Sanjak of Sivas (June 1707 – 1709), the Trebizond Eyalet (1709–10), the Sanjak of Eğriboz (1710), the Mosul Eyalet (1712–15), the Aidin Eyalet (1715–16), the Sanjak of Jerusalem (1716), the Sanjak of Hamid (1716), the Damascus Eyalet (1717–18), the Diyarbekir Eyalet (1718 – January 1720), the Eyalet of Erzurum (January 1720 – August 1723), the Sanjak of Van (1723 – 1724/25), and the Van Eyalet (1724/25 – 1726/27).

While he was stationed in Van, Köprülü was the commander of the Ottoman forces during parts of the campaigns of the ongoing Ottoman-Hotaki War of 1722–27. In 1723, the Safavid Shah Tahmasp II of Iran made an agreement with the Russians, ceding major parts in the Caucasus and the Caspian littoral to the latter. Since this was against Ottoman interests in the region, an army under Köprülü was dispatched and had easily taken Nahçıvan, Merend, Ardabil, Tabriz, and Karabagh. Köprülü became the governor of the new (but short-lived) eyalet of Tabriz in 1724/25.

After the war, Köprülü resumed his series of provincial governorship appointments, serving as the governor of the Sidon Eyalet (1726/27 – August 1728), the Sanjak of Candia (August 1728 – July 1729; July 1731 – September 1732), the Egypt Eyalet (July 1729 – July 1731), the Sanjak of Bender (September 1732 – 1733), and the Sanjak of Konya (1733 – 1734/35).

Köprülü met the Persian general Nader (soon the Shah of Persia) in the Battle of Yeghevārd in 1735, part of the renewed Ottoman-Persian War of 1730–35. Ordering his forces to entrench in preparation for the advancing Persian army, he managed to avoid an open battle against Nader. However, recognizing a perceived weakness in the Persian lines, Köprülü launched a successful attack against the Persian forces. Despite initial success as well as a numerical superiority of five to one, Köprülü's army was defeated in a brilliantly planned counter-attack and Köprülü himself was killed in battle (near present-day Kars).

== Family ==
Abdullah was the son of Köprülü Fazıl Mustafa Pasha and grandson of Köprülü Mehmed Pasha. He married the daughter of Feyzullah, Zubeyda Hanım during turn of the year 1700–1701. In the course of their marriage 15 children were born, eight daughters and seven sons. Zubeyda Hanım died four years prior her husband, in 1731.

== See also ==
- Köprülü family
- List of Ottoman governors of Egypt

Political offices
| Preceded by Abdi Pasha | Ottoman Governor of Egypt; 1729–1731 | Succeeded by Silahdar Damat Mehmed Pasha |
