= Jazzar Pasha =

Ottoman governor

Ahmed Pasha al-Jazzar أحمد باشا الجزّار جزّار أحمد پاشا
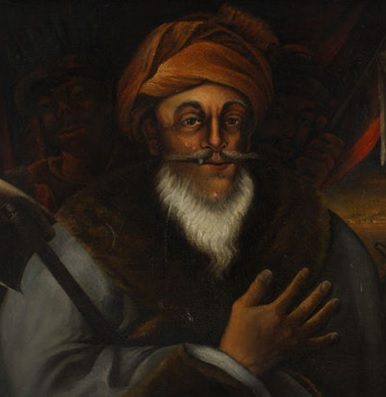
- 1775 portrait

Wali of Sidon
- In office May 1777 – April 1804
- Monarchs: Abdul Hamid I Selim III
- Preceded by: Daher al-Umar
- Succeeded by: Sulayman Pasha al-Adil

Wali of Damascus
- In office March 1785 – 1786
- Monarch: Abdul Hamid I
- Preceded by: Husayn Pasha Battal
- In office October 1790 – 1795
- Monarch: Selim III
- Preceded by: Ibrahim Deli Pasha
- Succeeded by: Abdullah Pasha al-Azm
- In office 1798–1799
- Monarch: Selim III
- Preceded by: Abdullah Pasha al-Azm
- Succeeded by: Abdullah Pasha al-Azm
- In office 1803 – April 1804
- Monarch: Selim III
- Preceded by: Abdullah Pasha al-Azm
- Succeeded by: Ibrahim Pasha Qataraghasi

Personal details
- Born: c. 1720s – 1730s Fatnica, Bosnia Eyalet, Ottoman Empire
- Died: 7 May 1804 Acre, Sidon Eyalet, Ottoman Empire
- Resting place: Acre
- Military career
- Branch: Military of the Ottoman Empire
- Conflicts: French invasion of Egypt and Syria; • Siege of Acre

Ahmed Pasha al-Jazzar (Arabic: أحمد باشا الجزّار, c. 1720–30s – 7 May 1804) was the Acre-based Ottoman governor of Sidon Eyalet from 1776 until his death in 1804 and the simultaneous governor of Damascus Eyalet in 1785–1786, 1790–1795, 1798–1799, and 1803–1804. Having left his native Bosnia as a youth, he began a military career in Egypt in the service of mamluk officials, eventually becoming a chief enforcer for Ali Bey al-Kabir, Egypt's strongman ruler. Al-Jazzar fell out with Ali Bey in 1768 after refusing to take part in the assassination of another of his former masters. He fled to Syria, where he was tasked by the Ottomans with defending Beirut from a joint assault by the Russian Navy and Daher al-Umar, the Acre-based ruler of northern Palestine. He eventually surrendered and entered Daher's service before defecting from him.

After the Ottomans eliminated Daher, they appointed al-Jazzar as their garrison commander in Acre. He pacified the Galilee and Mount Lebanon, which had been dominated by Daher's kinsmen and the Druze forces of Yusuf Shihab, respectively. In 1776, he was appointed governor of Sidon with his capital at Acre, which he strongly fortified. In the following years, he defeated his erstwhile Shia Muslim ally, Nasif al-Nassar, consolidating his control over Jabal Amil (southern Lebanon). In 1785, al-Jazzar was appointed to his first of four terms as governor of Damascus, each time gaining more influence in the province's affairs in opposition to his rivals from the Azm family. In 1799, with the help of the British navy, al-Jazzar defended Acre from Napoleon, forcing the latter to withdraw from Palestine in disarray. His successful defense of Acre earned him prestige in the empire and made him well known in Europe.

Al-Jazzar died in office in 1804. He was ultimately succeeded in Acre by his mamluk Sulayman Pasha al-Adil; until his suppression of a mamluk revolt in 1789, al-Jazzar had appointed mamluks to senior posts in his military and administration. Al-Jazzar attempted to develop the areas under his control by improving road security and maintaining order. However, his domestic military expeditions and stringently enforced and exploitative taxation policies precipitated high emigration, although the cities of Acre and Beirut prospered. The former became a powerful regional center rivaling Damascus and until today contains many architectural works commissioned by al-Jazzar, such as its walls, the el-Jazzar Mosque and the Khan al-Umdan caravanserai.

== Early life and career ==
=== Origins ===
Al-Jazzar (possibly born 'Ahmed Pervan') was a Bosniak. (Note: Al-Jazzar's ethnic identity was well known among the servants and contemporaries of his time. Abd al-Rahman al-Jabarti after his passing notes that Al-Jazzar "came from the land of Bosniaks" and that he was originally from Bosnia. Edward Daniel Clarke, in his Travels in various Countries of Europe, Asia and Africa mentions "His real name was Achmed, he was a native of Bosnia, and speaks the Sclavonian language better than any other" Western sources also mention his ethnic identity, thus, the British naval colonel Squire, in his conversations with Jazzar Pasha records the following: The vizier (said he) has rich dresses and precious ornaments in abundance; but he carries all his wealth on his person. I am a Bosniac, a rough, unpolished soldier, not accustomed to courts and politeness, but bred in camps and in the field — Extract from Colonel Squire's MS. Journal; giving an account of Caiffa, Acre, etc. and of his interviews with Djezzar Pashau: E.D. Clarke, Travels in Various Counties of Europe, Asia and Africa. Page 252. French writer Edouard Lockroy mentions his geographical and ethnic origin many times. Often stating that he was a Bosniak, from Bosnia.) He was born to a poor family in the Sanjak of Herzegovina. Native writers from Bosnia and Herzegovina hold that he was born in Fatnica to the Bosniak Pervan family, and thus claim that Ahmed Pervan was his birth name. Kosta Hörmann, founder and first editor of the Gazette of the National Museum of Bosnia and Herzegovina, in his study of folk tales of the Bosniaks of Herzegovina, noted that the "old folk" of Stolac claimed that Ahmed was a Pervan from Fatnica. Hörmann noted that Ahmed likely never disclosed information about his family himself One source lists the year of his birth as 1720, but Philipp believes it is more likely that he was born in the 1730s.

At the age of 20, or in his late adolescent years, around 1755, he moved to Constantinople. In al-Jazzar's biography by Volney in Voyage, al-Jazzar fled Bosnia at the age of 16 because he raped his sister-in-law, while in Olivier's account, al-Jazzar fled at age 17 after stabbing a woman who did not accede to his desires. According to Olivier, he then began work as a sailor and drifted throughout Anatolia before selling himself to a Turkish slave trader. Al-Jazzar subsequently converted to Islam in Egypt.

=== Service with the Mamluks of Egypt ===
In 1756, al-Jazzar departed Constantinople for Egypt with Hekimoğlu Ali Pasha as a barber in his entourage. Hekimoğlu Ali Pasha had been appointed beylerbey (governor) of Egypt Eyalet and al-Jazzar became a member of his household, serving Hekimoğlu Ali Pasha in the citadel. In 1758, possibly as a result of a dispute with another of Hekimoğlu Ali Pasha's men or upon his own intuition, he accompanied Salih Bey al-Qasimi, a Mamluk and the amir al-hajj (commander of the Hajj caravan) to Mecca. There, the two men developed a close friendship, and al-Jazzar subsequently entered into Salih Bey's service. After returning to Cairo, al-Jazzar, entered the service of the Mamluk Abdullah Bey, who was a retainer of another Mamluk, Ali Bey al-Kabir, the shaykh al-balad, a powerful post in Egypt with unclear duties, between 1760 and 1766.

During his time in Abdullah Bey's service, al-Jazzar learned how to speak Arabic, learned the skills and knowledge of the Mamluks and adopted their dress. When Abdullah Bey was later killed in an attack by Bedouin tribesmen, al-Jazzar decided to avenge his death. He proceeded to set a trap for the Bedouin and ambushed them, killing around 70 tribesmen. Thereafter, he became known as "al-Jazzar", which means "the Butcher" in Arabic. While later European writers believed al-Jazzar gained his name because of his cruel nature, the name was given to him as a sign of respect. The term "al-Jazzar" as an epithet was typically reserved for those who slaughtered Bedouin raiders.

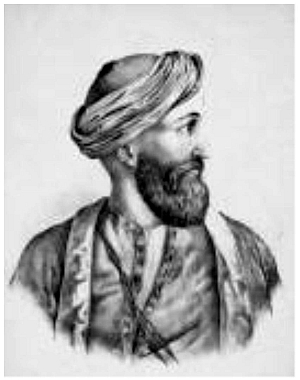
Al-Jazzar was a chief assassin and protégé of the Mamluk strongman of Egypt, Ali Bey al-Kabir (pictured)

Al-Jazzar arrived in Egypt as a freeman and was not a mamluk (manumitted slave soldier) in the traditional sense. However, the respect and admiration he gained from the Mamluks of Egypt for his loyalty to his Mamluk master and the revenge he took on the Bedouin for his death earned him a welcome into the Mamluk ranks. Among those impressed with the loyalty and courage of al-Jazzar was Ali Bey al-Kabir, who adopted al-Jazzar as his protégé. Ali Bey appointed al-Jazzar sanjak-bey (district governor) of Cairo, and he became known as "Ahmad Bey al-Jazzar". Al-Jazzar was tasked with enforcing law and order in the province, but was also assigned to discreetly eliminate Ali Bey's enemies. He shared this task with Abu al-Dhahab at times.

In September 1768, Ali Bey instructed al-Jazzar and Abu al-Dahab to assassinate Salih Bey because Ali Bey perceived him as a threat to his power. Al-Jazzar was wary of killing his old friend and master, and proceeded to warn Salih Bey of Ali Bey's plot. Salih Bey did not believe that Ali Bey, a close friend and ally, would have him killed and dismissed al-Jazzar's warning, going so far as to approach Ali Bey himself and report the matter. Ali Bey denied the plot and informed Salih Bey that he was only testing the loyalty of al-Jazzar. Salih Bey was indeed ambushed and killed by Ali Bey's men. Al-Jazzar was present among the hitmen, but did not participate in the actual assassination. Abu al-Dahab, who was also present, reported al-Jazzar's lack of enthusiasm in the operation to Ali Bey.

Fearing for his life in light of his betrayal of Ali Bey, al-Jazzar fled Cairo dressed as a Maghrebi. Before leaving his home, he instructed his family to tell anyone who inquired about him that he was ill and could not see visitors. Ali Bey's men sought to arrest al-Jazzar and learned of his escape to the port of Alexandria and pursued him. However, al-Jazzar managed to board a ship heading to Constantinople hours before the arrival of Ali Bey's men to the port.

=== Early career in Syria ===
Information about al-Jazzar between 1768 and 1770 is unclear; according to historian Thomas Philipp, he "may have drifted through Anatolia to Aleppo". According to the chronicler al-Jabarti, al-Jazzar returned to Egypt and allied himself with a Bedouin tribe to confront Ali Bey, but fled the province for a second time. However, by 1770 it was clear that al-Jazzar was in Deir al-Qamar, a Druze village in Mount Lebanon. He was impoverished there to the point that he was forced to sell his clothes in order buy food. He was then taken into the care of Yusuf Shihab, the emir of Mount Lebanon and leader of the region's Druze clans, who took an interest in al-Jazzar. For an undefined period of time, al-Jazzar remained in Mount Lebanon before searching for employment in the coastal cities. He did not have success finding work and left for Damascus, where he was also unable to gain employment. For a third time, al-Jazzar traveled to Egypt, this time to retrieve money and other valuables from his home in Azbakiya. To avoid detection by the authorities, he dressed as an Armenian. His trip to Egypt was short and he subsequently returned to Syria.

In 1772, the Ottoman commander-in-chief of the Syrian provinces, Uthman Pasha al-Wakil, and Emir Yusuf besieged Sidon to oust the forces of Sheikh Daher al-Umar, the Arab strongman of northern Palestine, and Nasif al-Nassar, a powerful Shia Muslim sheikh in Jabal Amil. Daher consequently requested the Russian fleet bombard Beirut, which was under Emir Yusuf's control, to distract the Ottoman forces. The siege was lifted in June prior to the Russians' arrival in Beirut. On 18 June, the Russians began to bombard Beirut, but Emir Yusuf paid them to end their assault on 28 June. Fearing that Daher would occupy Beirut, Emir Yusuf requested al-Wakil bolster Beirut's defenses. In response, al-Wakil dispatched al-Jazzar with a force of Maghrebi soldiers and appointed him muhafiz (garrison commander) of Beirut. Al-Jazzar upgraded Beirut's fortifications. According to Philipp, "Beirut became the first stepping stone of Ahmad Pasha al-Jazzar's career in Syria".

Meanwhile, in a sign that enmity for al-Jazzar by the Mamluks of Egypt was still strong, Abu al-Dhahab offered 200,000 Spanish reals to Emir Yusuf to kill al-Jazzar in 1772. Emir Yusuf refused the offer. However, instead of defending Emir Yusuf's authority, al-Jazzar used Beirut as his own power base, justifying his presence as being in defense of the Ottoman Empire. Emir Yusuf demanded al-Jazzar withdraw from Beirut, but the latter refused, prompting Emir Yusuf to appeal to al-Wakil. The latter did not accept Emir Yusuf's request for assistance. Al-Wakil viewed al-Jazzar as a reliable representative whose control of Beirut would prevent another important Syrian port city from falling to Daher and provide a launch point for an offensive against Daher.

Emir Yusuf rallied his Druze forces to dislodge al-Jazzar, but the latter was able, through bribes, to manipulate the deeply factional Druze clans against each other and stave off Emir Yusuf's attempts. Emir Yusuf then sought to form an alliance with Daher to oust al-Jazzar, gaining Emir Yusuf the enmity of al-Wakil. A punitive expedition sent by al-Wakil targeting Emir Yusuf in September 1773 was repelled by Daher. Daher's success prompted Emir Yusuf to seek the assistance of the Russian fleet by appealing to Daher, the Russians' ally, to intercede with the Russians on Emir Yusuf's behalf. The Russians agreed to the request and began bombarding Beirut on 2 August. Al-Jazzar initially refused to surrender despite the heavy naval bombardment. However, after the Russians managed to land artillery pieces near Beirut and cut the city off by land, al-Jazzar decided to surrender to Daher, four months after the siege. Fearing that Emir Yusuf would kill him in custody, al-Jazzar only agreed to surrender if placed in Daher's custody because the latter promised to protect him and his Maghrebi garrison.

Escorted by an envoy of Daher, al-Jazzar subsequently headed for Daher's headquarters in Acre. Al-Jazzar entered into Daher's service, and the latter dispatched al-Jazzar and his men to help collect the miri (taxes designated for the annual Hajj caravan) from the area between Jaffa and Jerusalem. Al-Jazzar decided to defect from Daher's service by requesting employment by Ibrahim Pasha, the sanjak-bey of Jerusalem, but the latter refused al-Jazzar entry into the city due to suspicions that his request was a ploy by Daher to enter the city without resistance and conquer it. With the miri money that he stole, al-Jazzar departed for Damascus, where he was welcomed by al-Wakil. Al-Jazzar then left for Constantinople. There, he used his charisma to gain the favor of sultans Mustafa III (r. 1757–1774) and Abdul Hamid I (r. 1774–1789). He was subsequently appointed sanjak-bey of Afyon Sanjak in western Anatolia.

== Ruler of Acre ==
=== Consolidation of power in Galilee ===
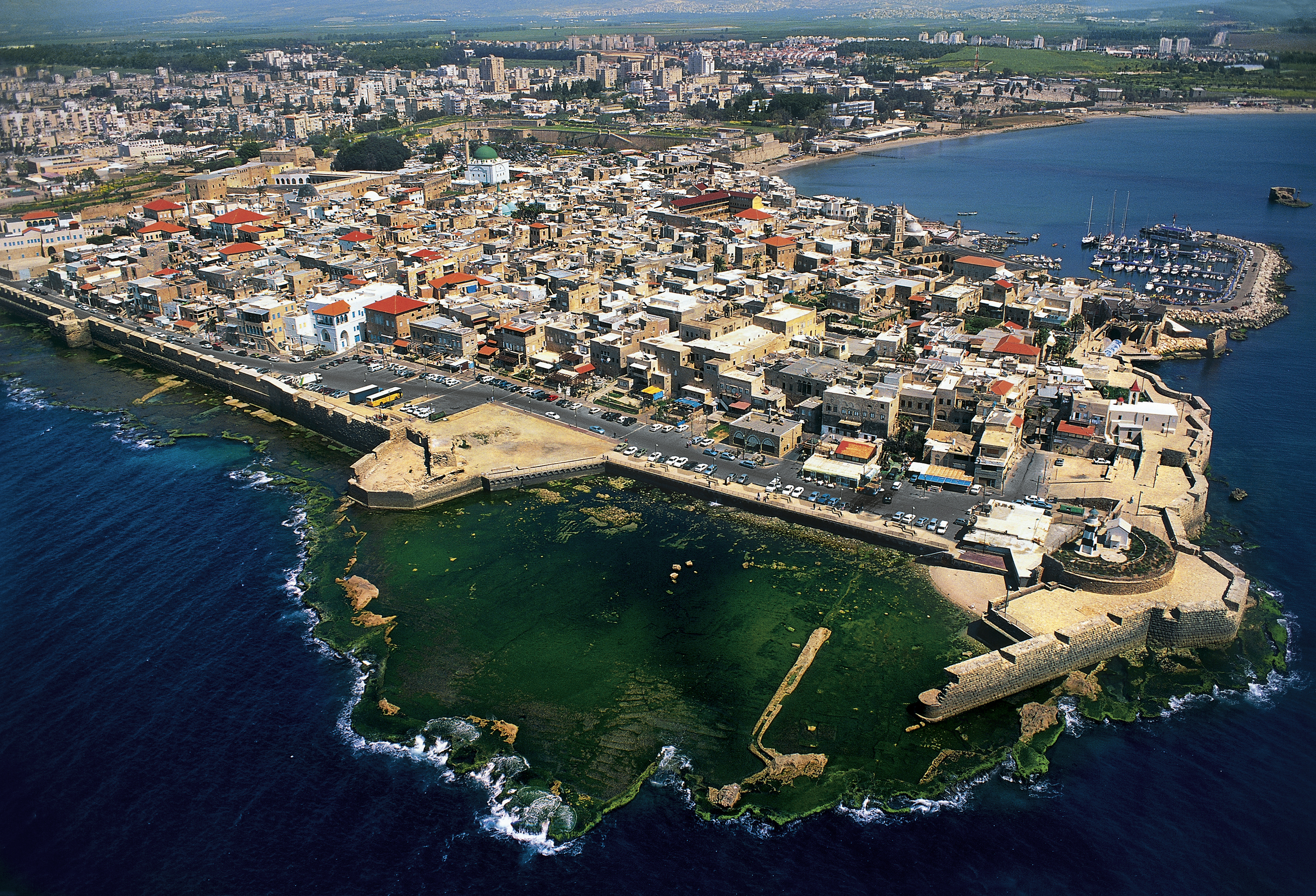
Skyline of Acre, where al-Jazzar established his headquarters

In August 1775, the Ottomans, having secured a truce with the Russians, redoubled their efforts to end Daher's autonomous rule. Daher was defeated and killed on 22 August. Later, in September, Sultan Abdul Hamid I appointed al-Jazzar muhafiz of Acre, and prior to his departure to Constantinople, Hasan Kapudan Pasha, the Ottoman admiral who led the campaign against Daher, handed control of Acre over to al-Jazzar. Al-Jazzar, using his influence in Constantinople, managed to secure promotion as the administrator of Sidon Eyalet with the rank of vezir (minister), but not wali (governor), in March 1776. He was also officially ranked as a pasha of three horsetails, the highest pasha rank, in the spring of 1776.

While the administrative capital of Sidon Eyalet was nominally Sidon, al-Jazzar made Acre his seat of power. Part of the reason that al-Jazzar chose Acre as his headquarters was that the city's citadel provided him a more strategic advantage over Sidon in the event of a potential dismissal by the Ottoman authorities from his post; the central Ottoman authorities replaced provincial governors relatively quickly, either out of fear that a prolonged reign would lead to a governor's rebellion or in pursuit of bribes that aspiring governors often paid to gain appointment. According to historian William Harris, "al-Jazzar aimed to make himself indispensable, while respecting Ottoman sovereignty." Al-Jazzar's move to Acre was meant to secure his rule and he proceeded to strengthen the city's fortifications and stock up on arms, artillery and ammunition.

Initially, al-Jazzar's power was effectively limited to Acre because Daher's Zaydani kinsmen still controlled their fortress villages in the Galilee and challenged the new order. Indeed, al-Jazzar's official justification for relocating the province's headquarters to Acre was to eliminate the remnants of Daher's realm still active in the city's hinterland. The most significant Zaydani opponent resisting al-Jazzar was Daher's son Ali, who was based in Deir Hanna. Meanwhile, Nasif al-Nassar submitted to al-Jazzar's authority. The Shia Muslim clans sought to make amends with the Ottoman authorities following their alliance with Daher and the principal Shia Muslim notable of Tyre hosted al-Jazzar during his visit to the city in the spring of 1776. Meanwhile, Hasan Kapudan returned to Acre in the summer of 1776, and he and al-Jazzar, whose forces were bolstered by Nasif's Shia horsemen, besieged Deir Hanna, which capitulated in June. With the defeat of Daher's sons, al-Jazzar consolidated his control over Acre and the Safad area.

=== Domination of Mount Lebanon ===
Al-Jazzar actively sought to dominate Mount Lebanon, which was controlled by the Druze clans. He seized Beirut from Emir Yusuf despite Emir Yusuf's authority over the city being confirmed by Hasan Kapudan. Moreover, al-Jazzar also demanded that Emir Yusuf pay the annual tax to Sidon, despite Emir Yusuf having already paid this tax via Hasan Kapudan. In August 1776, the forces of al-Jazzar and Emir Yusuf entered into armed confrontation. In the autumn of that year, al-Jazzar and Nasif, through mediation by the Shia sheikh of Tyre, Sheikh Qublan, finalized a tax payment arrangement. Thereafter, Nasif backed al-Jazzar in his conflict with the Druze clans, namely the Jumblatts, but also the various Shihab emirs, whose divisions al-Jazzar exploited in order to consolidate his authority in the mountainous hinterland of Sidon Eyalet. Al-Jazzar also utilized Nasif's cavalry to combat rebellious groups of Bedouins and Turkmens in the province.

Al-Jazzar continued to lobby for appointment as wali of Sidon Eyalet and was approaching open rebellion against the Ottomans in protest at not receiving the post. However, in May 1777, al-Jazzar was officially appointed wali. That year, al-Jazzar requested assistance against Emir Yusuf from Muhammad Pasha al-Azm, the wali of Damascus, and his son Yusuf Pasha al-Azm, the wali of Tripoli. Both refused, citing Emir Yusuf's loyalty and regular payment of taxes. They also feared al-Jazzar's growing power more than Emir Yusuf. Al-Jazzar dispatched the commander of his Maghrebi troops in Sidon, Mustafa ibn Qara Mulla, to collect payments from the Druze clans and kill Emir Yusuf. In his first foray into Mount Lebanon, the Druze forced him to retreat to Sidon. Mustafa was also unsuccessful in his second offensive, this time through the Beqaa Valley. In the latter offensive, the harvest of the valley was confiscated and the two sides entered into indecisive clashes.

However, conflict emerged between the Druze of Mount Lebanon, with the Jumblatt and Abu Nakad clans moving to depose Emir Yusuf and replace him with his brothers Sayyid-Ahmad and Afandi. The latter two offered al-Jazzar 50,000 qirsh in September 1778 for the tax farms of Mount Lebanon. Al-Jazzar accepted the offer. To support Sayyid-Ahmad and Afandi's appointment, al-Jazzar departed for Beirut with his troops and from there he besieged Emir Yusuf at Jubayl. Emir Yusuf was backed by his other brother, Emir Muhammad, and Yusuf Pasha of Tripoli.

Emir Yusuf was able to withstand the siege, which entered into a stalemate, but ultimately agreed to pay al-Jazzar 100,000 qirsh to restore him as emir of Mount Lebanon. Thereafter, al-Jazzar commissioned Nasif to launch an assault against Sayyid-Ahmad and Afandi to restore Mount Lebanon to Emir Yusuf. During the months after Emir Yusuf was restored, he proceeded to eliminate many of his relatives, who were potential rivals to the emirate, and felt secure enough to withhold tax payments to al-Jazzar. As a consequence, al-Jazzar launched a punitive expedition against the Druze, which succeeded in deposing Emir Yusuf, albeit temporarily. In 1780, Nasif backed al-Jazzar in a military confrontation with al-Jazzar's principal regional enemy at the time, Muhammad Pasha of Damascus. In May 1781, Nasif confronted Muhammad Pasha's forces in a second engagement on al-Jazzar's behalf.

=== Destruction of Shia autonomy ===
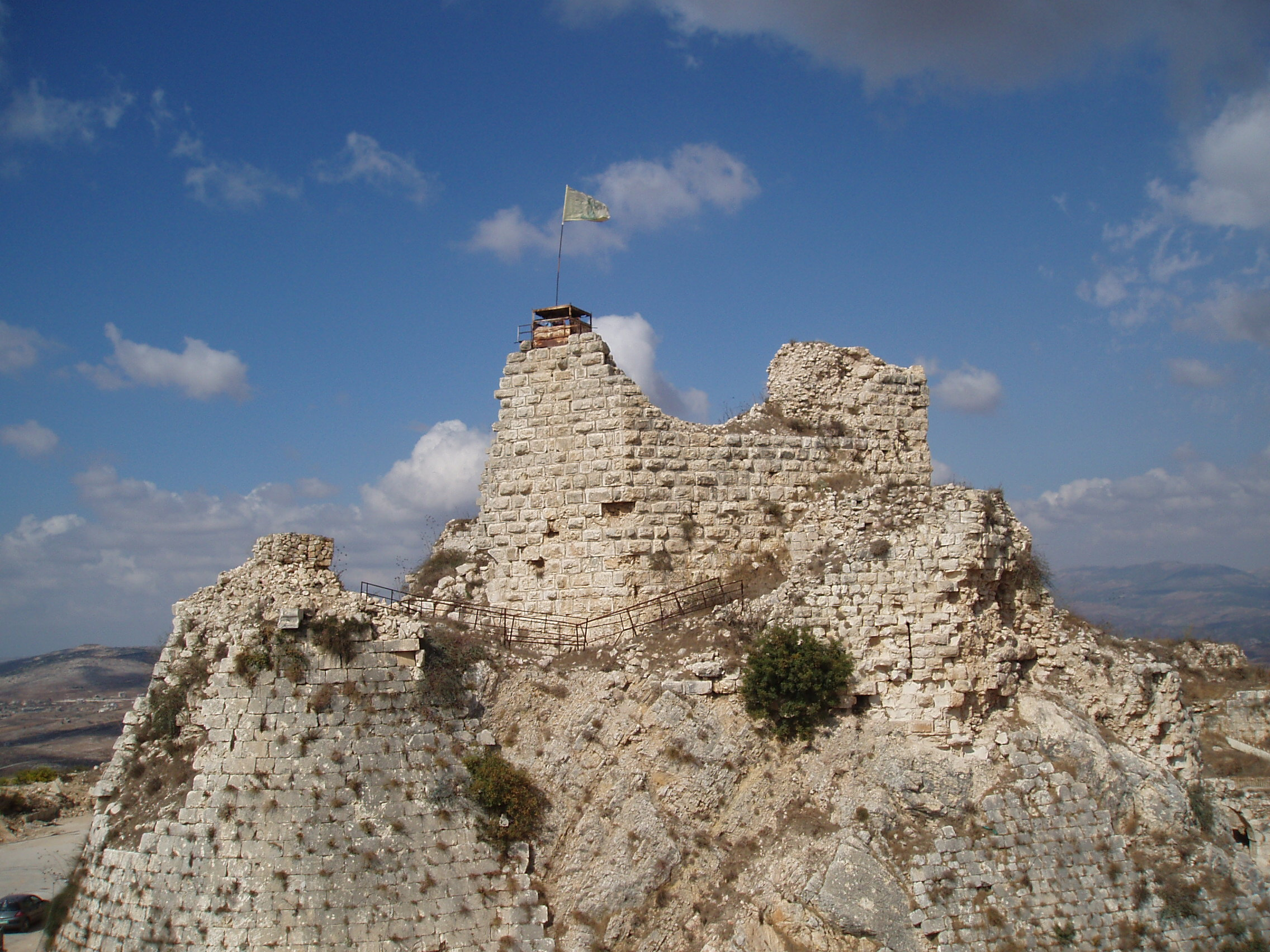
Remains of the Beaufort Castle that al-Jazzar had destroyed along with other fortress strongholds of the Shia Muslim clans in Jabal Amil

Al-Jazzar's relations with Nasif soured by September 1781, when, according to the local Shia chronicler Ali al-Subayti, the Shia sheikh of Hunin requested al-Jazzar's intervention against Nasif. Al-Jazzar dispatched one of his senior mamluk commanders, Salim Pasha al-Kabir, with 3,000 troops against Nasif and his Ali al-Saghir al-Wa'il clan. On 23–24 September, al-Jazzar's forces routed Nasif's forces, killing Nasif and 470 of his cavalrymen in a three-hour-long battle at Yaroun. Most of the leading Shia sheikhs of Jabal Amil were killed during a subsequent series of assaults against Shia-held fortress towns, the last being the Beaufort Castle (Shaqif Arnun), where the Shia clans made a last stand. Beaufort's inhabitants were not harmed following their surrender, and al-Jazzar coordinated their flight to the Beqaa Valley. This came to mark the virtual end of Shia autonomy in Jabal Amel.

The remainder of the leading Shia sheikhs took refuge with the Harfush clan in the Beqaa Valley. According to the French consul of Sidon and local Shia chronicler Haydar Rida al-Rukayni, following the defeat of the Shia sheikhs, Druze forces took the sheikhs' women and others as captives to al-Jazzar himself in Sidon, while Isma'il Shihab of Hasbaya proceeded to extort the survivors in return for protection. Massive amounts of valuables were seized from the Shia and their fortresses were largely demolished. In mid-October, Nasif's son 'Aqid launched a last-ditch effort against al-Jazzar's forces through the Beqaa Valley, but he ultimately fled during the battle. With this, Jabal Amil was conquered and the port city of Tyre became a permanent part of al-Jazzar's realm. The Sublime Porte (Ottoman imperial government) commended al-Jazzar's victory in a letter filled with rhapsodic praise and a promise to him of the empire's unyielding support to "clean the land of the filth of their existence", in reference to the Shia clans.

=== First term as Wali of Damascus ===
Al-Jazzar had long sought the governorship of Damascus to be added to his realm. Al-Jazzar's moves to gain the governorship in the wake of Muhammad Pasha al-Azm's death in 1783 were initially unsuccessful. The Sublime Porte was reticent to give al-Jazzar the added power of the governorship of Damascus, and instead the appointment went to a man who died 29 days into office and who was then replaced by Darwish Pasha al-Kurji. The latter was replaced after a year by Muhammad Pasha Battal. Both Darwish and Battal were deemed incompetent and the Sublime Porte ultimately appointed al-Jazzar to the governorship in March 1785, after the latter expended a large bribe to imperial officials in Constantinople. Al-Jazzar also managed to have one of his senior mamluks and treasurer, Salim Pasha al-Kabir, appointed wali of Sidon in his place, and another of his senior mamluks, Sulayman Pasha, appointed wali of Tripoli. Al-Jazzar departed for Damascus in mid-April with a ceremonial procession demonstrating his military might. This was the first and last time that al-Jazzar headquartered himself anywhere outside of Acre since becoming wali of Sidon in 1777.

Sometime in 1785, the Sublime Porte sought al-Jazzar's advice regarding how to address the increasing autonomy of Egypt's Mamluk rulers, namely Murad Bey. Al-Jazzar wrote that the Ottomans should launch an expedition against the Mamluks with 12,000 soldiers, reassert centralized rule there, appoint a governor with previous political experience in Egypt, and to regularly "present gifts to the soldiers ... in order to attract their support". The Ottomans launched an expedition led by Hasan Kapudan in 1786, but they were ordered to withdraw after the war with Russia resumed and the Mamluks were restored to power in Egypt.

With an army of some 5,000 soldiers, al-Jazzar made the dawrah (collection tour of the miri tax) in Palestine, which was largely part of Damascus Eyalet, in June and July 1785. The dawrah, which the inhabitants considered particularly brutal that year, coincided with spreading plague and famine in Palestine, and under these collective circumstances, many of Palestine's inhabitants left their villages. During the dawrah, al-Jazzar combated and defeated the local forces of Nablus, and asserted his authority in Hebron and Jerusalem, installing one of his mamluks, Qasim Bey, as the mutasallim (enforcer/tax collector) of the latter, replacing a local from the Nimr clan. The violence used by al-Jazzar during the dawrah was meant to stamp his authority in Palestine. The wali of Damascus was traditionally the amir al-hajj of the Syrian pilgrimage caravan, and after collecting the miri, al-Jazzar departed Damascus for Mecca in command of the Hajj caravan in October.

Al-Jazzar returned from the Hajj around January 1786. By mid-July, al-Jazzar was effectively the most powerful figure in Ottoman Syria, with the Damascus, Sidon and Tripoli eyalets under his direct rule or that of his lieutenants. Al-Jazzar attempted to establish a monopoly on the grain trade in Hauran by having grain shipped solely through Acre, bypassing Damascus and thus provoking the ire of that city's grain merchants. The Sublime Porte dismissed him later that year for unclear reasons. Al-Jazzar did not challenge the dismissal and returned to Acre to resume his duty as wali of Sidon.

=== Mamluk rebellion ===
On 4 May 1789, al-Jazzar dispatched two of his senior mamluk commanders and their troops to collect taxes from Emir Yusuf, which the latter had been reticent to pay. For this purpose, Salim Pasha al-Saghir was sent with 2,000 cavalry to Hasbaya, while Sulayman Pasha was sent with 800 infantry to the coast. According to French consul Jean-Pierre Renaudot, the relatively large size of mobilized troops sent for a relatively routine procedure such as collecting taxes was actually an attempt by al-Jazzar to avoid contributing his forces to the Ottoman war effort with Russia by demonstrating how his forces were still needed to combat the Druze of Mount Lebanon. On 8 May, al-Jazzar became aware of sexual relations between a number of his mamluks and women from his harem. He consequently cut off the arms of the mamluks who were headquartered in Acre's seraglio (where the harem was located) and had a number of women drowned at sea. On 9 May, al-Jazzar proceeded to purge his mamluks, arresting many, a number of whom were then executed, with the assistance of 30 Bosnian soldiers. The mamluks of Acre subsequently revolted and barricaded themselves in the treasury, which was located in Acre's Big Tower. Angered by the execution of his favored valet, the treasurer, a brother of Salim Pasha, then broke the incarcerated mamluks out of prison and linked up with the mamluk rebels at the Big Tower. The mamluks aimed the artillery pieces of the Big Tower at the seraglio and threatened to destroy it.

A stalemate ensued giving the mufti of Acre an opportunity to mediate between al-Jazzar and the mamluks. With the threat to his capital, al-Jazzar was compelled to agree to the safe departure of the 70–80 mamluk rebels from the city with their weapons and horses. The mamluks who remained in Acre, namely the pre-adolescents, were then either killed by al-Jazzar or exiled to Egypt. Meanwhile, the mamluks who were able to depart the city, led by the treasurer, moved north to the Lebanon and met with Sulayman Pasha and Salim Pasha. A reconciliation attempt between the mamluks and al-Jazzar failed and the mamluks, under the command of Sulayman and Salim, decided to topple al-Jazzar. They reached a truce with Emir Yusuf and secured the support of the Maghrebi unit commander in Beirut, al-Jaburi, who turned down al-Jazzar's orders to kill Salim. The mamluks used Sidon as their base of operations. However, the revolt met a challenge when the mamluks attempted to enter Tyre, but were refused by that city's commander. The mamluks proceeded to assault the town and plundered it after the mamluk commanders were unable to control them. News of the events in Tyre persuaded many in Acre who were wary of al-Jazzar's rule to prefer al-Jazzar instead of Salim.

After the sack of Tyre, the mamluks launched their offensive against Acre, where al-Jazzar was increasingly isolated from his troops. His remaining military forces in the city consisted of around 200 Albanian troops commanded by Juwaq Uthman. On 3 June, the rebels, numbering some 1,200 soldiers, including Kurdish cavalry from Hama commanded by Mulla Isma'il, reached the plain of Acre, but had no apparent plan on how to capture the city. In a last-ditch attempt to bolster Acre's defenses, al-Jazzar gathered and armed all of the city's government laborers and masons. The qadi of Acre, Shaykh Muhammad, advised al-Jazzar to mount a nighttime raid against the rebel's camp in the plain. Al-Jazzar heeded Shaykh Muhammad's advice, but also prepared a ship in Acre's harbor to escape in case of a rebel victory. At nightfall, Acre's defenders launched a sortie against the rebel camp, while the city's artillery bombarded the rebels. The assault took the rebels by surprise. Mulla Isma'il immediately withdrew during the assault, while the mamluks were defeated and fled during the five-hour battle. Sulayman and Salim escaped to Mount Lebanon, before heading to Damascus to renew their efforts to topple al-Jazzar.

The rebellion and its suppression effectively marked the end of the mamluk household al-Jazzar had raised, and the end of the mamluks as a military institution during al-Jazzar's rule. According to Philipp, the mamluk rebellion was al-Jazzar's "gravest military and political crisis", with the only exception perhaps being Napoleon's siege of Acre in 1799, although the rebellion "was in many ways more serious since it arose from an internal source." The revolt was perceived by al-Jazzar, himself a virtual product of the mamluk system, as a betrayal of his most senior lieutenants, whose careers and wealth he created through his patronage. The rebellion thus had traumatic effects on al-Jazzar's personality, which according to Philipp, transformed al-Jazzar's "latent fears, suspicions and distrust ... into a sense of paranoia". In the rebellion's aftermath, al-Jazzar launched a massive purge in his realm, executing and exiling people of all societal ranks. The 19th-century chronicler Haydar Ahmad Shihab noted that as a result of the rebellion, al-Jazzar "became like an untamed animal ... he imagined that the whole world was against him."

=== Second term as Wali of Damascus ===
In line with a pattern by the Sublime Porte to appoint al-Jazzar to Damascus in times of crisis, al-Jazzar was reappointed Wali of Damascus in October 1790, succeeding Ibrahim Deli Pasha. This came following a revolt by imperial Janissaries from the Citadel of Damascus led by Ahmad Agha al-Za'faranji and aghawat (local commanders) from the southern quarter of al-Midan against Ibrahim Deli, which the latter was able to suppress. However, unlike his first term, al-Jazzar chose to remain in Acre and appointed one of his close advisers, Muhammad Agha, as mutasallim or qaimaqam (deputy governor) of Damascus to administer the internal affairs of the province on his behalf. Through Muhammad Agha, al-Jazzar reestablished his monopoly on the grain trade of Damascus and Hauran, re-routing its export through Acre. Al-Jazzar still commanded the hajj caravan however, and officially remained the Wali of Sidon as well. This was in contrast to his first term as Wali of Damascus, where al-Jazzar officially relinquished Sidon Eyalet to his subordinate and subsequently struggled to persuade the Sublime Porte to restore him to the governorship of Sidon after being dismissed as Wali of Damascus in 1786.

Al-Jazzar's enmity with the Azm family, his chief rivals for power in Damascus, at times manifested into an alliance with the aghawat of al-Midan, who traditionally controlled the grain trade, against the aghawat of the northern city quarters who were traditionally allied with the Azms. The aghawat of al-Midan had likely joined the calls to dismiss al-Jazzar in 1786 due to the immediate financial harm they experienced with the establishment of the grain monopoly. However, during al-Jazzar's second term, a commercial interest of sorts was established between them, al-Jazzar and Jewish merchants from Acre and Damascus. They often served as al-Jazzar's mutasallims in various districts of Damascus Eyalet. The feud between al-Jazzar and the Azms intensified when Muhammad Agha had Ali Bey al-Azm, a son of Muhammad Pasha, killed by poison, on orders from al-Jazzar, and confiscated his properties.

Al-Jazzar appointed al-Za'faranji as mutasallim of Hama, a stronghold of the Azms, which had supported Ibrahim Deli against him in 1788. However, prior to his departure to command the hajj caravan in 1791, al-Jazzar had Muhammad Agha execute al-Za'faranji, likely out of fear that the latter, who was a popular commander and from the northern quarters, would conspire against al-Jazzar while he was away on the hajj. Dozens or hundreds of Damascenes, including numerous city notables, Muslim scholars and aghawat were executed during al-Jazzar's second term. These executions were overseen by Muhammad Agha, who was known to be "unusually oppressive", according to Philipp, and "extremely unpopular", according to historian Dick Douwes. Among the Muslim scholars who died in custody were three Hanafi muftis, who were targeted by al-Jazzar because of their association with the Azm family and their political clout in the city as the most senior indigenous religious officials; the most senior religious official was the qadi who was appointed by the Sublime Porte.

In 1794, al-Jazzar dismissed Muhammad Agha and replaced him with the trustee of the Sinaniyya Mosque of al-Midan, Ahmad Agha. The latter chose to target Jewish financial interests in Damascus in defiance of al-Jazzar, while he was leading the hajj caravan that year. Upon al-Jazzar's return, Ahmad Agha fled the city. Throughout his second term as Wali of Damascus, al-Jazzar continuously fought against the Jarrar and Nimr clans of Jabal Nablus, part of Damascus Eyalet, to assert his control over the virtually autonomous Nablus Sanjak. He established an alliance with the Tuqan family, appointing Musa Bey Tuqan as mutasallim of Nablus in 1794, a move which the Jarrars challenged. Al-Jazzar besieged them at their hilltop fortress at Sanur, but ended the siege in failure and with heavy casualties. Al-Jazzar was dismissed from the governorship of Damascus in 1795, marking his second term as his longest tenure as Wali of Damascus.

=== Defense of Acre and aftermath ===
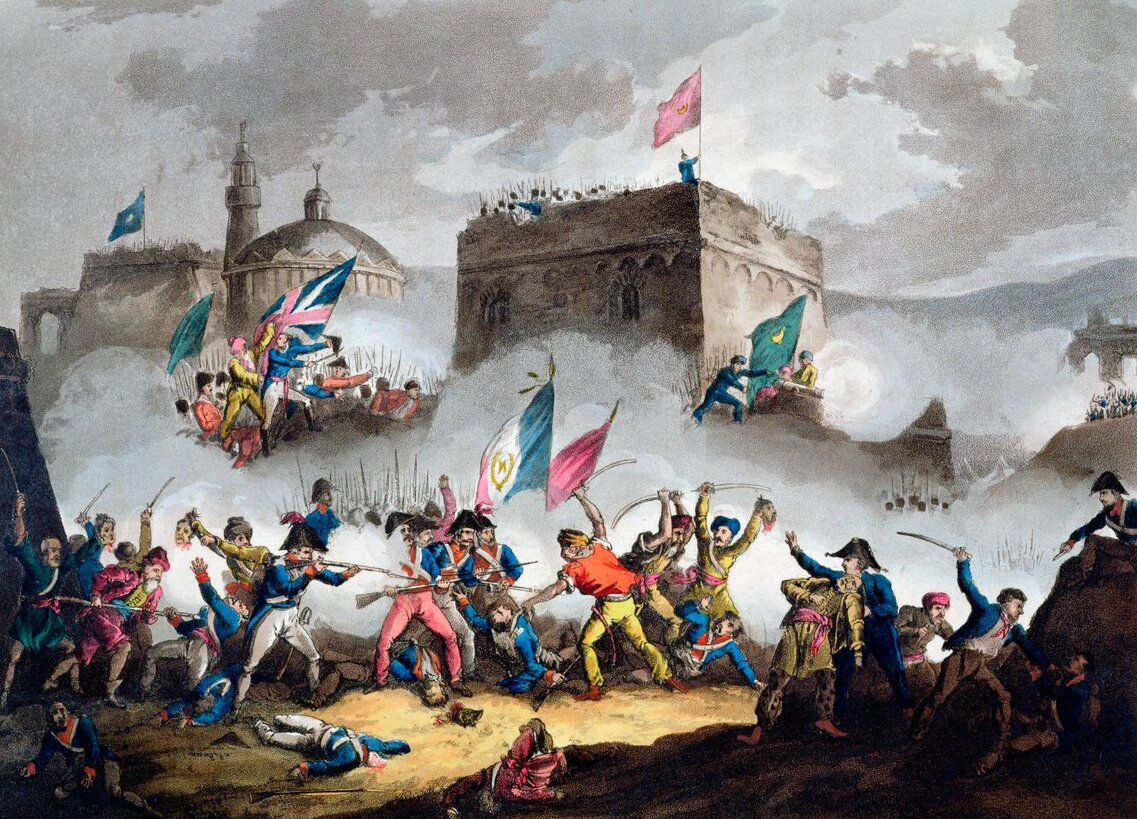
Artistic representation of the siege of Acre

In 1798 General Bonaparte conquered Egypt as part of his campaign against the Ottomans. The French invasion caused popular riots in Damascus, prompting the Ottomans to replace Abdullah Pasha as Wali of Damascus with Ibrahim Pasha al-Halabi, who became the target of an uprising. Al-Jazzar was ultimately appointed to a post akin to caretaker governor of Damascus and his troops subsequently restored order in the city. Upon al-Jazzar's visit to Damascus, he had numerous aghawat beheaded with their heads on display at the gate of the citadel.

Meanwhile, in February 1799, Bonaparte entered Palestine, first occupying Gaza and then moving north along the coastal plain, where eventually laid siege to Jaffa. Jaffa was defended by al-Jazzar's troops, but they surrendered during the siege in return for French promises that they would not be killed. However, in custody al-Jazzar's troops were not given food or shelter, and after several days French forces marched them, 3,000 or 4,000 in all, to the sand dunes of Jaffa's shore and executed them by bayonet over the course of several days. Simultaneous with the execution of al-Jazzar's troops, a plague afflicted Bonaparte's troops, resulting in numerous deaths.

Bonaparte's army then captured Haifa and used it as a staging ground for their siege of Acre. Al-Jazzar commanded his troops in Acre and personally scaled the town's walls and engaged in direct fighting with French soldiers. Prior to Bonaparte's arrival at Acre, al-Jazzar's forces had been bolstered by an advance brigade of 700 troops dispatched by the Sublime Porte. With access to the sea largely unfettered, he was able to secure supplies and reinforcements. Among the key reinforcements were some 800 British marines, who were led by Sidney Smith. The British Navy, specifically two men-of-war ships, also came to al-Jazzar's aid and bombarded Bonaparte's trenches through the course of the siege, resulting in heavy French casualties prior to the arrival of artillery batteries that the French used to shell Acre's fortress. After 62 days, Bonaparte withdrew his army with heavy loss of life on 20 May.

The Ottomans had been shocked by Bonaparte's invasion of Egypt, and were "spared further military embarrassment" by al-Jazzar's successful defense of Acre, according to historian Bruce Masters. His Muslim and Christian contemporaries both regarded his victory over the French Army as his greatest achievement. Al-Jazzar's victory significantly boosted his prestige. Mass celebrations in Damascus and Aleppo followed his victory, and al-Jazzar became "the defender of the faith" in Muslim public opinion, while being credited by European observers as among the few to have defeated Bonaparte.

Following Napoleon's withdrawal, al-Jazzar requested from the Sublime Porte to be appointed commander-in-chief of Egypt and lead the Ottoman reconquest of the province. Sultan Selim III's military advisers considered al-Jazzar's request, but ultimately decided that appointing al-Jazzar to Egypt would only empower him further and make him difficult to remove from the province. Instead, the Ottomans assembled an army under Grand Vizier, Kör Yusuf Ziya Pasha, to restore Ottoman control in Egypt. Yusuf Pasha restored Abdullah Pasha al-Azm to the governorship of Damascus in mid-1799, ending al-Jazzar's third and shortest (seven months) tenure in Damascus.

=== Final years ===
The Ottomans and the British defeated the French in Egypt in 1801, and during Yusuf Pasha's return to Istanbul through Palestine, Yusuf Pasha appointed his protégé and Hebron-area native Muhammad Abu Maraq to control Jaffa as the governor of the sanjaks of Gaza and Jerusalem. Giving Abu Maraq control of southern Palestine was intended to limit al-Jazzar's influence in that region. In defiance of the Sublime Porte, al-Jazzar sought to oust Abu Maraq and immediately besieged Jaffa, which al-Jazzar considered to be of immense strategic importance to his rule in Acre despite the city being in the jurisdiction of the Damascus Eyalet. Consequently, the Ottomans issued a firman condemning al-Jazzar as a rebel. Al-Jazzar dismissed the firman and continued his siege of Jaffa until Abu Maraq surrendered and fled the city in early 1803. Al-Jazzar subsequently mustered large funds and directed his lobby of influence in Constantinople and managed to have imperial support for his rule restored.

When Mecca was occupied by Wahhabi tribesmen in 1803 and humiliated the Hajj pilgrims under Abdullah Pasha's protection, the Ottomans dismissed Abdullah and reappointed al-Jazzar Wali of Damascus in late 1803. Abdullah Pasha did not accept his dismissal and mobilized troops from Hama to occupy Damascus, but his troops refused to fight because they were not paid their regular wage and because they did not want to challenge the Ottoman government. Al-Jazzar assigned Shaykh Taha al-Kurdi and his Kurdish units to oversee Damascus on his behalf. Al-Jazzar also launched another siege against the Jarrar sheikhs of Sanur, but was again unable to oust them.

=== Death and succession ===
Al-Jazzar was afflicted with a tertian fever in August 1803 and the illness he suffered kept him inactive. Al-Jazzar had Sulayman Pasha command the Hajj caravan of 1803–04 as amir al-hajj in his place. Al-Jazzar died on 7 May 1804. In 1816, James Silk Buckingham described al-Jazzar as the following:

He was a man famous for his personal strength, his ferocious courage, his cruelty, and his insatiable avarice, as well as for the great power which the active exertion of all these qualities together procured for him.

The Ottomans attempted to stop a potential power struggle from occurring in Acre when it became apparent that al-Jazzar was seriously ill, and in April 1804, they secretly appointed the Wali of Aleppo, Ibrahim Pasha Qataraghasi, as the wali of both the Sidon and Damascus eyalets, officially replacing al-Jazzar. After al-Jazzar's death, however, one of his imprisoned officers, Isma'il Pasha, was released by friendly soldiers. Isma'il assumed power in Acre in defiance of the Sublime Porte, which condemned him as a rebel in June. The Ottomans dispatched Qataraghasi to defeat Isma'il and assert his governorship of the Sidon and Damascus eyalets. Qataraghasi was backed by Sulayman Pasha on his way back from the Hajj, and the two men besieged Isma'il in Acre. Qataraghasi had to withdraw from the siege to begin the miri collection tour and prepare for the scheduled departure of the Hajj caravan in January 1805. This left Sulayman in command of the siege, during which Sulayman was appointed Wali of Sidon, which further motivated him to defeat Isma'il. The latter launched a sortie from Acre against Sulayman's troops near Shefa-'Amr and in the ensuing battle, Sulayman was victorious.

== Politics ==
=== Administration ===
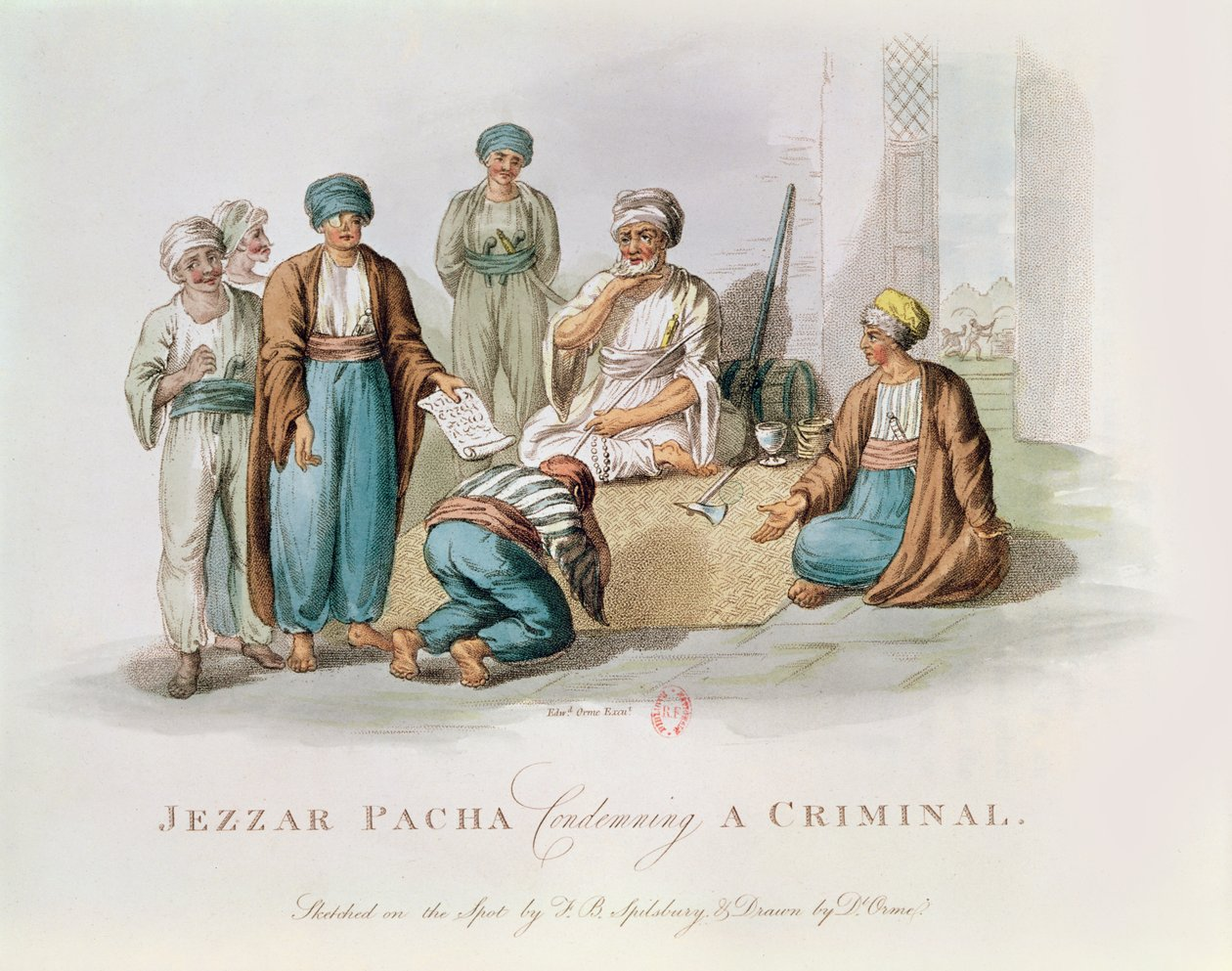
Al-Jazzar condemning a criminal in Acre, at his court in 1800

Al-Jazzar used his experiences and knowledge from his career with the Mamluks of Egypt to set up the mamluk system of military rule in Acre. Prior to the dissolution of his mamluk household in 1789, mamluks served as al-Jazzar's personal bodyguards and political advisers, as well as his subordinate administrators in the other cities and areas of his realm. The inner circle of his mamluk household was made up of Salim Pasha al-Kabir, Salim Pasha al-Saghir, Sulayman Pasha and Ali Agha Khazindar. They were either purchased or given to him during his time in Egypt, but it is not clear if they left Egypt with him in 1768 or if they moved to Acre after al-Jazzar was given the governorship of Sidon. Al-Jazzar had an emotional attachment to his mamluks and when his first mamluk, Salim Pasha al-Kabir, died in 1786 from the plague, al-Jazzar "cried like a child", according to the French consul in Acre. Despite the profound sense of betrayal he felt at the rebellion of his senior mamluks, when Sulayman Pasha returned to Acre in 1802, al-Jazzar "received him like a lost son", according to Philipp.

Towards the end of the 18th century, al-Jazzar employed Haim Farhi, a Damascene Jew from a banking family, to serve as his treasury manager and administrative adviser. At one point, al-Jazzar dismissed and arrested Farhi and had his eye gouged, and his ears and nose cut. Farhi was restored to his position and his role in Acre became increasingly influential under al-Jazzar's successors, Sulayman Pasha and Abdullah Pasha.

After establishing himself in Acre, al-Jazzar assigned a small of group of Kurds commanded by a certain Shaykh Taha, who was considered by the Muslims of al-Jazzar's realm to be a Yazidi and a devil worshiper, to administer internal security. In effect, they became responsible for running prisons and carrying out the torture and execution of individuals.

=== Military ===
Al-Jazzar's military forces were largely organized along ethnic lines, which helped guarantee loyalty and cooperation within each ethnic unit. The unit commanders were also typically from the same ethnic origin as the rest of the unit and were better placed to ensure a level of intra-unit discipline. The units consisted of Maghrebi infantry, Arnaut (Albanian) and Bushnak (Bosnian) cavalrymen from the Balkans who al-Jazzar purchased, and Kurdish Dalat cavalry units. The Maghrebi and Dalat units were mercenaries hired by al-Jazzar. The former previously formed a major part of Daher's army, while the latter were originally part of the Ottoman imperial army but became private militias in the service of various Ottoman Syrian governors throughout the 18th century.

Al-Jazzar also purchased individual mamluks, the majority of whom were of Georgian origin. The mamluks served as his most senior commanders in the field, but following the destruction of the mamluks during their 1789 rebellion, al-Jazzar increasingly relied on the commanders of the Dalat cavalry and other military entrepreneurs for hire from disbanded Ottoman imperial army units. An irregular force of Bedouin tribesmen or local levies known as "Hawwara" were employed by al-Jazzar at certain times as well, and their units became more frequently commissioned following the mamluks' demise. Although paying these various military units was a massive expense, al-Jazzar paid his troops well, at least during the early part of his rule as wali, in an effort to guarantee their loyalty and gratitude to him.

Al-Jazzar typically remained in Acre and dispatched his commanders and their units on campaigns. However, according to Philipp, "the truly great feats of the army occurred when al-Jazzar personally led his troops". Arab chroniclers from the 18th century often suggested that al-Jazzar raised new troops during each military campaign that he launched, although Philipp believes this to be unlikely, "but partially true, especially considering the high casualties of his troops in many lost battles". The number of soldiers in his permanent army versus those that were demobilized following a campaign is not clear, but a general consistent estimate from the chroniclers of the period suggests the total number of his permanent troops was between 7,000 and 8,000, while about 1,000 to 2,000 were typically dispatched at a time for most expeditions. However, these numbers by Arab chroniclers and French consuls were often based on guesses. At the approximate peak of his power in April 1785, a description by Renaudot of al-Jazzar's military procession from Acre to Damascus indicates the strength of his forces. The procession was described as consisting of 750 Maghrebi infantrymen, 200 Maghrebi cavalry, 540 Arnaut cavalry, and 300 Dalat cavalry, as well as 400 camels, 200 mules, some pulling artillery pieces, and several artillerymen. Each unit had a band and played its own music.

Al-Jazzar maintained a small naval force. In 1779, it consisted of two galiots and two zebecs. The vessels did not possess basic technical equipment and so al-Jazzar had such equipment, including compasses, stolen off French vessels. They were largely commissioned to thwart raids against the Syrian coast by Maltese buccaneers. By 1789, his naval squadron consisted of three galiots, one zebec and two Dalmatian boats that were based in Acre, but at times were briefly anchored at Tyre, Sidon, Beirut, Tripoli or Latakia. Al-Jazzar also owned three trading ships that routinely traveled between Acre and Damietta, a port city in Egypt.

=== Domestic policies ===
Al-Jazzar understood well that in order to maintain his political and military dominance in Syria, his rule needed a solid economic foundation. Al-Jazzar acquired his income from a variety of means, namely taxes, commerce, tolls and extortion. As such, he continued and strengthened the lucrative monopolies on cotton and grain that were established by Daher. In the 1780s, he expelled French cotton traders from Acre and Jaffa. Improvements in agricultural development and increased trade from Palestine bolstered the economic prosperity of certain enclaves of territory in his domain, particularly the coastal cities of Acre, Sidon and Beirut. He successfully suppressed marauding Bedouin tribes and thus increased security and maintained order in his territories. Although he attempted to attract immigrants, including Christians and Jews, to settle in his domains, al-Jazzar's institution and strict enforcement of a stringent and high taxation policy heavily burdened the population to the point that many emigrated from the areas he ruled to neighboring regions.

In a description of al-Jazzar's rule in Acre, Renaudot wrote that al-Jazzar was "violent, carried away by his temperament; though he is not inaccessible ... He is sometimes just, great, and generous, at other times furious and bloody." Commenting on his method of rule, al-Jazzar wrote

"In order to govern the people of this land, one cannot be too severe. But if I strike with one hand, I recompense with the other. This is how I maintained for thirty years, in spite of everybody, complete possession of all [the land] between the Orontes and the estuary of the Jordan".

Al-Jazzar maintained a significant level of popularity and familiarity with the inhabitants of Acre, and would often invite the town's poorer residents to hear their complaints and console them. According to Olivier, al-Jazzar would have "constantly enormous pots of rice in his palace for the destitute and the old" and had "money distributed to them every week with the greatest regularity". Al-Jazzar is reputed to have walked around with a mobile gallows in case anyone displeased him. French Orientalist Pierre Amédée Jaubert visited Acre in 1802 and wrote that al-Jazzar maintained a well-guarded prison whose doors he kept open so that residents could view the incarcerated prior to their torture or execution.

According to the contemporary chronicler Mikha'il Mishaqah, "even in the worst of his infamy, he maintained equal treatment of his subjects of different religions, for he would imprison Muslim ulema, Christian priests, Jewish rabbis and Druze elders alike." However, unlike during Daher's reign when Muslims and Christians lived harmoniously, al-Jazzar did not attempt to put a stop to incidents of harassment against Christians in Nazareth by Muslim peasants who entered the town during Friday prayers. Following the French occupation and withdrawal from Palestine in 1799, local Muslim anger was directed at local Christians, with the Catholics of Ramla in particular being killed, plundered and forced to flee. Al-Jazzar did not make an effort to end these attacks and instead took advantage of popular anger to order attacks against the Christians of Nazareth and Jerusalem. These directives were aborted by al-Jazzar following a warning by British admiral Sidney Smith.

In the early years of his rule, al-Jazzar maintained an amiable relationship with the Jews of Galilee. As part of rehabilitation of Safad, which had been destroyed by the Near East earthquakes of 1759, he called on Jews to help settle the city, offering rate reductions in taxes and customs duties. However, following the 1799 siege of Acre by Napoleon, relations between al-Jazzar and the Jewish community became marked by extortion on al-Jazzar's part to make up for financial losses incurred during the war.

== Sources ==
Volney was al-Jazzar's first European biographer and visited al-Jazzar's capital of Acre in 1783. According to historian Thomas Philipp, Volney "decided to use Ahmad Pasha al-Jazzar as the archetype of the despotic tyrant. Since then, no literary vilification of al-Jazzar could be bad enough. Increasingly he was depicted as a murderous, paranoid, treacherous, and cruel despot." Among the European contemporary sources who wrote about al-Jazzar after Volney were Baron de Tott who visited Acre in 1784, the French vice consul in Acre Jean-Pierre Renaudot, the French traveler Olivier who met al-Jazzar in 1802, and A.J. Dénain. European contemporaries of al-Jazzar often considered him the symbol of despotism and monstrosity, but also acknowledged the complexities and paradoxes of his personality. According to Philipp, it was only the descriptions of al-Jazzar by later authors, namely Mikhail Mishaqah and Édouard Lockroy, that were "reduced entirely to the monstrous and sensational".

"They say al-Jazzar is cruel and barbaric; he is only just." — Jazzar Pasha, in response to European perceptions of him.

Philipp asserts that "al-Jazzar must have been a highly unpleasant ruler and probably did suffer towards the end of his life from paranoia, but there were also different sides to his personality". Accordingly, Philipp indicates that al-Jazzar's biography by Abd al-Rahman al-Jabarti, an 18th-century contemporary Arabic chronicler, "provides ... a much more sober account of al-Jazzar's life", which is largely corroborated by another Arabic contemporary source, Ahmad Haydar al-Shihab. Both al-Jabarti, who was based in Cairo, and al-Shihab, who was based in Mount Lebanon, had considerable access to information about al-Jazzar and though their accounts are similar, they did not correspond with each other or share sources. The early 19th-century English writer E. D. Clarke commented that European stories of al-Jazzar "are easily propagated, and as readily believed and it is probable that many of them are without foundation." Nonetheless, Philipp states "the testimony is too general and too consistent to dismiss all accusations against him [al-Jazzar]".

== Personal life and characteristics ==
In his sixties, al-Jazzar was described as having a white beard and being agile and of muscular build. His native tongue was Bosnian, but he spoke Ottoman Turkish and Arabic with a distinctively Egyptian accent. Although he had previously been a frequent drinker, he quit consuming alcohol following his participation in the Hajj of 1791. Towards the end of his life, he maintained a seemingly austere lifestyle and refrained from extravagant spending, with the exception of his bribery of imperial officials and his building works in Acre. He would typically either don a standard Arab dress or a coarse cloth and turban. He would often meet guests sitting beneath a date palm or on a cushion-less board. He was an avid gardener and later took up paper artwork as a hobby with which he entertained his guests and his harem.

Philipp asserts that "there can be no doubt that there was a streak of cruelty and perhaps of sadism" and an "uncontrollable temper" in al-Jazzar, but that "cruelty was only one of his character traits." In addition to his brutality, his French contemporaries wrote that al-Jazzar was intelligent, talented, cunning, generous and boastful of these attributes and of his courage and physical stamina. He also possessed considerable engineering ability, although it is not known how he gained that knowledge.

== Legacy ==
Al-Jazzar created a level of domestic security and economic prosperity in the land he ruled for nearly 30 years, mostly with the support of the Sublime Porte and occasionally in defiance. However, the socio-economic development and dynamism that occurred during his rule was reversed in later decades. Unlike his predecessor Daher, al-Jazzar was a foreign ruler and a representative of the Ottoman state. Nonetheless, he pursued his own ambitions of autonomous rule from Acre, which was continued by his successors Sulayman Pasha and Abdullah Pasha (a son of one of al-Jazzar's senior mamluks).

Although there are numerous biographical works and poems about al-Jazzar by his contemporaries and in the immediate decades after his death, little has been written about him in the modern era. In Palestinian historiography the native-born Daher has been embraced, al-Jazzar, with his negative reputation, has been ignored. Neither has al-Jazzar been adopted by Bosnian nationalists, likely due to his distance from Bosnian history; whereas the Israeli establishment (Acre's current sovereign) idolize his Jewish advisor Haim Farhi in monuments and books on the period. According to Philipp, the issue of al-Jazzar's integration into national historiography is part of a broader issue of the historiographic integration of the Ottoman-era Mamluks, especially the Mamluk rulers of Egypt, who in the modern era were deemed as elite foreigners that dominated the local population and only in recent years have been discussed in detail by local historians.

=== Building works ===
==== El-Jazzar Mosque ====
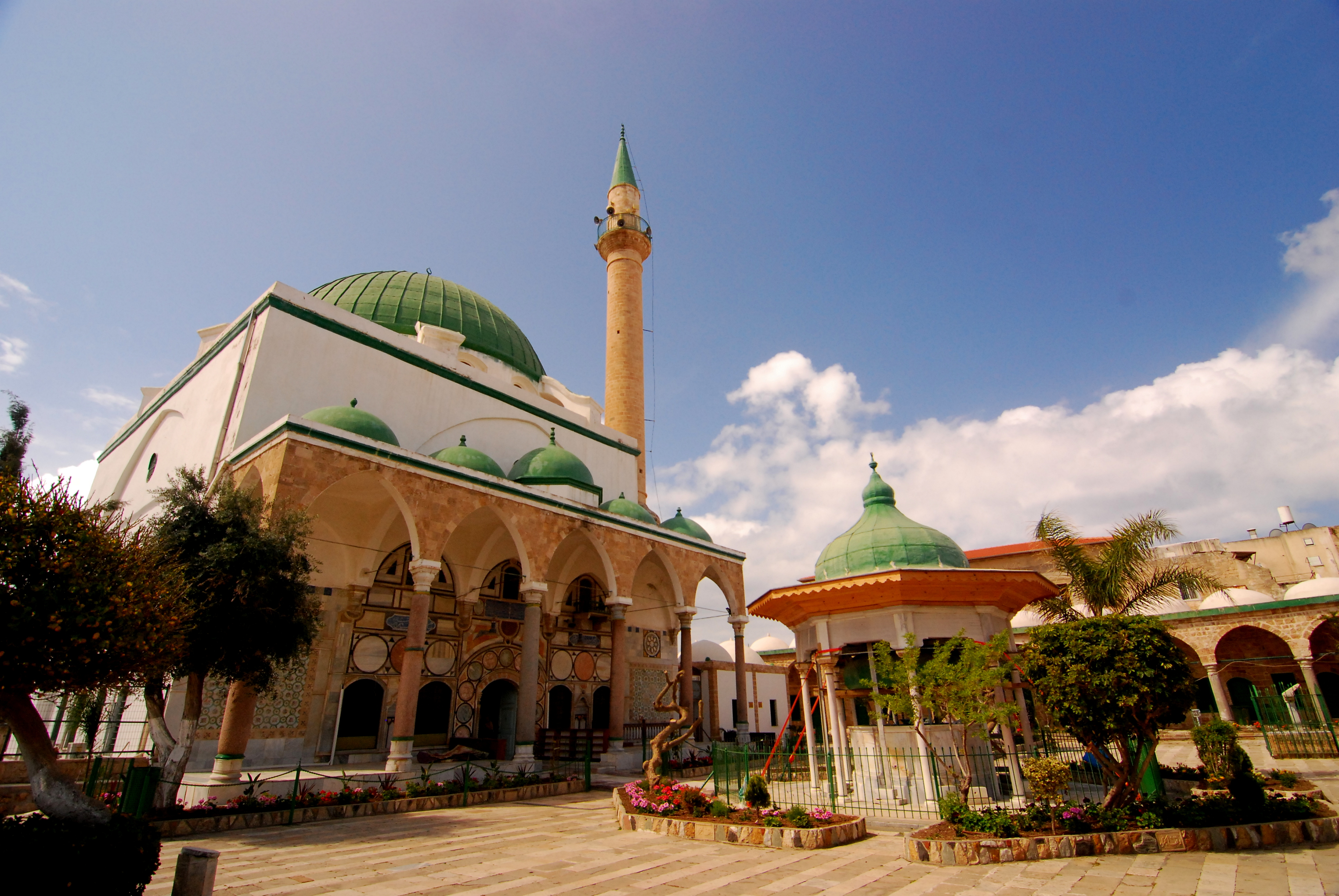
El-Jazzar Mosque, built by al-Jazzar in 1778

When al-Jazzar established himself in Acre in 1775, the city contained four mosques, three of which were built during Daher's reign and one prior. Three years later, al-Jazzar had a fifth mosque built, known then as the "White Mosque" or the "Friday Mosque", but known today as the el-Jazzar Mosque. According to Philipp, it was the "largest and most beautiful" of Acre's mosques. Although al-Jazzar had no architectural background, he was the architect of the mosque and supervised the entire complex's construction.

The mosque was modeled on the mosques of Constantinople and was built across from the seraglio, which served as both al-Jazzar's administrative headquarters and residence. The mosque complex contained the mosque itself, which is a square building topped by a dome, a portico at the entrance of the mosque, which consisted of five domes and arches supported by free-standing marble columns, a large courtyard with a sundial, and vaulted chambers on the courtyard's eastern, western and northern sides, which are separated from the courtyard by an arcade of arches and columns consisting of white marble and granite. The various vaulted chambers housed the central Islamic court of Acre, an Islamic theological academy, a library and lodging for pilgrims and the academy's pupils. The building material used for the complex came from ancient ruins in Acre, Caesarea and Atlit.

==== Fortifications ====
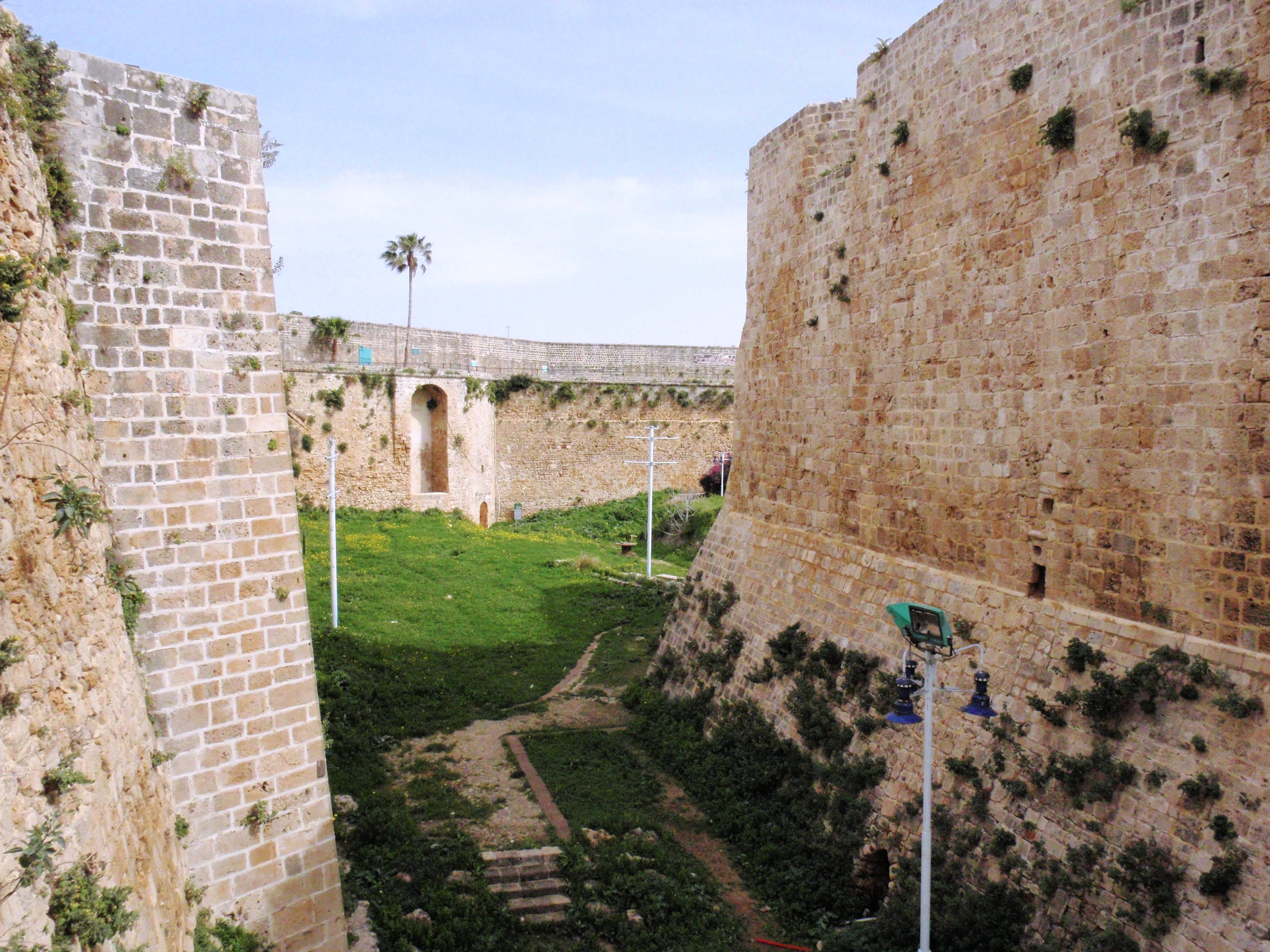
The former moat of Acre and fortifications built by al-Jazzar

Following Napoleon's failed siege, al-Jazzar repaired the relatively thin and vertical wall around Acre, built by Daher, and added a new, extensive wall around it. Al-Jazzar's fortifications included a significantly larger wall than Daher's wall and one which was sloped and thus better placed to defend against the newer artillery of Jazzar's era. The fortifications also included a moat system and towers.

In the seraglio, al-Jazzar built the diwankhanah (guest wing), a spacious area which consisted of three palaces. The largest palace was where al-Jazzar spent most of his time in the day and occasional evenings. It also had a hidden door to the harem, the second major component of the seraglio which was separated from the diwankhanah by a high wall. Only al-Jazzar had the keys to the door of the harem and kept them on his person at all times.

In his older years, al-Jazzar became increasingly reclusive and paranoid. He reportedly retired every evening behind three massive, barred doors that he locked himself. To ensure absolute seclusion, food was delivered to his inner quarters via a turning cylinder or "dumbwaiter" system, meaning no one actually saw who received the dishes.

==== Commercial buildings ====
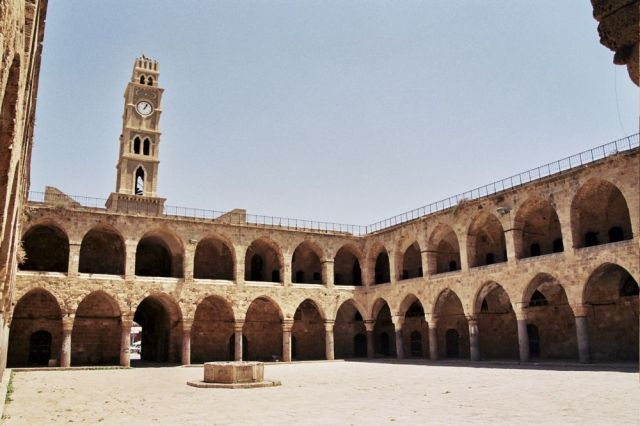
Khan al-Umdan, 2008

Al-Jazzar attached significant importance to Acre's growing commercial economy and had the large Khan al-Umdan caravanserai built in 1784 and enlarged the Khan al-Shawarda, which was built by Daher in the 1760s. Al-Jazzar also commissioned the construction of the Suq al-Jazzar bazaar and a number of relatively minor commercial structures as well. To supply the city with fresh water, al-Jazzar launched major efforts to build an aqueduct that transported water from al-Kabri into Acre. French forces destroyed the aqueduct during their siege, but it was rebuilt by Sulayman Pasha.

In 1781, al-Jazzar had a large hamaam (public bathhouse) built in Acre. The bathhouse is known as "Hammam al-Pasha" and it is among the largest and ornate Ottoman-era bathhouses in Israel. Hammam al-Basha was dedicated as a waqf (endowment) to the el-Jazzar Mosque and is built of granite, marble, porphyry and painted tiles. The hammam closed in the wake of the 1948 Arab-Israeli War, became a museum run by the Municipality of Acre in 1954 and closed again in the 1990s.

== Bibliography ==
- Aksan, Virginia (2014). Ottoman Wars, 1700–1870: An Empire Besieged. Routledge. ISBN 978-1-317-88403-3.
- Barnay, Y. (1992). The Jews in Palestine in the 18th Century. University of Alabama Press. ISBN 978-0-8173-0572-7.
- Buckingham, James Silk (1821). Travels in Palestine Through the Countries of Bashan and Gilead, East of the River Jordan, Including a Visit to the Cities of Geraza and Gamala in the Decapolis. Longman, Hurst, Rees, Orme and Brown.
- Clarke, Edward Daniel (1824). Travels in Various Countries of Europe, Asia and Africa. T. Cadell and W. Davies in the Strand.
- Cohen, Amnon (1973). Palestine in the 18th Century: Patterns of Government and Administration. Jerusalem: The Magnes Press. ISBN 978-0-19-647903-3.
- Douwes, Dick (2000). The Ottomans in Syria: a history of justice and oppression. I.B. Tauris. ISBN 978-1-86064-031-5.
- Filiu, Jean-Pierre (2014). Gaza: A History. Oxford University Press. ISBN 978-0-19-020189-0.
- Finkel, Caroline (2007). Osman's Dream: The History of the Ottoman Empire. Basic Books. ISBN 978-0-465-00850-6.
- Harris, William (2012). Lebanon: A History, 600–2011. OUP USA. ISBN 978-0-19-518111-1.
- Israeli, Raphael; Benabou, Albert (2013). Savagery in the Heart of Europe: The Bosnian War (1992–1995) Context, Perspectives, Personal Experiences, and Memoirs. Strategic Book Publishing. ISBN 978-1-62857-015-1.
- Hass, Jacob (1934). History Of Palestine-The Last Two Thousand Years. The Macmillan Company.
- Joudah, Ahmad Hasan (1987). Revolt in Palestine in the Eighteenth Century: The Era of Shaykh Zahir Al-ʻUmar. Kingston Press. ISBN 978-0-940670-11-2.
- Krämer, Gudrun (2011). A History of Palestine: From the Ottoman Conquest to the Founding of the State of Israel. Princeton University Press. ISBN 978-0-691-15007-9.
- McGregor, Andrew James (2006). A Military History of Modern Egypt: From the Ottoman Conquest to the Ramadan War. Greenwood Publishing Group. ISBN 978-0-275-98601-8.
- Mishaqah, Mikha'il (1988). William McIntosh Thackston (ed.). Murder, Mayhem, Pillage, and Plunder: The History of the Lebanon in the 18th and 19th Centuries by Mikhayil Mishaqa (1800–1873). SUNY Press. ISBN 978-0-88706-712-9.
- Philipp, Thomas (2013). Acre: The Rise and Fall of a Palestinian City, 1730–1831. Columbia University Press. ISBN 978-0-231-50603-8.
- Philipp, Thomas (2004). "The Last Mamluk Household". In Michael Winter; Amalia Levanoni (eds.). The Mamluks in Egyptian and Syrian Politics and Society. BRILL. ISBN 978-90-04-13286-3.
- Philipp, Thomas (1998). The Mamluks in Egyptian Politics and Society. Cambridge University Press. ISBN 978-0-521-59115-7.
- Tott, François (1786). Memoirs of Baron de Tott: Containing the State of the Turkish Empire & the Crimea, during the Late War with Russia. With Numerous Anecdotes, Facts, & Observations, on the Manners & Customs of the Turks & Tartars (2 ed.). G.G.J. & J. Robinson.
- Volney, Constantin-François (1788). Travels Through Syria and Egypt, in the Years 1783, 1784, and 1785: containing the Present Natural and Political State of Those Countries, Their Productions, Arts, Manufactures, and Commerce : with Observations on the Manners, Customs, and Government of the Turks and Arabs : Illustrated. Vol. 2. Printed for G.G.J. and J . Robinson ...
- Wilkins, David L. (2010). Forging Urban Solidarities: Ottoman Aleppo 1640–1700. Brill. ISBN 978-90-04-16907-4.
- Winter, Stefan (2010). The Shiites of Lebanon under Ottoman Rule, 1516–1788. Cambridge University Press. ISBN 978-1-139-48681-1.
- Yazbak, Mahmoud (1998). Haifa in the Late Ottoman Period, A Muslim Town in Transition, 1864–1914. Brill Academic Pub. ISBN 978-90-04-11051-9.

Preceded by Daher al-Umar	Wali of Sidon; 1775–1804	Succeeded by Sulayman Pasha
Preceded by Abdullah Pasha al-Azm	Wali of Damascus; 1803–1804	Succeeded by Ibrahim Pasha Qataraghasi
Preceded by Abdullah Pasha al-Azm	Wali of Damascus; 1798–1799	Succeeded by Abdullah Pasha al-Azm
Preceded by Ibrahim Pasha al-Halabi	Wali of Damascus; 1790–1795	Succeeded by Abdullah Pasha al-Azm
Preceded by Darwish Pasha al-Kurji	Wali of Damascus; 1784–1786	Succeeded by Husayn Pasha Battal
