= El-Jazzar Mosque =

Mosque in Acre, Israel

- מסגד אל-ג'זאר
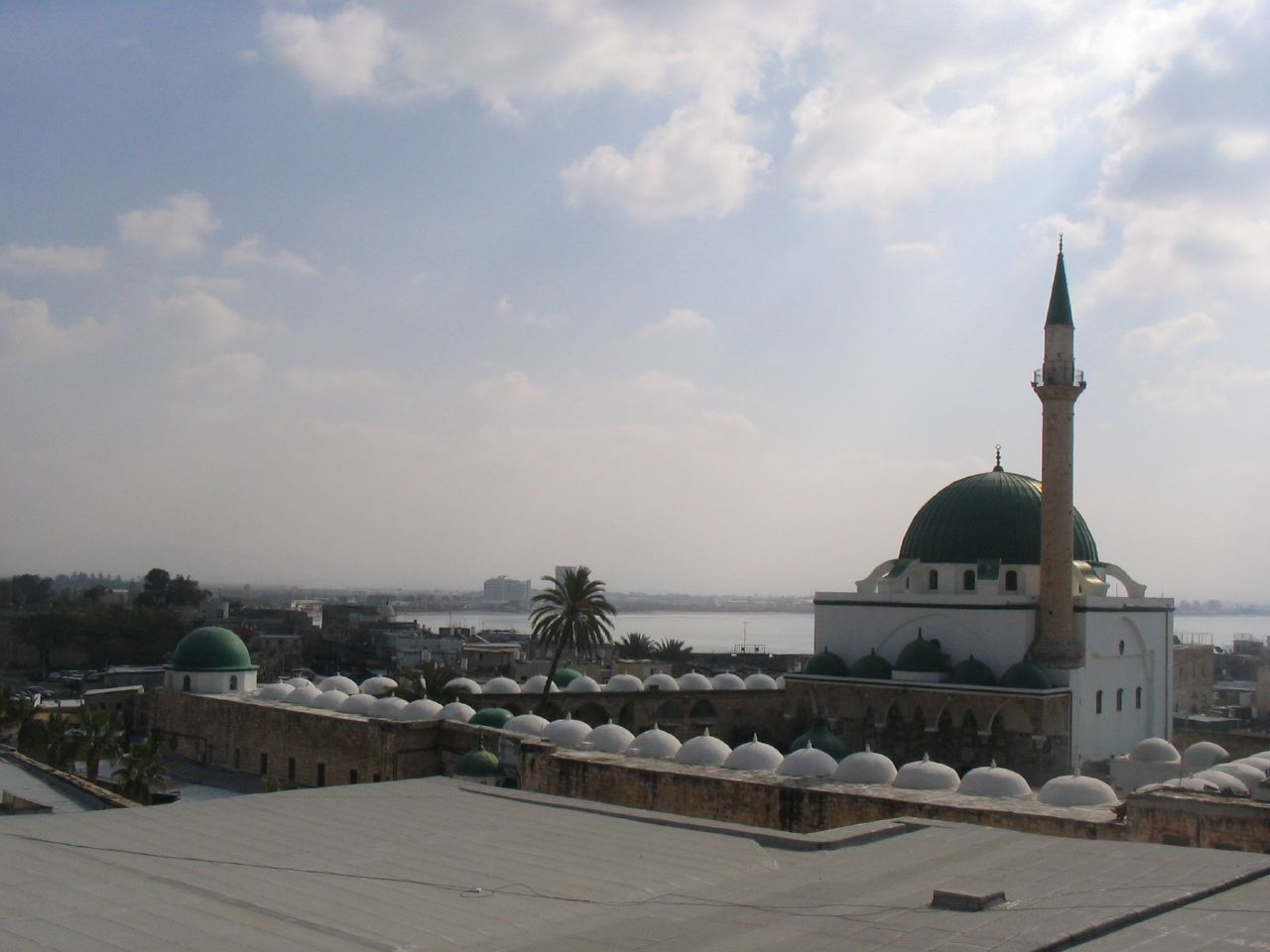

- Location within Northwest Israel

Religion
- Affiliation: Islam
- Branch/tradition: Sunni

Location
- Location: Acre, Northern, Israel
- Coordinates: 32°55′21.74″N 35°4′13.13″E

Architecture
- Type: mosque
- Style: Ottoman
- Founder: Jazzar Pasha
- Completed: 1781
- Minaret: 1

The el-Jazzar Mosque (Arabic: مسجد الجزار, Masjid al-Jazzār; Hebrew: מסגד אל-ג'זאר, Misgad al-G'zar), also known as the White Mosque of Acre, is located on el-Jazzar Street inside the walls of the old city of Acre, Israel, overlooking the eastern Mediterranean Sea. It is named after the Ottoman Bosnian governor Ahmad Pasha el-Jazzar.

== History ==
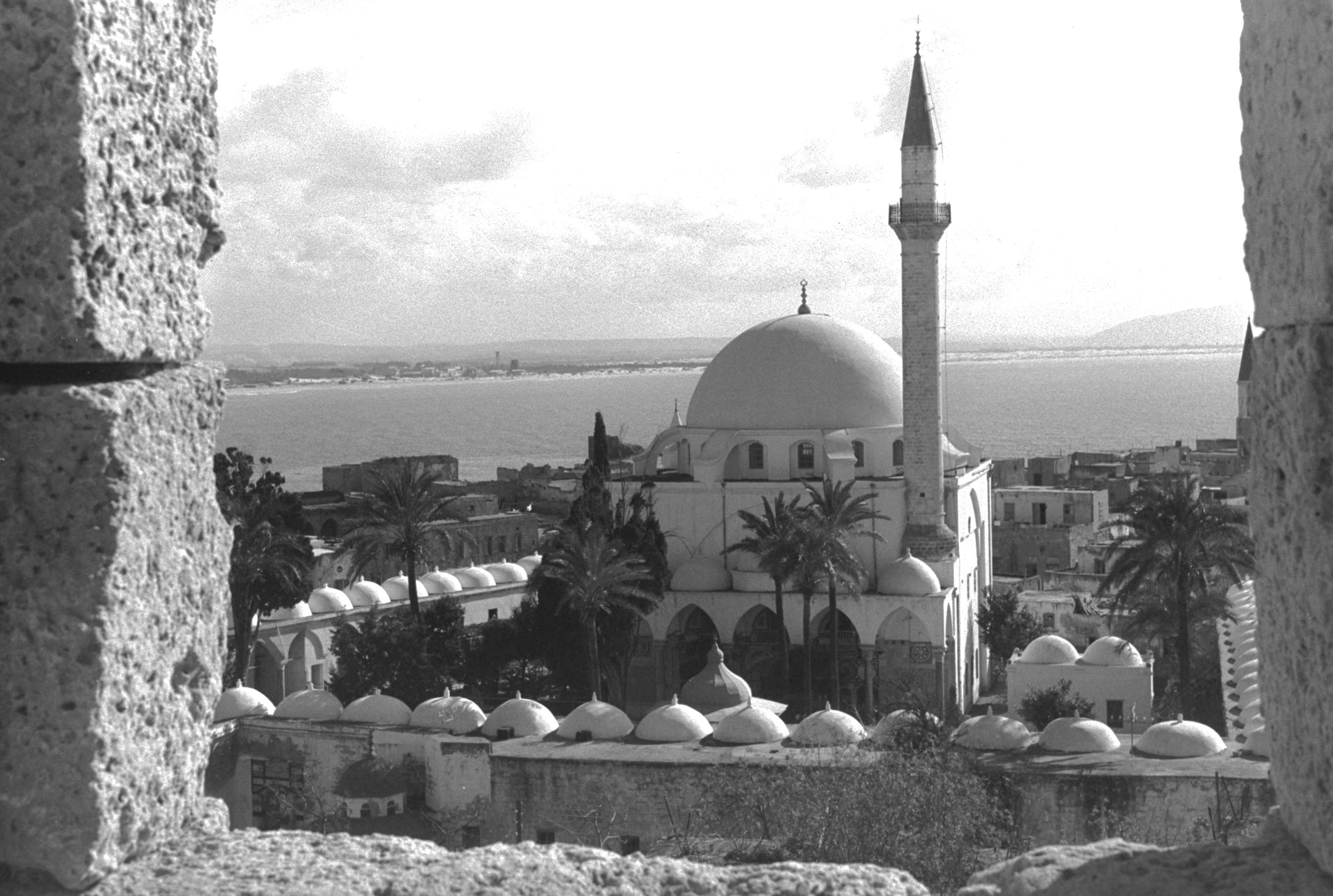
Mosque of "El Jaazar" Pasha against Haifa bay, Acre. March 1959

The el-Jazzar Mosque was the project of its namesake, Ahmad Pasha el-Jazzar, the Acre-based governor of the Sidon and Damascus provinces, who was famous for his impressive public works and defeat of Napoleon Bonaparte at the Siege of Acre in 1799. El-Jazzar ordered the mosque's construction in 1781 and had it completed within the year. Despite lacking architectural training, el-Jazzar was the architect of the mosque, drawing up its plans and design, and supervising its entire construction. In addition to the mosque itself, the complex included an Islamic theological academy with student lodging, an Islamic court and a public library. The mosque was built for religious purposes, but its grandiose size and additional functions were also intended by el-Jazzar to serve as a means of consolidating his political legitimacy as ruler of Ottoman Syria. He modeled the mosque on the mosques of Istanbul, the Ottoman capital.

The el-Jazzar Mosque was built over former Muslim and Christian prayer houses and other Crusader buildings, including military architecture. Building materials for the mosque, particularly its marble and granite components, were taken from the ancient ruins of Caesarea, Atlit and medieval Acre. El-Jazzar commissioned several Greek masons as the mosque's builders. There is a tughra (calligraphic monogram) on a marble disc inside the gate, naming the ruling Sultan and his father and bearing the legend "ever-victorious."

Adjacent to the mosque is a mausoleum and a small graveyard containing the tombs of Jazzar Pasha and his adoptive son and successor, Sulayman Pasha, and their relatives.

== Architecture ==
The mosque is an excellent example of Ottoman architecture. Some of its fine features include the green dome and minaret, a green-domed sabil next to its steps (a kiosk, built by Sultan Abdul Hamid II, for dispensing chilled drinking water and beverages) and a large courtyard.

The mosque, which dominates Acre's skyline, was originally named Masjid al-Anwar (the "Great Mosque of Lights") and is also known as the White Mosque because of its once silvery-white dome that glittered at a great distance. The dome is now painted green. The minaret has a winding staircase of 124 steps.

It is the largest mosque in modern-day Israel outside of Jerusalem.

Historian Nur Masalha describes the Mosque as notable for its "mixture of styles, Ottoman Byzantine, Palestinian, and Persian, incorporating and recycling the extraordinarily rich martial and cultural heritage of Palestine."

== Sha'r an-Nabi ==
The mosque houses the Sha'r an-Nabi, a hair (or lock of hair) from the beard of the Prophet Muhammad. The Sha'r an-Nabi is kept inside the mosque in a glass cabinet and used to be paraded through Acre on Eid al-Fitr, ending the fast of Ramadan, but is now only shown to the congregation. The relic is kept inside the mosque in a glass cabinet placed at the women's upper floor gallery.

== The secret of the poetic verses engraved on the door of Al-Jazzar Mosque ==
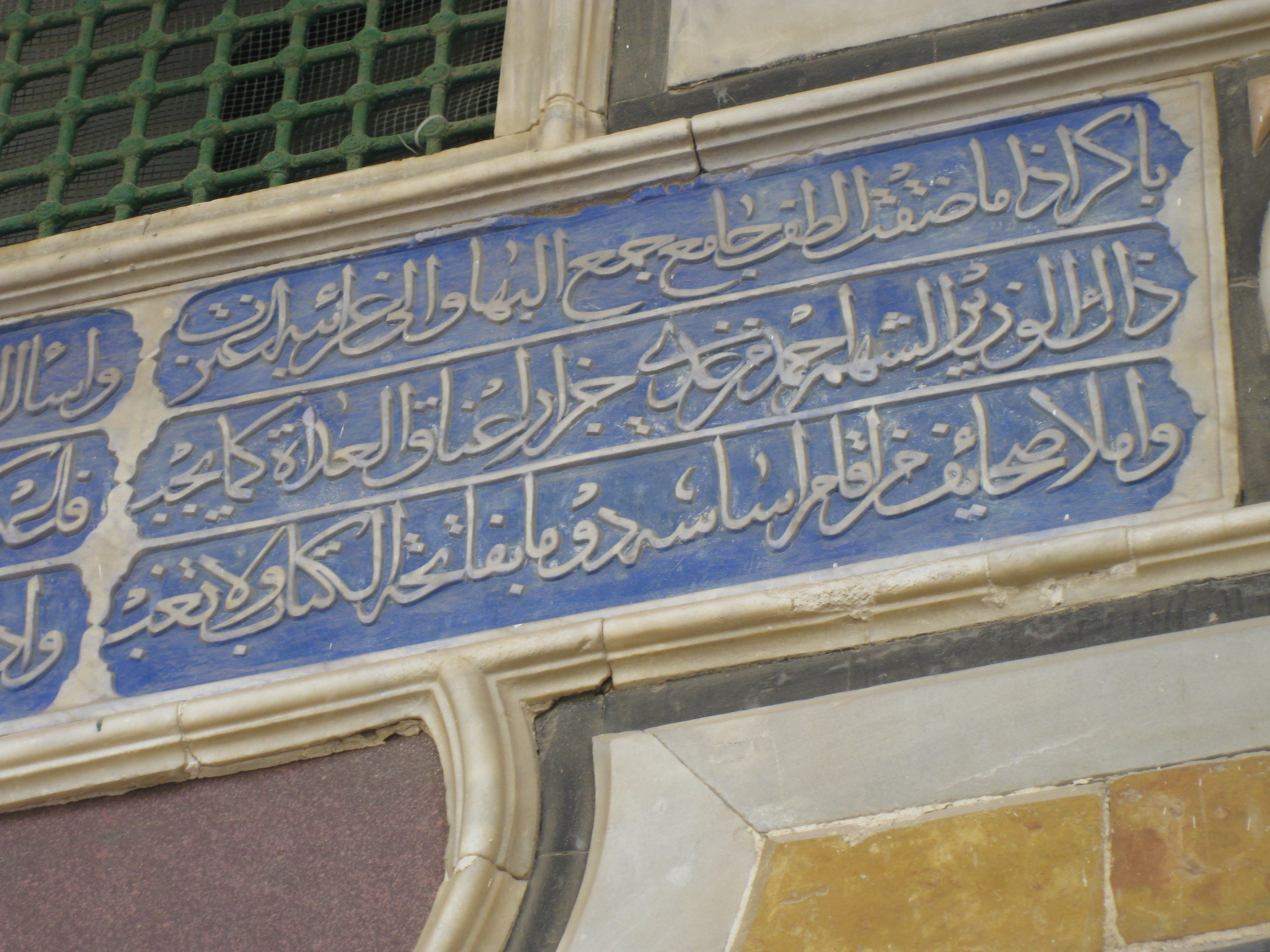

In the entrance of the mosque that was built nearly 250 years ago, six poetic verses were engraved in blue marble, which have long perplexed the locals regarding their meanings, the identity of their writer, their occasion, and their purpose:

"When you visit the most beautiful mosque early in the morning, Marvel at its wonders and be awed.

Ask your God to eternally sustain He who erected it and responds to all prayers.

That bold statesman Ahmad, who became the butcher of the necks of enemies as deserved.

So devote yourself to God's remembrance in its gardens, ad work sincerely for God's sake.

Fill the pages of the one who laid its foundations, Aaways with the opening of the Scripture, never neglect it.

And when you pass by it you will find its date, Ss worship your Lord, draw near, and bow down in proximity."

The author of the poem is the Judge, the Sheikh, and jurist Yusuf bin Ahmad al-Rimawi al-Hashemi. He wrote it addressing his son Sheikh and jurist Ahmed on the eve of him inheriting the position of judge from him. The father urges the son to go early to the Jazzar Mosque in order to assume the position and adjudicate between people and then pray for the one who built it.

After that, the poem moves on to mention the virtues of Al-Jazzar, and it ends by urging sincerity in work and gratitude to God through worship, prayer and prostration. It states that judges fear God and know that adjudication is a huge responsibility.

== Gallery ==
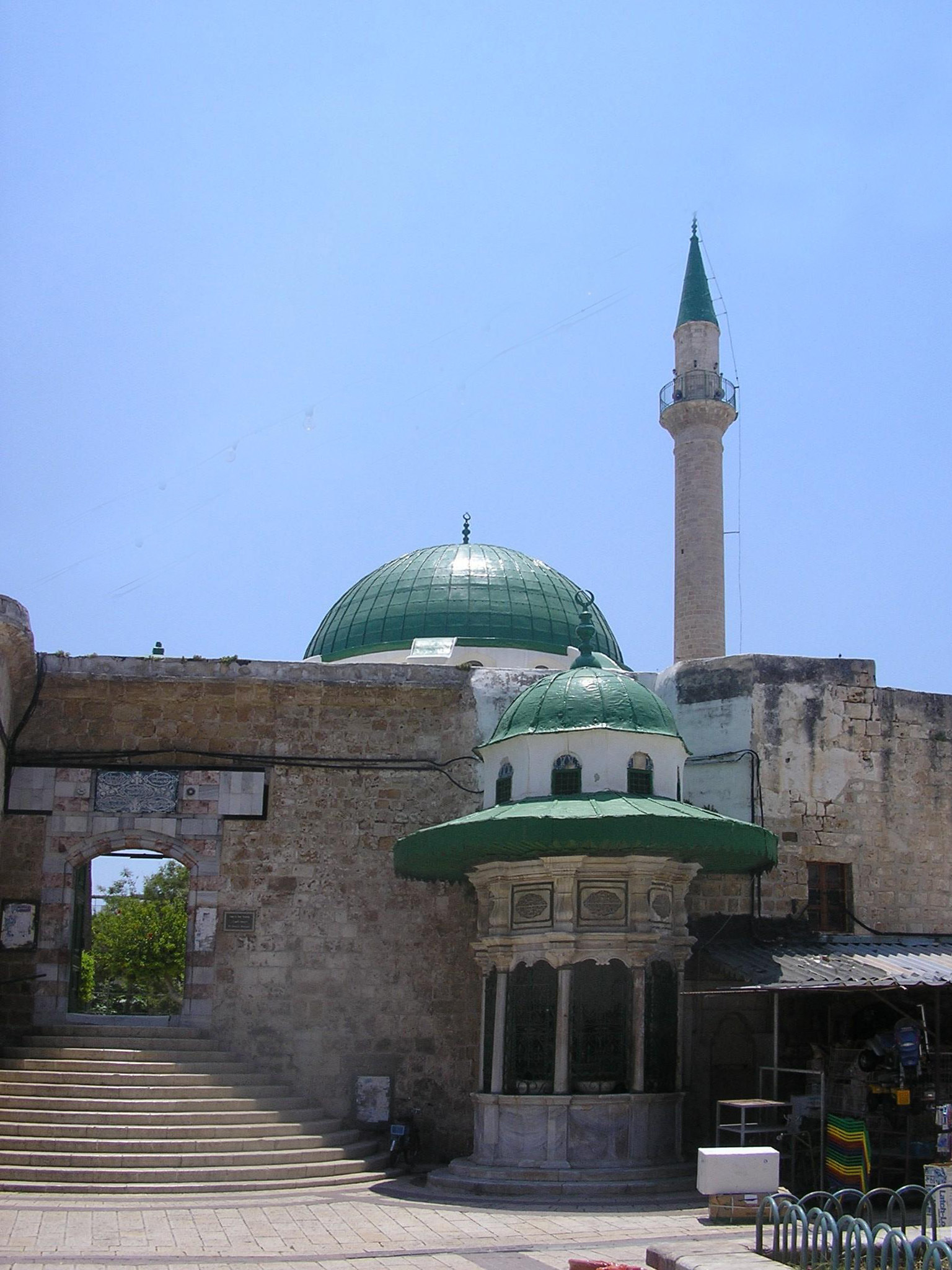
Entrance to the mosque, with the sabil to the right of the steps.

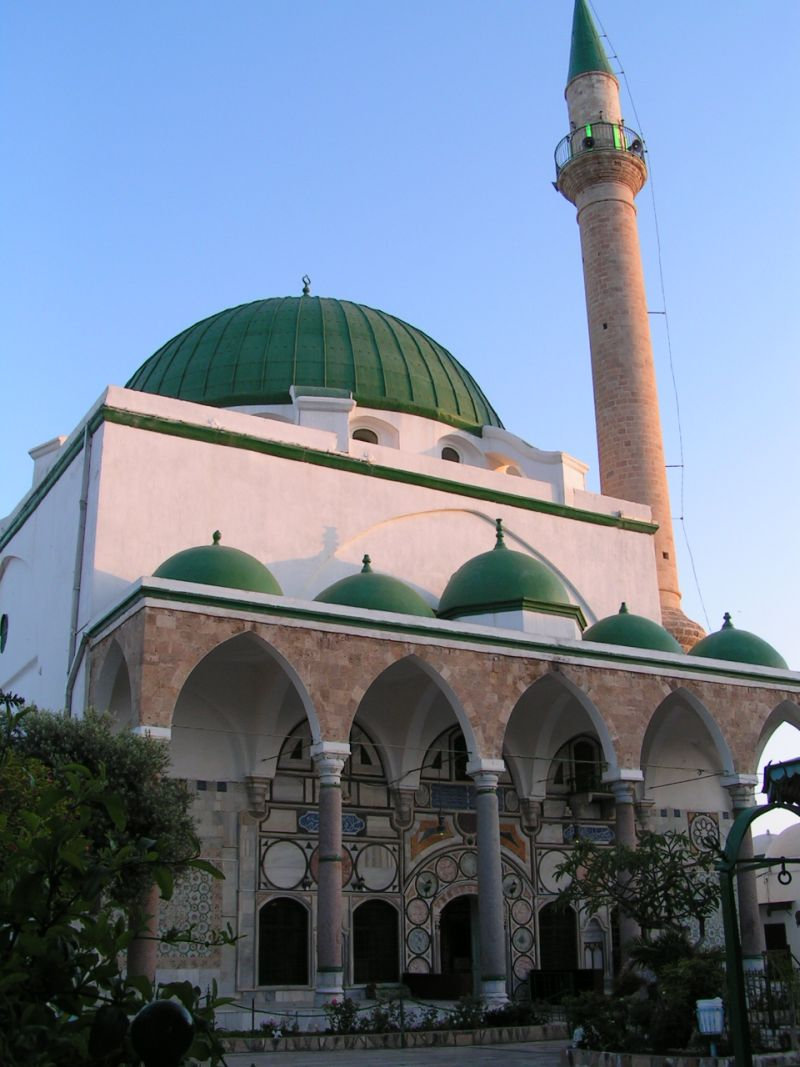
Entrance to el-Jazzar Mosque

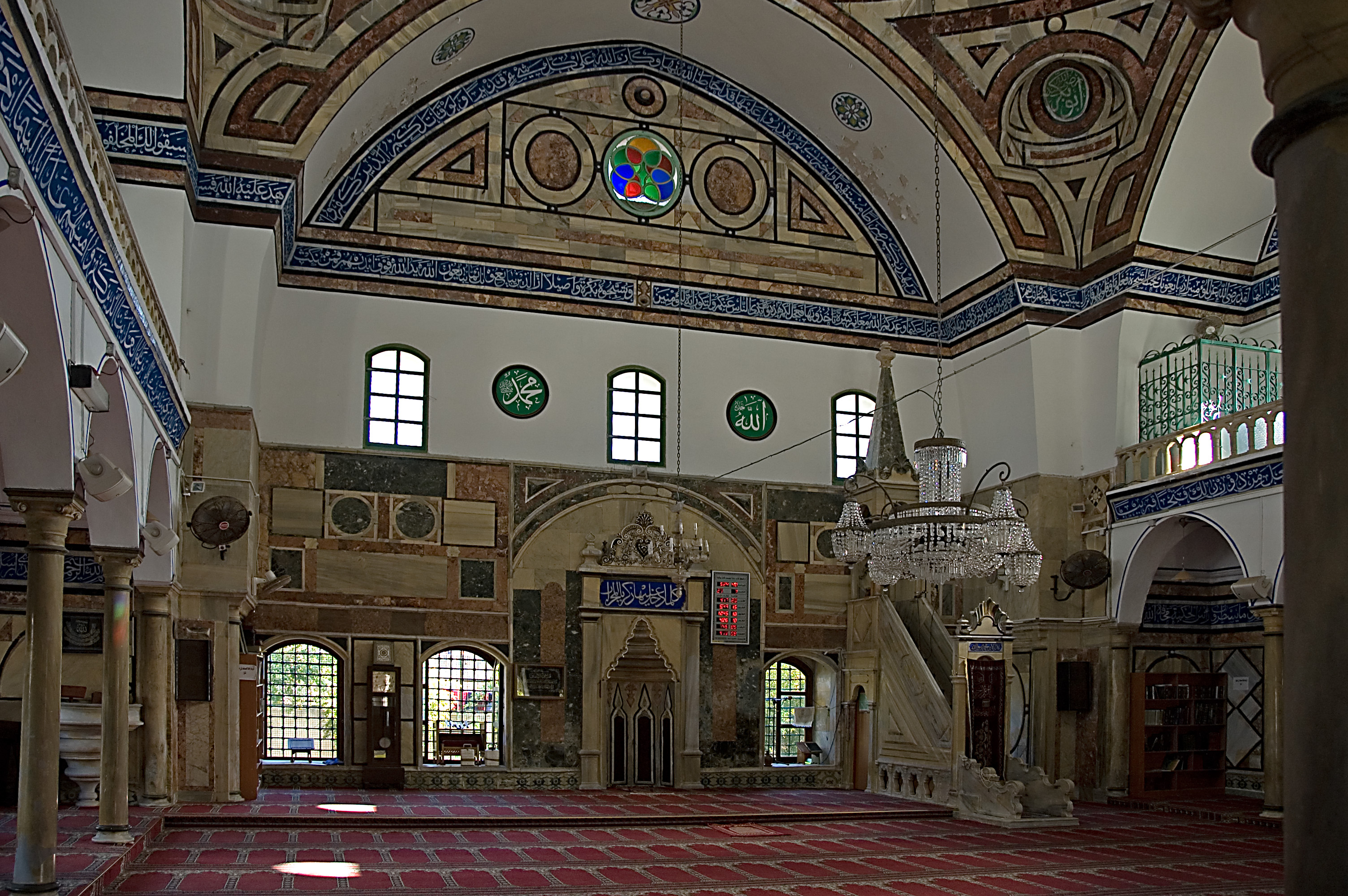
El-Jazzar Mosque Interior

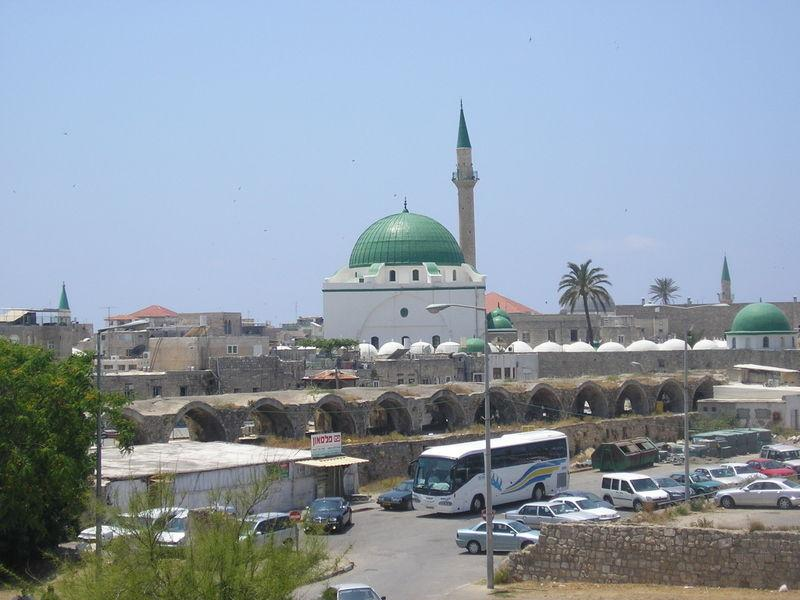
Long distant view

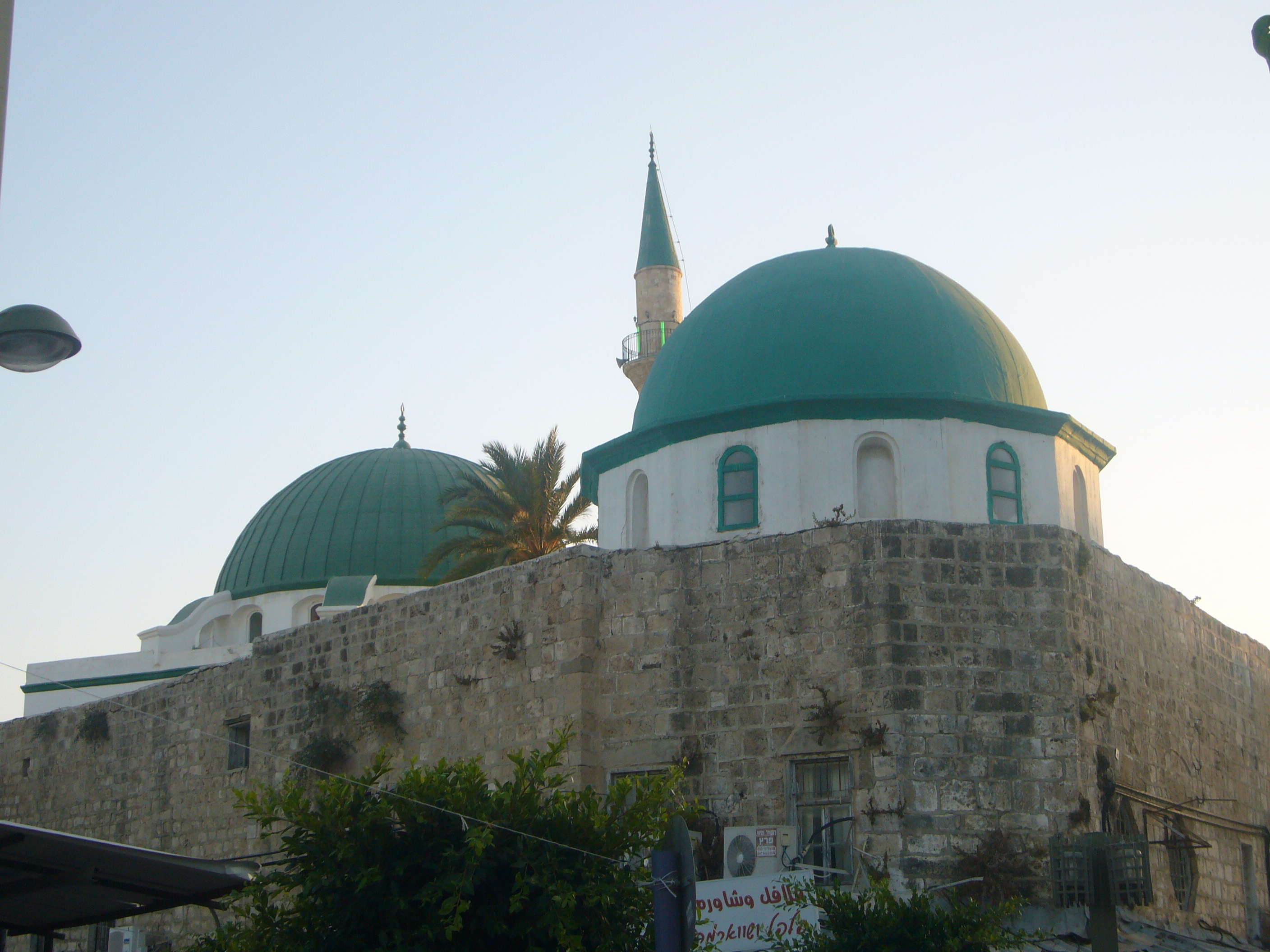
El-Jazzar Mosque

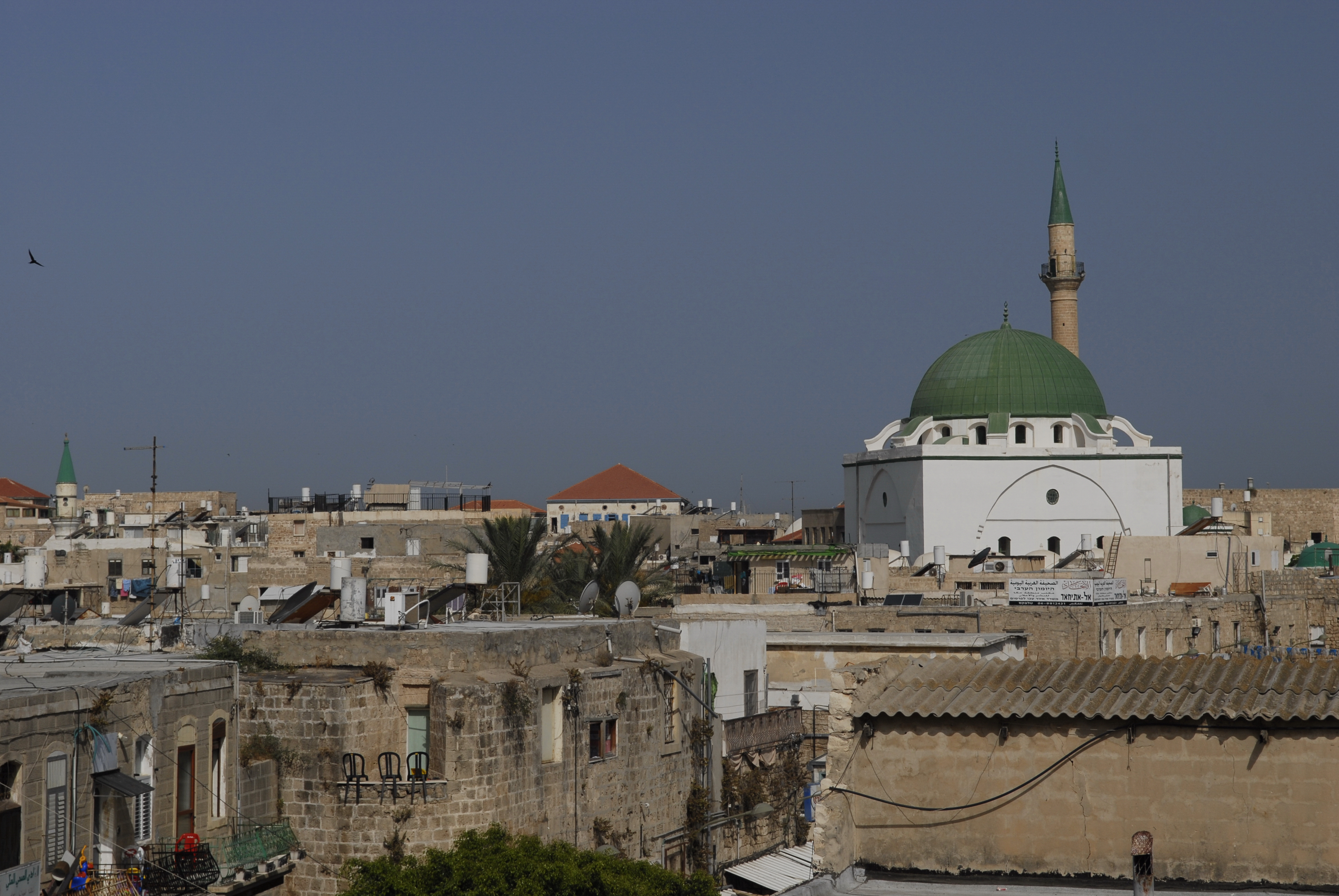
El-Jazzar Mosque

== See also ==
- Islam in Israel
- List of mosques in Israel
