= Ibrahim Pasha Qataraghasi =

Ottoman statesman

Wali of Aleppo
- In office 1807–1808
- Monarch: Mahmud II
- Preceded by: Müftizâde Ahmed Pasha
- Succeeded by: Kör Yusuf Ziyaüddin Pasha
- In office 1802 – 1804 (or 1805)
- Monarch: Mahmud I
- Preceded by: Nasuh Pasha al-Azm
- Succeeded by: Muhammad Hameed Pasha

Wali of Damascus
- In office 1804–1805
- Monarch: Mahmud I
- Preceded by: Ahmad Pasha al-Jazzar
- Succeeded by: Abdullah Pasha al-Azm

Military service
- Allegiance: Ottoman Empire
- Commands: Amir al-hajj (1805); Commander of Aleppo's Hajj caravan (1770s–1780s)

Ibrahim Pasha Qatarağasi (nisba also spelled Qattar Aghasi or Qataraghasi) was an Ottoman statesman who served as wali (governor) of the Aleppo, Damascus, Diyarbekir and Tripoli eyalets (provinces) in the early 19th century.

== Early career ==
Most likely of Turkish origin, there is scarce information about Ibrahim Pasha's early life. However, in the 1770s and 1780s, he served as a trusted retainer of Muhammad Taha (Mehmed Effeni Tahazade), the naqib al-ashraf (head of the order of Muhammad's descendants) of Aleppo. Muhammad Taha served the office for 25 years (in 1747–1767 and 1782–1786), and was able to unify the city's ashraf into a political and military force that confronted Aleppo's powerful Janissary faction. Taha tasked Ibrahim Pasha (then known as "Ibrahim Agha") with collecting taxes in Aleppo's rural hinterland (Taha owned several tax farms in this area), enabling him to accumulate significant wealth.

During his career, Ibrahim Pasha commanded the armed guard of Aleppo's Hajj pilgrim caravan, known as the qatar, which connected with the much larger Damascus caravan before its departure for Mecca. He was thus given the nisba Qataraghasi (agha of the qatar). Following Taha's death in 1786, Ibrahim Pasha succeeded him as the virtual leader of Aleppo's ashraf faction, but not as naqib al-ashraf. Between 1788 and 1798, he served as mutasallim (chief tax collector, district governor) of Aleppo. In 1799, he served a brief assignment as wali (governor) of Damascus Eyalet. That year, he also led a contingent of Aleppan ashraf forces against the French invasion of the empire's Egyptian and Syrian lands.

== Governorship of Aleppo and Damascus ==
In 1802, he was appointed as wali of Aleppo Eyalet by the Sublime Porte (Ottoman imperial government). In 1804, while the longtime wali of Sidon and Damascus, Jazzar Pasha, was on his deathbed, the Porte quietly appointed Ibrahim Pasha as his successor in both provinces. Jazzar Pasha died in April–May 1804, and Ibrahim Pasha subsequently entered Damascus to assume office there. He then besieged Jazzar Pasha's headquarters in Acre, where an officer named Isma'il Pasha barricaded himself as governor of the city in defiance of the Porte. Ibrahim Pasha could not continue the siege himself because he had to begin a tax collection tour in the Syrian districts to fund the upcoming Hajj caravan. Instead, he entrusted the siege to Jazzar Pasha's senior mamluk, Sulayman Pasha, who was subsequently appointed wali of Sidon and ultimately defeated Isma'il Pasha. As wali of Damascus, Ibrahim Pasha was also amir al-hajj (commander of the Hajj caravan) and led the caravan to Mecca in January 1805.

While Ibrahim Pasha was serving his Damascus assignment, he was still wali of Aleppo and installed his son Muhammad (Hameed) pasha to administer the province's affairs on his behalf. However, a revolt in Aleppo in 1804 by the Janissaries, the ashraf and the Christians against his son's heavy-handed rule. The rebels ousted Ibrahim Pasha's son, who returned two months later but with only ceremonial leadership. In 1805, Ibrahim Pasha rallied the ashraf to his side and entered into heavy street battles with the Janissaries for a week before being dismissed from the governorship.

Ibrahim Pasha's first term in Damascus was relatively short and was succeeded by Abdullah Pasha al-Azm later, in 1805. He then served assignments as wali of Tripoli Eyalet and Diyarbekir Eyalet, until being reappointed to Aleppo, from 1807 to 1808. Sultan Mahmud II came to power in July 1808 and dismissed Ibrahim Pasha from Aleppo.

== Later life and legacy ==
Thereafter, Ibrahim Pasha retired or was speculatively forced to retire from politics. Ibrahim Pasha's dismissal paved the way for the Janissaries' domination of Aleppan politics until 1813, when their commanders were trapped and massacred by Aleppo's wali at the time, Jelal al-Din Pasha. Ibrahim Pasha's descendants, known as the "Qatarghasi Zade", became a prominent political family in Ottoman Aleppo.

== Bibliography ==
- Masters, Bruce (2013). The Arabs of the Ottoman Empire, 1516–1918: A Social and Cultural History. Cambridge University Press. ISBN 978-1-107-06779-0.
- Meriwether, Margaret L. (1999). The Kin Who Count: Family and Society in Ottoman Aleppo, 1770-1840. University of Texas Press. ISBN 9780292788145.
- Philipp, T. (2013). Acre: The Rise and Fall of a Palestinian City, 1730-1831. Columbia University Press. ISBN 9780231506038.

Political offices
Preceded by Nasuh Pasha al-Azm	Wali of Aleppo; 1802–1805	Succeeded by Hamid Hamud Mehmed Pasha
Preceded by Ahmad Pasha al-Jazzar	Wali of Damascus; 1804–1805	Succeeded by Abdullah Pasha al-Azm
Preceded by Müftizâde Ahmed Pasha	Wali of Aleppo; 1807–1808	Succeeded by Kör Yusuf Ziyaüddin Pasha
