= Muhammad Pasha al-Azm =

- Monarchs: Mustafa III (1757–1774); Abdul Hamid I (1774–1789)

Wali of Damascus
- In office 1771–1772
- Preceded by: Uthman Pasha al-Kurji
- Succeeded by: Hafiz Mustafa Pasha Bustanci
- In office 1773–1783
- Preceded by: Hafiz Mustafa Pasha Bustanci
- Succeeded by: Mehmed Pasha al-Kurji

Wali of Sidon
- In office 1763–1770
- Preceded by: Nu'man Pasha
- Succeeded by: Darwish Pasha al-Kurji

Personal details
- Died: 1783 Damascus, Damascus Eyalet, Ottoman Empire
- Children: Abdullah Pasha al-Azm
- Parent: As'ad Pasha al-Azm (father)

Muhammad Pasha al-Azm was the Ottoman governor of Sidon Eyalet (1763–1770) and Damascus Eyalet (1771–72 and 1773–83). He was a member of the prominent al-Azm family, the son of a former governor As'ad Pasha al-Azm.

During Muhammad Pasha's time in office, Damascus was experiencing a peak in its prosperity, although its political clout in the Levant was being overshadowed by the rulers of Acre, first Zahir al-Umar and then Jezzar Pasha. Muhammad Pasha administered the city well and commissioned numerous building projects. Among the new constructions were the Abdullah al-Azm Madrasa near the Azm Palace, and the Suq al-Jadid (New Market) between the Suq al-Arwam and the Citadel of Damascus. He married off one of his daughters to Jezzar Pasha which was intended to signify an alliance between the two governors, although they remained rivals nonetheless.

Muhammad Pasha's death in 1783 largely marked the end of the al-Azm family's political dominance in Ottoman Syria, although the family continued to be influential well after the end of Ottoman rule in 1917. Muhammad Pasha's son, Abdullah Pasha, was the last governor of Damascus from the al-Azm family.

== Bibliography ==
- Burns, Ross (2005). Damascus: A History. London: Routledge. ISBN 0-415-27105-3.
- Khoury, Phillip S. (2003). Urban Notables and Arab Nationalism: The Politics of Damascus 1860–1920. Cambridge University Press. ISBN 9780521533232.

Regnal titles
Preceded by Hafiz Mustafa Pasha Bustanji	Wali of Damascus; 1773–83	Succeeded by Muhammad Pasha al-Kurji
Regnal titles
Preceded by Uthman Pasha al-Kurji	Wali of Damascus; 1771–72	Succeeded by Hafiz Mustafa Pasha Bustanji
Regnal titles
Preceded by Nu'man Pasha	Wali of Sidon; 1763–70	Succeeded by Darwish Pasha al-Kurji
