= Abdullah Pasha al-Azm =

Ottoman statesman (died 1809)

Abdullah al-Azm Pasha

Wali of Damascus
- In office 1805–1807
- Preceded by: Ibrahim Pasha Qataraghasi
- Succeeded by: Kunj Yusuf Pasha
- In office 1799–1803
- Preceded by: Jazzar Pasha
- Succeeded by: Jazzar Pasha
- In office 1795–1798
- Preceded by: Jazzar Pasha
- Succeeded by: Jazzar Pasha

Wali of Egypt
- In office 1798–1799
- Preceded by: Lokmacı Hacı Ebubekir Pasha
- Succeeded by: Nasuh Pasha al-Azm

Wali of Aleppo
- In office 1794–1795
- Succeeded by: Ibrahim Pasha al-Halabi

Personal details
- Died: 1809 Hama, Damascus Eyalet, Ottoman Empire
- Relations: Al-Azm family
- Children: Muhammad Yadu; Hafiz Bey; Ahmad Bey; Fatima
- Parent: Muhammad Pasha al-Azm (father)

Abdullah Pasha al-Azm (fl. 1783–1809) was an Ottoman statesman who served as the governor of the Damascus Eyalet (three separate terms, 1795–1807), Aleppo Eyalet (1794), Egypt Eyalet (1798), Adana Eyalet, and Rakka Eyalet (1809), before retiring to Hama in the 1810s. He was a member of the prominent political family, Al-Azm.

== Early career ==
Abdullah Pasha served under his father Muhammad Pasha al-Azm, who was governor of Damascus Eyalet (1771, 1773–1783), as the governor of Tripoli Eyalet and as amir al-hajj, the commander of the army tasked with supplying food to the pilgrim caravan returning to Syria from the Hajj (annual pilgrimage to Mecca). Abdullah Pasha was appointed to the governorship of Aleppo Eyalet in 1794.

== Governor of Damascus ==
After serving one year as Aleppo's wali (provincial governor), Abdullah Pasha was transferred to Damascus Eyalet in 1795. He replaced his longtime rival, Jazzar Pasha who ruled Damascus from his stronghold in Acre, then capital of Sidon Eyalet. Abdullah Pasha's appointment was well received by the population of Damascus, who had prospered under the relatively long and peaceful rule of his father, as well as the other previous members of his al-Azm family, like As'ad Pasha and Sulayman Pasha, who also served terms as governors. Abdullah Pasha immediately had As'ad Effendi al-Mahasini, the Mufti of Damascus and ally of Jazzar, replaced with Abd al-Rahman Effendi al-Muradi.

Abdullah Pasha's first term ended in 1798 after a revolt by Ibrahim Pasha al-Halabi of Aleppo. Jazzar soon became the unofficial power in the city when his troops entered the city later that year. When he was reappointed governor by Grand Vizier Yusuf Ziya Pasha in 1799, seven months after his dismissal, Abdullah Pasha had several of his opponents executed by hanging at the start of his second term. One of those executed was Abu Hamza, a close ally of Abdullah Pasha's rival, Jazzar Pasha, who ran affairs in Damascus proper along with Muhammad Aqil on behalf of Jazzar, who continued to reside in Acre.

Following the occupation of Mecca by the Wahhabi-Saudi alliance in 1803, Jazzar once again replaced Abdullah Pasha as governor. Abdullah Pasha had led the annual Hajj caravan to the Islamic holy city, but received what was considered a humiliating reception by the Wahhabi occupiers. He was dismissed while besieging Tripoli to arrest an ally of Jazzar, Mustafa Agha Barbar. Meanwhile, another ally of Jazzar and the mutasallim (tax collector/enforcer) of Homs, Abdullah Agha al-Mahmud, laid siege to the Azm stronghold of Hama. Abdullah Pasha resisted his dismissal, abruptly withdrawing from the siege to relieve Hama. On the way to the city, his troops plundered some of the hinterland villages of the Talkalakh and Akkar areas. During the battle for Hama, Abdullah Pasha's forces decisively defeated Jazzar's allies, killing Abdullah Agha. Many of the latter's fleeing troops were attacked by Bedouin tribes. Although Hama suffered heavy civilian casualties, Jazzar's allies suffered a severe blow. In Damascus, the mufti al-Muradi, previously appointed by Abdullah Pasha, was imprisoned by Muhammad Aqil and died in his cell. Aqil was later brought to Acre and executed on Jazzar's orders to placate the outrage of the Ottoman imperial government.

From Hama, Abdullah Pasha led his troops towards Damascus and upon his army's arrival, the residents of the outskirts withdrew into the inner city out of fear. He was unable to capture the city, however, as a result of a mutiny. Abdullah Pasha apparently failed to pay his troops, who were in any case hesitant to confront the imperial garrison of Damascus. After Jazzar's death in 1804, Abdullah Pasha was reassigned as governor for a third term. Jazzar's death was celebrated by the inhabitants of Damascus, who resented his brutal reign.

Abdullah Pasha was removed from office for the final time in 1807, the de facto Wahhabi rulers of Mecca refused to allow the caravan to perform the pilgrimage upon their arrival to the city, despite the fulfillment of the customary payment to Mecca's inhabitants, both the wealthy and impoverished. Abdullah Pasha had refused to adhere to the Wahhabis' demand that the security of the caravan enter the Islamic edifices unarmed and without the mahmal, a ceremonial decorated camel-borne litter. It was the first time the Hajj caravan of Syria was unable to proceed with their pilgrimage since 1757. Abdullah Pasha was replaced by his senior aide Kunj Yusuf Pasha.

According to Dick Douwes, an expert in Ottoman history, Abdullah Pasha's rule as governor "failed to fulfill [the] high expectations" of the Damascene population who had fared well under Abdullah Pasha's father Muhammad Pasha, and Abdullah Pasha was not remembered "as a just ruler, but as a rapacious one." However, most of the violent actions of his rule were attributed to high-ranking officials of his government, especially Darwish Agha. Abdullah Pasha was the last member of the al-Azm family to govern Damascus.

== Later assignments and death ==
Following his return to Syria and dismissal from office in Damascus, Abdullah Pasha was assigned to brief terms as wali of Adana Eyalet and then to Urfa Eyalet until the early 1810s. According to Douwes, he retired to his residence in Hama after serving in Urfa, but Linda Schatkowski Schilcher writes that he died in Hama in 1809.

Abdullah Pasha left five sons and four daughters. One of his sons, Hafiz Bey, served as a mutasallim of Damascus when the Egyptian forces of Muhammad Ali conquered the Levant. Hafiz was accommodating to the new Egyptian rulers. Abdullah Pasha's eldest son Muhammad Yadu strengthened the al-Azm family's wide array of assets when he married his paternal cousin Asiya al-Azm. Another of his sons was Ahmad Bey, who owned property at Khitab. Fatima al-Azm was Abdullah Pasha's only daughter to get married, wedding a distant relative, Akif, the son of the Egypt-based Khadija al-Azm.

== See also ==
- List of Ottoman governors of Damascus
- List of Ottoman governors of Egypt

== Bibliography ==
- Douwes, Dick (2000). The Ottomans in Syria: a history of justice and oppression. I.B. Tauris. ISBN 1860640311.
- Misaqa, Miha'il (1988). Murder, Mayhem, Pillage and Plunder: The History of Lebanon in the 18th and 19th Centuries. SUNY Press. ISBN 1438421990.
- Phillip, T. (2001). Acre: The Rise and Fall of a Palestinian City, 1730-1831. Columbia University Press. ISBN 0231123272.
- Schilcher, Linda Schatkowski (1985). Families in politics: Damascene factions and estates of the 18th and 19th centuries. F. Stein. ISBN 3515031464.

Preceded by Jazzar Pasha	Wali of Damascus; 1804-1807	Succeeded by Kunj Yusuf Pasha
Preceded by Jazzar Pasha	Wali of Damascus; 1799-1803	Succeeded by Jazzar Pasha
Preceded by Lokmacı Hacı Ebubekir Pasha	Wali of Damascus; November 1798-August 1799	Succeeded by Nasuh Pasha al-Azm
Preceded by Jazzar Pasha	Wali of Damascus; 1795-1798	Succeeded by Jazzar Pasha
