= Ibrahim Deli Pasha =

Ottoman governor of Damascus from 1788 to 1790

Ibrahim Deli Pasha Pasha

Wali of Damascus
- In office 1788–1790
- Preceded by: Abdi Pasha
- Succeeded by: Ahmad Pasha al-Jazzar

Ibrahim Deli Pasha (also known in Arabic as Ibrahim Pasha al-Dalati) was an Ottoman Kurd who served as the governor of Damascus in 1788.

== Life ==
Ibrahim was a Kurdish professional soldier who entered the service of the Azm family, members of which served as the governors of Damascus and surrounding provinces throughout the 18th century. He served a stint as governor of Tripoli, his dismissal was engineered by Ahmad Pasha al-Jazzar, the Acre-based governor of Sidon.

Ibrahim was appointed governor of Damascus in 1788. After his return from Mecca he led the annual Hajj caravan that same year. The Janissaries of the Citadel of Damascus and the aghawat of al-Midan revolted against him. Ibrahim relocated to Hama to rally troops with the sanction of the imperial government in Constantinople. Ibrahim marched on Damascus with his mercenary troops. Ibrahim's troops included Druze from Mount Lebanon. He besieged the citadel, eventually securing the submission of the Janissaries after mediation led by Mulla Isma'il and including the city's religious notables as well as the Kurdish cavalry stationed in the city.

== Bibliography ==
- Douwes, Dick (2000). The Ottomans in Syria: a history of justice and oppression. I.B. Tauris. ISBN 1860640311.
