= Darwish Pasha al-Kurji =

18th-century Ottoman statesman

Wali of Sidon
- In office September 1770 – October 1771
- Monarch: Mahmud II
- Preceded by: Muhammad Pasha al-Azm
- Succeeded by: Recep Pasha (de jur); Zahir al-Umar (de facto)

Wali of Damascus
- In office June 1783 – 1784
- Monarch: Mahmud II
- Preceded by: Muhammad Pasha al-Kurji
- Succeeded by: Ahmad Pasha al-Jazzar

Personal details
- Relations: Muhammad Pasha al-Kurji (brother)
- Parent: Uthman Pasha al-Kurji

Darwish Pasha al-Kurji (also known as Osmanzade Dervish Pasha) was an Ottoman statesman who served as wali (governor) of Sidon in 1770–1771 and Damascus in 1783–1784. He was the son of Uthman Pasha al-Kurji, who was of Georgian origin.

Darwish Pasha owed his assignment as Wali of Sidon in September 1771 to his father's influence with the Sublime Porte (Ottoman imperial government). Darwish Pasha was dismissed from Sidon in October 1771 after fleeing Sidon after arrival of the rebellious Arab sheikh of Galilee, Zahir al-Umar, who occupied the city. Darwish Pasha was subsequently appointed wali of Karaman in November. He was appointed wali of Damascus in June 1783, replacing his brother Muhammad Pasha al-Kurji who died shortly after taking office. However, the Sublime Porte deemed Darwish Pasha to be incompetent and ultimately replaced him with Ahmad Pasha al-Jazzar.

== Bibliography ==
- Joudah, Ahmad Hasan (1987). Revolt in Palestine in the Eighteenth Century: The Era of Shaykh Zahir Al-ʻUmar. Kingston Press. ISBN 978-0-940670-11-2.
- Philipp, T. (2001). Acre: The Rise and Fall of a Palestinian City, 1730–1831. Columbia University Press. ISBN 978-0-231-50603-8.

Preceded by Muhammad Pasha al-Azm	Wali of Sidon; 1770-1771	Succeeded by Recep Pasha
Preceded by Muhammad Pasha al-Kurji	Wali of Damascus; 1783-1784	Succeeded by Ahmad Pasha al-Jazzar
