= Khan al-Umdan =

Caravanserai in Acre, Israel

Coordinates: 32°55′11.73″N 35°4′8.57″E

- خان العمدان
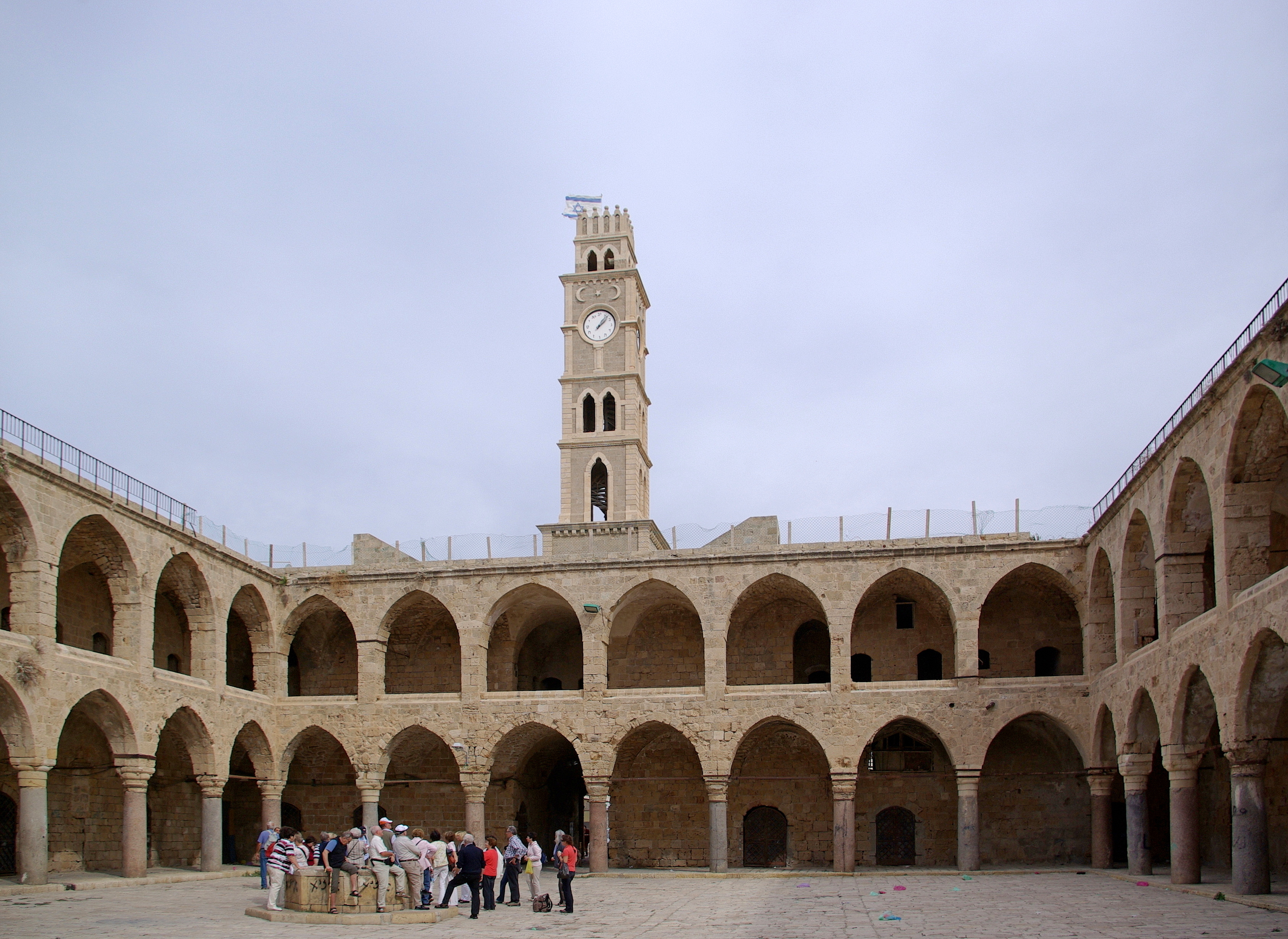
- Interactive map of the Khan al-Umdan area
- Alternative names: Hebrew: ח'אן אל עומדאן; Baháʼí name: Khán-i-'Avámid

General information
- Type: Caravanserai
- Architectural style: Ottoman
- Location: Acre, Israel
- Completed: 1784

Technical details
- Floor count: 2

References
- archnet.org

Khan al-Umdan (Arabic: خان العمدان: "Caravanserai of the Pillars" or "Inn of the Columns", also known as Khán-i-ʻAvámid) is the largest and best preserved caravanserai in Acre, Israel. Located in the Old City of Acre, it is one of the prominent projects constructed during the rule of Ahmed Jezzar Pasha in Galilee, under the Ottoman era.

== History ==
=== Ottoman period ===
Being one of four Khans in Acre, Khan al-Umdan was built in 1784 on the place of the Royal Customs house of the Kingdom of Jerusalem. Due to its plethora of columns the khan was named Khan al-Umdan which means "Inn of the Columns" or "Caravanserai of Pillars". It incorporates forty columns made of granite that were taken from Caesarea, Atlit and the ruins of Crusader monuments in Acre itself.

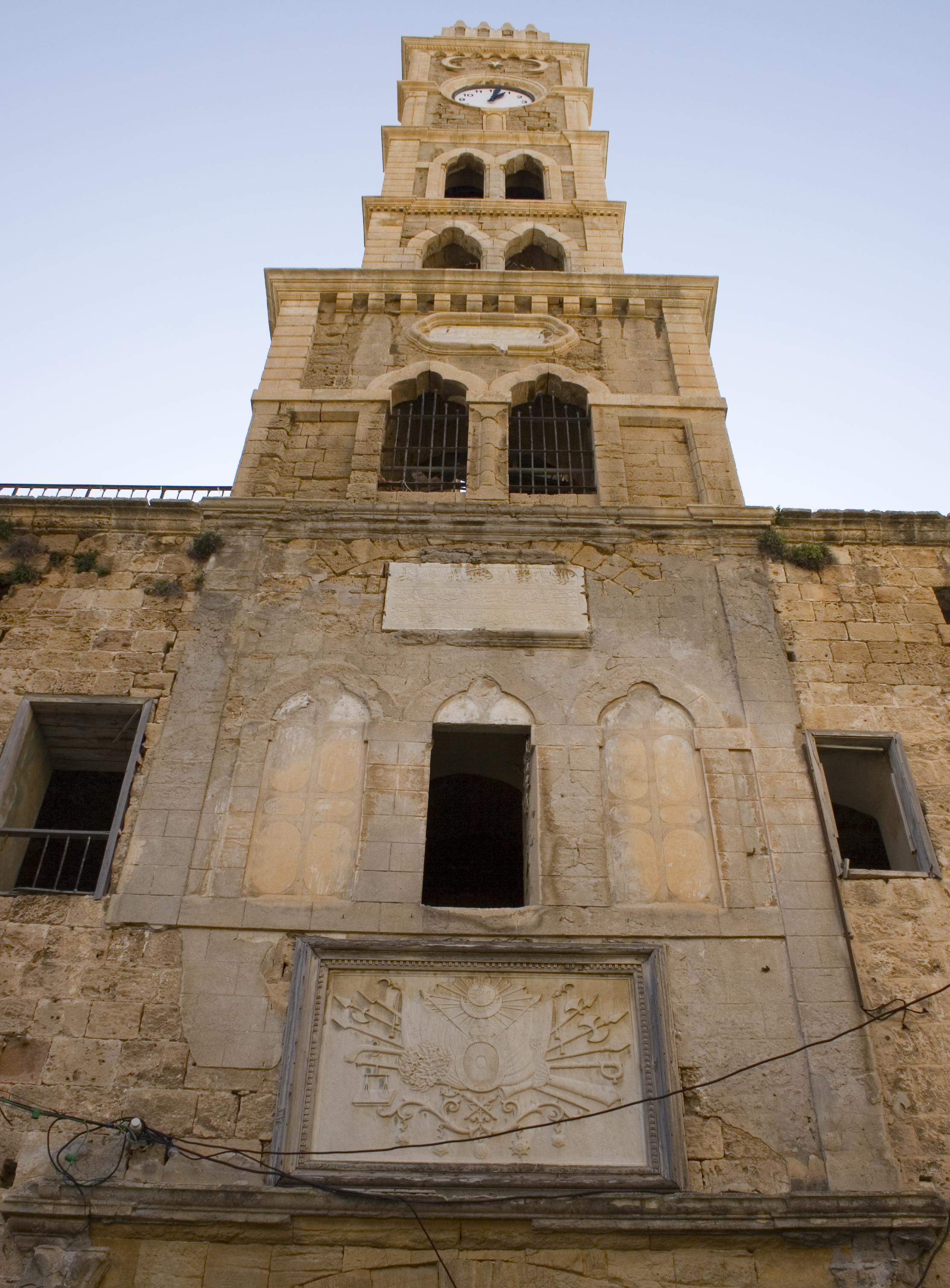
The clock tower of Khan al-Umdan

Due to its proximity to the port, Khan al-Umdan has throughout its history been an important trading spot. Merchants arriving at Acre used the khan as a warehouse while the second floor functioned as a hostel. Camel caravans once brought produce and grain from Galilean villages to the city's markets and port.

The khan later gained importance to the Baháʼí Faith (as the Khán-i-'Avámid) as it was the site where Baha'ullah used to receive guests, and later the site for a Baháʼí school.

In 1906 a clock tower was added adjacent to the main entrance to the khan to commemorate the silver jubilee of the rule of Ottoman sultan Abd al-Hamid II. It is similar to the Jaffa Clock Tower, a building dedicated to the same purpose, along with five more towers in Ottoman Palestine (in Jerusalem, Haifa, Safed, Nablus, and possibly Nazareth) and over a hundred across the entire empire.

=== Modern era ===
In 2001 Khan al-Umdan, together with the rest of Acre's old city, was designated as a World Heritage Site. In 2004 Khan al-Umdan (Hebrew: ח'אן אל עומדאן) was featured on a stamp of Israel worth 1.3 sheqels. Nowadays, the khan is a major tourist attraction open all hours of the day and used as an open-air stage during festivals in the city, such as the theater festival of Acre during the month of October.

== Bibliography ==
- Dumper, Michael; Stanley, Bruce E. (2006). Cities of the Middle East and North Africa: a historical encyclopedia (Illustrated ed.). ABC-CLIO. ISBN 9781576079195.
- Vilnay, Zev (1963). The Holy Land in old prints and maps (2nd ed.). R. Mass.
