= Fatnica =

Fatnica Фатница
- Village
- Location within Bosnia and Herzegovina
- Coordinates: 43°02′N 18°19′E
- Country: Bosnia and Herzegovina
- Entity: Republika Srpska
- Municipality: Bileća
- Time zone: UTC+1 (CET)
  - Summer (DST): UTC+2 (CEST)

Fatnica (Serbian Cyrillic: Фатница) is a village in the municipality of Bileća, Republika Srpska, Bosnia and Herzegovina.

Safvet-beg Bašagić claims that the Ottoman governor Jazzar Pasha (born as Ahmed Pervan) hails from the Pervan family from Fatnica.

== Demographics ==
Ethnic Composition
| | 2013 | 1991 | 1981 | 1971 | 1961 |
| Total | 79 | 155 | 270 | 285 | 341 |
| Serbs | 77 (97,5%) | 111 (71,6%) | 164 (60,7%) | 153 (54%) | 211 (61,8%) |
| Bosniaks | 2 (2,5%) | 44 (28,4%) | 94 (34,8%) | 131 (46%) | 120 (35,2%) |
| Yugoslavs | | 0 | 10 (3,7%) | 0 | 9 (2,6%) |
