= Turkish Cypriots =

Ethnic group in Cyprus

Kıbrıslı Türkler

Total population
- Total unknown (see also Turkish Cypriot diaspora)

Regions with significant populations
- Northern Cyprus: est. 150,000
- Turkey: 300,000 to over 650,000 (Higher estimate includes descendants of the early twentieth century muhacirs)
- United Kingdom: 130,000 (TRNC nationals only – excludes British born and dual heritage children); 300,000 to 400,000 (including descendants)
- Australia: 30,000 (Turkish Cypriot immigrants in 1993) est.40,000 to 120,000
- Canada: 6,000 (Turkish Cypriot immigrants in 1993)
- United States: 6,000 (Turkish Cypriot immigrants in 1993)
- Cyprus (south): 1,128 (2011 Cyprus census) est.2,000
- Other countries: 5,000 (2001 TRNC Ministry of Foreign Affairs estimate), particularly in Western Europe, New Zealand, South Africa

Languages
- Turkish language (Cypriot Turkish · Istanbul Turkish)

Religion
- Sunni Islam (about 70%) and irreligion (about 30%)
- ^{a} This figure does not include Turkish settlers from Turkey.

Turkish Cypriots or Cypriot Turks (Turkish: Kıbrıs Türkleri or Kıbrıslı Türkler; Greek: Τουρκοκύπριοι, romanized: Tourkokýprioi) are ethnic Turks originating from Cyprus. Following the Ottoman conquest of the island in 1571, about 30,000 Turkish settlers were given land once they arrived in Cyprus. Additionally, many of the island's local Christians converted to Islam during the early years of Ottoman rule. Nonetheless, the influx of mainly Muslim settlers to Cyprus continued intermittently until the end of the Ottoman period. Today, while Northern Cyprus is home to a significant part of the Turkish Cypriot population, the majority of Turkish Cypriots live abroad, forming the Turkish Cypriot diaspora. This diaspora came into existence after the Ottoman Empire transferred the control of the island to the British Empire, as many Turkish Cypriots emigrated primarily to Turkey and the United Kingdom for political and economic reasons.

Standard Turkish is the official language of Northern Cyprus. The vernacular spoken by Turkish Cypriots is Cypriot Turkish, which has been influenced by Cypriot Greek, as well as English.

== History ==
=== Pre-Ottoman Cyprus ===
Although there was no settled Muslim population in Cyprus prior to the Ottoman conquest of 1570–71, some Ottoman Turks were captured and carried off as prisoners to Cyprus in the year 1400 during Cypriot raids in the Asiatic and Egyptian coasts. Some of these captives accepted or were forced to convert to Christianity and were baptized; however, there were also some Turkish slaves who remained unbaptized. By 1425, some of these slaves helped the Mamluke army to gain access to Limassol Castle. Despite the release of some of the captives, after the payment of ransoms, most of the baptized Turks continued to remain on the island. The medieval Cypriot historian Leontios Machairas recalled that the baptized Turks were not permitted to leave Nicosia when the Mamlukes approached the city after the battle of Khirokitia in 1426. According to Professor Charles Fraser Beckingham, "there must therefore have been some Cypriots, at least nominally Christian, who were of Turkish, Arab, or Egyptian origin."

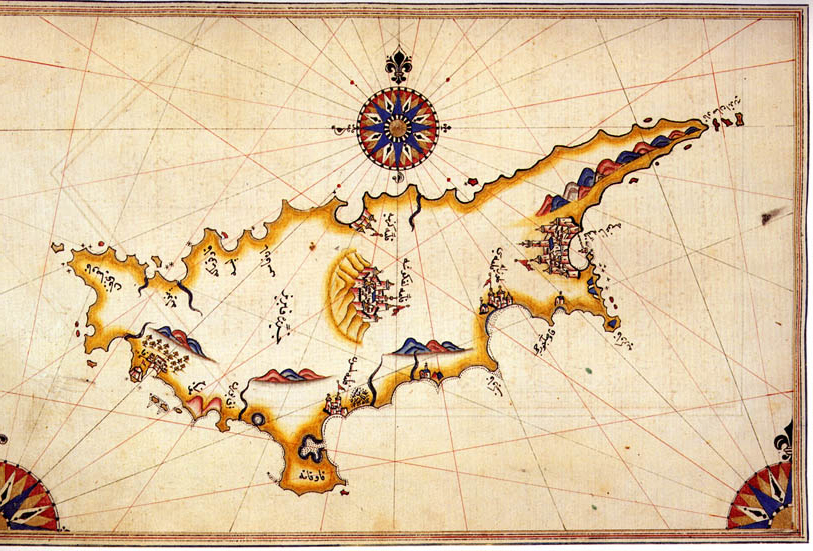
An early sixteenth century (c. 1521–1525) map of Cyprus by the Ottoman cartographer Piri Reis

By 1488, the Ottomans made their first attempt at conquering Cyprus when Sultan Bayezid II sent a fleet to conquer Famagusta. However, the attempt failed due to the timely intervention of a Venetian fleet. The Queen of Cyprus, Caterina Cornaro, was forced to relinquish her crown to the Republic of Venice in 1489. In the same year, Ottoman ships were seen off the coast of Karpas and the Venetians began to strengthen the fortifications of the island. By 1500, coastal raids by Ottoman vessels resulted in the heavy loss of Venetian fleets, forcing Venice to negotiate a peace treaty with the Ottoman Empire in 1503. However, by May 1539 Suleiman I decided to attack Limassol because the Venetians had been sheltering pirates who continuously attacked Ottoman ships. Limassol stayed under Ottoman control until a peace treaty was signed in 1540. Cyprus continued to be a haven for pirates who interrupted the safe passage of Ottoman trade ships and Muslim pilgrims sailing to Mecca and Medina. By 1569, pirates captured the Ottoman defterdar (treasurer) of Egypt, and Selim II decided to safeguard the sea route from Constantinople to Alexandria by conquering the island and clearing the eastern Mediterranean of all enemies in 1570–71.

=== Ottoman Cyprus ===
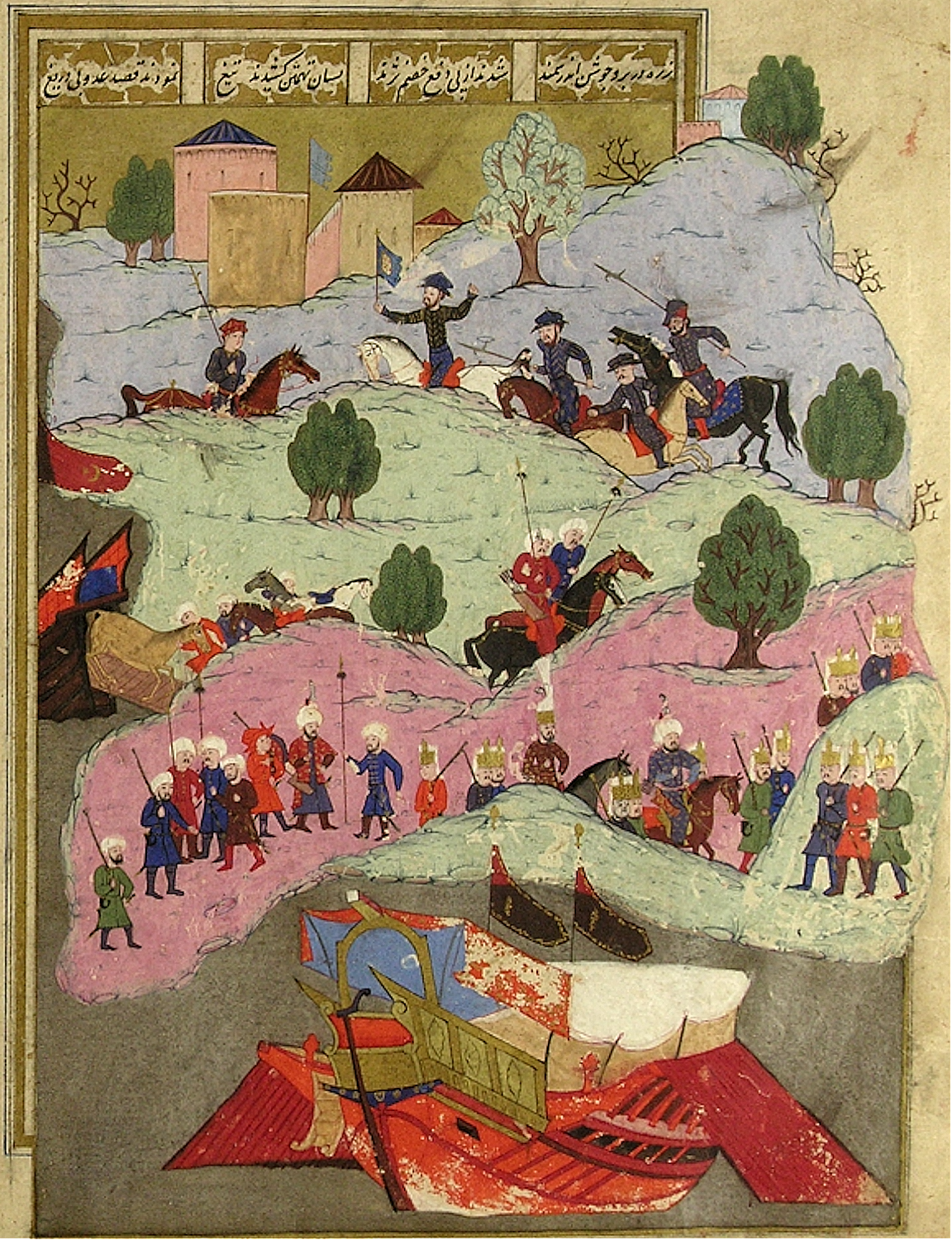
A miniature painting depicting the landing of Ottoman soldiers at Limassol Castle during the Ottoman conquest of Cyprus (1570–71)

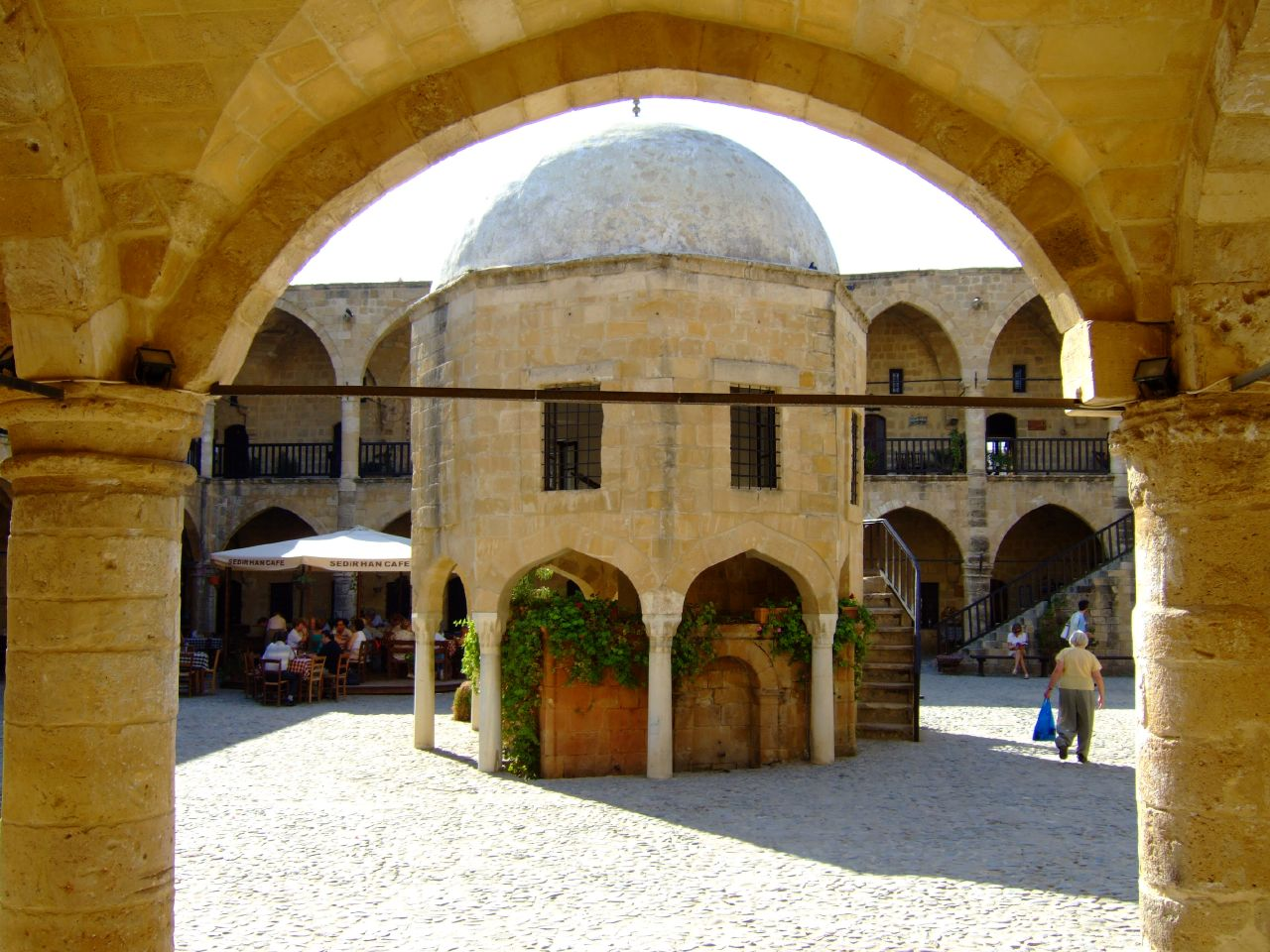
The Ottoman Turks built Büyük Han in 1572. Today it has become a thriving center of Turkish Cypriot culture.

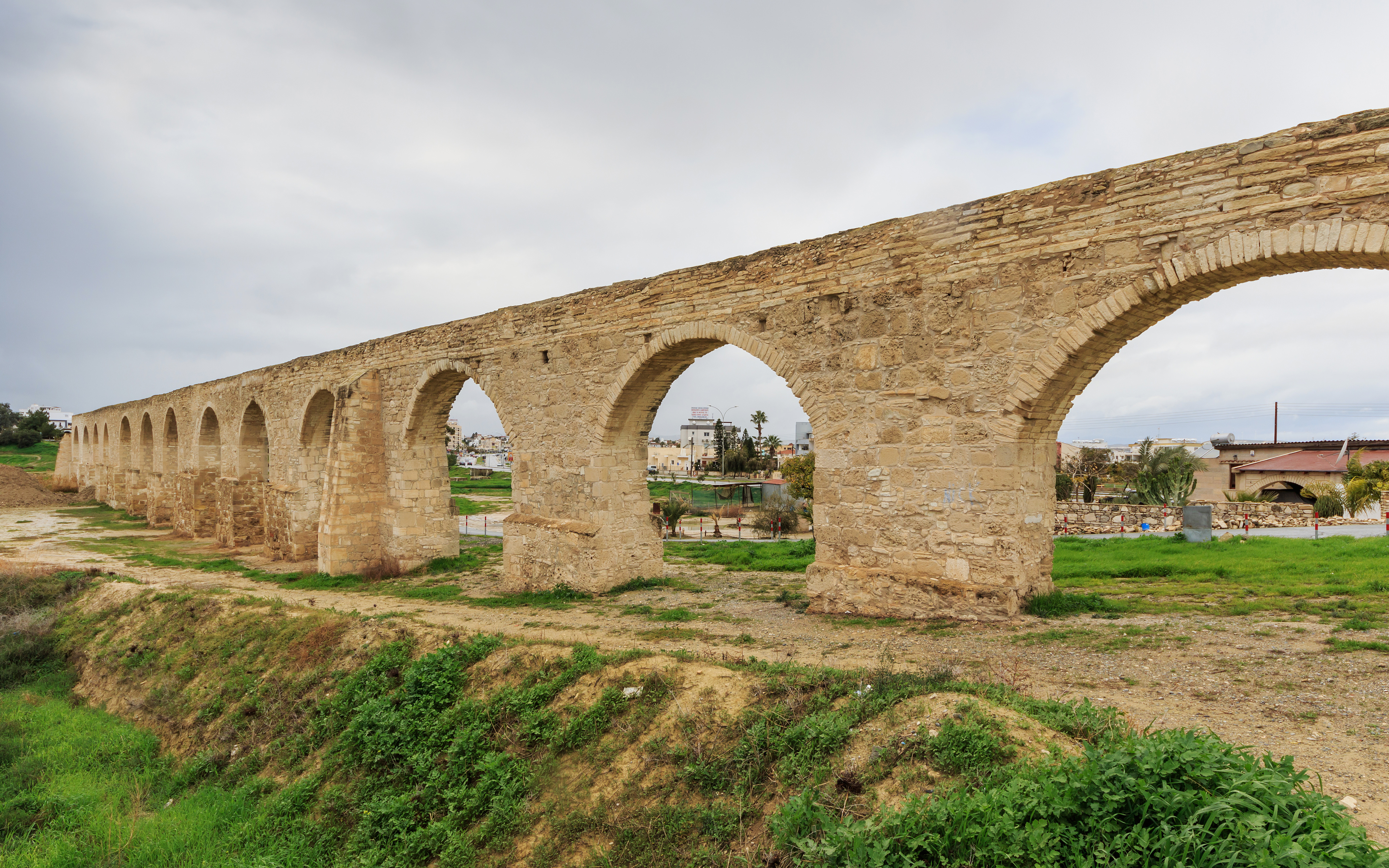
The Bekir Pasha Aqueduct was built by the Ottoman governor Ebubekir Pasha in 1747. It is considered to be the most prominent water supply ever built in Cyprus.

The basis for the emergence of a sizeable and enduring Turkish community in Cyprus emerged when Ottoman troops landed on the island in mid-May 1570 and seized it within a year from Venetian rule. The post-conquest period established a significant Muslim community which consisted of soldiers from the campaign who remained behind and further settlers who were brought from Anatolia as part of a traditional Ottoman population policy. There were also new converts to Islam on the island during the early years of Ottoman rule.

In addition to documented settlement of Anatolian peasants and craftsmen, as well as the arrival of soldiers, decrees were also issued banishing Anatolian tribes, "undesirable" persons, and members of various "troublesome" Muslim sects, principally those officially classified as heretical. This influx of mainly Muslim settlers to Cyprus continued intermittently until the end of the Ottoman period.

Some Turkish Cypriots are descendants of Crypto-Christians, a phenomenon that was not uncommon in the Ottoman Empire given its multi-faith character. In Cyprus, many Latins and Maronites, as well as Greeks, converted to Islam at different points during Ottoman rule for a number of reasons ranging from collectively avoiding heavy taxation to ending an individual woman unhappy marriage. Their artificial embrace of Islam and their secret maintaining of Christianity led this group of crypto-Christians to be known in Greek as Linobambaki or the cotton-linen sect as they changed religion to curry favour with Ottoman officials during the day but practiced Catholicism at night. In 1636 the conditions for the Christians became intolerable and certain Christians decided to become Muslims. According to Palmieri (1905) the Maronites who became Muslims lived mainly in the Nicosia District and despite the fact that the Maronites turned to Muslims they never gave up their Christian faith and beliefs hoping to become Christians. This is why they baptized their children according to the Christian faith, but they also practiced circumcision. They also gave their children two names, a Muslim and a Christian one. Many of the villages and neighbouring areas accepted as Turkish Cypriot estates, were formerly Linobambaki activity centers. These include:

- Agios Andronikos (Yeşilköy)
- Agios Ioannis (Ayyanni)
- Agios Sozomenos (Arpalık)
- Agios Theodoros (Boğaziçi)
- Armenochori (Esenköy)
- Ayios Iakovos (Altınova)
- Ayios Khariton (Ergenekon)
- Dali (Dali)
- Frodisia (Yağmuralan)
- Galinoporni (Kaleburnu)
- Kato Arodes (Aşağı Kalkanlı)
- Tylliria (Dillirga)
- Kornokipos (Görneç)
- Kritou Marottou (Grit-Marut)
- Limnitis (Yeşilırmak)
- Louroujina (Akincilar)
- Melounta (Mallıdağ)
- Platani (Çınarlı)
- Potamia (Bodamya)
- Vretsia (Vretça)

By the second quarter of the nineteenth century, approximately 30,000 Muslims were living in Cyprus, comprising about 35% of the total population. The fact that Turkish was the main language spoken by the Muslims of the island is a significant indicator that the majority of them were either Turkish-speaking Anatolians or otherwise from a Turkic background. Throughout the Ottoman rule, the demographic ratio between Christian "Greeks" and Muslim "Turks" fluctuated constantly. During 1745–1814, the Muslim Turkish Cypriots constituted the majority on the island compared to the Christian Greek Cypriots, being up to 75% of the total island population. (Note: Drummond, 1745: 150,000 vs. 50,000; Kyprianos, 1777: 47,000 vs. 37,000; De Vezin, 1788–1792: 60,000 vs. 20,000; Kinneir 1814: 35,000 vs. 35,000).) However, by 1841, Turks made up 27% of the island's population. One of the reasons for this decline is because the Turkish community were obliged to serve in the Ottoman army for years, usually away from home, very often losing their lives in the endless wars of the Ottoman Empire. Another reason for the declining population was because of the emigration trend of some 15,000 Turkish Cypriots to Anatolia in 1878, when the Ottoman Turks handed over the administration of the island to Britain.

=== British Cyprus ===
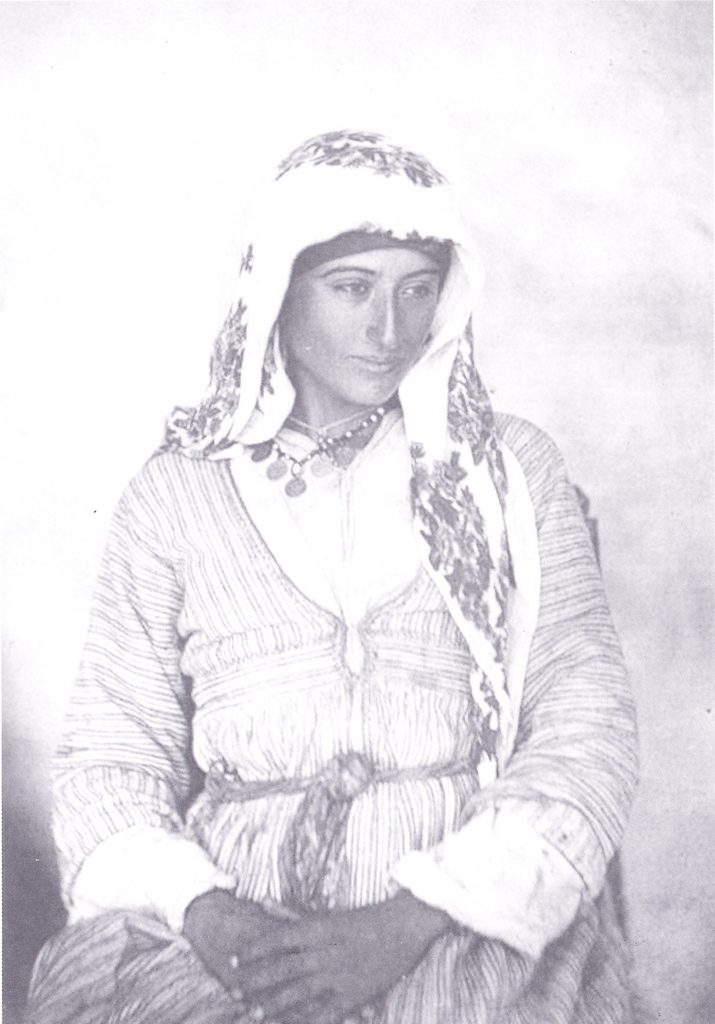
A Cypriot woman in traditional Turkish fashion, 1878

By 1878, during the Congress of Berlin, under the terms of the Anglo-Ottoman Cyprus Convention, the Ottoman Turks had agreed to assign Cyprus to Britain to occupy and rule, though not to possess as sovereign territory. According to the first British census of Cyprus, in 1881, 95% of the island's Muslims spoke Turkish as their mother tongue. As of the 1920s, the percentage of Greek-speaking Muslims had dropped from 5%, in 1881, to just under 2% of the total Muslim population. During the opening years of the twentieth century Ottomanism became an ever more popular identity held by the Cypriot Muslim intelligentsia, especially in the wake of the Young Turk Revolution of 1908. Increasing numbers of Young Turks who had turned against Sultan Abdul Hamid II sought refuge in Cyprus. A rising class of disgruntled intellectuals in the island's main urban centres gradually began to warm to the ideas of positivism, freedom and modernization. Spurred on by the rising calls for "enosis", the union with Greece, emanating from Greek Cypriots, an initially hesitant "Turkism" was also starting to appear in certain newspaper articles and to be heard in the political debates of the local intelligentsia of Cyprus. In line with the changes introduced in the Ottoman Empire after 1908, the curricula of Cyprus's Muslim schools, such as the "Idadi", were also altered to incorporate more secular teachings with increasingly Turkish nationalist undertones. Many of these graduates in due course ended up as teachers in the growing number of urban and rural schools that had begun to proliferate across the island by the 1920s.

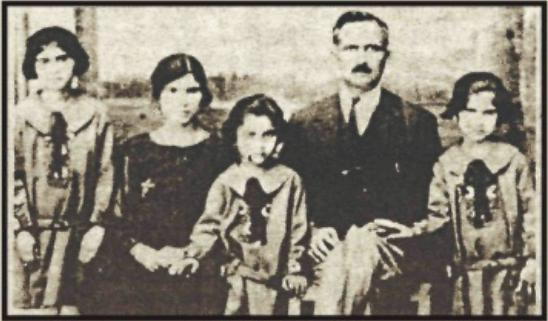
Mehmet Remzi Okan with his wife and children in 1919 during the Turkish War of Independence. The family were Turkish Cypriots who owned the newspaper Söz Gazetesi.

In 1914, the Ottoman Empire joined the First World War against the Allied Forces and Britain annexed the island. Cyprus's Muslim inhabitants were officially asked to choose between adopting either British nationality or retaining their Ottoman subject status; about 4,000–8,500 Muslims decided to leave the island and move to Turkey. Following its defeat in World War I, the Ottoman Empire were faced with the Greco-Turkish War (1919–1922) whereby the Greek incursion into Anatolia aimed at claiming what Greece believed to be historically Greek territory. For the Ottoman Turks of Cyprus, already fearing the aims of enosis-seeking Greek Cypriots, reports of atrocities committed by the Greeks against the Turkish populations in Anatolia, and the Greek Occupation of Smyrna, produced further fears for their own future. Greek forces were routed in 1922 under the leadership of Mustafa Kemal Atatürk who, in 1923, proclaimed the new Republic of Turkey and renounced irredentist claims to former Ottoman territories beyond the Anatolian heartland. Muslims in Cyprus were thus excluded from the nation-building project, though many still heeded Atatürk's call to join in the establishment of the new nation-state, and opted for Turkish citizenship. Between 1881 and 1927 approximately 30,000 Turkish Cypriots emigrated to Turkey.

The 1920s was to prove a critical decade in terms of stricter ethno-religious compartments; hence, Muslim Cypriots who remained on the island gradually embraced the ideology of Turkish nationalism due to the impact of the Kemalist Revolution. At its core were the Kemalist values of secularism, modernization and westernization; reforms such as the introduction of the new Turkish alphabet, adoption of western dress and secularization, were adopted voluntarily by Muslim Turkish Cypriots, who had been prepared for such changes not just by the Tanzimat but also by several decades of British rule. Many of those Cypriots who until then had still identified themselves primarily as Muslims began now to see themselves principally as Turks in Cyprus.

By 1950, a Cypriot Enosis referendum in which 95.7% of Greek Cypriot voters supported a fight aimed at enosis, the union of Cyprus with Greece were led by an armed organisation, in 1955, called EOKA by Georgios Grivas which aimed at bringing down British rule and uniting the island of Cyprus with Greece. Turkish Cypriots had always reacted immediately against the objective of enosis; thus, the 1950s saw many Turkish Cypriots who were forced to flee from their homes. In 1958, Turkish Cypriots set up their own armed group called Turkish Resistance Organisation (TMT) and by early 1958, the first wave of armed conflict between the two communities began; a few hundred Turkish Cypriots left their villages and quarters in the mixed towns and never returned.

=== Republic of Cyprus ===
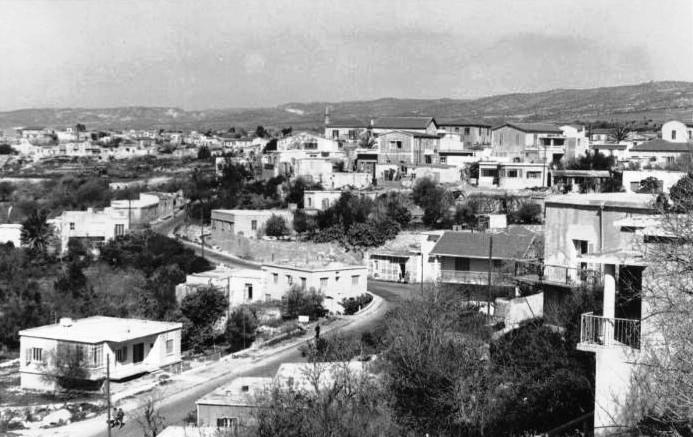
An old Turkish Cypriot "mahalle" (quarter) in Paphos (1969)

By 16 August 1960, the island of Cyprus became an independent state, the Republic of Cyprus, with power sharing between the two communities under the 1960 Zurich agreements, with Britain, Greece and Turkey as Guarantor Powers. Archbishop Makarios III was elected as president by the Greek Cypriots and Dr. Fazıl Küçük was elected as vice-president by the Turkish Cypriots. However, in December 1963, in the events known as "Bloody Christmas", when Makarios III attempted to modify the Constitution, Greek Cypriots initiated a military campaign against the Turkish Cypriots and began to attack Turkish inhabited villages; by early 1964, the Turkish Cypriots started to withdraw into armed enclaves where the Greek Cypriots blockaded them, resulting in some 25,000 Turkish Cypriots becoming refugees, or internally "displaced persons". This resulted in the UN peacekeeping force, UNFICYP, being stationed on the island as well as an external migration trend of thousands more Turkish Cypriots to the United Kingdom, Turkey, North America and Australia. With the rise to power of the Greek military junta, a decade later, in 1974, a group of right-wing Greek nationalists, EOKA B, who supported the union of Cyprus with Greece, launched a putsch. This action precipitated the Turkish invasion of Cyprus, which led to the capture of the present-day territory of Northern Cyprus the following month, after a ceasefire collapsed. The Turkish invasion resulted in the occupation of some 37% of the island in the north. During the invasion of the island, a number of atrocities against the Turkish Cypriot community were committed; such as the Maratha, Santalaris and Aloda massacre by the Greek Cypriot paramilitary organisation EOKA B. After the Turkish invasion and the ensuing 1975 Vienna agreements, 60,000 Turkish Cypriots who lived in the south of the island fled to the north. The 1974–1975 movement was strictly organised by the Provisional Turkish Administration who tried to preserve village communities intact.

=== Turkish Republic of Northern Cyprus ===
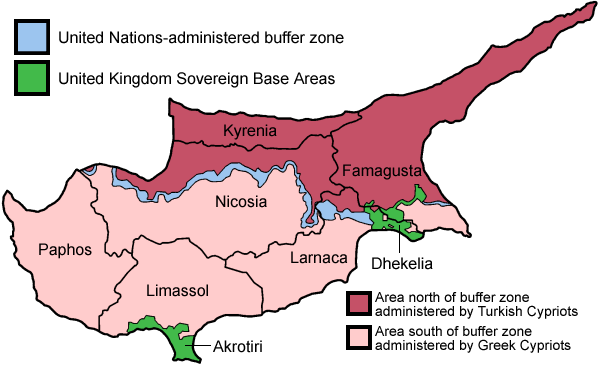
The northern areas of the island of Cyprus administered by Turkish Cypriots

In 1983, the Turkish Cypriots declared their own state in the north, the Turkish Republic of Northern Cyprus, which remains internationally unrecognised, except by Turkey. In 2004, a referendum for the unification of the island, the "Annan Plan", was accepted by 65% of Turkish Cypriots but rejected by 76% of Greek Cypriots. The majority of Turks born after 1975 in Northern Cyprus are the mixed descendants of native Turkish Cypriots and mainland Turkish settlers.

== Culture ==
The Turkish Cypriots are Turkish-speaking, regard themselves as secular Muslims, and take pride in their Ottoman heritage. However, Turkish Cypriots differentiate themselves from mainlanders, especially from the religiously conservative settlers who have come to Cyprus more recently, but their strong connection to Turkey is nonetheless undisputed. Hence, the Turkish Cypriot identity is based on their ethnic Turkish roots and links to mainland Turkey, but also to their Cypriot character with cultural and linguistic similarities with Greek Cypriots. Their culture is heavily based on family ties linked to parents, siblings, and relatives; one's neighbourhood is also considered important as emphasis is given on helping those in need. Thus, much of their lives revolves around social activities, and food is a central feature of gatherings. Turkish Cypriot folk dances, music, and art are also integral parts of their culture.

=== Religion ===
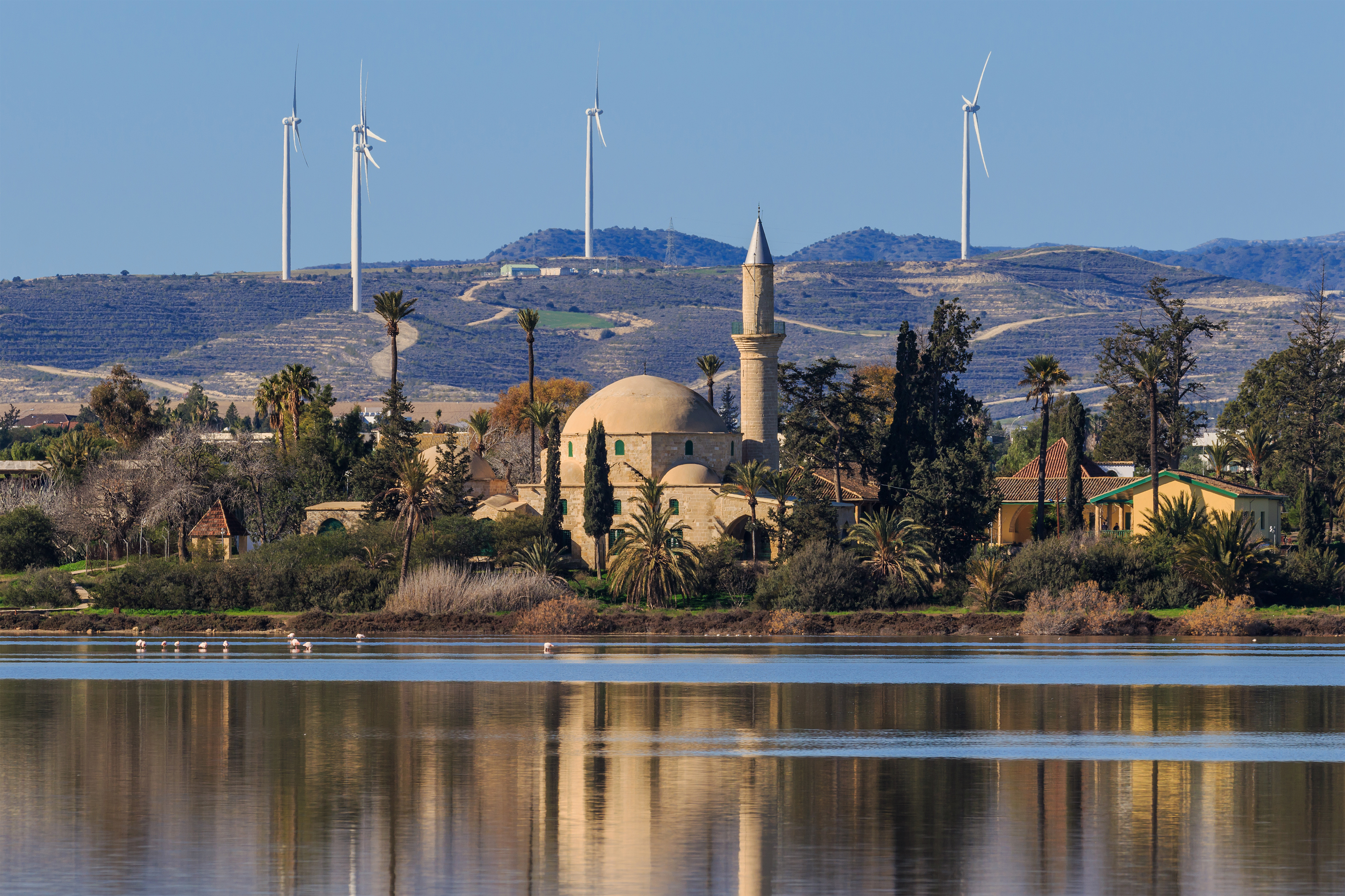
The Hala Sultan Tekke was built by the Ottomans in the 18th century.

According to a 2020 survey, the majority of Turkish Cypriots – about 70% – are religious, with most of those – about 98.7% – identifying as Sunni Muslims; about 30% of the total population does not identify with any religion. Religious practices are considered a matter of individual choice and many do not actively practice their religion. Alcohol is frequently consumed within the community and most Turkish Cypriot women do not cover their heads. Turkish Cypriot males are generally circumcised at a young age in accordance with religious beliefs, although, this practice appears more related to custom and tradition than to powerful religious motivation.

The social/religious phenomenon of crypto-Christianity was observed in Cyprus, as in other parts of the Ottoman Empire. The crypto-Christians of Cyprus were known as Linobambaki (= of linen and cotton). They are mentioned by foreign travellers as Turks who are secretly Greeks, observing the Greek Orthodox fasting (Turner 1815), drinking wine, eating pork and often taking Christian wives.

=== Language ===
The Turkish language was introduced to Cyprus with the Ottoman conquest in 1571 and became the politically dominant, prestigious language, of the administration. In the post-Ottoman period, Cypriot Turkish was relatively isolated from standard Turkish and had strong influences by the Cypriot Greek dialect. The condition of coexistence with the Greek Cypriots led to a certain bilingualism whereby Turkish Cypriots' knowledge of Greek was important in areas where the two communities lived and worked together.

According to Prof. C. F. Beckingham (1957), in Cyprus religious and linguistic divisions do not always coincide. There were "Turkish", i.e. Muslim villages in which the normal language was Greek. Among them were Lapithiou, Platanisto, Ayios Simeon Beckingham said that this phenomenon has not been adequately investigated. The existence of Greek-speaking Muslims is also mentioned in subsequent works. Ozan Gülle (2014), "it is historically well documented that Turkish Cypriots showed large differences in their frequency of communication in Cypriot Greek [...]: On one end of the spectrum are Turkish Cypriots who were probably monolingual Cypriot Greek speakers or had only little competency in Turkish, ...".

The linguistic situation changed radically in 1974, following the division of Cyprus into a Greek south and a Turkish north. Today, the Cypriot Turkish dialect is being exposed to increasing standard Turkish through immigration from Turkey, new mass media, and new educational institutions. Nonetheless, a Turkish speaker familiar with the Cypriot Turkish variety of Turkish can still easily identify a member of the community from one who is not. Although many Turkish Cypriots command standard Turkish as well, they generally choose to use their own variety in particular contexts to affirm their identity. Most commonly, these differences are in pronunciation, but they extend to lexicon and grammatical structures as well. There are many words used by Turkish Cypriots that originate in the particular historical circumstances of the island, including English and Greek, and therefore have no precedent in standard Turkish. There are also words used by the Turkish Cypriot and Greek Cypriot communities which are authentically Cypriot in origin.

=== Music and dances ===
Kıbrısım

Güzelim

Folk music and dancing is an integral part of social life among Turkish Cypriots. Traditional Turkish Cypriot folk dances can be divided into five categories: Karsilamas, Sirtos, Zeybeks, Ciftetellis/Arabiyes, and Topical Dances (such as Orak, Kozan, Kartal and Topal). The folk dancing groups usually have performances during national festivals, weddings, Turkish nights at hotels and within tourism areas.

== Demographics ==
=== Debates on the Turkish Cypriot population in the 1970s ===
The 1960 census of Cyprus reported the Turkish Cypriot population as 18% of the total population. The figure was challenged during a 1978 debate in the British Parliament when Lord Spens stated that there were 400,000 Turkish Cypriots in Cyprus, at least one-fifth of the population.

=== 2006 Census ===
According to the 2006 Northern Cyprus Census, there were 145,443 Turkish Cypriots born on the island who were resident in Northern Cyprus (TRNC). Of the Cypriot-born population, 120,007 had both parents born in Cyprus; 12,628 had one of their parents born in Cyprus and the other born in another country. Thus, 132,635 Turkish Cypriots had at least one parent born in Cyprus.

| Place of birth | Turkish Cypriot population | Male | Female |
|---|---|---|---|
| North Cyprus | 112,534 | 56,332 | 56,202 |
| Lefkoşa | 54,077 | 27,043 | 27,034 |
| Gazimağusa | 32,264 | 16,151 | 16,113 |
| Girne | 10,178 | 5,168 | 5,010 |
| Güzelyurt | 10,241 | 5,013 | 5,228 |
| İskele | 4,617 | 2,356 | 2,261 |
| District not indicated | 1,157 | 601 | 556 |
| South Cyprus | 32,538 | 15,411 | 17,127 |
| Nicosia (Lefkoşa) | 3,544 | 1,646 | 1,898 |
| Famagusta (Gazimağusa) | 1,307 | 598 | 709 |
| Larnaca (Larnaka) | 6,492 | 3,031 | 3,461 |
| Limassol (Limasol) | 9,067 | 4,314 | 4,753 |
| Paphos (Baf) | 11,955 | 5,750 | 6,205 |
| District not indicated | 173 | 72 | 101 |
| Cyprus – North or South region not indicated | 371 | 178 | 193 |
| Total | 145,443 | 71,921 | 73,522 |

=== 2011 Census ===
According to the 2011 Northern Cyprus Census, there were 160,207 Turkish Cypriots born on the island who were resident in North Cyprus (TRNC).

| Place of birth | Turkish Cypriot population | Male | Female |
|---|---|---|---|
| North Cyprus | 131,423 | 65,880 | 65,543 |
| Lefkoşa | 66,833 | 33,306 | 33,527 |
| Gazimağusa | 37,027 | 18,634 | 18,393 |
| Girne | 12,719 | 6,477 | 6,242 |
| Güzelyurt | 10,457 | 5,158 | 5,299 |
| İskele | 4,387 | 2,305 | 2,082 |
| South Cyprus | 28,784 | 13,615 | 15,169 |
| Nicosia (Lefkoşa) | 2,958 | 1,412 | 1,546 |
| Famagusta (Gazimağusa) | 237 | 104 | 133 |
| Larnaca (Larnaka) | 5,872 | 2,760 | 3,112 |
| Limassol (Limasol) | 8,579 | 4,031 | 4,548 |
| Paphos (Baf) | 11,138 | 5,308 | 5,830 |
| Total | 160,207 | 79,495 | 80,712 |

== Diaspora ==
There was significant Turkish Cypriot emigration from the island during the nineteenth and twentieth centuries, mainly to Great Britain, Australia, and Turkey. Emigration from Cyprus has mainly been for economical and political reasons. According to the TRNC Ministry of Foreign Affairs, in 2001, 500,000 Turkish Cypriots were living in Turkey; 200,000 in Great Britain; 40,000 in Australia; some 10,000 in North America; and 5,000 in other countries.

A more recent estimate, in 2011, by the Home Affairs Committee states that there are now 300,000 Turkish Cypriots living in the United Kingdom though Turkish Cypriots themselves claim that the British-Turkish Cypriot community has reached 400,000. Furthermore, recent estimates suggest that there are between 60,000 and 120,000 Turkish Cypriots living in Australia, 5,000 in the United States, 2,000 in Germany, 1,800 in Canada, 1,600 in New Zealand, and a smaller community in South Africa.

=== Turkey ===
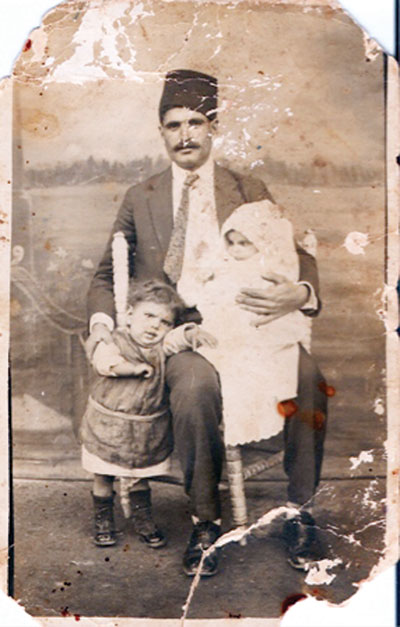
A Turkish Cypriot family who migrated to Turkey in 1935

The first mass migration of Turkish Cypriots to Turkey occurred in 1878 when the Ottoman Empire leased Cyprus to Great Britain. The flow of Turkish Cypriot emigration to Turkey continued in the aftermath of the First World War, and gained its greatest velocity in the mid-1920s. Economic motives played an important part of the continued migration to Turkey because conditions for the poor in Cyprus during the 1920s were especially harsh. Thereafter, Turkish Cypriots continued to migrate to Turkey during the Second World War in the 1940s and during the Cyprus conflict of the 1960s and 1970s.

Initially, enthusiasm to emigrate to Turkey was inflated by the euphoria that greeted the birth of the newly established Republic of Turkey and later of promises of assistance to Turks who emigrated. A decision taken by the Turkish Government at the end of 1925, for instance, noted that the Turks of Cyprus had, according to the Treaty of Lausanne, the right to emigrate to the republic, and therefore, families that so emigrated would be given a house and sufficient land. The precise number of those who emigrated to Turkey is a matter that remains unknown. The press in Turkey reported in mid-1927 that of those who had opted for Turkish nationality, 5,000–6,000 Turkish Cypriots had already settled in Turkey. However, many Turkish Cypriots had already emigrated even before the rights accorded to them under the Treaty of Lausanne had come into force.

Metin Heper and Bilge Criss have summarized the migration of the late nineteenth and early twentieth century as follows:

The first wave of immigration from Cyprus occurred in 1878 when the Ottomans were obliged to lease the island to Great Britain; at that time, 15,000 people moved to Anatolia. When the 1923 Lausanne Treaty gave the island to Great Britain another 30,000 immigrants came to Turkey.

St. John-Jones has analyzed the migration of Turkish Cypriots during early British rule further:

"[I]f the Turkish-Cypriot community had, like the Greek-Cypriots, increased by 101 percent between 1881 and 1931, it would have totalled 91,300 in 1931 – 27,000 more than the number enumerated. Is it possible that so many Turkish-Cypriots emigrated in the fifty-year period? Taken together, the considerations just mentioned suggest that it probably was. From a base of 45,000 in 1881, emigration of anything like 27,000 persons seems huge, but after subtracting the known 5,000 of the 1920s, the balance represents an average annual outflow of some 500 – not enough, probably, to concern the community's leaders, evoke official comment, or be documented in any way which survives today".

The Turkish Cypriot population in Turkey continued to increase at fluctuating speeds as a result of the Second World War (1939–1945). According to Ali Suat Bilge, taking into consideration the mass migrations of 1878, the First World War, the 1920s early Turkish Republican era, and the Second World War, overall, a total of approximately 100,000 Turkish Cypriots had left the island for Turkey between 1878 and 1945. By 31 August 1955, a statement by Turkey's Minister of State and acting foreign minister, Fatin Rüştü Zorlu, at the London Conference on Cyprus, estimated that the total Turkish Cypriot population (including descendants) in Turkey had reached 300,000:

Consequently, today [1955] as well, when we take into account the state of the population in Cyprus, it is not sufficient to say, for instance, that 100,000 Turks live there. One should rather say that 100,000 live there and that 300,000 Turkish Cypriots live in various parts of Turkey.

By 2001 the TRNC Ministry of Foreign Affairs estimated that 500,000 Turkish Cypriots were living in Turkey.

=== Palestine ===
Turkish Cypriots who remained in Cyprus during the early twentieth century were faced with the harsh economic conditions of the Great Depression under British rule. Consequently, many families in the poorest villages, facing debt and starvation, married off their daughters to Arabs mainly in British Palestine, and other Arab countries, in the hope that they would have a better life. A bride price was normally given by the groom to the family of the girls, usually about £10–20, enough to buy several acres of land at the time, as part of the marriage arrangements. Such payments had not been part of Cypriot tradition, and Cypriots typically describe the girls in these forced marriages as having been "sold"; Arabs however, often object to this characterization. Mostly between the ages of 11–18, the majority of the girls lost contact with their families in Cyprus, and while some had successful marriages and families, others found themselves little more than domestic servants, abused, or ended up working in brothels.

The marriages were sometimes arranged by brokers, who presented the prospective husbands as wealthy doctors and engineers. However, Neriman Cahit, in her book Brides for Sale, found that in reality many of these men had mediocre jobs or were already married with children. Unaware of these realities, Turkish Cypriot families continued to send their daughters to Palestine until the 1950s. Cahit estimates that within 30 years up to 4,000 Turkish Cypriot women were sent to Palestine to be married to Arab men.

In recent years second and third generation Palestinians of Turkish Cypriot origin have been applying for Cypriot citizenship; several hundred Palestinians have already been successful in obtaining Cypriot passports.

In 2012 Yeliz Shukri and Stavros Papageorghiou secured financial support for the making of a film on the subject of the "Forgotten Brides". The documentary, entitled Missing Fetine, was released in 2018, and follows the search of Australian-born Turkish Cypriot Pembe Mentesh for her long-lost great-aunt, while investigating the fate of these Turkish Cypriot women.

=== United Kingdom ===
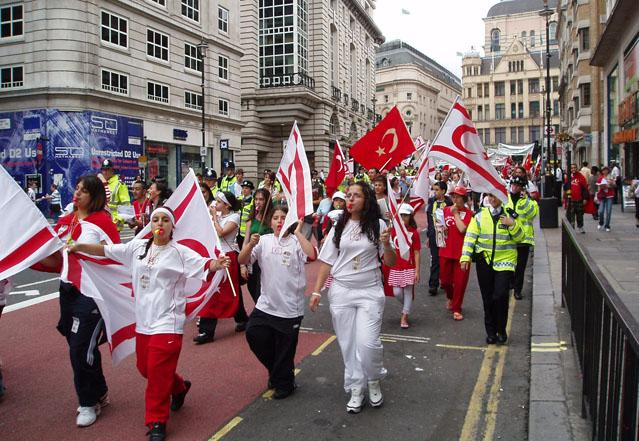
There is a strong Turkish Cypriot community in London.

Turkish Cypriot migration to the United Kingdom began in the early 1920s, the British Empire having formally annexed Cyprus in 1914, with the residents of British-ruled Cyprus becoming subjects of the Crown. Some arrived as students and tourists, while others left the island due to the harsh economic and political life during the British colony of Cyprus. Emigration to the United Kingdom continued to increase when the Great Depression of 1929 brought economic depression to Cyprus, with unemployment and low wages being a significant issue. During the Second World War, the number of Turkish run cafes increased from 20 in 1939 to 200 in 1945 which created a demand for more Turkish Cypriot workers. Throughout the 1950s, Turkish Cypriots emigrated for economic reasons and by 1958 their number was estimated to be 8,500. Their numbers continued to increase each year as rumours about immigration restrictions appeared in much of the Cypriot media.

The 1950s also saw the arrival of many Turkish Cypriots to the United Kingdom due to political reasons; many began to flee as a result of the EOKA struggle and its aim of "enosis". Once the ethnic cleansing broke out in 1963, and some 25,000 Turkish Cypriots became internally displaced, accounting to about a fifth of their population. The political and economic unrest in Cyprus, after 1964, sharply increased the number of Turkish Cypriot immigrants to the United Kingdom. Many of these early migrants worked in the clothing industry in London, where both men and women could work together; many worked in the textile industry as sewing was a skill which the community had already acquired in Cyprus. Turkish Cypriots were concentrated mainly in the north-east of London and specialised in the heavy-wear sector, such as coats and tailored garments. This sector offered work opportunities where poor knowledge of the English language was not a problem and where self-employment was a possibility.

Once the Turkish Cypriots declared their own state, the Turkish Republic of Northern Cyprus, the division of the island led to an economic embargo against the Turkish Cypriots by the Greek Cypriot controlled Republic of Cyprus. This had the effect of depriving the Turkish Cypriots of foreign investment, aid and export markets; thus, it caused the Turkish Cypriot economy to remain stagnant and undeveloped. Due to these economic and political issues, an estimated 130,000 Turkish Cypriots have emigrated from Northern Cyprus since its establishment to the United Kingdom.

Most Turkish Cypriot migrants to Britain have been residents there for around 20 years; many of their children were born in this country and there is every indication that they are making Britain their permanent home. The Turkish Cypriot population there must therefore be seen as a settled ethnic minority, and not as temporary migrant workers.

== Origins ==
Following geological separation of Cyprus from Anatolia, the first people to live in Cyprus came from Anatolia. Before Ottoman rule, Turks came from both Anatolia and Egypt. According to İsmail Bozkurt, the majority of Turkish Cypriots are of Yörük/Türkmen origin from Anatolia, who came after the Ottoman conquest of the island in 1571.

=== Genetic studies ===
Comparison of paternal DNA between Turkish Cypriots and selected populations (lower values indicate greater genetic similarity). Among the populations shown, Turkish Cypriots are genetically closest to Greek Cypriots, followed by Northern Greeks. They are more genetically distant from Eastern Anatolian Turks and most distant from the combined mainland Turkish sample.

According to genetic studies, there are close connections between modern Anatolian and Cypriot populations. A 2016 study, which focused on patrilineal ancestry, found that among the sampled Near Eastern and Southeastern European populations, Turkish Cypriots had the shortest genetic distances with those from Cyprus, Turkey, Lebanon, Greece, and Sicily.

A 2017 study found that both Turkish Cypriots' and Greek Cypriots' patrilineal ancestry derives primarily from a single pre-Ottoman local gene pool. The frequency of total haplotypes shared (Note: Shared haplotype % represents the proportion of individuals among Greek Cypriots (344 samples) and Turkish Cypriots (380 samples) having an exact 17/17 Y-STR haplotype match in the specified populations.) between Turkish and Greek Cypriots is 7-8%, with analysis showing that none of these are found in Turkey, thus not supporting a Turkish origin for the shared haplotypes. No shared haplotypes were observed between Greek Cypriots and mainland Turkish populations, while total haplotypes shared between Turkish Cypriots and mainland Turks is 3%. Turkish Cypriots also share haplotypes with North Africans to a lesser extent, and have Eastern Eurasian haplogroups (H, C, N, O, Q) – attributed to the arrival of the Ottomans – at a frequency of ~5.5%. Both Cypriot groups show close genetic affinity to Calabrian (southern Italy) and Lebanese patrilineages. The study states that the genetic affinity between Calabrians and Cypriots can be explained as a result of a common ancient Greek (Achaean) genetic contribution, while Lebanese affinity can be explained through several migrations that took place from coastal Levant to Cyprus from the Neolithic (early farmers), the Iron Age (Phoenicians), and the Middle Ages (Maronites and other Levantine settlers during the Frankish era). The predominant haplogroups among both Turkish and Greek Cypriots are J2a-M410, E-M78, and G2-P287.

In a 2019 genome-wide study, Cypriot samples grouped with people from the Levant (Druze, Lebanese and Syrians) and Armenia among the sampled populations from Eurasia and Africa, using cluster analysis based on haplotype-sharing patterns.

Homozygous beta thalassemia in a number of at-risk populations (Greek and Turkish Cypriots, Greeks, Continental Italians and Sardinians) has been prevented at the population level by programmes based on carrier screening, genetic counselling and prenatal diagnosis.

== Notable Turkish Cypriots ==
=== In Cyprus ===
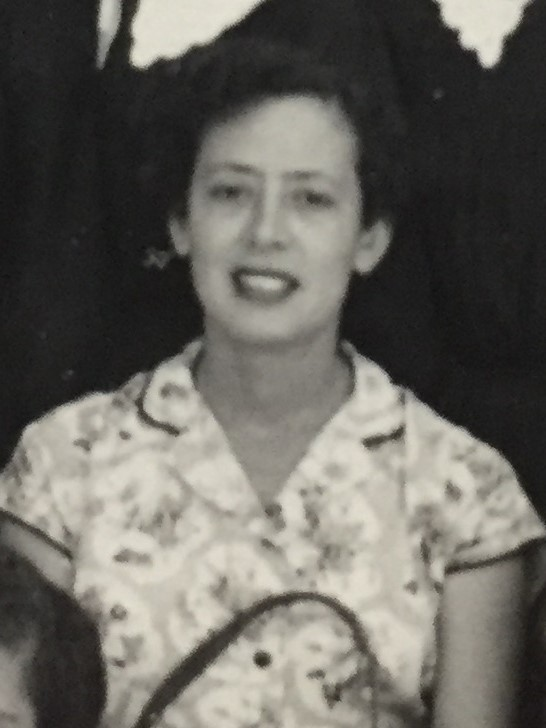
Kamran Aziz, first female Turkish Cypriot composer and pharmacist

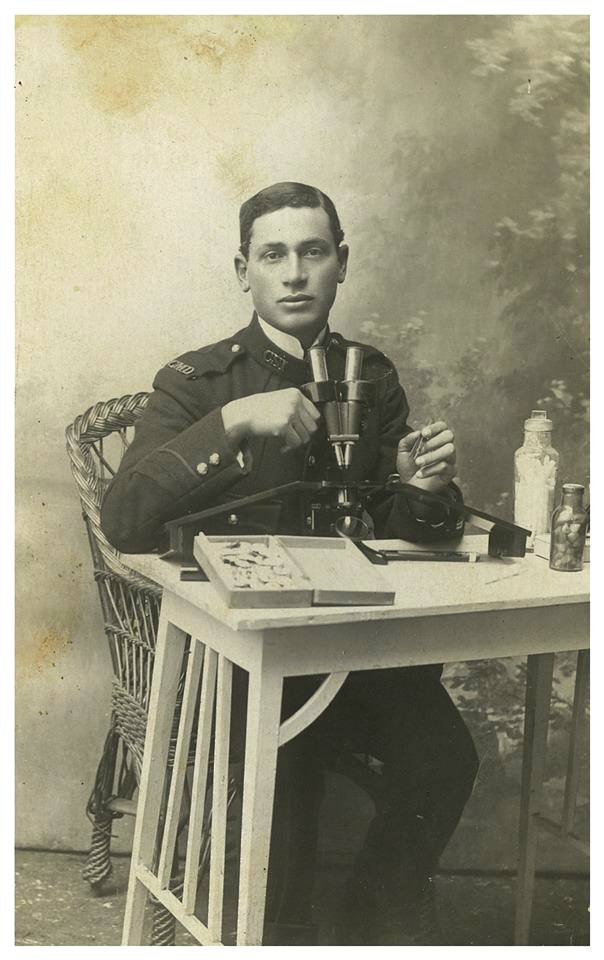
Mehmet Aziz, Chief Health Inspector in British Cyprus who eradicated malaria in Cyprus

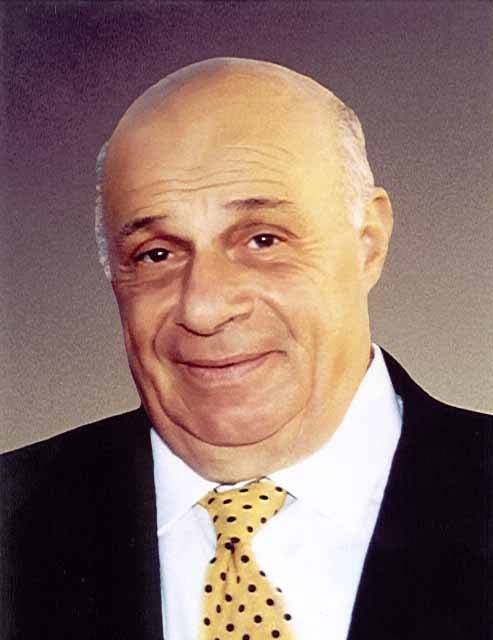
Rauf Denktaş, first president of Northern Cyprus (1983–2005)

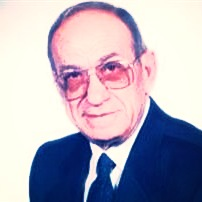
İsmet Güney, artist and creator of the Flag of the Republic of Cyprus

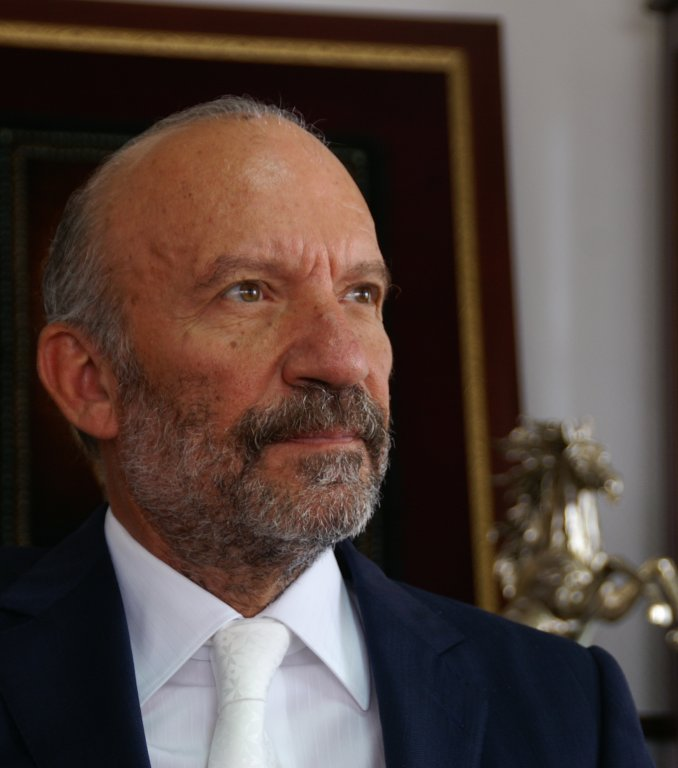
Suat Günsel, billionaire; founder of the Near East University

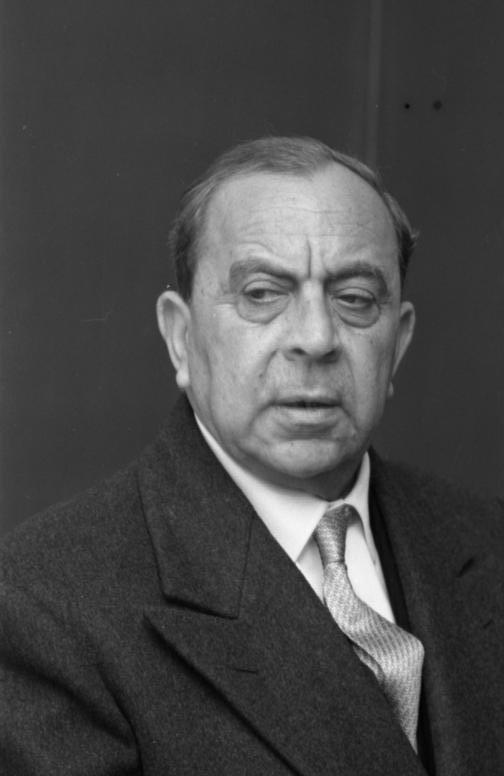
Fazıl Küçük, first vice president of the Republic of Cyprus (1959–1973)

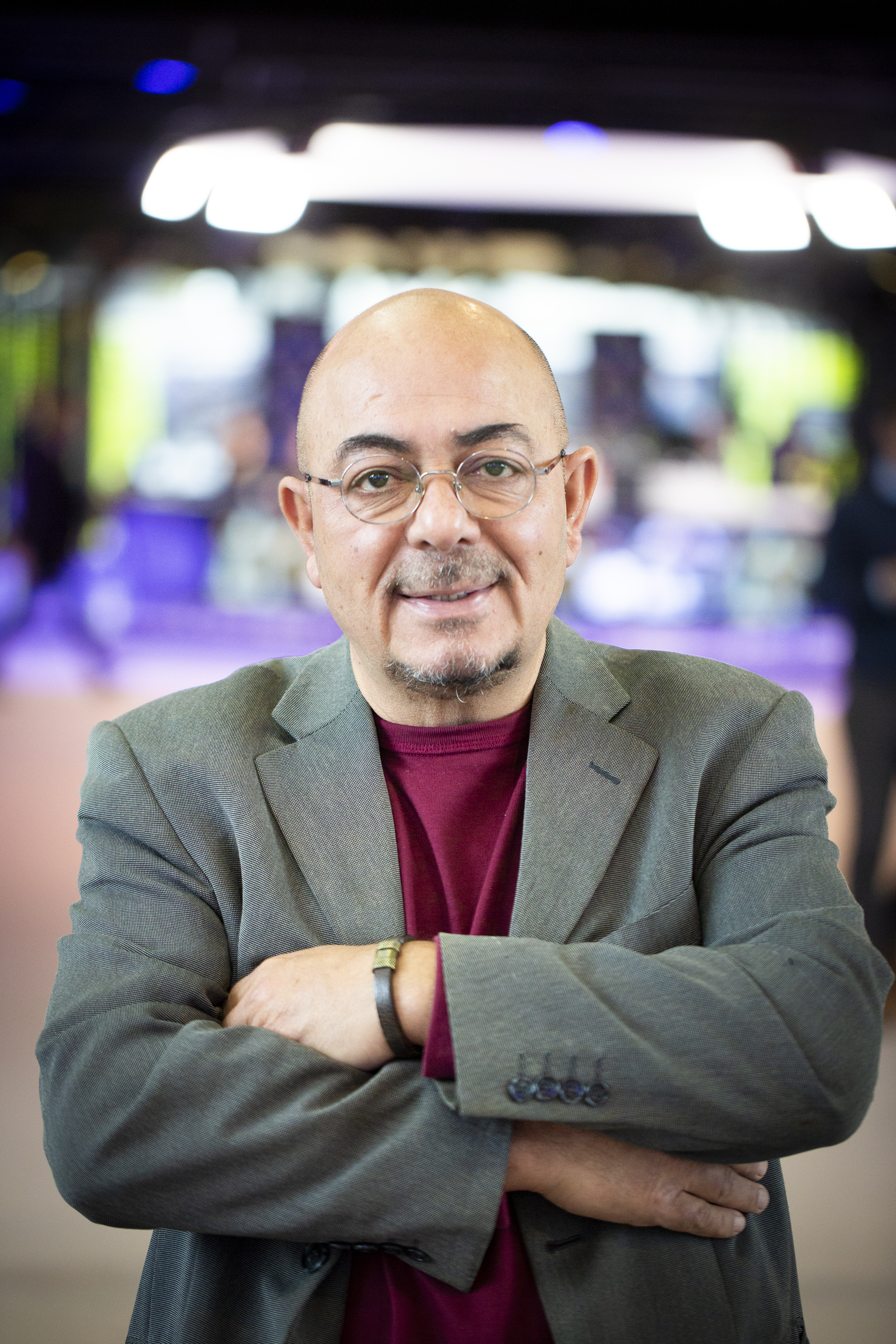
Niyazi Kızılyürek, political scientist and first Turkish Cypriot elected as an MEP (2019–present)

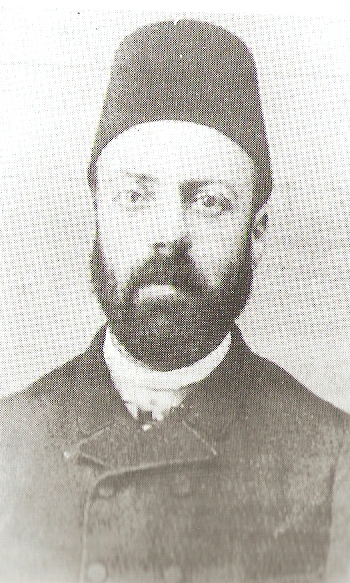
Kaytazzade Mehmet Nazım, poet

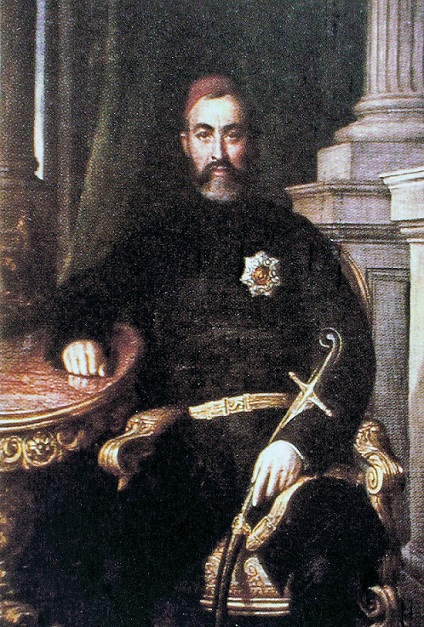
Kıbrıslı Mehmed Emin Pasha, Grand Vizier of the Ottoman Empire (1854; 1859; and 1860–61)

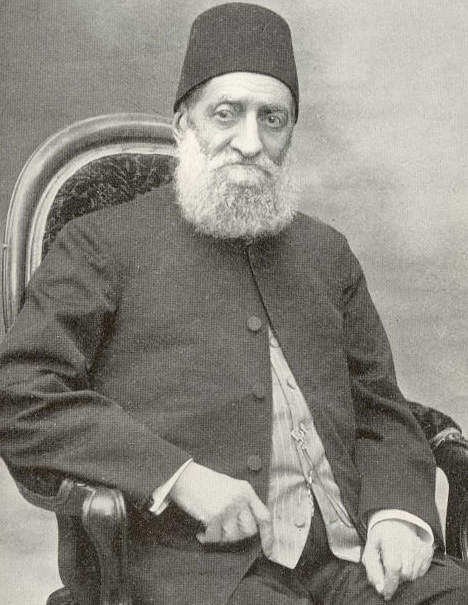
Kâmil Pasha, Grand Vizier of the Ottoman Empire (1885-1891; 1895; 1908–09; and 1912–13)

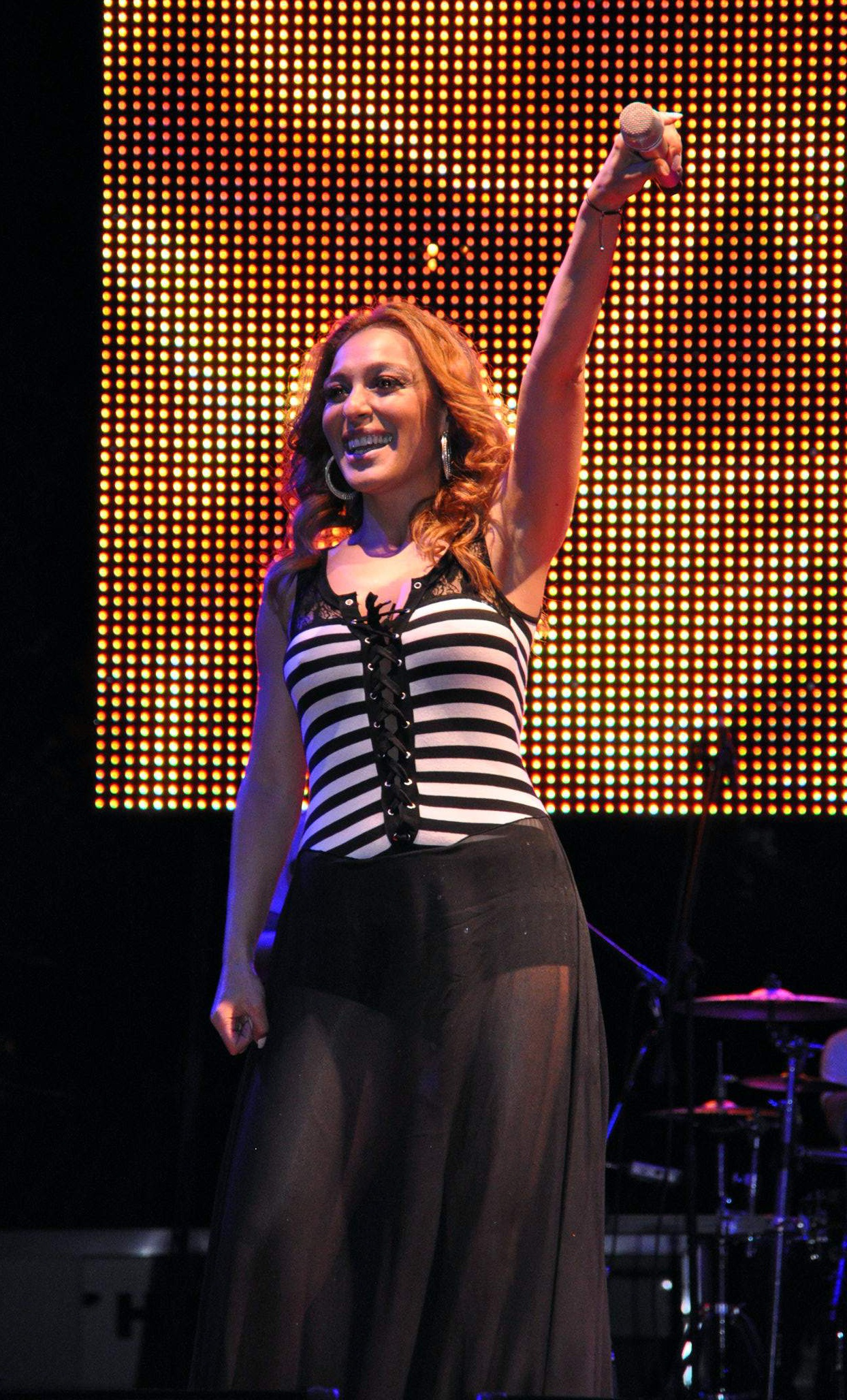
Ziynet Sali, singer

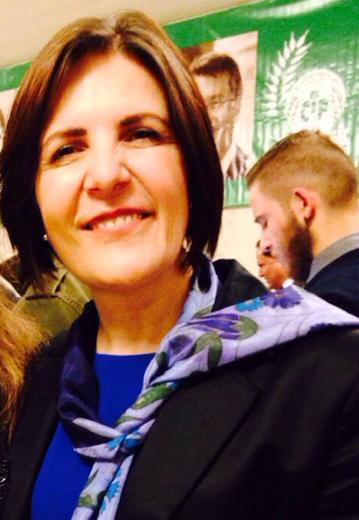
Sibel Siber, first female prime minister of Northern Cyprus (2013)

=== In the diaspora ===
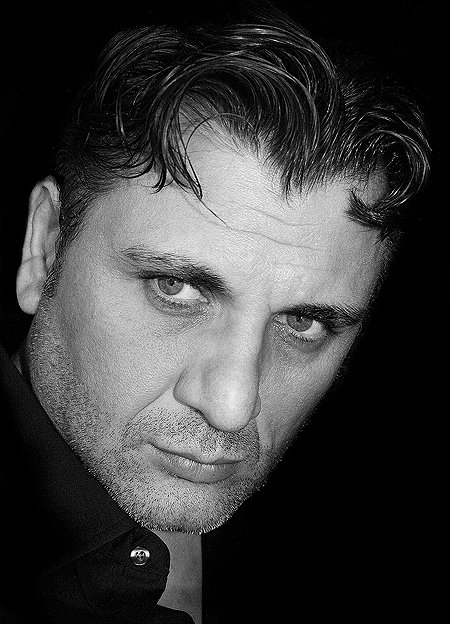
Mem Ferda, a British-born Turkish Cypriot actor

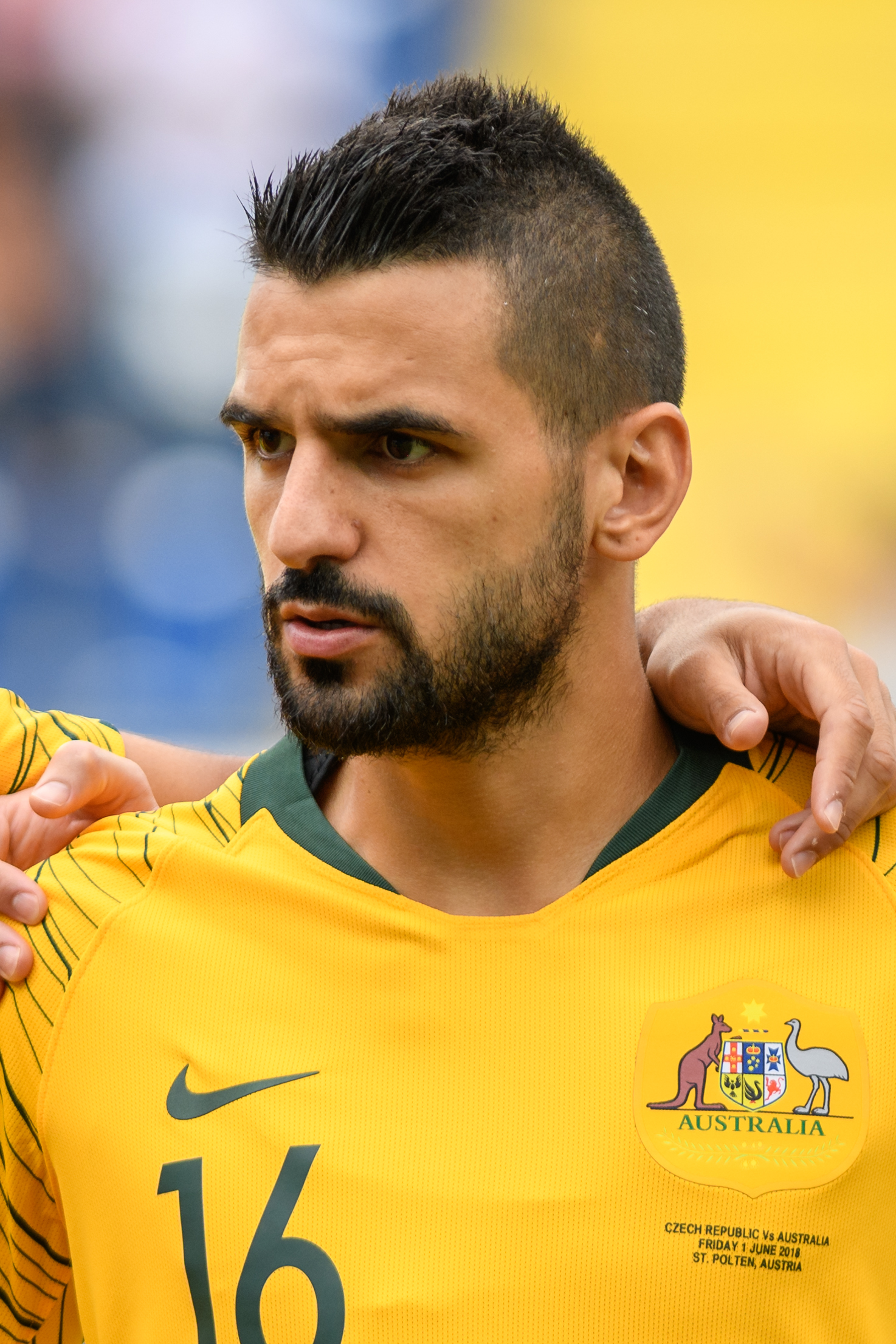
Aziz Behich, Australian-born football player

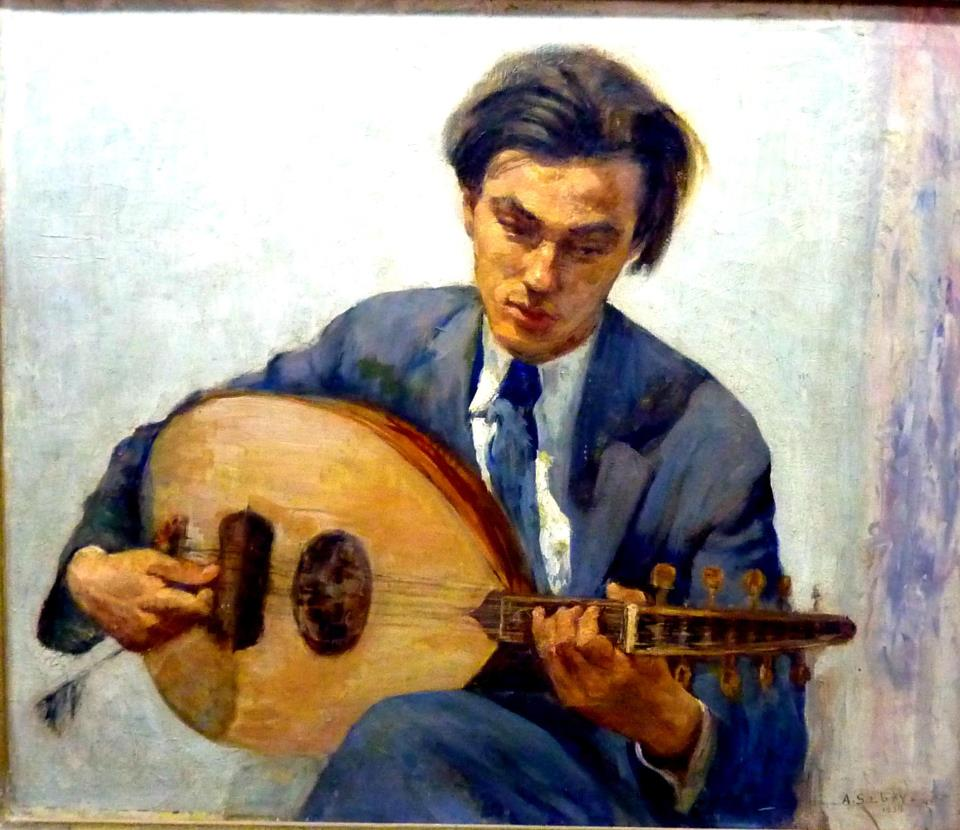
Hussein Bicar, Egyptian-born artist

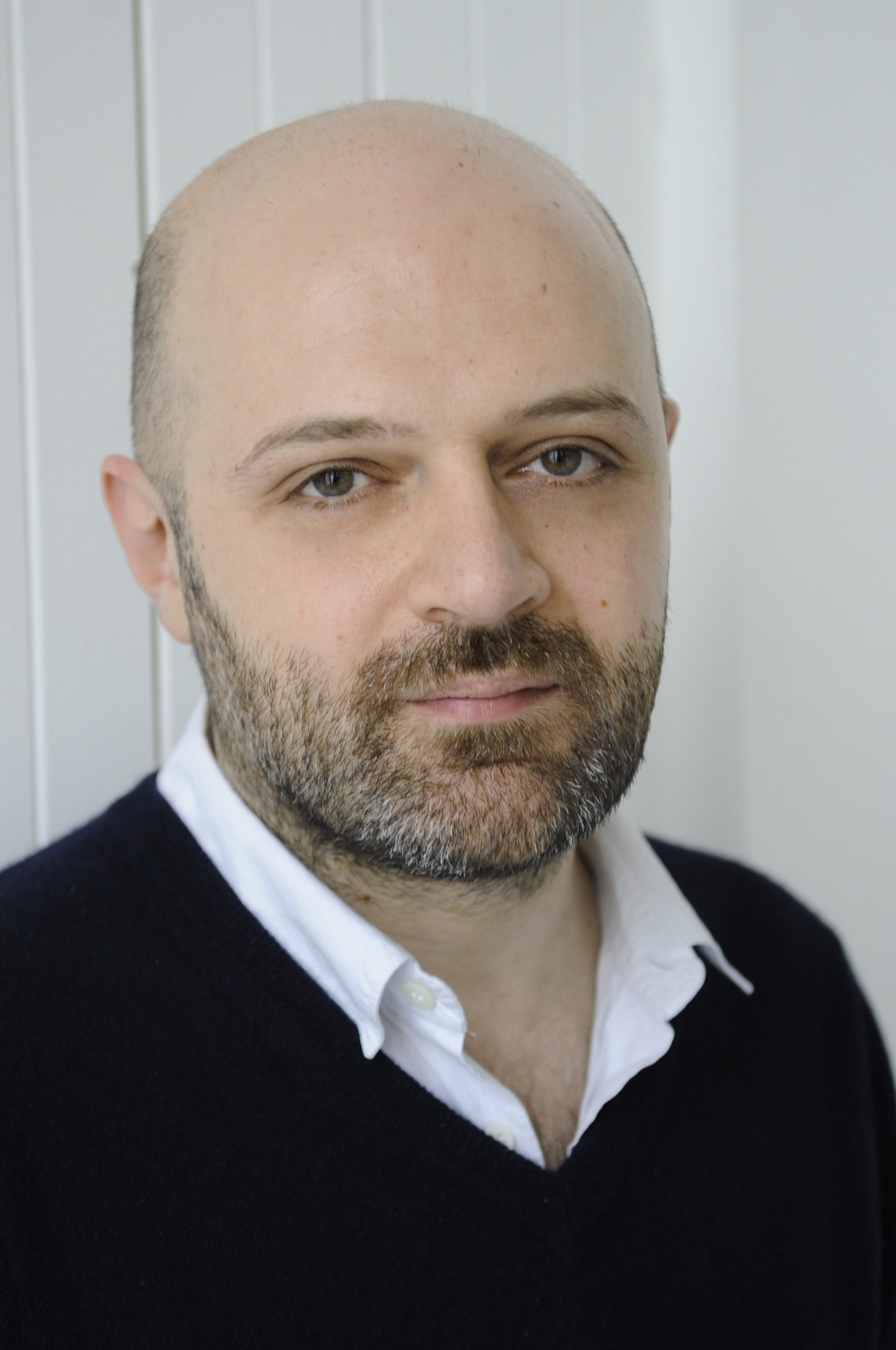
Hussein Chalayan, Turkish Cypriot-born British fashion designer

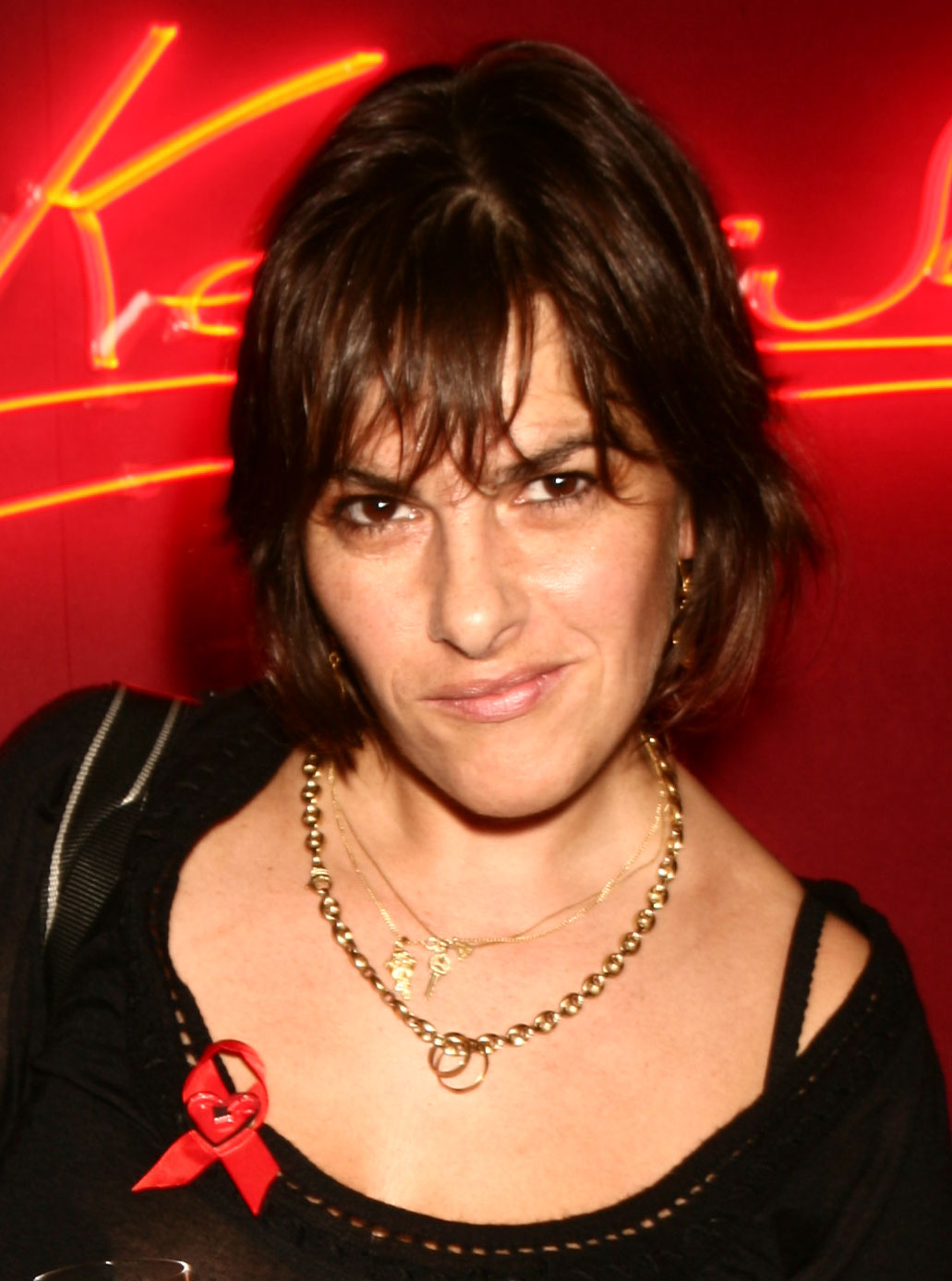
Tracey Emin, CBE, RA, British-born artist

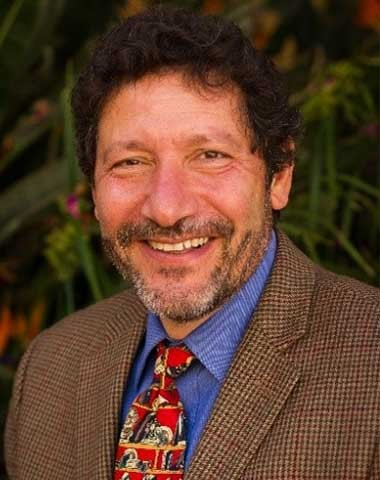
Halil Güven, Turkish Cypriot-born American Dean of San Diego State University - Georgia

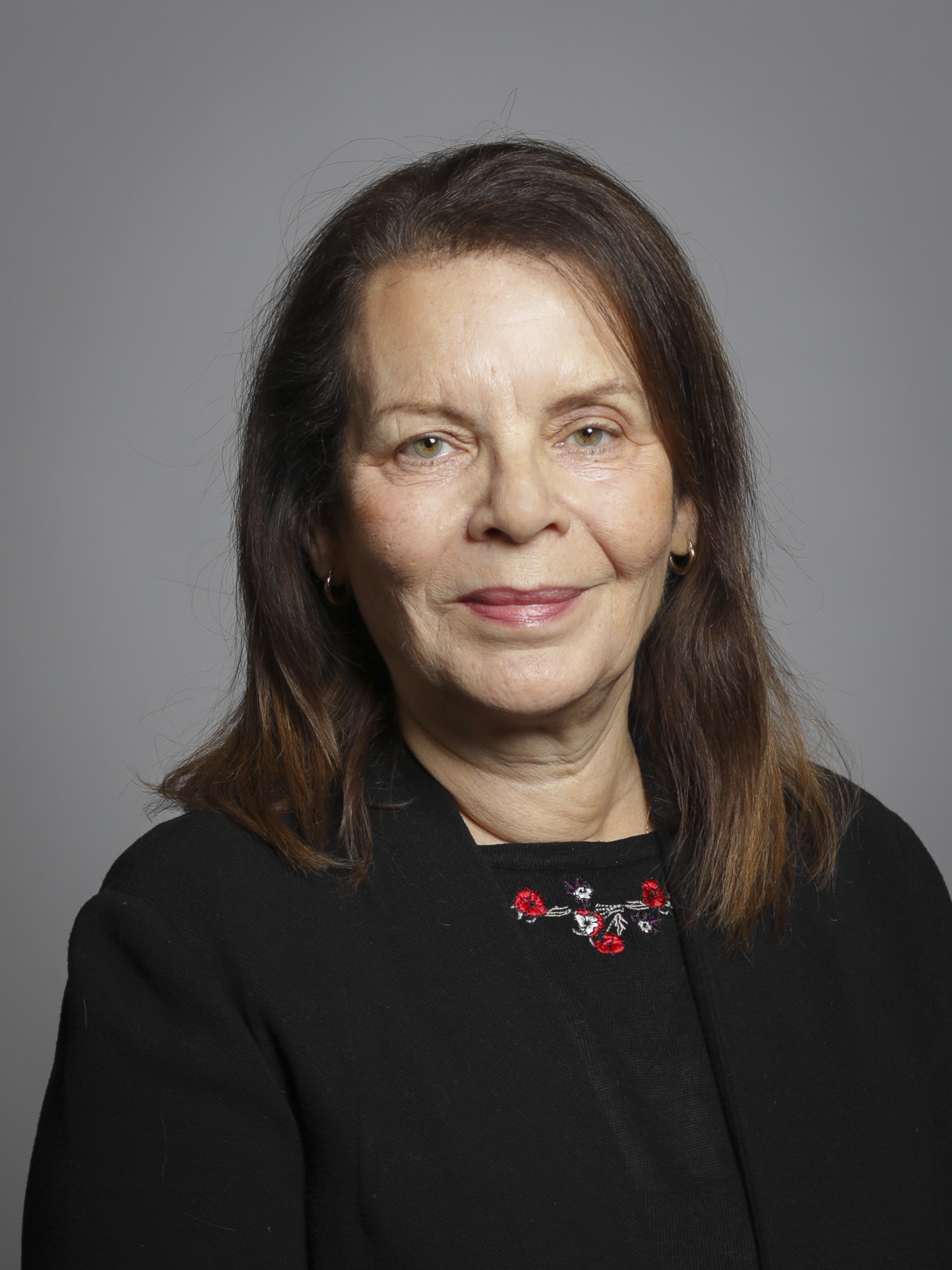
Meral Hussein-Ece, British-born member of the House of Lords

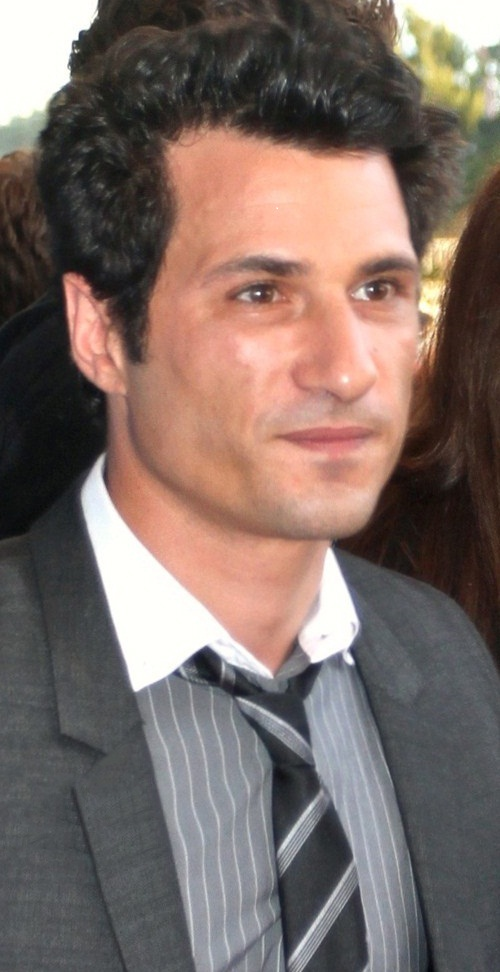
Hal Ozsan, Turkish Cypriot-born British and American actor

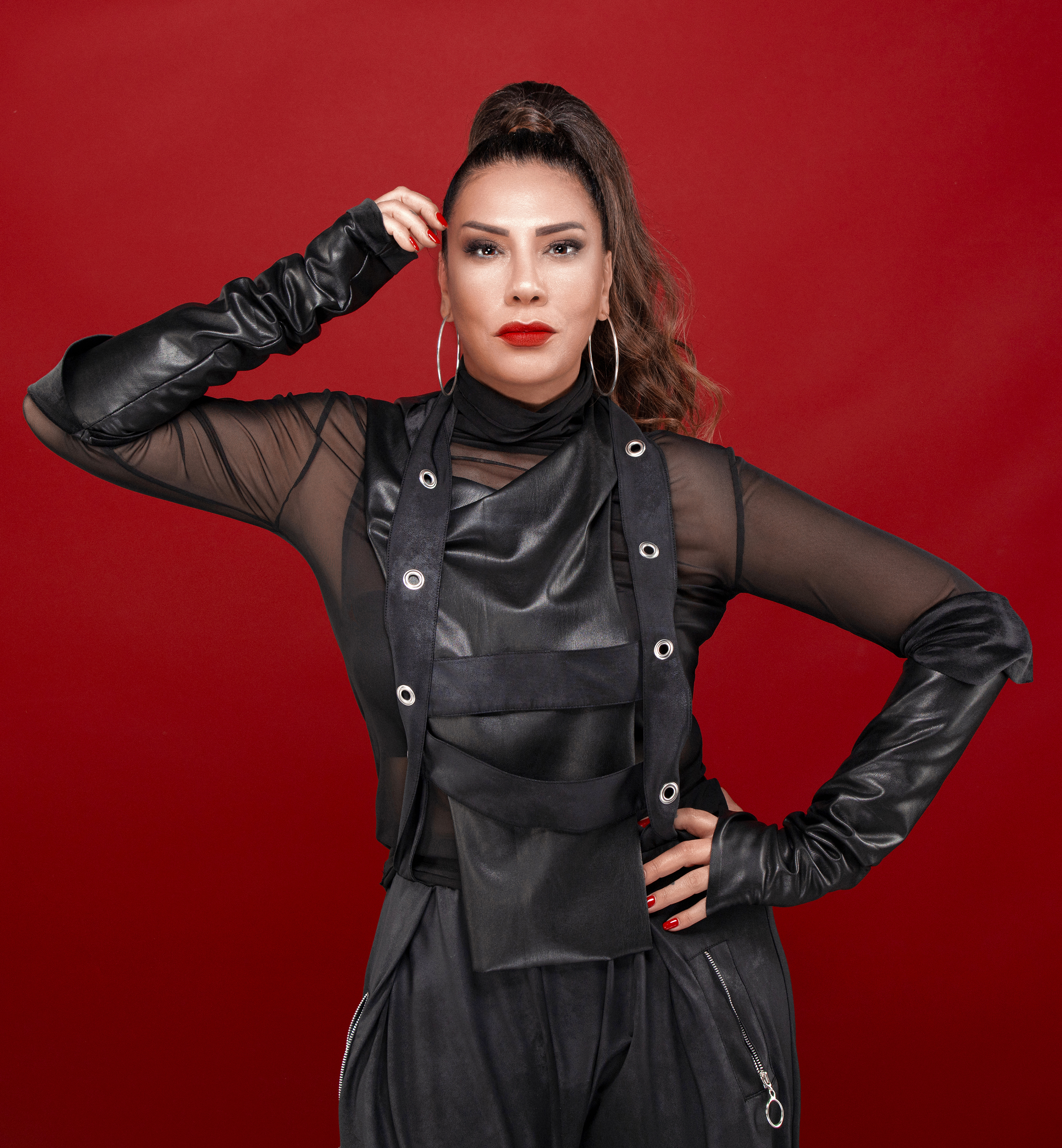
Işın Karaca, British-born Turkish Cypriot singer

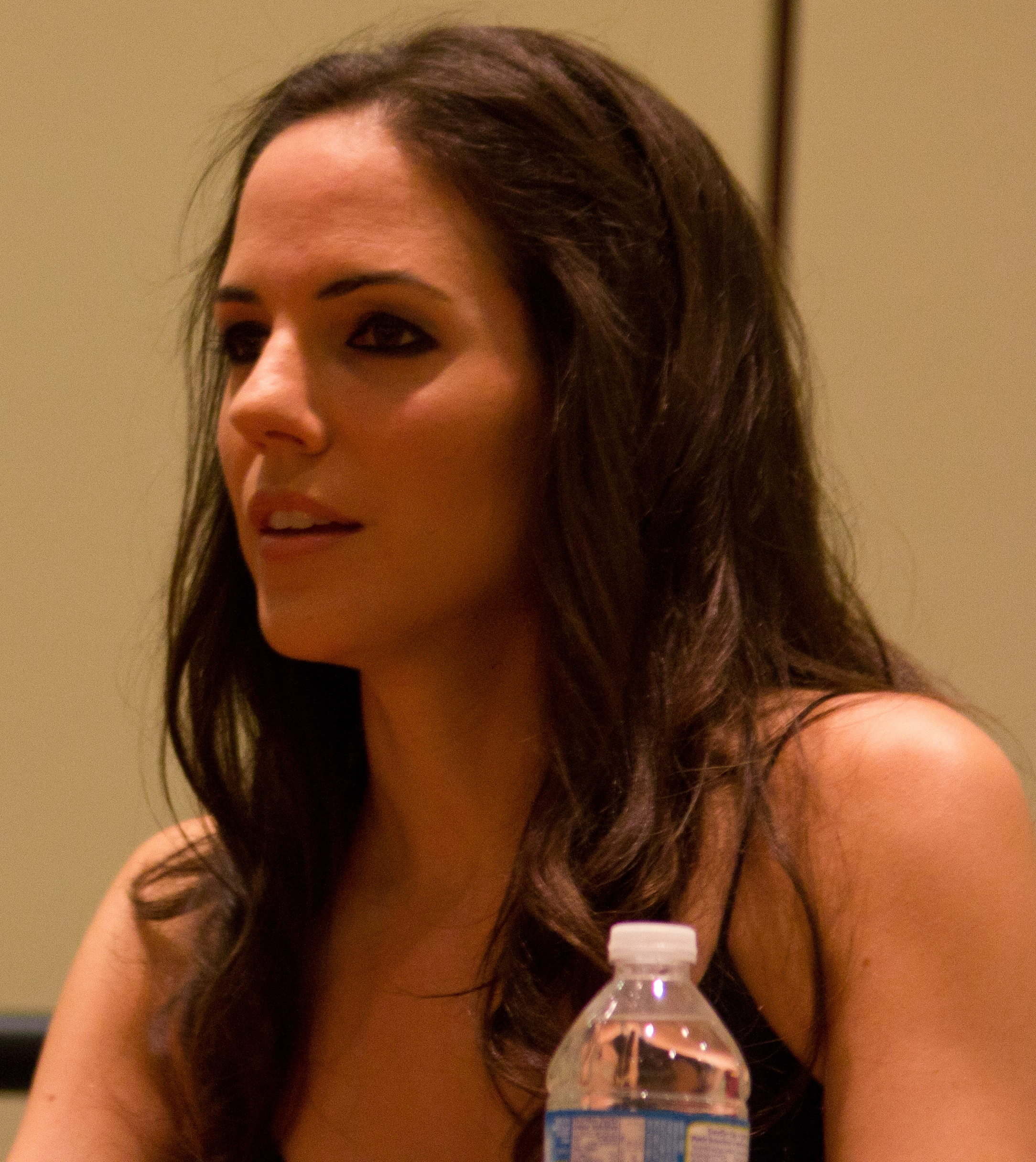
Anna Silk, Canadian-born actress

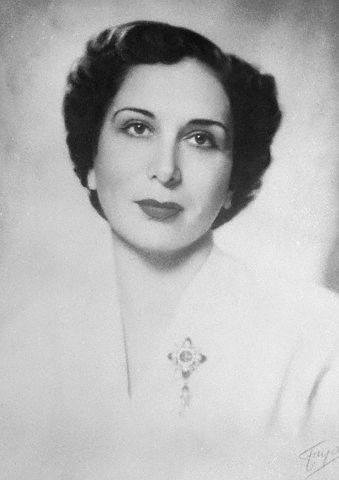
Zein al-Sharaf bint Jamil, Egyptian-born Queen of Jordan (1951–1952)

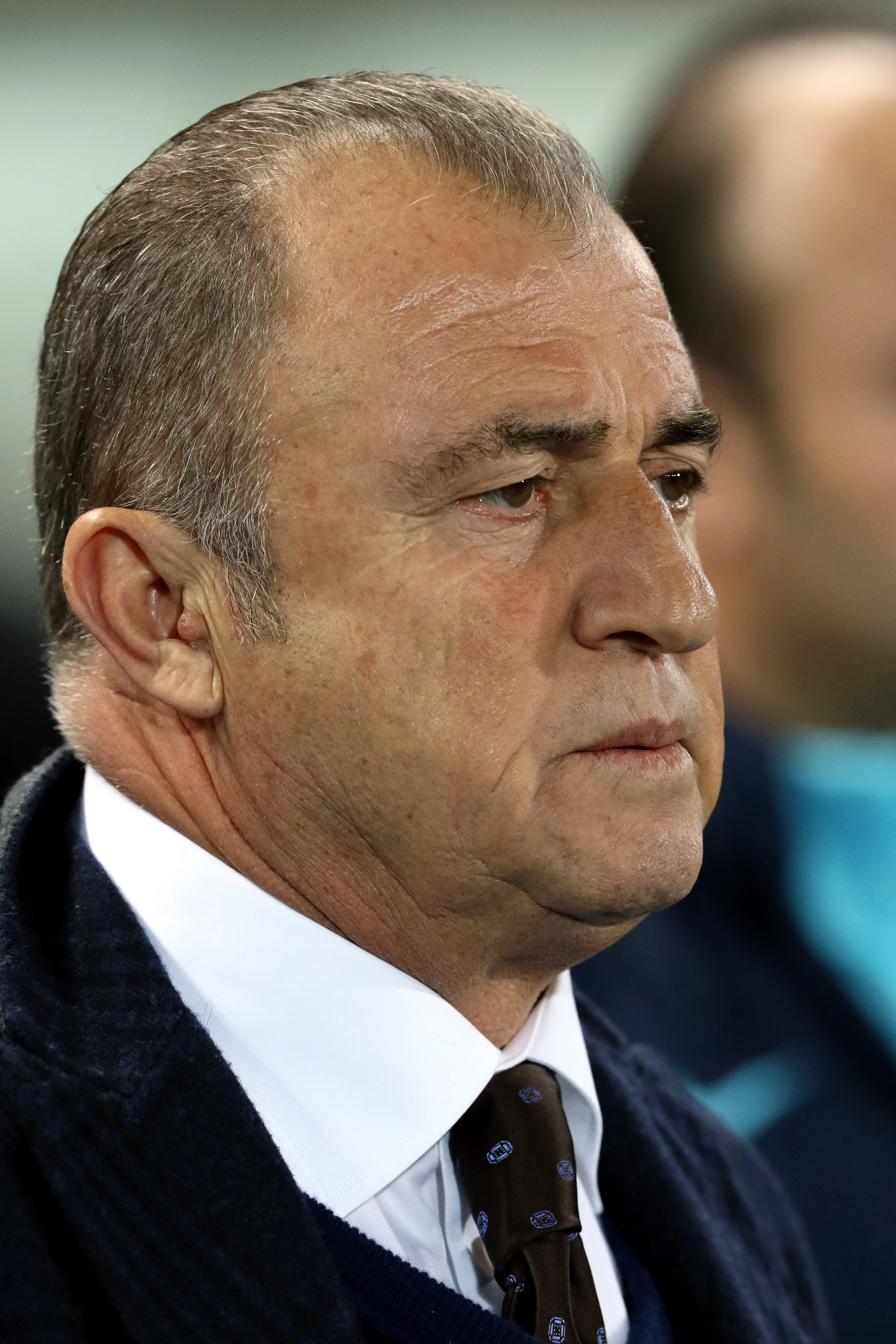
Fatih Terim, Turkish-born former manager of the Turkey national football team and Galatasaray

== Parliamentary Assembly of the Council of Europe ==
Turkish Cypriot representatives of Parliamentary Assembly of the Council of Europe (PACE) elected in the Assembly of 1960 partnership government: 1961–1964: Halit Ali Riza, 1961–1963: Umit Suleyman, 1963–1964: Burhan Nalbantoglu.

Turkish Cypriot representatives of PACE elected in the Assembly of Northern Cyprus: (TCs have two seats in PACE; the parties of elected members are shown) 2005–2007: CTP Özdil Nami; UBP Hüseyin Özgürgün; 27.01.2011 CTP Mehmet Caglar; UBP Ahmet Eti; 04.12.2013 CTP Mehmet Caglar, UBP Tahsin Ertuğruloğlu

== See also ==
- Northern Cypriot passport
- List of Turkish Cypriots
- List of Cypriots
- Cypriot refugees
- Turkish minorities in the former Ottoman Empire, neighbouring communities:
  - Turkish Bulgarians
  - Turkish Egyptians
  - Turkish Iraqis
  - Turkish Lebanese
  - Turkish Meskhetians
  - Turkish Syrians
  - Turkish Western Thracians

== Bibliography ==
- Ansari, Humayun (2004), The Infidel Within: Muslims in Britain since 1800, C. Hurst & Co. Publishers, ISBN 978-1-85065-685-2.
- Bilge, Ali Suat (1961), Le Conflit de Chypre et les Chypriotes Turcs, Ajans Türk.
- Boyle, Kevin; Sheen, Juliet (1997), Freedom of Religion and Belief: A World Report, Routledge, ISBN 0-415-15978-4.
- Bridgwood, Ann (1995), "Dancing the Jar: Girls' Dress and Turkish Cypriot Weddings", in Eicher, Joanne Bubolz (ed.), Dress and Ethnicity: Change Across Space and Time, Berg Publishers, ISBN 978-1-85973-003-4.
- Broome, Benjamin J. (2004), "Building a Shared Future across the Divide: Identity and Conflict in Cyprus", in Fong, Mary; Chuang, Rueyling (eds.), Communicating Ethnic and Cultural Identity, Rowman & Littlefield, ISBN 0-7425-1739-X.
- Bryant, Rebecca; Papadakis, Yiannis (2012), Cyprus and the Politics of Memory: History, Community and Conflict, I.B.Tauris, ISBN 978-1-78076-107-7.
- Beckingham, C.F. (1957), "The Turks of Cyprus", The Journal of the Royal Anthropological Institute of Great Britain and Ireland, 87 (2): 165–174, doi:10.2307/2844102, JSTOR 2844102.
- Çakmak, Zafer (2008), "Kıbrıs'tan Anadolu'ya Türk Göçü (1878–1938)", Türkiyat Araştırmaları Enstitüsü Dergisi, 14 (36): 201–223, doi:10.14222/turkiyat767.
- Cahit, Neriman (2014), Brides for Sale, TCAUW, ISBN 978-9963-7373-4-5.
- Canefe, Nergis (2002), "Markers of Turkish Cypriot History in the Diaspora: Power, visibility and identity", Rethinking History, 6 (1): 57–76, doi:10.1080/13642520110112119, OCLC 440918386, S2CID 143498169.
- Carment, David; James, Patrick; Taydas, Zeynep (2006), Who Intervenes?: Ethnic Conflict and Interstate Crisis, Ohio State University Press, ISBN 0-8142-1013-9.
- Cassia, Paul Sant (2007), Bodies of Evidence: Burial, Memory, and the Recovery of Missing Persons in Cyprus, Berghahn Books, ISBN 978-1-84545-228-5.
- Çevikel, Serkan (2000), Kıbrıs Eyaleti, Yönetim, Kilise, Ayan ve Halk (1750 - 1800), Eastern Mediterranean University Press, ISBN 975-93865-0-X.
- Clogg, Richard (1992), A Concise History of Greece, Cambridge University Press, ISBN 0-521-80872-3.
- Cockburn, Cynthia (2004), The line: Women, Partition and the Gender Order in Cyprus, Zed Books, ISBN 1-84277-421-2.
- Constandinides, Costas; Papadakis, Yiannis (2014), "Introduction: Scenarios of History, Themes, and Politics in Cypriot Cinemas", Cypriot Cinemas: Memory, Conflict, and Identity in the Margins of Europe, Bloomsbury Publishing, ISBN 978-1-62356-460-5.
- Constantini, Vera (2009), "In Search of Lost Prosperity: Aspects and Phases of Cyprus's Integration into the Ottoman Empire", in Michael, Michalis.N.; Kappler, Matthias; Gavriel, Eftihios (eds.), Ottoman Cyprus: A Collection of Studies on History and Culture, Harrassowitz Verlag, ISBN 978-3-447-05899-5.
- Darke, Diana (2009), North Cyprus, Bradt Travel Guides, ISBN 978-1-84162-244-6.
- Davey, Eileen (1994), Northern Cyprus: A Traveller's Guide, I.B.Tauris, ISBN 1-85043-747-5.
- Demirtaş-Coşkun, Birgül (2010), "Reconsidering the Cyprus Issue: An Anatomy of Failure of European Catalyst (1995-2002)", in Laçiner, Sedat; Özcan, Mehmet; Bal, İhsan (eds.), USAK Yearbook of International Politics and Law 2010, Vol. 3, USAK Books, ISBN 978-605-4030-26-2.
- Djavit An, Ahmet (2008), Origins of the Turkish Cypriots (PDF), Kibris Kültür Mücadelesi, archived from the original (PDF) on 26 July 2011
- Gazioğlu, Ahmet C (1990), The Turks in Cyprus: A province of the Ottoman Empire (1571–1878), K.Rustem & Brother, ISBN 9963-565-13-1.
- Göktepe, Cihat (2003), British foreign policy towards Turkey, 1959-1965, Routledge, ISBN 0-7146-5396-9.
- Goetz, Rolf (2008), Cyprus: 42 selected walks in the valleys and mountains, Bergverlag Rother GmbH, ISBN 978-3-7633-4814-5.
- Güven-Lisaniler, Fatma (2003), Assessing the Status of Women: A Step Towards Equality, Turkish Cypriot University Women Association.
- Güven-Lisaniler, Fatma; Rodriguez, Leopoldo (2002), "The social and economic impact of EU membership on northern Cyprus", in Diez, Thomas (ed.), The European Union and the Cyprus Conflict: Modern Conflict, Postmodern Union, Manchester University Press, ISBN 0-7190-6079-6.
- Hatay, Mete (2007), Is the Turkish Cypriot population shrinking? (PDF), International Peace Research Institute, ISBN 978-82-7288-244-9
- Heper, Metin; Criss, Bilge (2009), Historical Dictionary of Turkey, Scarecrow Press, ISBN 978-0-8108-6065-0.
- Hill, George Francis (1948), A History of Cyprus. Vol.2: The Frankish Period, 1192-1432, Cambridge University Press, ISBN 1-108-02063-1.
- Hill, George Francis (1948b), A History of Cyprus. Vol.3: The Frankish Period, 1432-1571, Cambridge University Press, ISBN 1-108-02064-X.
- Hill, George Francis (1952), A History of Cyprus. Vol.4: The Ottoman province, the British colony, 1571-1948, Cambridge University Press, ISBN 1-108-02065-8.
- Hüssein, Serkan (2007), Yesterday & Today: Turkish Cypriots of Australia, Serkan Hussein, ISBN 978-0-646-47783-1.
- Inalcik, Halil, A Note of the Population of Cyprus (PDF), Bilkent University, archived from the original (PDF) on 18 July 2011.
- Ioannides, Christos P. (1991), In Turkeys Image: The Transformation of Occupied Cyprus into a Turkish Province, Aristide D. Caratzas, ISBN 0-89241-509-6.
- Jennings, Ronald (1993), Christians and Muslims in Ottoman Cyprus and the Mediterranean World, 1571-1640, New York University Press, ISBN 0-8147-4181-9.
- Johanson, Lars (2011), "Multilingual states and empires in the history of Europe: the Ottoman Empire", in Kortmann, Bernd; Van Der Auwera, Johan (eds.), The Languages and Linguistics of Europe: A Comprehensive Guide, Volume 2, Walter de Gruyter, ISBN 978-3-11-022025-4
- Kızılyürek, Niyazi (2006), "The Turkish Cypriots from an Ottoman-Muslim Community to a National Community", in Faustmann, Hubert; Peristianis, Nicos (eds.), Britain in Cyprus: Colonialism and Post-Colonialism, 1878-2006, Bibliopolis, ISBN 3-933925-36-3.
- Kliot, Nurit (2007), "Resettlement of Refugees in Finland and Cyprus: A Comparative Analysis and Possible Lessons for Israel", in Kacowicz, Arie Marcelo; Lutomski, Pawel (eds.), Population resettlement in international conflicts: a comparative study, Lexington Books, ISBN 978-0-7391-1607-4.
- Machairas, Leontios (1932), Recital Concerning the Sweet Land of Cyprus, Entitled 'Chronicle', Volume 2, Clarendon Press.
- Mert, Kadir; Ali-Aybar, Mehmet; Rize, Ekrem (1994), "Kıbrıslı Türk Kimliği", K.K.T.C. Milli Eğitim ve Kültür Bakanlığı Yayınları, 97 (17).
- Mikropoulos, Tassos A. (2008), Elevating and Safeguarding Culture Using Tools of the Information Society: Dusty traces of the Muslim culture, Earthlab, ISBN 978-960-233-187-3.
- Nesim, Ali (1987), Batmayan Eğitim Güneşlerimiz, KKTC Milli Eğitim ve Kültür Bakanlığı.
- Nevzat, Altay (2005), Nationalism Amongst the Turks of Cyprus: The First Wave (PDF), Oulu University Press, ISBN 951-42-7750-3.
- Nevzat, Altay; Hatay, Mete (2009), "Politics, Society and the Decline of Islam in Cyprus: From the Ottoman Era to the Twenty-First Century", Middle Eastern Studies, 45 (6): 911–933, doi:10.1080/00263200903268686, S2CID 144063498.
- Orhonlu, Cengiz (1971), "The Ottoman Turks Settle in Cyprus", in Inalcık, Halil (ed.), The First International Congress of Cypriot Studies: Presentations of the Turkish Delegation, Institute for the Study of Turkish Culture.
- Panayiotopoulos, Prodromos; Dreef, Marja (2002), "London: Economic Differentiation and Policy Making", in Rath, Jan (ed.), Unravelling the rag trade: immigrant entrepreneurship in seven world cities, Berg Publishers, ISBN 978-1-85973-423-0.
- Panteli, Stavros (1990), The Making of Modern Cyprus: From Obscurity to Statehood, CInterworld Publications, ISBN 0-948853-09-3.
- Papadakis, Yiannis (2005), Echoes from the Dead Zone: Across the Cyprus divide, I.B.Tauris, ISBN 1-85043-428-X.
- Percival, David Athelstane (1948), Cyprus: Census of Population and Agriculture 1946, Crown Agents for the Colonies.
- Rowan-moorhouse, Libby (2007), In the Land of Aphrodite, Power Publishing, ISBN 978-9963-673-17-9.
- Rudolph, Joseph Russell (2008), Hot spot: North America and Europe, ABC-CLIO, ISBN 978-0-313-33621-8.
- Salih, Halil Ibrahim (1968), Cyprus: An Analysis of Cypriot Political Discord, Brooklyn: T. Gaus' Sons.
- Savvides, Philippos K (2004), "Partition Revisited: The International Dimension and the Case of Cyprus", in Danopoulos, Constantine Panos; Vajpeyi, Dhirendra K.; Bar-Or, Amir (eds.), Civil-military relations, nation building, and national identity: comparative perspectives, Greenwood Publishing Group, ISBN 0-275-97923-7.
- Shawn, Stanford J. (1976), History of the Ottoman Empire and modern Turkey, Volume 1, Cambridge University Press, ISBN 0-521-29163-1.
- Sonyel, Salahi R. (2000), "Turkish Migrants in Europe" (PDF), Perceptions, 5 (Sept–Nov 2000), Center for Strategic Research: 146–153, archived from the original (PDF) on 18 July 2011
- Spilling, Michael (2000), Cyprus, Marshall Cavendish, ISBN 0-7614-0978-5.
- St. John-Jones, L.W. (1983), Population of Cyprus: Demographic Trends and Socio-economic Influences, Maurice Temple Smith Ltd, ISBN 0-85117-232-6.
- Strüder, Inge R. (2003), Do concepts of ethnic economies explain existing minority enterprises? The Turkish speaking economies in London (PDF), London School of Economics, ISBN 0-7530-1727-X
- Tocci, Nathalie (2004), EU accession dynamics and conflict resolution: catalysing peace or consolidating partition in Cyprus?, Ashgate Publishing, ISBN 0-7546-4310-7.
- Tocci, Nathalie (2007), The EU and Conflict Resolution: Promoting Peace in the Backyard, Routledge, ISBN 978-0-415-41394-7.
- TRNC PRIME MINISTRY STATE PLANNING ORGANIZATION (2006), TRNC General Population and Housing Unit Census (PDF), TRNC Prime Ministry State Planning Organization
- Turkish Cypriot Human Rights Committee (1979), Human rights in Cyprus, University of Michigan.
- Welin, Gustaf; Ekelund, Christer (2004), The UN in Cyprus: Swedish Peace-keeping Operations 1964-1993, Hurst & Company, ISBN 1-85065-741-6.
- Xypolia, Ilia (2011), "Cypriot Muslims among Ottomans, Turks and British", Bogazici Journal, 25 (2): 109–120, doi:10.21773/boun.25.2.6
- Yilmaz, Ihsan (2005), Muslim Laws, Politics and Society in Modern Nation States: Dynamic Legal Pluralisms in England, Turkey and Pakistan, Ashgate Publishing, ISBN 0-7546-4389-1.
