= Muhassıl Osman Pasha =

Muhassıl Osman Pasha ("Osman Pasha the Tax-collector"; died 27 November 1750), also known as Halepli Osman Pasha ("of Aleppo") or Uthman Pasha al-Halabi, was an Ottoman statesman. He served as the Ottoman governor of various provinces (eyalets), including Tripoli (1731–33, 1735–39), Egypt (1733–35), Damascus (1739–40), Adana (1740), Sidon (1740–46), and Jeddah (1746–50, again in 1750).

He was originally from Aleppo and became a vizier in December 1731. He died in office while governor of Jeddah on 27 November 1750.

== As governor of Egypt ==
According to al-Jabarti, during Osman Pasha's term as governor of Egypt from 1733 to 1735, there was a man claiming to be a prophet as well as widespread apocalyptic fears. The man was beaten by the authorities, and when the Day of Judgment failed to occur, the people claimed that their religious leaders had prayed to Allah to delay the apocalypse.

== See also ==
- List of Ottoman governors of Egypt
- List of Ottoman governors of Damascus

Political offices
Preceded by Silahdar Damat Mehmed Pasha	Ottoman Governor of Egypt; 1733–1735	Succeeded by Ebubekir Pasha
