= Ebubekir Pasha (1670–1759) =

Ottoman statesman

Ebubekir Pasha Pasha

Kapudan Pasha

Personal details
- Born: 1670 Alaiye, Ottoman Empire (modern-day Alanya, Turkey)
- Died: 1759 (aged approx. 89) Istanbul, Ottoman Empire
- Resting place: Aksaray, Istanbul
- Spouse: Safiye Sultan (m. 1740)

Ebubekir Pasha (Ottoman Turkish: ابوبکر پاشا; Turkish: Ebubekir Paşa; 1670 – 1759), also referred to as Koca Bekir Pasha (Turkish: Koca Bekir Paşa) and Abu Bakr Pasha or Abubakr Pasha (Serbo-Croatian: Ebu Bekir Paša; Greek: Απού Μπεκίρ Πασάς), was an Ottoman statesman. He served as Kapudan Pasha (Grand Admiral of the Navy; 1732–33, 1750–51); as governor (beylerbey) of the provinces of Egypt, Jeddah, Habesh, Anatolia, Rumelia, the Morea, Cyprus, Euboea, and Bosnia; as head of the Imperial Mint; and as Şeyhü'l-harem (Guardian of the Sacred Precincts) of Mecca, a title conferred on him in 1724. In 1740 he became the fourth and last husband of Safiye Sultan, daughter of Sultan Mustafa II.

Koca Bekir Pasha was considered one of the most enlightened and productive statesmen of his time.

== Background ==
Ebubekir was born in 1670 in Alaiye (modern-day Alanya, Turkey). He was of Turkish origin.

== Early career ==
Ebubekir Pasha was a relative of Alâiyeli Kel Yusuf Efendi, a prominent finance official who rose from the imperial treasury to head the Mint and the Imperial Arsenal. After entering the palace service, Ebubekir served as a silahdar (armourer), then as a customs officer and kapıcıbaşı (chief gatekeeper). He was appointed çavuşbaşı (chief of couriers) in April 1718. An eye illness forced his temporary reassignment as superintendent of the Imperial Mint, but he was reinstated as çavuşbaşı in May 1723. In December 1724 he was elevated to vizier, reportedly after Sultan Ahmed III personally visited the paşa kapısı to interview him before confirming the appointment, and was given the governorships of Jeddah and Habesh together with the title of Şeyhü'l-harem of Mecca.

== Bekir Pasha (Kamares) Aqueduct ==
His most notable legacy is the still-standing Kamares Aqueduct, also known as the Bekir Pasha Aqueduct, begun in 1747 during his tenure as the Governor of Cyprus, which he financed personally to aid the water supply to the area.

Realizing the difficulties of fresh water access for the poor in the city, Koca Bekir Pasha built this massive aqueduct to improve the water supply to Larnaca. Built in the Roman style, the aqueduct carried water from a source about 6 miles (9.7 km) south of Larnaca into the town. The water supply works involved a long tunnel, 250 air wells, and three series of overland arches.

Foreign travelers have often counted it as the most important monument constructed during the Ottoman period in Cyprus. In 1754, Alexander Drummond noted that:

For the honour of Ebu Bekir Paşa I must communicate an instance of the old gentlemen's public spirit. While he was Paşa of this land, in the year 1747, he formed the noble design of bringing water from the river at Arpera, and occasional springs on the road about six miles from hence, to supply the people of Larnaca, Salines and the shipping. A work worthy of great and good man, which might have cost him above fifty thousand piasters of six thousand pounds.

The aqueduct was completed in 1750 and consists of three spans of cut stone arches, of which 75 survive today: a first span near the Arpera River with 50 arches, a second with 12, and a third over the valley at Çiftlik Paşa village near Larnaca with 31 arches. It was restored in 1854 and 1876, and remained in active use until 1939. A five-year conservation project on the Çiftlik Paşa span began in 1987. The British traveller Sir Samuel Baker, visiting Cyprus in 1878, noted that the system's line wells (sıra kuyuları) were dug at successively decreasing elevations, so that water flowed from the source to Larnaca entirely by gravity. Relics of the aqueduct still stand outside Larnaca and are referred to as "The Kamares" ("The Arches") today. The aqueduct is illuminated at night.

== Other work ==
His signature is found under many major construction and reconstruction projects in every city he served as a governor.

During his second governorship of Egypt in 1734, Ebubekir Pasha was present during an uprising of Mamluk emirs in Cairo known in the Ottoman records as the vak'a-i şûr-i engiz ("the incident that provoked disorder"), which ended in the deaths of ten emirs and led to his removal from the post.

Ebubekir Pasha was appointed to Cyprus in 1747, shortly after the island had been reconstituted as an independent eyalet with three-horsetail pasha status in 1745. During his tenure he financed extensive public works on the island from his personal funds, placing them under the administration of the Ebubekir Paşa Vakfı, the foundation he established for their upkeep. In Nicosia, he founded the Sarayönü madrasa in 1748 and restored the primary school in the courtyard of the Sarayönü Mosque, and had 23 shops built to generate waqf income for its upkeep. In Larnaca and the adjoining Tuzla district, he funded seven public fountains, water wells, and a flour mill, and established a farm at Arpera together with mulberry gardens and a vineyard as endowment.

During his service in the Morea (1740–1743), Ebubekir Pasha founded a religious and commercial complex in Tripolitsa (modern Tripoli) in the central Peloponnese. The foundation charter is dated 1741 (21 Şaban 1154 AH) and is registered with the Turkish Directorate General of Foundations in his name. The complex comprised a domed mosque, a madrasa, a primary school, a hamam, a covered bazaar, and a caravanserai. The French physician François Pouqueville, detained in Tripolitsa in 1798, recorded the topography of the city and noted that its mosques were built with ancient marble columns and inscriptions reused as spolia.

Following the fall of Ottoman Tripolitsa during the Greek War of Independence, the complex was dismantled. The church of Agios Vasilios was built on the same site between 1855 and 1884, its foundation stone laid on 6 November 1855 and its consecration held on 3 June 1884. The church reuses the mosque's foundations and retains its orientation toward the qibla.

== Death and legacy ==
Koca Bekir Pasha died in 1759 at the age of about 89 and was buried in the school he had built opposite Çakır Ağa Mosque in the Aksaray district of Istanbul.

He donated his property to a foundation (Turkish: vakıf) in his name and his will has been documented in detail. Over the course of his career he established pious foundations in Istanbul, İzmir, Mecca, Jeddah, Egypt, the Morea, and Cyprus, supporting schools, mosques, fountains, and water systems across the empire.

== See also ==
- List of admirals in the Ottoman Empire
- List of Ottoman Kapudan Pashas
- List of Ottoman governors of Egypt
- List of Ottoman governors of Bosnia
- Ottoman Cyprus

== Footnotes ==
- ^a Turkish for "Great" or "Old"

Political offices
Preceded by Nişancı Mehmed Pasha	Ottoman Governor of Egypt; 1727–1729	Succeeded by Abdi Pasha
Preceded by Muhassıl Osman Pasha	Ottoman Governor of Egypt; 1735–1739	Succeeded by Sulayman Pasha al-Azm
Military offices
Preceded by Hacı Hüseyin Pasha	Kapudan Pasha; 1732–1733	Succeeded by Canım Hoca Mehmed Pasha
Preceded by Şehsuvarzade Mustafa Pasha	Kapudan Pasha; 1751–1751	Succeeded by Durak Mehmed Pasha
