= Kamares Aqueduct =

Aqueduct located in Larnaca, Cyprus

Coordinates: 34.912131°N 33.598729°E

Kamares Aqueduct, also known as the Bekir Pasha Aqueduct, is an aqueduct near Larnaca, Cyprus. Located just outside the city near the old road to Limassol, it was built between 1747 and 1750 and supplied Larnaca with fresh water for nearly two centuries. Tassos Mikropoulos has described it as the most prominent water supply built in Cyprus.

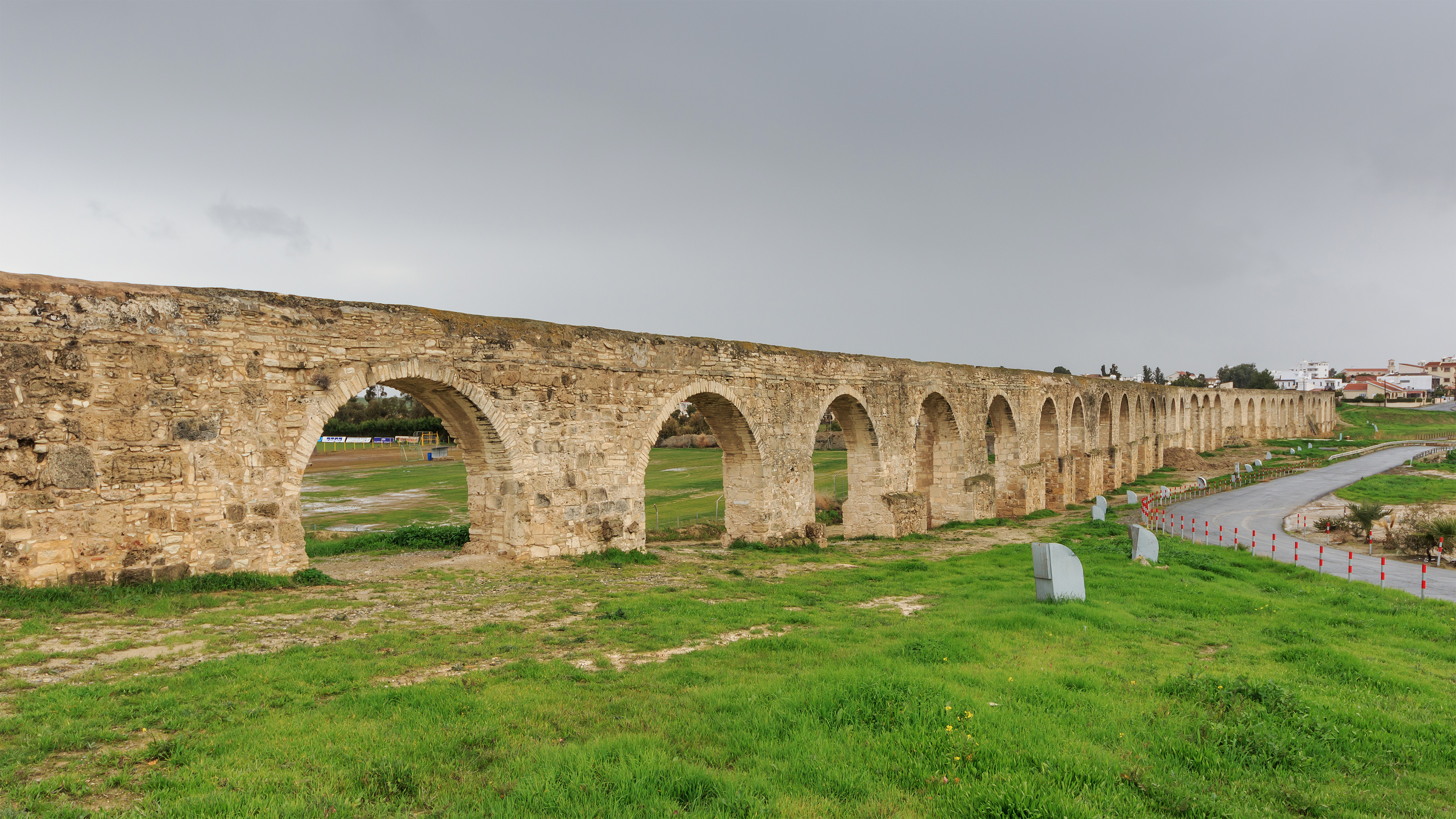
Larnaca, Cyprus, aqueduct known as Kamares.

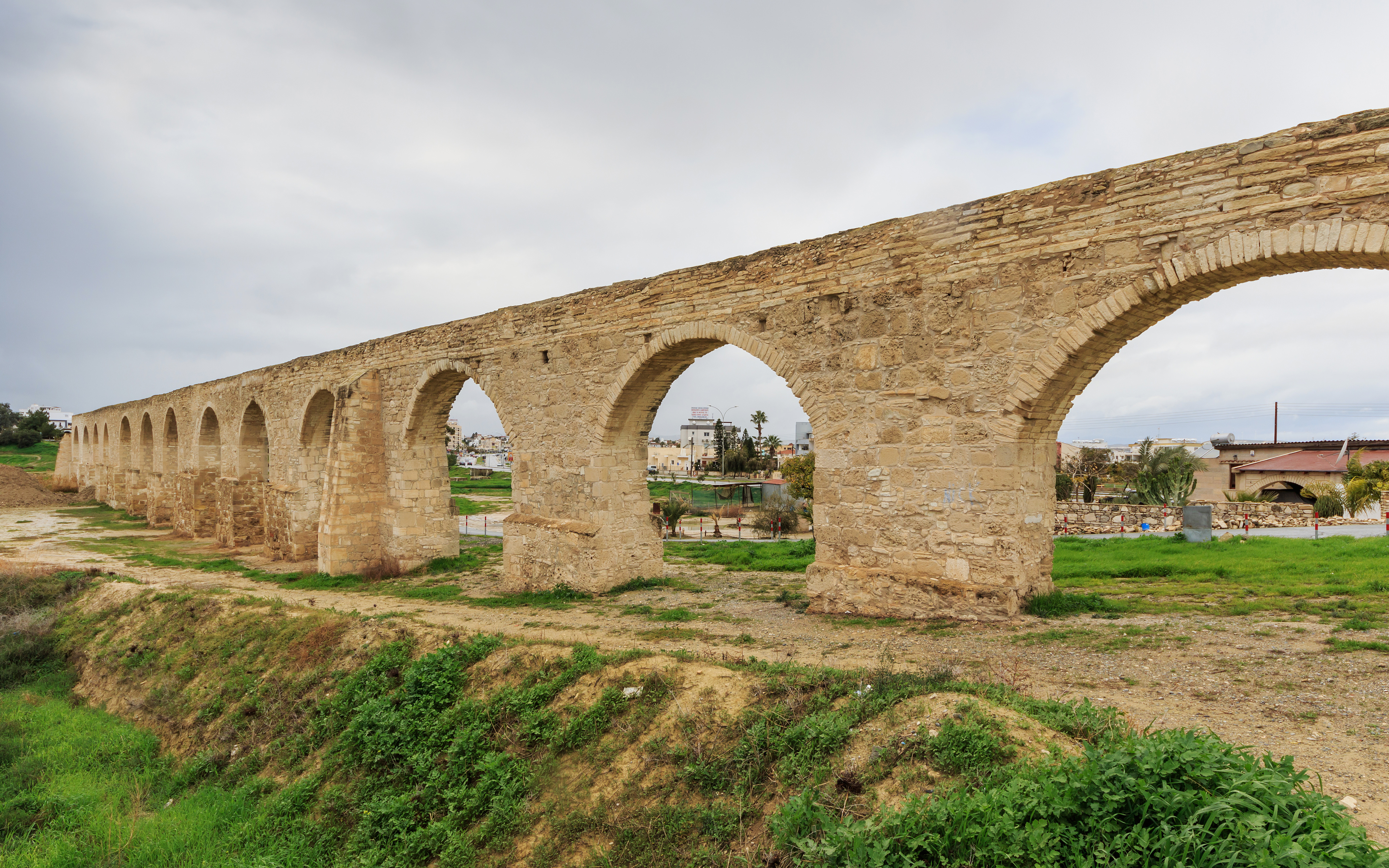
Detail of the aqueduct.

== History ==
The aqueduct was financed and built by Ebubekir Pasha (also known as Koca Bekir Pasha or Abu Bakr Pasha), the Ottoman beylerbey of Cyprus from 1747 to 1748. Observing that the poor of Larnaca were forced to carry water on their backs from sources two hours' walk from the city, he undertook the project at his own expense.

Construction began in 1747 and was completed in 1750, at a total cost of 50,000 qirsh (kuruş) paid from his personal fortune. On completion he placed the entire water supply system, together with fountains, wells, and a flour mill he had built in Larnaca and the surrounding Tuzla district, under the administration of the Ebubekir Paşa Vakfı, the waqf he established for their upkeep; its income was drawn from a farm at Arpera, mulberry gardens, and a vineyard.

Foreign travellers often counted the aqueduct as the most important monument constructed during the Ottoman period in Cyprus. In 1754, Alexander Drummond wrote:

For the honour of Bekir Paşa I must communicate an instance of the old gentlemen's public spirit. While he was Paşa of this land, in the year 1747, he formed the noble design of bringing water from the river at Arpera, and occasional springs on the road about six miles from hence, to supply the people of Larnaca, Salines and the shipping. A work worthy of great and good man, which might have cost him above fifty thousand piasters of six thousand pounds.

== Architecture and hydraulics ==
The aqueduct consists of three spans of cut stone arches, of which 75 survive today. The first span, nearest the Arpera River, originally had 50 arches; the second had 12; and the third, which carries the channel across the valley at the village of Çiftlik Paşa near Larnaca, has 31 arches (possibly 33). Between the overland spans the water passed through a long tunnel served by approximately 250 air wells.

Visiting Cyprus in 1878, the British traveller Sir Samuel Baker observed that the line wells (sıra kuyuları) along the system were sunk at successively decreasing elevations, allowing water to flow from source to Larnaca entirely by gravity.

== Later history ==
The aqueduct was restored in 1854 and again in 1876, and remained in active use until 1939. A five-year conservation project on the Çiftlik Paşa span began in 1987. The surviving arches stand outside Larnaca and are known locally as "The Kamares" ("The Arches"). They are illuminated at night.

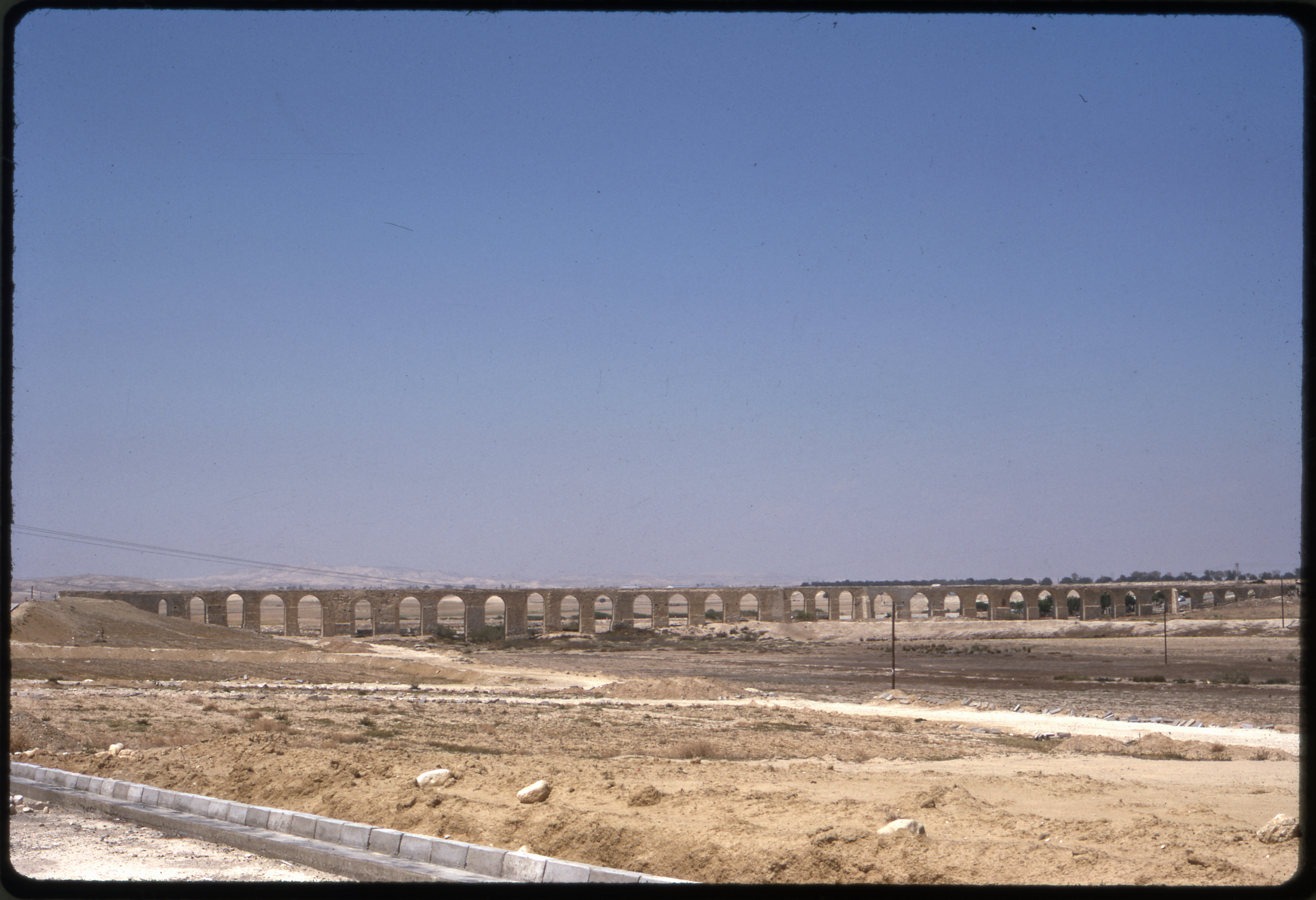
Larnaca, Cyprus, the aqueduct known as Kamares, general view in 1973 before modern developments in the area.

== Bibliography ==
- Ebubekir Pasha Aqueduct, Archnet.
- Drummond, Alexander (1754), "Travels Through Different Cities of Germany, Italy, Greece, and Several Parts of Asia etc.", in Cobham, Claude Delaval (ed.), Excerpta Cypria: Materials for a History of Cyprus, General Books LLC, ISBN 1-154-94001-2.
- Dubin, Marc; Morris, Damien (2002), The Rough Guide to Cyprus, Rough Guides, ISBN 1-85828-863-0.
- Li, H.; Duan, Zhongdong (2006), Structural Health Monitoring and Intelligent Infrastructure, Taylor & Francis, ISBN 0-415-39652-2.
- Michael, Michalis N.; Kappler, Matthias; Gavriel, Eftihios (2009), Ottoman Cyprus: A Collection of Studies on History and Culture, Otto Harrassowitz Verlag, ISBN 3-447-05899-4.
- Mikropoulos, Tassos A. (2008), Elevating and Safeguarding Culture Using Tools of the Information Society: Dusty traces of the Muslim Culture, Earthlab, ISBN 960-233-187-9.
- Tosun, Sevilay (2004), "Ebubekir Paşa ve Kıbrıs'taki İmar Faaliyetleri", Cumhuriyet University Journal of Social Sciences, 28 (2): 205–213.
- Yıldız, Netice (1996), "Aqueducts in Cyprus", Journal for Cypriot Studies (2/2): 89–111.
