= Alexander Drummond (consul) =

Scottish consul

- Died: 1769; Edinburgh
- Occupation: consul

Alexander Drummond (died 1769), was a British consul.

== Career diplomat ==
Travels through different cities, 1754

Drummond, author of Travels through the different Countries of Germany, Italy, Greece, and parts of Asia Minor, as far as the Euphrates, with an Account of what is remarkable in their present State and their Monuments of Antiquity, was the son of George Drummond of Newton, and younger brother of George Drummond, Lord Provost of Edinburgh. Of his early years there is no account. He started on his travels, via Harwich and Helvoetsluys, in May 1744, reached Venice in August and Smyrna in December that year, and Cyprus in March 1745. His observations by the way, and in excursions, made in the intervals of what appear to have been commercial pursuits, during residence in Cyprus and Asia Minor in 1745–1750, are given in his book in the form of letters, mostly addressed to his brother, and accompanied by some curious plates. In one of these excursions he reached Beer, on the Euphrates. Drummond was British consul at Aleppo during the years 1751–1758.

== Freemasonry ==
He was also a Scottish Freemason, being named Provincial Grand Master of Pour l'Orient Grand Lodge, established by the Grand Lodge of Scotland. Drummond established the first Lodge Chartered by the Grand Lodge of Scotland overseas, at Aleppo, in 1747, although the Charter was not issued formally until 8 April 1752.

== Death ==
He died at Edinburgh on 9 August 1769. A portrait of him is catalogued in Evans's 'Engraved Portraits'.
