= Abdullah Pasha ibn Ali =

Ottoman governor of Sidon Eyalet from 1820 to 1832

Wali of Sidon
- In office 27 January 1820 – June 1822
- Preceded by: Sulayman Pasha al-Adil
- Succeeded by: Darwish Mehmed Pasha
- In office April 1823 – May 1832
- Preceded by: Mustafa Pasha
- Succeeded by: Husayn Abd al-Hadi (Egyptian rule)

Katkhuda of Sulayman Pasha
- In office 1814–1819
- Preceded by: Ali Agha Khazindar

Personal details
- Born: 1801 Acre
- Died: Hejaz

Military service
- Allegiance: Ottoman Empire

Abdullah Pasha ibn Ali (commonly referred to simply as Abdullah Pasha; 1801–unknown) was the Ottoman governor (wali) of Sidon Eyalet between May 1820 and May 1832, with a nine-month interruption in 1822–23. Like his predecessors Jazzar Pasha and Sulayman Pasha, Abdullah Pasha ruled from the port city of Acre. During his reign, all of Palestine and the Syrian coastline came under his jurisdiction. Among his major military victories was his survival of an imperial-backed siege of Acre in 1822 instigated by the Farhi family in retaliation for Abdullah's execution of his mentor Haim Farhi, the suppression of revolts in Mount Lebanon and Jerusalem in 1824 and 1826, respectively, and the 1831 capture of the Sanur fortress.

While Abdullah oversaw a period of relative stability in Syria, during his reign the region also experienced economic reversals and increasing poverty, while Acre's key role as an export center of Levantine cotton and olive oil increasingly diminished. Abdullah was the last governor of Sidon to rule from Acre and his defeat to the forces of Muhammad Ali of Egypt in 1832 marked the end of Acre as a political and economic power. Following his defeat, he lived in exile in Egypt and then the Hejaz, where he died.

== Early life and career ==
Abdullah Bey (as he was known before becoming governor) was born in Acre in 1801 to Ali Pasha Khazindar, a Circassian Muslim mamluk of Jazzar Pasha (r. 1776–1804) and later the katkhuda (deputy) of Sulayman Pasha al-Adil (1805–1819). Abdullah's mother was from the coastal city of Jableh and belonged to a family of ashraf (descendants of the Islamic prophet Muhammad). Ali Pasha died in 1814, but while on his deathbed he asked Haim Farhi, Sulayman's chief adviser, to look after Abdullah, then 13. Farhi gladly accepted the responsibility and from then on lobbied for Abdullah to succeed Sulayman, who had no male heirs. Abdullah's mother also played a role in lobbying both Farhi and Sulayman to elevate her son.

Farhi sought to groom Abdullah for leadership and had him educated in Islamic law. According to Druze sheikh Bashir Jumblatt, Farhi "turned him over for his education to the fanatical shaykhs" and Abdullah "turned out more fanatical than they". Farhi, who contemporaries described as Sulayman's unofficial "partner in power", did not view young Abdullah as a threat to his influence and sought to promote him over more powerful potential successors to Sulayman such as the latter's nephew Mustafa Bey or Muhammad Abu-Nabbut of Jaffa.

Sulayman looked favourably to Abdullah's potential succession and appointed him katkhuda in his father's place, an appointment which surprised many in Sulayman's administration due to Abdullah's young age. Nonetheless, Sulayman sought to publicly downplay Abdullah's political rise by imposing certain rules on him. Among these were that Abdullah was to sit among government employees and administrators instead of having his own office like Ali Pasha had. He was forbidden from eating or drinking coffee with Sulayman and his hand was not to be kissed by anyone.

== Rule ==
=== Appointment ===
Sulayman died in August 1819. The principal domestic obstacle to Abdullah's succession had been the original mamluks of Jazzar Pasha, chief among them Abu-Nabbut. However, under Farhi's direction, Abu-Nabbut was ousted from Jaffa in 1818. According to historian Mikhail Mishaqah, "those who had loved Sulayman" beckoned Farhi to lobby the Sublime Porte (imperial Ottoman government) to appoint Mustafa Bey as successor, but Farhi retorted that Abdullah "was born in this country and we took great pains to teach him Arabic, nice handwriting and the legal sciences" and that as katkhuda he gained "experience in governing" and it would not be "right to promote over him someone whose Arabic is weak and who neither knows the legal system nor has experience in governing."

Through his Constantinople-based contact Hesekiel al-Baghdadi, a fellow Jew and a banker with close ties to the powerful Janissary corps, Farhi lobbied the Sublime Porte for five months before it agreed to appoint Abdullah Pasha as Wali of Sidon and assign him the rank of vizier. Bribes to various imperial officials and influential figures in Constantinople, the Ottoman capital, amounted to about 11 million piastres. On 27 January 1820, Abdullah was confirmed as governor of Sidon. In the interim period, Emir Bashir Shihab II of Mount Lebanon maintained order throughout the province.

The jurisdiction of the Sidon Eyalet at the time of Abdullah Pasha's appointment included the districts of Sidon, Tripoli, Latakia, Gaza, Ramla and Jaffa (essentially the Galilee, the coastal areas of Syria and Mount Lebanon. People in the province welcomed Abdullah's succession because of the perception that he would follow Sulayman's model, which had been generally positive for both the inhabitants and local leaders.

=== Tensions with Farhi ===
Abdullah continued to maintain his trustful relationship with Farhi, to the point where he stored the treasury in Farhi's home. Farhi continued to wield great influence over Acre-based administration. According to Mishaqah, Abdullah often spent his time with local, lower-class Muslims and joined them in dhikr sessions (Sufi ritual of remembrance involving dancing). Farhi disapproved of Abdullah's behavior and advised him to instead participate in dhikrs with men of higher social rank, such as the qadi, the mufti, the naqib al-ashraf or members of the ulema.

Abdullah ignored Farhi's advice and informed his friends of Farhi's statements. His friends included Sheikh Mas'ud al-Madi, the Arab mutasallim (tax enforcer) of the Atlit coast who had a sour relationship with Farhi, Sheikh Mustafa, Abdullah's personal imam, Muhammad Effendi Abu al-Huda, Acre's newly appointed qadi. They feared Farhi could displace them from their new-found positions of influence with the governor. According to Mishaqah, They accused Farhi of being an "arrogant Jew" who manipulated his way into power, controlled the province's wealth from his own home, and questioned how a Jew could be allowed to govern in the interests of Muslims. Moreover, they told Abdullah that Sulayman could be forgiven for allowing Farhi to become influential because Sulayman was not versed in Islamic law, but that Abdullah did not have that excuse, claiming that the imams of Islam's four main schools of jurisprudence forbade a Jew from holding office in charge of Muslims.

Abdullah Pasha adhered to the concerns of his newly formed inner circle and subsequently ordered Farhi to move the treasury into Acre's government house, which Farhi did. He then dismissed Farhi as chief scribe and appointed Yusuf Qardahi, a Maronite from Sidon, in his place. After these demotions, Farhi requested to retire to Damascus, but Abdullah did not allow it, viewing Farhi's presence in Damascus as a potential threat to his rule. Al-Madi and Umar Effendi al-Baghdadi, a local official, convinced Abdullah that as long as Farhi was alive he would pose a threat to Abdullah's rule through the same influential Jewish contacts with the Sublime Porte that got Abdullah appointed in the first place.

According to the French consul in Acre, Abdullah and Farhi entered into a scathing argument in which Farhi reminded Abdullah that he was the reason Abdullah was appointed governor. According to historian Thomas Philipp, the argument was "the final straw" which pushed Abdullah to have Farhi executed. On that same night, 8 August 1820, Abdullah ordered his brother-in-law Ibrahim Bey al-Jarkasi and a few of his soldiers to kill Farhi. Al-Jarkasi's men entered Farhi's home, strangled him to death and threw his body into the Mediterranean Sea. According to Mishaqah, Farhi's death was mourned by "all intelligent people in the province, regardless of their religion", as they viewed him to be "a wise administrator". Qardahi, another non-Muslim, assumed Farhi's duties, after Musa Farhi refused Abdullah's offer of succeeding his brother. According to Philipp, this confirmed that Farhi's elimination was the result of a power struggle rather than religious reasons.

=== Relations with Emir Bashir ===
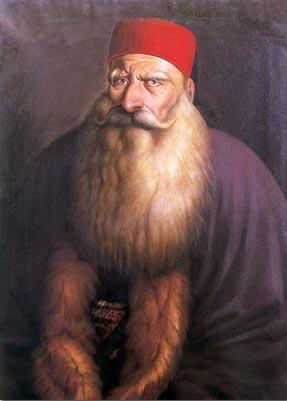
Portrait of Emir Bashir Shihab II. Abdullah Pasha entered into a long-term alliance with Emir Bashir.

Early in his rule, Abdullah made frequent demands from Emir Bashir II to pay tribute in the form of cash, jewellery or horses, to which Bashir II initially complied. However, within a short time Bashir II became either unable or unwilling to make the payments. In order to maintain cordial and stable relations with Acre, Bashir II dispatched one of his Melkite advisers, Butrus Karami, to smooth over ties with Abdullah, who was suspicious of Bashir's loyalties i.e. whether he was a Muslim or a Christian. Abdullah ultimately deposed Bashir for his failure to pay tribute and the latter exiled himself to the Hauran region south of Damascus. Two other, apparently Muslim, emirs from the Shihab dynasty, Emir Hasan ibn Ali and Emir Salman ibn Sayyid-Ahmad, were appointed to replace Bashir II in Mount Lebanon, although Abdullah detached the areas of Tuffah, Kharrub, Jezzine, Byblos and Jabal al-Rihan from the latter.

Bashir's successors proved less capable of paying tribute than Bashir. From the Hauran, Emir Bashir issued a request to Abdullah for intervention or assistance regarding a payment of 5,000 piastres imposed on him by the Ottoman governor of Damascus, Darwish Pasha. Abdullah responded favourably, writing that Bashir "will not see from me other than what will gladden him" and summoned him to Shefa-'Amr, a village in Acre's vicinity. Soon after, Abdullah restored the Mount Lebanon Emirate, including the detached areas (except for Byblos), to Bashir. The two formed a military alliance in 1821 against Darwish Pasha.

=== Conflict with Damascus ===
In retaliation against Farhi's execution, influential members of the Farhi family in Damascus and Istanbul, instigated the Ottoman authorities against Abdullah Pasha. In early 1822, armed confrontations between the forces of the Damascus Eyalet under governor Darwish Pasha and Abdullah's forces over territorial claims in the Golan Heights, Nablus and the Beqaa Valley occurred frequently. Darwish Pasha's actions were being instigated by the Farhi family and Abdullah sought support from Emir Bashir, writing to him that "the Jews have conspired with the Empire against him" and that the imperial authorities were attempting to dismiss Abdullah from the governorship of Sidon, which would then be annexed by Damascus Eyalet. Emir Bashir answered his summons to Acre, where Abdullah's mother told him "My son is your lord by virtue of his rank, but in view of age and your efforts on his behalf you are his son" and proceeded to concede that Abdullah had acted rashly with Bashir in the past and that he erred in having Farhi killed. Bashir replied that he would continue to serve Abdullah and fight in his service.

After meeting with Abdullah, the latter asked Bashir to mobilize his forces and meet Abdullah's troops at the Daughters of Jacob Bridge. From there, the coalition was to move against Darwish Pasha in Damascus. Emir Bashir and his allies mustered some 12,000 fighting men, while Abdullah's forces numbered 4,000 under the command of Ibrahim Agha al-Kurdi. Darwish Pasha's troops, backed by the Druze Yazbaki faction and Emir Mansur Shihab II assembled at Mezzeh outside of Damascus, where the two sides confronted each other in May 1822. Darwish Pasha's cannons in Mezzeh gave him an initial advantage over Abdullah's coalition, but once the latter's cavalry charged against the town, the battle turned into a rout for Darwish's men, 1,200 of whom were killed. Forty soldiers from Abdullah's coalition died in the battle.

Abdullah's forces besieged Damascus, but did not enter it, preferring to use the siege to leverage support from Mustafa Pasha, the governor of Aleppo. Abdullah had been previously warned that Mustafa Pasha and Bahram Pasha of Adana were given orders to support Darwish Pasha. As a result of the Farhis of Istanbul mobilizing support for Darwish Pasha, the Sublime Porte issued orders for Mustafa Pasha to reinforce Darwish, and a firman branding Abdullah as a rebel and dismissing him from the governorship of Sidon, which was then transferred to Darwish Pasha's jurisdiction. Emir Bashir, seeking to avoid the quandary of being disloyal towards Abdullah or defying Ottoman imperial orders, fled Syria for Egypt which was governed by the powerful Muhammad Ali. The siege of Damascus was consequently lifted and Abdullah's forces retreated to Acre to reinforce his hold over the city.

Abdullah sought intervention on his behalf by Muhammad Ali, who had been supporting the Ottomans against Greek rebels in Morea. Darwish Pasha, sought to gain actual control of Sidon Eyalet before Abdullah and Emir Bashir could regroup, and besieged Acre in July 1822. Mustafa Pasha and Bahram Pasha backed the siege with their forces. Abdullah's forces numbered around 2,000, consisting of his personal guard, a number of professional soldiers, and Arab and Turkish irregulars. The siege was supported financially by Salamun Farhi of Damascus, who was present in Darwish Pasha's camp outside of Acre. After five months of no tangible results from the siege, Darwish Pasha was dismissed from the governorship of Sidon and replaced by Mustafa Pasha.

=== Restoration to the governorship ===
In April 1823, Muhammad Ali successfully intervened to have Abdullah pardoned and restored to the governorship and the siege was lifted. Mustafa Pasha was dismissed and ordered back to Aleppo. Both Abdullah and Mustafa Pasha accused the Farhi family of being the main party responsible for the war against Abdullah, with Mustafa Pasha producing documents to back his allegations. Coinciding with these accusations, the Ottoman authorities under Sultan Mahmud II's direction, began a process to reduce and ultimately destroy the Janissary corps, an influential military group that the Farhis and their associates had developed strong ties with. Salamun Farhi died sometime during the siege, while Hesekiel al-Baghdadi and his brother Ezra were executed in May 1823. The restoration of Abdullah to the governorship represented not only a success for Muhammad Ali, but also a shift in the sultanate's policy toward some Jewish financiers in the empire.

The Sublime Porte issued a demand for Abdullah to pay a fine of 25,000 purses to compensate for the expenses of the siege, and detached the districts of Tripoli, Latakia, Gaza and Jaffa from Sidon Eyalet until Abdullah made the payment. Abdullah had exhausted his financial resources during the siege and decided to impose the entire fine on Sheikh Bashir Jumblatt of the Shuf in Mount Lebanon as a punitive measure for defecting from Abdullah's coalition during Darwish Pasha's campaign. Emir Bashir intervened so that Sheikh Bashir would only pay a third of the fine, while Emir Bashir and his subjects would make up the remainder. In 1824, the Sublime Porte restored the districts of Gaza and Jaffa to Abdullah's jurisdiction.

Although Abdullah had been restored to power, Acre's former political, military and economic dominance in Syria had been significantly reduced, with Emir Bashir of Mount Lebanon emerging as a major power in his own right and Muhammad Ali of Egypt carving out an influential role in the region's politics. Acre, nonetheless, maintained its superiority over the other administrative centers of Syria.

In 1824, Sheikh Jumblatt launched a revolt against Abdullah from his headquarters at Mukhtara in Shuf. Abdullah and Emir Bashir mobilized against him. After three battles in the Shuf, the last one being a counter attack by Jumblatt in 1825 and involving the entire forces of each side, Jumblatt fled the area. He was pursued, arrested and sent to Abdullah Pasha in Acre. Abdullah ordered Jumblatt's execution and the latter was strangled in his jail cell. The elimination of Jumblatt, who had grown wealthier and more influential than Emir Bashir, further strengthened Emir Bashir's control in Mount Lebanon.

In 1826, Abdullah was commissioned by the Sublime Porte to suppress a revolt in Jerusalem, which began in 1825, and bring order to the city. At the time, Jerusalem was outside of Abdullah's jurisdiction, being part of Damascus Eyalet, but the governor of Damascus, Mustafa Pasha, was unable to quell the rebellion. The rebels had ousted Jerusalem's mutasallim and controlled the city. Abdullah managed to restore the government's authority in Jerusalem with little blood being shed.

During the period in which Tripoli and its dependencies were detached from Sidon Eyalet, Abdullah Pasha continued to wield influence in its affairs. The district was governed by Sulayman Bey al-Azm, but when the latter departed to guard the Hajj caravan in 1824, a revolt occurred in the city against the district's caretaker governor, Husayn Bey al-Azm. It was led by partisans of Tripoli's former mutasallim, Mustafa Agha Barbar. Abdullah intervened and demanded that Barbar, who was then based in Beirut, cease inciting his partisans, to which Barbar complied. Sulayman died in Tripoli shortly after returning from the Hajj. He was replaced by Ali Agha al-As'ad of Akkar, a loyalist of Abdullah. In 1827, the Sublime Porte restored Tripoli to Abdullah's jurisdiction because the authorities believed Abdullah could restore stability in the unruly district. Abdullah subsequently replaced Ali Agha with Barbar.

=== Siege of Sanur ===
In October 1830, the Sublime Porte assigned the districts of Jerusalem, Nablus and Hebron to Abdullah Pasha's jurisdiction. The districts were traditionally part of Damascus Eyalet, but the latter's governor, Mehmed Pasha, had been unable to collect the miri (annual tax designated for the Hajj pilgrimage caravan) from them. The Ottomans also feared an imminent invasion of Syria by Muhammad Ali and viewed Acre, however weakened, as the sole power centre that could confront such an invasion. Thus, the imperial authorities sought to strengthen Abdullah's political position.

Abdullah's authority over Jabal Nablus, a mountainous region whose rural sheikhs had ruled with virtual autonomy from Damascus, put him into confrontation with the Jarrar family, the most powerful rural family of the district. The Jarrar sheikhs rejected Abdullah's authority over their affairs. From their fortress in Sanur, the Jarrar clan had successfully resisted sieges by Abdullah's predecessors Zahir al-Umar and Jazzar Pasha, as well as from various governors of Damascus. Abdullah believed that by defeating the Jarrars and capturing their fortress, he would be considered "next to that of the greatest commanders of the world", according to the French consul in Beirut.

Abdullah's forces, backed by Emir Bashir, besieged Sanur in December 1830. After three months of stiff resistance, the fortress fell in March 1831 and Sanur's defenders surrendered, or fled. The siege was financially costly for Abdullah in terms of ammunition and artillery shells. Abdullah proceeded to have the fortress destroyed. After his victory, Abdullah opted to reconcile with the sheikhs of Jabal Nablus because an impending invasion of Syria by Muhammad Ali had become apparent.

=== Fall ===
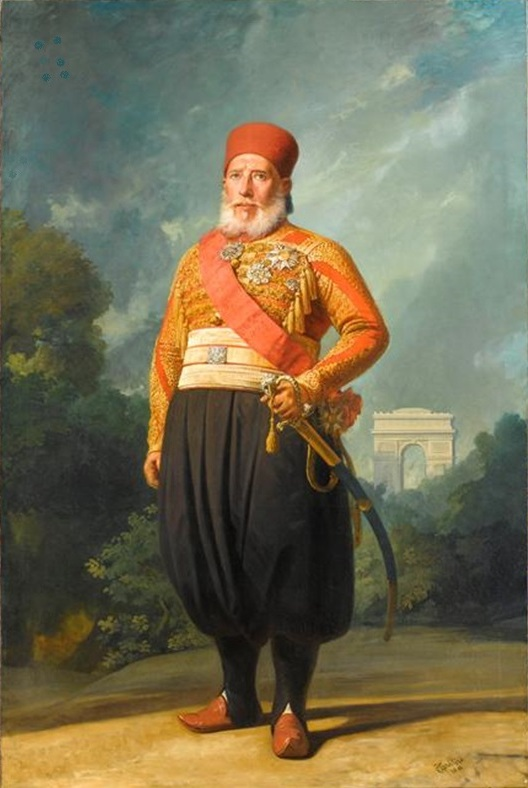
Ibrahim Pasha of Egypt led the 1831–32 siege against Abdullah in Acre, which led to his surrender and exile from the city.

In November 1831, Muhammad Ali, who had long demanded control of Syria as compensation for his assistance to the Ottomans in their war with the Greeks, launched an invasion of Syria under the command of his son Ibrahim Pasha. As a public justification of his conquest of Sidon, Muhammad Ali alleged that Abdullah was harboring 6,000 Egyptian fellahin who were dodging conscription, corvee or taxes. Ibrahim Pasha's troops faced no resistance as they entered Palestine, easily taking Gaza and Jaffa. Abdullah Pasha rushed to have Acre's defences prepared. Meanwhile, Husayn Abd al-Hadi of Arraba, a prominent sheikh of Jabal Nablus, was advised by Emir Bashir to not resist Ibrahim Pasha's troops. When Ibrahim landed in Syria, Emir Bashir defected from his alliance with Abdullah and backed Ibrahim Pasha, and Abdullah accused Bashir of being "a treacherous and ungrateful infidel".

The siege of Acre began in December 1831 after Ibrahim's army captured the nearby port town of Haifa, where Abdullah maintained a summer residence. Ibrahim's forces, backed by Emir Bashir's men, bombarded Acre for several months, inflicting a significant toll on Abdullah's forces. On 29 May 1832, Ibrahim Pasha rallied his troops and intensified the artillery barrage on Acre's walls from all sides. The exterior wall was breached during a charge by Egyptian and Maronite cavalry who then engaged the city's defenders. Abdullah had been seeking safety with his family in a bunker in the city, but when he realized that the exterior walls were breached and that his remaining defenders amounted to no more than 350 men, he conceded defeat and opened Acre's gates. Ibrahim Pasha's army subsequently plundered the city, but Abdullah was treated with respect.

After his surrender, Abdullah was sent to Egypt where he was warmly welcomed by his erstwhile ally Muhammad Ali. The latter issued Abdullah the monthly pension that he was officially entitled to as a vizier. Abdullah remained in Egypt for a period of time, but eventually requested that he be allowed to retire to the Hejaz, a request which Muhammad Ali granted. Abdullah died in the Hejaz. His defeat in Acre marked the end of that city's semi-autonomy within the empire and its political influence in the region.

== Politics ==
Abdullah rid his administration of nearly all of Sulayman Pasha's confidants because he viewed them as potential threats to his rule. The main threats he perceived were Farhi, who he had killed early in his rule, and the older mamluks who had formed part of Sulayman's trusted retinue. He replaced most of the latter, particularly those who had been close to Muhammad Abu-Nabbut, with younger mamluks. They were give pensions as part of their dismissals from mutasallim posts throughout Sidon Eyalet. An example of Abdullah's tendency to rely on young administrators was the replacement of Nazreth's mutasallim with the 17-year-old Salim Agha. By the end of Abdullah's rule, none of his military commanders were mamluks.

Not much is known about Abdullah's military forces. However, it is known that they generally consisted of Arab Hawwara irregulars, Kurdish Dalat cavalry irregulars and Maghrebi mercenaries. By the time of Acre's 1831–32 siege, Husayn Agha and Hamadi Agha were the commanders of the Hawwara, Shamdin Agha (a sole leftover of Sulayman's administration) was commander of the Dalat cavalry, and Ali Agha Farahat was the commander of the Maghrebi mercenaries. The general estimate of Abdullah's troop numbers was about 2,000 fighting men, although at times the number could have been higher. For instance, in 1824 his standing army consisted of 3,000 men, mostly Hawwara irregulars, as well as Dalat, Maghrebi and Albanian units. Abdullah often relied on the military support of the Druze clans and Emir Bashir's forces from Mount Lebanon and possibly the Shia Muslim clans of Jabal Amil.

Abdullah's expenditures were paid directly from Acre's treasury. In order to make up for declining revenues, Abdullah reversed the free market trend set under Sulayman Pasha by extending Acre's monopoly on Syria's cotton exports to imports coming into Acre as well. These policies resulted in Acre being bypassed by merchants and traders, with cotton from Nablus being shipped to Beirut instead. The French consul also relocated to Beirut, which was prospering at Acre's expense. In a report, the French consul wrote that Abdullah "governs as if politics advised him to surround himself with ruins, to the point that all the country under his control presents a picture of isolation and poverty." According to Philipp, "only the instability of politics in Damascus ... and the preoccupation of the Ottomans with internal reforms and the Greek war disguised the weakness of Abdallah Pasha's regime".

== Bibliography ==
- Dixon, Jeffrey S.; Sarkees, Meredith Reed (2015). "Sidon-Damascus War of 1821 to 1822". A Guide to Intra-state Wars: An Examination of Civil, Regional, and Intercommunal Wars, 1816–2014. CQ Press. ISBN 9781506317984.
- Douwes, Dick (2000). Ottomans in Syria: A History of Justice and Oppression. I.B.Tauris. ISBN 9780857715418.
- Finn, James (1910). "XXIV". Quarterly Statement. Palestine Exploration Fund. p. 123.
- Mengin, M. Felix (1840). "The Eastern Questions: Turkey, Egypt, France, Russia and Asia, and the British Ministry". The Foreign Quarterly Review. 24. Black and Armstrong: 402–403.
- Mishaqah, Mikha'il (1988). William McIntosh Thackston (ed.). Murder, Mayhem, Pillage, and Plunder: The History of the Lebanon in the 18th and 19th Centuries by Mikhayil Mishaqa (1800–1873). SUNY Press. ISBN 9780887067129.
- Harris, William (2012). Lebanon: A History, 600–2011. OUP USA. ISBN 9780195181111.
- Johnson, Michael (2001). All Honourable Men: The Social Origins of War in Lebanon. I.B.Tauris. ISBN 9781860647154.
- Makdisi, U.S. (2000). The Culture of Sectarianism: Community, History, and Violence in Nineteenth-Century Ottoman Lebanon. University of California Press. ISBN 9780520922792.
- Petry, Carl F. (1998). The Cambridge History of Egypt, Volume 2. Cambridge University Press. ISBN 9780521472111.
- Mattar, Phillip (2005). Encyclopedia of the Palestinians. Infobase Publishing. ISBN 9780816069866.
- Philipp, Thomas (2013). Acre: The Rise and Fall of a Palestinian City, 1730–1831. Columbia University Press. ISBN 9780231506038.
- Winter, Michael (2004). The Mamluks in Egyptian and Syrian Politics and Society. BRILL. ISBN 9789004132863.
- Yazbak, Mahmoud (1998). Haifa in the Late Ottoman Period, A Muslim Town in Transition, 1864–1914. Brill Academic Pub. ISBN 90-04-11051-8.
