= Shamdin Agha =

Kurdish Ottoman paramilitary chieftain (died 1860)

Shamdin Agha Agha
- Born: Acre, Sidon Eyalet, Ottoman Empire
- Died: 1860; Damascus, Damascus Eyalet, Ottoman Empire
- Relatives: Muhammad Sa'id (son)
- Military career
- Allegiance: Ottoman Empire
- Service years: 1807–1857
- Rank: Captain of the Dalat Cavalry
- Unit: Dalat Cavalry

Shamdin Agha (also known as Shamlin Agha; died 1860) was an Ottoman Kurdish commander of irregulars in the service of the Ottoman governors of Damascus and Sidon Eyalet. In effect, he was powerful paramilitary chieftain in Damascus. His descendants became a prominent family with his namesake, Shamdin, in Ottoman Syria.

== Biography ==
Shamdin was born in Acre to a Kurdish tribal sheikh named Musa. In the early 19th century, he moved to the al-Salihiyah suburb of Damascus. There, he built a power base from Kurdish immigrants and was assigned as the commander of a military garrison in the city, in the service of the Kurdish Wali of Damascus, Kunj Yusuf Pasha. When Sulayman Pasha al-Adil of Acre became Wali of Damascus, Shamdin continued to serve as the commander of the Kurdish cavalry battalion, known as the Dalat. He was one of three of Sulayman Pasha's Kurdish cavalry officers, the other two being Ni'mat Agha and Ayalyaqin Agha.

Sulayman Pasha died in 1819 and was succeeded by his deputy Abdullah Pasha ibn Ali. Shamdin Agha was the only commander from Sulayman's service to continue serving under Abdullah (r. 1820–1831). During the 1820s, the Damascus provincial authorities assigned Shamdin control over certain rural districts in the Damascus Eyalet, including the Beqaa Valley.

When Muhammad Ali of Egypt's forces conquered Damascus (1831–1840), Shamdin maintained his loyalty to the Ottomans and was thanked by Sultan Abdülmecid I. In 1857, the Ottoman authorities tasked him with eliminating another commander of irregulars, Aqil Agha, the semi-autonomous Bedouin chieftain of the Galilee. Shamdin's forces were decisively defeated by Aqil and his men at the Horns of Hattin. He lost his post as garrison commander when the local garrisons were abolished in Damascus by the Ottoman authorities as part of their Tanzimat centralization and modernization efforts. However, his son Muhammad Sa'id became the commander of the new centralized garrison in the city.

== Bibliography ==
- Khoury, Phillip S. (2003). Urban Notables and Arab Nationalism: The Politics of Damascus 1860-1920. Cambridge University Press. ISBN 9780521533232.
- Mishaqah, Mikha'il (1988). William McIntosh Thackston (ed.). Murder, Mayhem, Pillage, and Plunder: The History of the Lebanon in the 18th and 19th Centuries by Mikhayil Mishaqa (1800-1873). SUNY Press. ISBN 9780887067129.
- Schilcher, Linda Schatkowski (1985). Families in Politics: Damascene Factions and Estates of the 18th and 19th Centuries. F. Steiner. ISBN 9783515031462.
- Winter, Michael (2004). The Mamluks in Egyptian and Syrian Politics and Society. BRILL. ISBN 9789004132863.
