= Husayn Abd al-Hadi =

Head of Abd al-Hadi clan of Arraba, Palestine (died 1835/36)

Mudir of Sidon
- In office Late-1833 or early-1834 – 1835 or 1836
- Preceded by: Abdullah Pasha
- Succeeded by: Sulayman Husayn Abd al-Hadi

Personal details
- Born: Arraba
- Died: 1835–1836 (1251 AH)
- Resting place: Acre

Military service
- Allegiance: Ottoman Empire

Husayn Abd al-Hadi (given name also spelled Husain or Hussein; surname also spelled Abdul Hadi, also named Husain Bek) (died 1835–36) was a sheikh of the Jabal Nablus region, head of the Abd al-Hadi clan of Arraba and a deputy of Ibrahim Pasha in Palestine. During Ibrahim Pasha's rule, he also served as the governor of Sidon Eyalet.

== Biography ==
In the first days of the Egyptian conquest of Ottoman Syria, Husayn Abd al-Hadi welcomed the Egyptian commander Ibrahim Pasha after first coordinating a response to the conquest with Emir Bashir Shihab II of Mount Lebanon. He accompanied Ibrahim Pasha in his siege of Acre, where the Wali of Sidon Eyalet, Abdullah Pasha was holding out. Ibrahim viewed the Abd al-Hadi family as a rising star among the rural nobility of Jabal Nablus and selected Husayn, the head of the clan, to be his deputy in Palestine, while Acre was still under siege. Acre capitulated in May 1832. The elevation of a member of the Abd al-Hadi clan came at the expense of the Tuqan family's traditional and influential position in Jabal Nablus. Ibrahim Pasha spent most of his time in other parts of Syria and Husayn administered Palestine on his behalf.

During the 1834 peasants' revolt in Palestine, Husayn supported Ibrahim Pasha. The revolt was suppressed by the end of the year and Husayn was rewarded for his loyalty and effective service by being promoted to Mudir of Sidon Eyalet, which included all of Palestine. He may have been assigned the post prior to the revolt, in late 1833. In October 1834, shortly after the execution of the main rebel leader of the revolt, Qasim al-Ahmad, Husayn purchased both his home and soap factory in Nablus, where he relocated from his home village of Arraba. Soap was a major source of revenue in the city and owning factories represented power and wealth. Shaykh Yusef Qadri of Ya'bad served as Husayn's principal agent in Nablus, helped him acquire numerous prime commercial properties there and partnered with him in many of those investments.

Husayn served as Mudir of Sidon until his death in 1835 or 1836 (1251 AH). He is buried in the courtyard of the Zaytuna Mosque in Acre. A number of Husayn's sons also owned factories or served various administrative or political offices, including Sulayman (who succeeded his father as Wali), Mahmud, Muhammad and Abd ar-Rahman.

== Bibliography ==
- Doumani, Beshara (1995). Rediscovering Palestine: Merchants and Peasants in Jabal Nablus, 1700-1900. University of California Press. ISBN 0-520-20370-4.
- Krämer, Gudrun (2011). A History of Palestine: From the Ottoman Conquest to the Founding of the State of Israel. Princeton University Press. ISBN 9780691150079.
- Mishaqah, Mikha'il (1988). William McIntosh Thackston (ed.). Murder, Mayhem, Pillage, and Plunder: The History of the Lebanon in the 18th and 19th Centuries by Mikhayil Mishaqa (1800–1873). SUNY Press. ISBN 9780887067129.
- Rustum, Asad (1938). The Royal Archives of Egypt and the Disturbances in Palestine, 1834. American University of Beirut Press.
- Sharon, Moshe (1997). Corpus Inscriptionum Arabicarum Palaestinae (CIAP).: A. Volume 1. Brill. ISBN 9004108335.
- Yazbak, Mahmoud (1998). Haifa in the Late Ottoman Period, A Muslim Town in Transition, 1864–1914. Brill Academic Pub. ISBN 90-04-11051-8.
