= Iaal Fortress =

Lebanese castle

Coordinates: 34°21′44″N 35°54′40″E

Iaal Fortress (Arabic: قلعة إيعال, romanized: Qalʿa ʾIʿāl), also known as Mustafa Barbar Agha Fortress (Arabic: قلعة مصطفى بربر آغا, romanized: Qalʿa Muṣṭafā Barbar ʾĀghā), is a defensive castle located in Iaal in the Zgharta District of the North Governorate of Lebanon.

== History ==
Built in 1816 by the Ottoman Governor of Tripoli Mustafa Agha Barbar, it sits on a hill overlooking a panoramic view. Barbar was appointed Governor of Tripoli by the Ottomans in 1798. He built his castle here because of the strategic location.

Visitors arrive at the castle by taking a set of steps which bring them to a front entrance guarded by a wooden door covered with metal studs. Within the 5,000 square meters of the castle walls are stables, wells, sleeping quarters and reservoirs. The court has a central basin called 'birket as-sbaa' (in Arabic) or 'basin of the lions', named for the lions carved on the stone. There are also small rooms around the courtyard which served as bathrooms and bedrooms in the old days. A stone staircase leads to a serial, where Barbar had his office. Nearby were the women's rooms.

The castle has lost most of its roof, except for the section where some of Barbar's modern descendants are now living. Behind the fortress a small graveyard holds the tombs of Barbar and his family. There is also a mosque and some old barracks in this part of the castle grounds.

Iaal Fortress can be reached by going through Zgharta and turning left towards the town of Khaldieh. Iaal village, with its population of about 1,000 people, is only 6 km from Zgharta.

== See also ==
- List of castles in Lebanon
