= Sulayman Pasha al-Adil =

Ottoman governor of Sidon Eyalet from 1805 to 1819

Wali of Sidon
- In office 1805–1819
- Preceded by: Jazzar Pasha
- Succeeded by: Abdullah Pasha ibn Ali

Wali of Damascus
- In office 1810–1812
- Preceded by: Kunj Yusuf Pasha
- Succeeded by: Silahdar Süleyman Pasha

Mutasallim of Sidon
- In office Late 1780s – 1789

Wali of Tripoli
- In office 1785 – Late 1780s
- Preceded by: Mikdad Pasha
- Succeeded by: Mustafa Agha Barbar (as mutasallim)

Personal details
- Born: c. 1760s
- Died: August 1819 Acre, Sidon Eyalet, Ottoman Empire

Military service
- Allegiance: Ottoman Empire

Sulayman Pasha al-Adil (c. 1760s – August 1819; given name also spelled Suleiman or Sulaiman) was the Ottoman governor of Sidon Eyalet between 1805 and 1819, ruling from his Acre headquarters. He also simultaneously served as governor of Damascus Eyalet between 1810 and 1812. He was a mamluk of his predecessor, Jazzar Pasha. His rule was associated with decentralization, a reduction of Acre's military, and limits to his predecessors' cotton monopoly. Moreover, he oversaw a policy of non-interference with his deputy governors, such as Muhammad Abu-Nabbut and Mustafa Agha Barbar, and diplomacy with the autonomous sheikhs of the various Levantine regions where he held authority, including Emir Bashir Shihab II and Musa Bey Tuqan. He exercised control over his domain largely through depending on the loyalty of his deputies, who also had been mamluks of Jazzar. In effect, Sulayman Pasha presided over the world's last functioning mamluk system.

== Mamluk of Jazzar ==
Sulayman Pasha was of Georgian origin and was likely born in the early 1760s. He was purchased as a mamluk (slave soldier) by Jazzar Pasha either while the latter was in Egypt or in his first years in Syria in the 1770s. He became a member of Jazzar's inner circle, which was composed of other mamluks including Ali Agha Khazindar, Salim Pasha al-Kabir (died in 1786) and Salim Pasha al-Saghir. When Jazzar was appointed wali (governor) of Damascus in 1785, the Sublime Porte also appointed Mikdad Pasha as wali of Tripoli. Jazzar then lobbied to replace the latter with Sulayman, who was appointed later that year. Sometime afterward, Sulayman was appointed by Jazzar as the mutasallim (tax farmer and enforcer) of Sidon.

Sulayman took part in the mamluk rebellion against Jazzar in 1789, allowing Sidon to be used as a headquarters for the rebellion. On 3 June, Sulayman and Salim Pasha al-Saghir, with some 1,200 of their troops, attempted to capture Acre from Jazzar. On the plains outside of the city, a battle was fought, although cannon fire from Acre's artillery forced Sulayman's troops to disperse. Sulayman and Salim fled to Mount Lebanon and from there to Damascus in a bid to raise a new army. The revolt personally offended Jazzar since he treated Sulayman and Salim deferentially, guaranteed their careers and enabled them to grow wealthy. In 1801, Sulayman reestablished ties with Jazzar, who welcomed his return warmly, treating him "like a lost son", according to historian Michael Winter.

Jazzar died in April–May 1804 while Sulayman was commanding the Hajj pilgrim caravan to Mecca on Jazzar's behalf (Jazzar was too sick to fulfill his duties as amir al-hajj). The Sublime Porte appointed Ibrahim Pasha Qataraghasi as Jazzar's replacement as the wali of Sidon and Damascus. However, Isma'il, an officer imprisoned by Jazzar, was freed from incarceration and assumed control over Acre in defiance of the Sublime Porte. Ibrahim besieged Acre beginning around June and was joined by Sulayman on his return from the Hajj. Ibrahim withdrew from the siege to make preparations for the next Hajj caravan scheduled in January 1805 and left Sulayman in command of the siege. In 1805, the Sublime Porte subsequently appointed Sulayman wali of Sidon to further motivate him to continue the siege. Later that year or in early 1806, Sulayman Pasha's forces defeated Isma'il when the latter attempted to lead a sortie from Acre against Sulayman's camp near Shefa-'Amr.

== Ruler of Acre ==
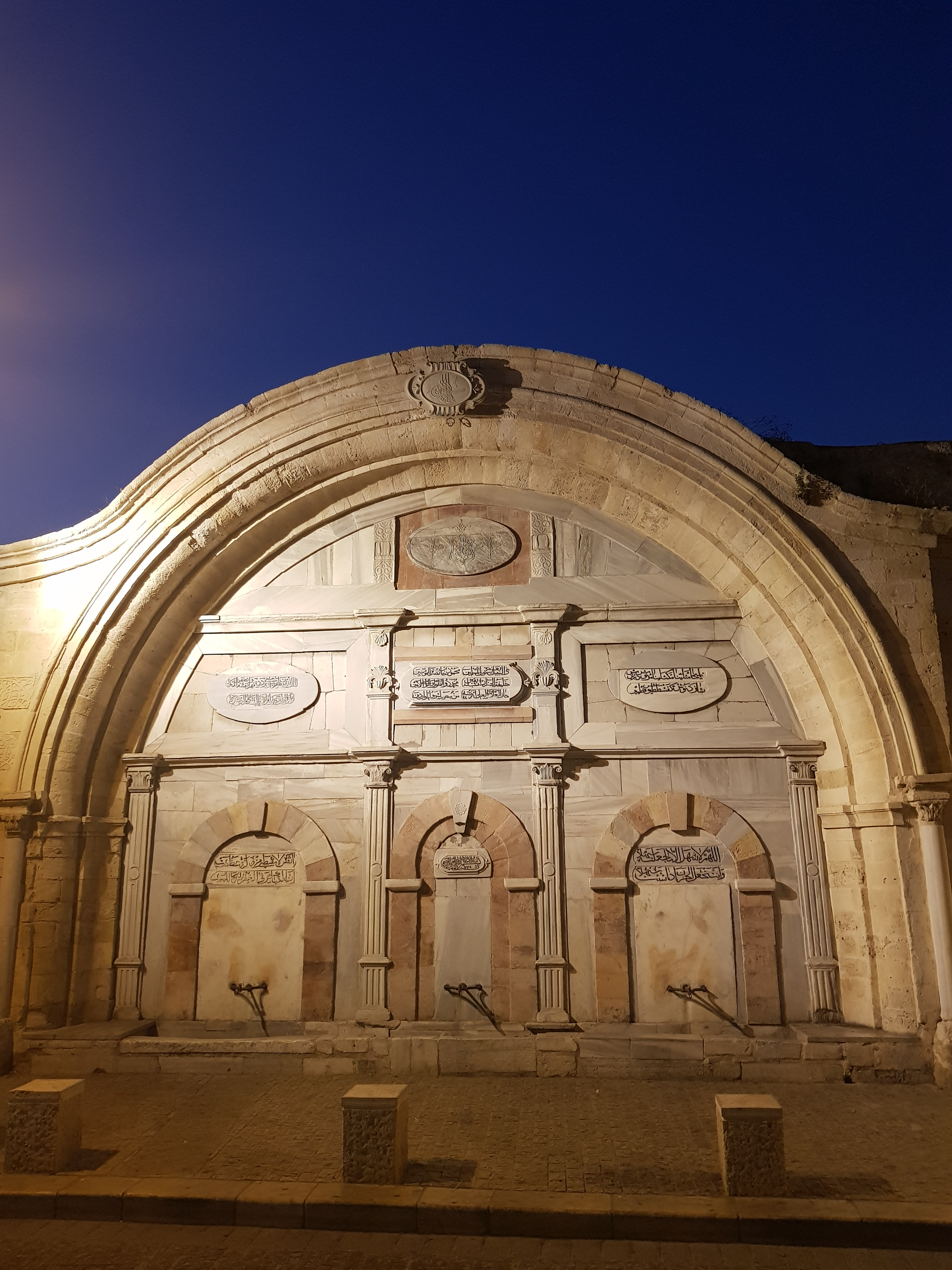
Sebil in Jaffa

As the Acre-based wali of Sidon, Sulayman proceeded to re-establish Jazzar's mamluk household, which had disintegrated during the 1789 rebellion. Among the most prominent of the mamluks was Ali Pasha (formerly Ali Agha) and Muhammad Abu-Nabbut. One of Sulayman's first actions as governor was ousting Muhammad Abu Marraq, the governor of Gaza and Jaffa. Abu Marraq had provoked the ire of the Sublime Porte by failing to carry out imperial orders to march against Wahhabi tribesmen invading the southern Syrian Desert regions. Consequently, the Sublime Porte commissioned Sulayman to forcibly remove him from office. Sulayman dispatched Abu-Nabbut to capture Jaffa, which he did, after a siege lasting until the second half of 1806, forcing Abu Marraq to flee.

Sulayman's victory further elevated his standing with the Sublime Porte, who rewarded Sulayman with a special waqf (trust) that gave him authority over Gaza, Jaffa and Jerusalem (in effect all of southwestern Palestine). Sulayman then appointed Abu-Nabbut governor of the Gaza Sanjak, which included Jaffa. In Jerusalem, shortly after the siege against Jaffa, popular riots broke out and the city's Damascus-appointed mutasallim (Jerusalem was part of Damascus Eyalet) was unable to suppress the riots. Sulayman dispatched one of his commanders, Muhammad Agha Abu Dhari'a, who managed to establish order and was subsequently appointed by Sulayman as mutasallim. However, the assignment was short-lived as Sulayman did not challenge the wali of Damascus when the latter reasserted Damascene authority over Jerusalem and replaced Abu Dhari'a.

The siege against Jaffa was one of the few military actions undertaken by Sulayman, unlike Jazzar, who faced and suppressed numerous rebellions by local forces in Palestine and Mount Lebanon and forcibly exacted heavy tolls on the population. By contrast, military force played a relatively minor role during Sulayman's reign. Rather, Sulayman strove to maintain peace and security by mediating between rival sheikhs. Because of this reputation, he gained the nickname "al-Adil", which means "the Just".

Having substantially reduced the size of Acre's military's forces, partially because Acre's wealth from the cotton trade was diminishing and partially out of political preference, Sulayman ruled by diplomacy and interfered far less in the affairs of his deputy governors and in the affairs of the semi-autonomous sheikhs of Jabal Nablus. In the case of the latter, he lent his support to different rival factions (namely the Jarrar, Tuqan and Nimr families) at different stages, and often played the role of peacemaker in times of conflict between them. This marked a departure from Jazzar's centralization policies and the violence that was associated with his rule, hence his epithet "al-Jazzar" (the Butcher). Sulayman also appointed a local strongman, Mas'ud al-Madi of Ijzim, the mutasallim of the Atlit coast that covered the area between Jaffa and Acre. Sulayman's inner circle consisted of Ali Pasha (died 1814), Haim Farhi (his Jewish vizier and financial adviser) and Ibrahim Awra (his Melkite chief scribe).

Under Farhi's guidance, Sulayman focused his rule on reinvigorating Acre's declining economy. This entailed a significant loosening of the cotton monopoly that his predecessors Jazzar and Zahir al-Umar had established by relaxing controls over the price of cotton and giving the native merchants of Acre virtual ownership over the shops they leased from his government. Moreover, he ceased the extortion of merchants and the confiscation of their goods, acts that were prevalent during Jazzar's rule. In effect, Farhi and Sulayman were careful not to lose total control over the cotton trade, while significantly easing the pressure on merchants and the peasant suppliers. These policies also extended to the monopolies on olive oil and grain, the other two lucrative cash crops of Palestine and the surrounding region.

In 1808, he decommissioned his Albanian contingent, which was his most competent military unit. By then, the estimate of his troops, who were distributed between Gaza and Beirut, was between 1,000 and 2,000. In Acre itself, he maintained a guard of roughly 200 soldiers, in contrast to his deputy Abu-Nabbut of Jaffa, who had a force of over 500.

== Governor of Damascus ==
In 1810, Sulayman and his allies in Mount Lebanon, Emir Bashir Shihab II and Sheikh Bashir Jumblatt, responded to an appeal by Kunj Yusuf Pasha, wali of Damascus, for military backing to counter an impending invasion of Damascus by Wahhabi tribesmen who had entered the Hauran plain south of the city. Sulayman assembled what was left of his troops, including Maghrebi, Kurdish, Turkish, Arab and Albanian soldiers, while Emir Bashir brought with him a multi-confessional force of Sunni and Shia Muslim, Druze and Christian warriors from Lebanon and the coalition mobilized at Tiberias. By the time they crossed the Jordan River and reached Quneitra, Kunj Yusuf sent them a request to withdraw on account of the Wahhabis' sudden retreat to the Hejaz.

Sulayman refused Kunj Yusuf's order and marched towards Damascus. Kunj Yusuf sent a force to stop them at Judaydat Artuz, but after a brief confrontation, Sulayman's forces defeated Kunj Yusuf's troops. Sulayman had received an approval from the Sublime Porte (Ottoman imperial government) to replace Kunj Yusuf, who had consistently failed to undertake his duty as amir al-hajj and lead the annual Hajj caravan to Mecca (due to Wahabbi raids). In addition to the offices of wali of Damascus and amir al-hajj, Sulayman was also appointed wali of Tripoli and reconfirmed as wali of Sidon.

In May 1811, in a move to consolidate power, Wali Muhammad Ali massacred the mamluks of Egypt and effectively destroyed that province's mamluk system. A handful of mamluks, including Amin Bey, escaped and made their way to Acre, where Sulayman Pasha put them into his service. The mamluks of Acre were perturbed by Muhammad Ali's action and viewed Acre as the last mamluk stronghold. In response to the May massacre, Sulayman, whose treasury had considerably grown due to grain sales to England, purchased hundreds of mamluks in the summer of 1812. His forces consequently swelled to about 2,500. However, the mamluk role in Sulayman's 500-strong cavalry was eclipsed by the Kurdish commanders Shamdin Agha, Ni'mat Agha and Ayalyaqin Agha and the 400-strong Bedouin Hawwara irregular cavalry led by the Arab officers Musa Agha al-Hasi and Ali Abu Zayd Agha. The mamluks also played no role in the 200-strong infantry, which was commanded by the Albanian officer Muhammad Agha al-Nu'man of Tyre, nor with the roughly 700 artillerymen of Acre.

Instead of the military, Sulayman placed his mamluks in numerous political and administrative posts to ensure their loyalty and the smooth functioning of a system dependent on that loyalty. As wali of Damascus, he appointed the mamluks Uzun Ali al-Qasir as mutasallim of Hama, Ja'far Agha as mutasallim of Homs, Darwish Agha as mutasallim of Damascus and Kunj Ahmad Agha as mutasallim of Jerusalem. He also appointed Musa Bey Tuqan as the mutasallim of Nablus. Ali Pasha supervised Acre on Sulayman's behalf, while the latter resided in Damascus.

Sulayman was replaced as wali of Damascus with Silahdar Süleyman Pasha in 1812. However, by then, the Sublime Porte allowed his annexation of most of the Tripoli Eyalet, including the Latakia Sanjak, to Sidon Eyalet, which he continued to govern. Sidon Eyalet at that time had already been expanded during Jazzar's reign to include Gaza Sanjak. The sanjaks of Nablus, Jerusalem and Lajjun were still a part of Damascus Eyalet, although Sulayman, like his predecessors, wielded authority in these areas at Damascus's expense. He was twice briefly reappointed wali of Damascus, including in 1816 after Silahdar died, but this was an interim post to be held only until the arrival of the newly appointed governor, Salih Pasha.

== Later years and death ==
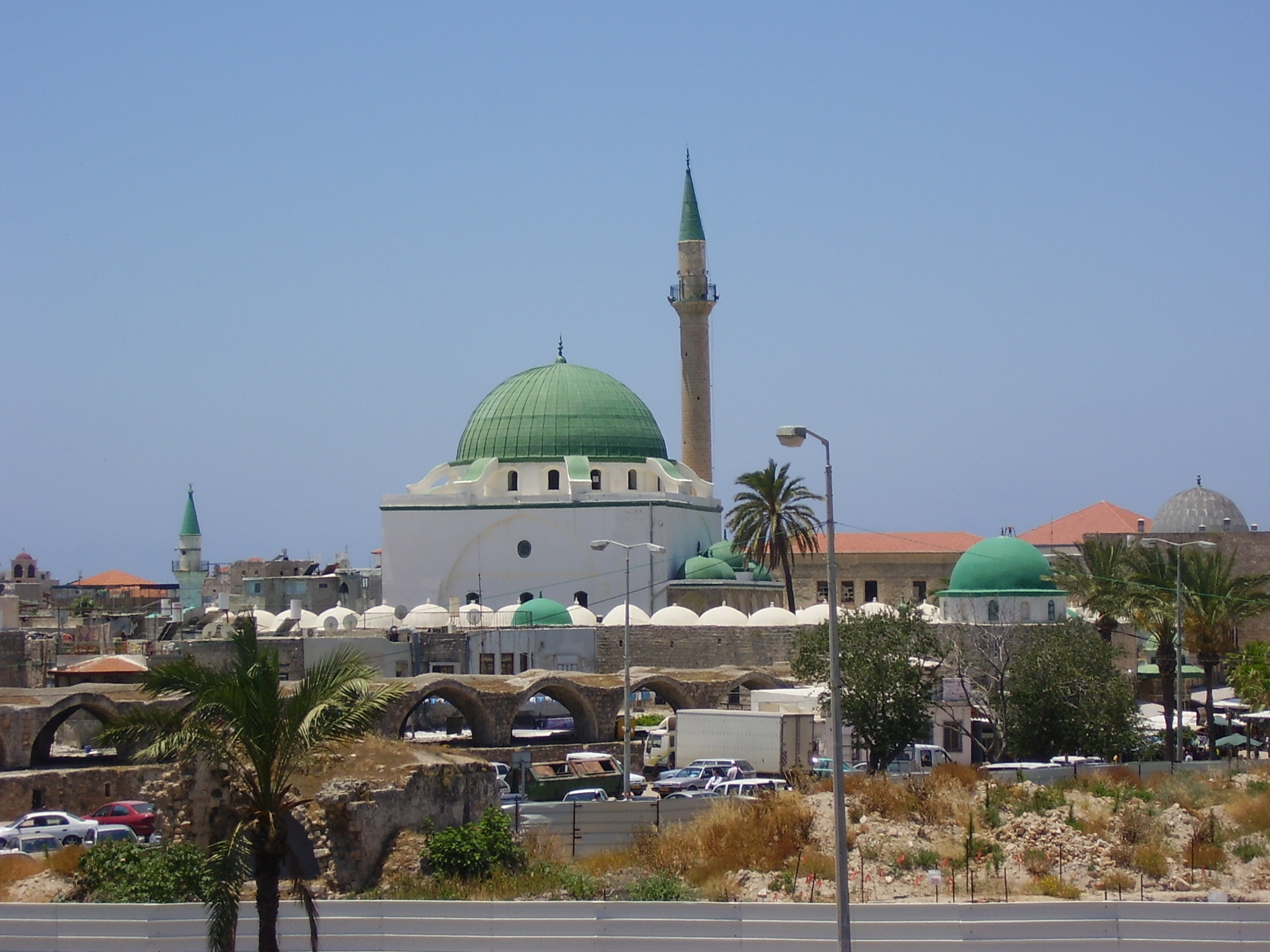
Sulayman Pasha was buried at the courtyard of the Jazzar Mosque in Acre

Each time Sulayman was given the interim office of wali of Damascus it had occurred during the months before the Hajj when the wali of Damascus (who by imperial decree was also the amir al-hajj, or "commander of the Hajj pilgrimage") would make his dawrah tour to collect the miri (funds for the pilgrimage caravan) from the various districts. This was often an arduous process in the semi-autonomous regions, particularly in Jabal Nablus, where successive Ottoman governors failed to assert their authority. Through diplomatic relations, particularly his relationship with the Tuqan family, Sulayman was able to collect these funds and thus boost his authority over the central mountainous areas of Palestine, which were officially outside of Sidon's jurisdiction.

In 1817, the Tuqans attempted to overtake their rivals, the Nimr family, in Nablus city, prompting a violent backlash from all of the rural sheikhs of Jabal Nablus, including the Jarrar, Abd al-Hadi and Qasim families, who backed the Nimrs. This resulted in a civil war in Jabal Nablus with a stalemate marked by heavy casualties on both sides. Sulayman traditionally backed the Tuqans, although his scribe Ibrahim al-Awra asserted that he started to lean towards the side of the Jarrars and Abd al-Hadis, likely in order to create a balance of power in Nablus that he could still influence and manage, rather than encourage a strong singular Nabulsi authority. Thus, Sulayman withheld tangible support for Musa Bey Tuqan and instead opened negotiations between the warring factions at his Acre headquarters. He managed to secure a peace between Musa Bey and the Jarrar and Abd al-Hadi families later that year. By July 1818, through his offices with the mufti (leading Muslim scholar) of Nablus, he brought the Nimr family into the peace arrangements as well. The agreement entailed a large payment of blood money from the Tuqans to the other families, but with the understanding that Musa Bey would remain mutasallim of Nablus.

With the death of his deputy Ali Pasha Khazindar in 1814 and Farhi's opposition to Abu-Nabbut of Jaffa, Ali Pasha's son, Abdullah Pasha, who Farhi greatly favored, emerged as the chosen successor of Sulayman. The latter set a number of ground rules with the then-adolescent Abdullah. Among these were that Abdullah was not to have his own office in Sulayman's headquarters like Ali Pasha, nor was he to have his hand kissed by others or to publicly eat and drink with Sulayman. Sulayman became ill and died in August 1819 and was buried alongside Jazzar in the courtyard of the Jazzar Mosque in Acre. Sulayman was officially succeeded by Abdullah in January 1820, after several months of Farhi negotiating with and bribing the officials of the Sublime Porte to make the appointment. Farhi, who believed he could wield power through Abdullah, was strangled and thrown from Acre's walls into the sea on Abdullah's orders several months after taking office.

== Building works ==
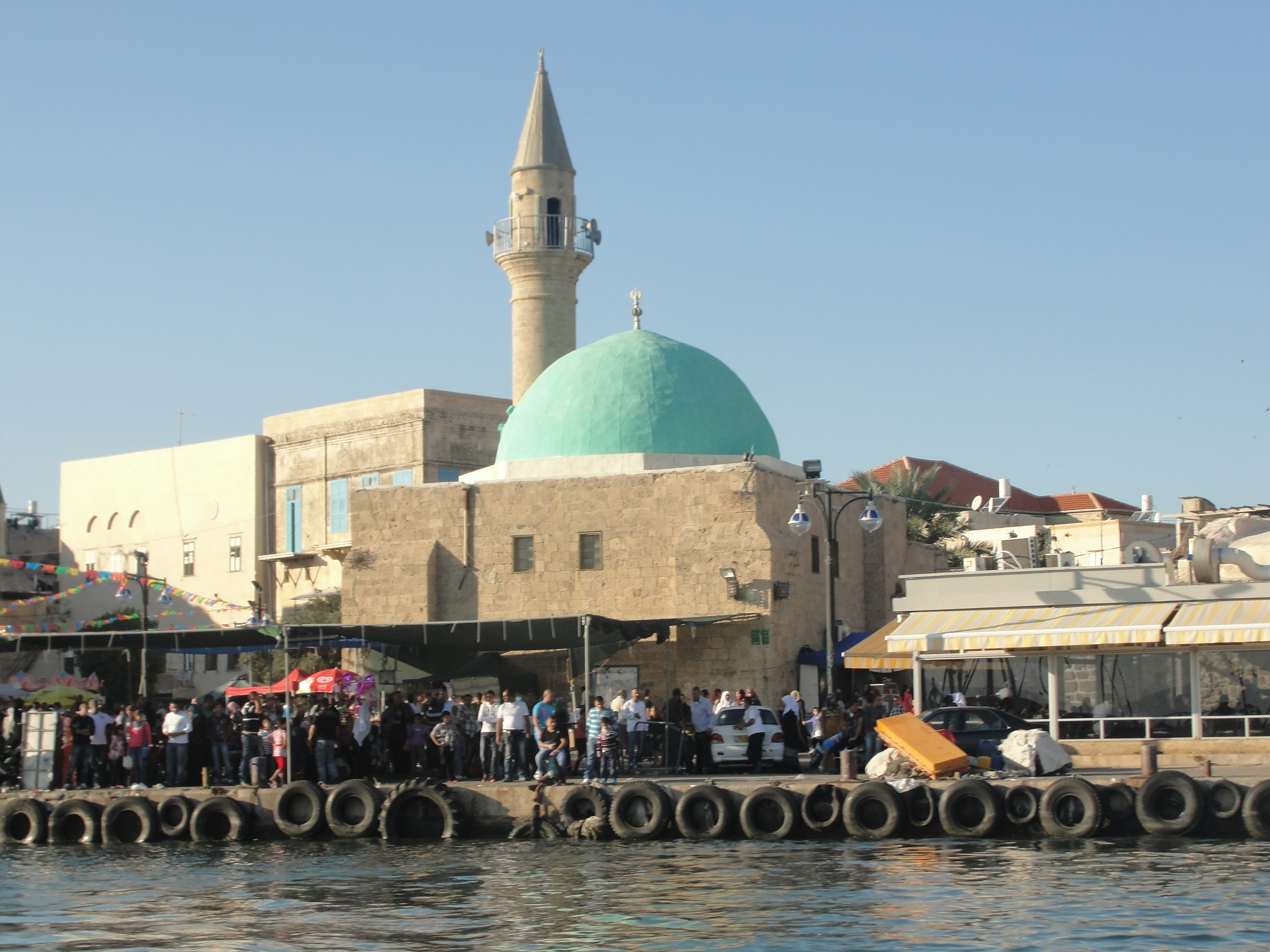
Sulayman Pasha rebuilt the Sinan Mosque in Acre, which is also known as the Bahr Mosque

Sulayman did not launch major commercial building projects in Acre like Jazzar. In 1817 he had Zahir al-Umar's souk (bazaar) rebuilt after it was destroyed by a fire. It has since become known as Souk al-Abyad. The Sinan Mosque of Acre, which had been the only mosque in the city in 1700, was rebuilt by Sulayman. It is also known as the Bahr Mosque (Sea Mosque). In 1815 he restored the Kabri aqueduct to Acre which had been built by Jazzar but destroyed during Napoleon's 1799 siege. In 1810, Sulayman built a khan (caravanserai) for the donkey market in Acre. Sulayman also invested his own money to fund several renovation works in Jerusalem and its vicinity. Among the projects was the restoration of the al-Aqsa Mosque in 1816.

Sulayman ensures domestic security along the main roads of Sidon Eyalet partly due to the construction of watchtowers at several points along the highways. The constructions were undertaken by Sulayman in 1813, as well as by his local deputies. The roads largely remained in a state of disrepair. Towards the end of his rule, Sulayman attempted to improve the navigability of the roads by widening the mountainous path through Ras al-Naqoura and constructing a bridge over the Zahrani River.

== Bibliography ==
- Carstens, Patrick Richard (2014). The Encyclopædia of Egypt during the Reign of the Mehemet Ali Dynasty 1798-1952: The People, Places and Events that Shaped Nineteenth Century Egypt and its Sphere of Influence. FriesenPress. ISBN 9781460248997.
- Doumani, Beshara (1995). Rediscovering Palestine: Merchants and Peasants in Jabal Nablus. University of California Press.
- Mattar, Phillip (2005). Encyclopedia of the Palestinians. Infobase Publishing. ISBN 9780816069866.
- Mishaqah, Mikha'il (1988). William McIntosh Thackston (ed.). Murder, Mayhem, Pillage, and Plunder: The History of the Lebanon in the 18th and 19th Centuries by Mikhayil Mishaqa (1800–1873). SUNY Press. ISBN 9780887067129.
- Philipp, Thomas (2001). Acre: The Rise and Fall of a Palestinian City, 1730–1831. Columbia University Press. ISBN 9780231506038.
- Sajdi, Dana (2013). The Barber of Damascus: Nouveau Literacy in the Eighteenth-Century Ottoman Levant. Stanford University Press. ISBN 9780804788281.
- Winter, Michael (2004). The Mamluks in Egyptian and Syrian Politics and Society. BRILL. ISBN 9789004132863.
- Yazbak, Mahmoud (1998). Haifa in the Late Ottoman Period, A Muslim Town in Transition, 1864–1914. Brill Academic Pub. ISBN 90-04-11051-8.

Preceded by Jezzar Pasha	Wali of Sidon; 1774—1774	Succeeded by Abdullah Pasha ibn Ali
Preceded by Kunj Yusuf Pasha	Wali of Damascus; 1810–1812	Succeeded by Silahdar Süleyman Pasha
