= Iaal =

Iaal ايعال
- Village
- Location within Lebanon
- Coordinates: 34°22′N 35°55′E
- Country: Lebanon
- Governorate: North Governorate
- District: Zgharta Alzawieh District

Government
  - Mayor: Hatem Dib (elected May 2016)

Area
  - Total: 2.89 km^{2} (1.12 sq mi)
- Elevation: 281 m (922 ft)

Population (2010)
  - Total: 1,000
  - Density: 350/km^{2} (900/sq mi)

Demographics
  - Languages: Overwhelmingly Arabic and English
- Time zone: UTC+2 (EET)
  - Summer (DST): UTC+3 (EEST)
- Postal code: 2220
- Dialing code: +961

Iaal (Arabic: ايعال, also spelt as Ī`āl, Iäal, Izal or I’aal) is a village located in the Zgharta District in the North Governorate of Lebanon.

== Etymology ==
The name Iaal is phonetically derived from the sound donkeys make when braying (onomatopoeia). This was chosen in honour of the preeminent role donkeys played in logistics connecting the coastal and mountain regions through Iaal.

The village's alternative name, Izal, has its origin in Aramaic.

== Location ==
Iaal is located approximately 12 kilometres (7.5 mi) south-east of Tripoli, 85 kilometres (53 mi) from Beirut and 5 kilometres (3.1 mi) from Zgharta. It is situated within the Zgharta District of the North Governorate of Lebanon. Iaal lies at the foot of the Mount Lebanon range and has a road that runs up into the mountains (parallel to Wadi Iaal) passing through its borders. Neighbouring and nearby communities include Jdaydeh, Kfaryachit, Khaldieh, Morh Kfarsghab and Sakhra. Iaal is one of five predominantly Sunni towns in the Zgharta District.

== Buildings ==
The most identifiable building in Iaal is the castle/fort built on the hilltop of the village centre: the Fortress of Iaal It was built in 1816 by Mustafa Agha Barbar (the Ottoman governor of Tripoli from 1798) because the area was considered strategic thanks to its panoramic views, which extend all the way down to the Mediterranean coast. The other identifiable building in Iaal is the mosque along the road that runs up into the mountains called Masjid al-Taqwa (Arabic for Mosque of Piety), built in 1994.

== History ==
It appears that Iaal was inhabited prior to the arrival of Barbar, as evidenced by a census conducted by the Ottomans in 1555 showing that there were 34 males in the village at that time (females were excluded from the census). However, who these villagers were and where they originated from is unknown.

== Agriculture ==
The land of Iaal is watered by Iaal Dam and its outflow of Wadi Iaal. This makes it fertile, sustaining a variety of produce and grazing animals, and has resulted in making Iaal famous for its olive tree gardens.

== Climate ==
Iaal's climate is typical of a Mediterranean plain village: with heavy rains, mild winters and hot, dry, arid summers. Its annual rainfall is 810 millimetres (32 in). Its average monthly temperatures are shown below:

Climate data for Iaal, Lebanon
Month	Jan	Feb	Mar	Apr	May	Jun	Jul	Aug	Sep	Oct	Nov	Dec	Year
Mean daily maximum °C (°F)	16 (61)	16 (61)	19 (66)	22 (72)	25 (77)	27 (81)	29 (84)	30 (86)	29 (84)	27 (81)	22 (72)	18 (64)	23 (73)
Daily mean °C (°F)	12 (54)	12.5 (54.5)	14.5 (58.1)	17.5 (63.5)	20.5 (68.9)	23 (73)	25.5 (77.9)	26.5 (79.7)	24.5 (76.1)	22 (72)	17.5 (63.5)	14 (57)	19.2 (66.6)
Mean daily minimum °C (°F)	8 (46)	9 (48)	10 (50)	13 (55)	16 (61)	19 (66)	22 (72)	23 (73)	20 (68)	17 (63)	13 (55)	10 (50)	15 (59)
Source: labans.com

== People ==
Its inhabitants number about 1,000 people (although precise figures are unattainable). In 1988 Iaal had a total population of 903, and in 1998 its population increased by almost 20% to 1,082 people. However, these figures relate to all registered citizens originating from the village, including both residents in Lebanon and those who emigrated abroad. The people of Iaal are also all related to one another through common ancestors. The majority of people who trace their ancestry to the village actually live outside of Iaal. The overwhelming majority of these immigrants and their descendants live in Australia, primarily Sydney, in the local government areas of the Municipality of Kogarah (especially the suburb of South Hurstville) and the City of Liverpool. This diaspora community also runs the Iaal Charitable Association Inc. During the late 19th and early 20th century, most people from Iaal (at the time) emigrated to Latin America; however, these emigrants fully assimilated into their new environments and lost all connections with their homeland.

Some common surnames of people from Iaal include Affouf, Al-Choukairy, Al-Hage, Ardati, Ayyoub, Dennaoui, Diab, Dib, Elmir, Habib, Hadid, Halbouni, Hammoud, Hussein, Ibrahim, Issa, Jameel, Khidr, Mahrees, Merhi, Nasreddine, Nasser, Shehaddy, Subkhi and Taleb.

=== Notable people ===
Some notable people born in or descending from Iaal include:

- Bianca Elmir (daughter of Ahmad) - Australian boxer
- Rahma el-Dennaoui - Australian girl who went missing in 2005
- Khoder Nasser (son of Yasser) - sports manager.
