= Disappearance of Rahma el-Dennaoui =

2005 missing child case in Australia

Rahma el-Dennaoui
- Born: 19 April 2004; Sydney, Australia
- Disappeared: 10 November 2005 (aged 1); Lurnea, Sydney, Australia
- Status: Missing for 21 years and 5 days
- Known for: Disappearance

Rahma el-Dennaoui (born 19 April 2004) is a Lebanese Australian girl who went missing on 10 November 2005, when she was 19 months old. She was last seen early that morning in the bedroom of her home in Lurnea, Sydney, Australia, where she and her siblings slept. Despite a police search and investigation, appeals to the general public and a coronial inquest in 2012, no trace has been found of the child as of May 2019.

NSW Police have posted a reward of A$250,000 for information which would help to close the case.

== Background ==
Rahma was born to Hosayn el-Dennaoui, a migrant from Iaal, Lebanon, and Alyaa, from the nearby village of Dayranbouh.

== Disappearance ==
Rahma was sleeping between two of her sisters on a double bed under the window on the night of 9 November 2005. She had trouble sleeping in the heat and her father got up and went to check on her at 2 am. When he returned at 8 am, she was gone. Rahma had only learned to walk quite recently, and it is nearly 1 kilometre (0.62 mi) from the El-Dennaoui home to any bushland. There was a rip in the fly screen covering the window above her bed, and this opening was large enough for Rahma to fit through. Other sources say the screen was cut, not torn.

Her three-year-old sister told police that she saw her sister being abducted by a man who did not have any hands.

== Investigation ==
Police treated the case as a potential abduction after an extensive search brought no further clues or sightings of the girl. Sniffer dogs found no trace of the little girl.

After coronial inquest which ran from April to November 2012, Deputy State Coroner Sharon Freund handed down an open finding. She reported that there had been shortcomings and issues with the police investigation of both the family and a suspected pedophile who lived nearby. During the inquest, police reported their belief that the abduction was likely staged, and that she died in an "accident or mishap" in the family home, with her body subsequently disposed.

In May 2007, New Idea magazine offered a $20,000 reward "for information leading to Rahma's safe return". The magazine's editor-in-chief Robyn Foster said that the similarities between Rahma and the highly publicised case of Madeleine McCann sparked her interest in the case. In January 2019, NSW Police posted a $250,000 reward for information which would help to close the case.

== Fraser Anning incident ==
On 12 May 2019 Fraser Anning, an Australian senator running for re-election in the 2019 Australian federal election, posted on his Facebook page two photographs, one of the el-Dennaouis and another of a white family with a boy holding an Australian flag, and the words "If you want a Muslim for a neighbour, just vote Labor". The photograph of the el-Dennaouis was apparently used in a 2010 Daily Telegraph article, when appeals were being made for information following the girl's disappearance. The post was deleted the following day, but not before it had attracted a number of negative comments after Mariam Veiszadeh and others had tweeted about it.

== See also ==
- List of people who disappeared mysteriously (2000–present)
