= Kunj Yusuf Pasha =

Ottoman governor of Damascus

Wali of Damascus
- In office 1807–1810
- Preceded by: Abdullah Pasha al-Azm
- Succeeded by: Sulayman Pasha al-Adil

Personal details
- Died: Egypt Eyalet

Kunj Yusuf Pasha (also spelled Kanj Yusuf Pasha) was an Ottoman Kurd who served as the governor of Damascus Eyalet between 1807 and 1810. As governor, Kunj Yusuf enacted discriminatory policies against religious minority groups in Damascus and was unable to secure the annual Hajj pilgrim caravan to Mecca. After his inability to defeat Wahhabi invaders in 1809, he was ousted by Sulayman Pasha al-Adil with the blessing of the Ottoman imperial authorities.

== Governor of Damascus ==
Kunj Yusuf Pasha was a "renowned horseman", according to historian Mikhail Mishaqa, and initially served under the Hama-based Kurdish agha, Mulla Isma'il. Kunj Yusuf entered the service of Damascus governor Abdullah Pasha al-Azm, and was made commander of a Kurdish battalion. Kunj Yusuf was promoted to become Abdullah Pasha's senior aide and he became a superior of Mulla Isma'il.

As part of official policy, the governor of Damascus duly served as the amir al-hajj (Commander of the Hajj Pilgrimage), who was responsible for leading and securing the annual Hajj pilgrimage caravan to Mecca. Due to an invasion by Wahhabi tribesmen, Abdullah Pasha did not feel able to ensure the safety of the Muslim pilgrims, and the Hajj from Syrian was consequently suspended. Kunj Yusuf used Abdullah Pasha's failure to carry out his duty to lobby for Abdullah Pasha's dismissal. In 1807, the Ottoman imperial government dismissed Abdullah Pasha and appointed Kunj Yusuf as governor based on the latter's promise to successfully lead the pilgrim caravan.

Kunj Yusuf was unable to end Wahhabi raids and sought to compensate for his failure to lead the Muslim pilgrimage by enacting discriminatory policies against Christians and Jews in Damascus. Among the new directives he issued were that Christian men had to adorn black turbans and Jewish men red turbans to distinguish them from Muslim residents, and that Christian women wear black or red robes at bathhouses to distinguish themselves from Muslim women. Dress policies extended to Muslims as well, with one directive ordering Muslim men to paint the corners of their eyes black. Despite these policies, Kunj Yusuf's inner circle was dominated by the Jewish Farhi family and later by his chief scribe, the Melkite Abbud al-Bahri.

In 1808 Kunj Yusuf, backed Mulla Isma'il, launched a campaign to subdue the strongman of Tripoli, Mustafa Agha Barbar. Kunj Yusuf's forces besieged Tripoli, but failed to defeat Barbar, who received 500 arnauts (Albanian mercenaries). That same year, Kunj Yusuf intervened to restore the Ismailis to their fortress stronghold of Masyaf after they had been expelled by the Alawite Raslan clan. He also launched a military campaign against the Harfush clan of the Beqaa Valley.

=== Defeat and exile ===
In 1809, the Wahhabi tribesmen had entered the town of Muzayrib in the Hauran plain south of Damascus. Kunj Yusuf's forces were not able to challenge them. According to Mishaqa, Kunj Yusuf had neither sufficient troops nor ammunition, and his forces were too weak oust them from the Hejaz, which the Wahhabis had recently conquered, let alone from the plains of Damascus Eyalet. The Wahhabis sent a warning to Kunj Yusuf demanding that he surrender Damascus and embrace their puritanical version of Islam (the Wahhabi sheikhs considered the mainstream Sunni Islam practiced by most Ottoman Muslims to be heretical). Kunj Yusuf subsequently sent a delegation to the Wahhabis to reach a compromise on the one hand, and on the other hand appealed for military backing from the governor of Sidon Eyalet, Sulayman Pasha al-Adil, and the emir of Mount Lebanon, Bashir Shihab II.

Sulayman Pasha and Emir Bashir II responded positively and assembled a large multi-confessional coalition to oust the Wahhabis. However, by the time the coalition reached Quneitra, Kunj Yusuf requested them to demobilize after hearing news of Muhammad Ali of Egypt's conquest of the Hejaz from the Wahhabis and the consequent Wahhabi retreat from Hauran. Sulayman Pasha refused and the Sublime Porte dismissed Kunj Yusuf as a result of his failure to lead the Hajj caravan and his attempted overtures to the Wahabbi sheikhs. After a brief battle at Judaydat Artuz outside Damascus, Kunj Yusuf's forces were defeated.

Kunj Yusuf and Abbud al-Bahri fled to Egypt to seek Muhammad Ali's protection after his defeat. The inhabitants of Damascus were reportedly relieved when Kunj Yusuf was ousted, according to Mishaqa, because it signaled an end to his eccentric policies and opened up a possibility for the resumption of the Hajj pilgrimage. The Sublime Porte issued a consent for Kunj Yusuf's self-exile and he remained there until his death. Ahmad Bey, Kunj Yusuf's adopted son, was appointed governor of Damascus by Ibrahim Pasha of Egypt in the early years (1831-1832) of Muhammad Ali's conquest of Ottoman Syria.

== Bibliography ==
- Douwes, Dick (2000). The Ottomans in Syria: a history of justice and oppression. I.B. Tauris. ISBN 1860640311.
- Mishaqah, M. (1988). William McIntosh Thackston (ed.). Murder, Mayhem, Pillage, and Plunder: The History of the Lebanon in the 18th and 19th Centuries by Mikhayil Mishaqa (1800-1873). SUNY Press. ISBN 9780887067129.
- Philipp, T. (2013). Acre: The Rise and Fall of a Palestinian City, 1730-1831. Columbia University Press. ISBN 9780231506038.
- Rogan, Eugene L. (2012). The Arabs: A History. Basic Books. ISBN 9780465032488.

Preceded by Abdullah Pasha al-Azm	Wali of Damascus; 1807-1810	Succeeded by Sulayman Pasha al-Adil
