= Muhammad Sa'id Pasha Shamdin =

Ottoman military official

Muhammad Sa'id Pasha Shamdin (died 1900), also known as Muhammad Sa'id Agha Shamdin, was an Ottoman military official of the Syria Vilayet, best known for being the amir al-hajj (commander of the Hajj pilgrim caravan to Mecca) for 20 years.

== Military career ==
Muhammad Sa'id was a son of Shamdin Agha (d. 1860), a Kurdish irregular cavalry commander in Damascus under the provincial government. They belonged to the Shamdin-Yusuf, the strongest Kurdish clan of 19th-century Damascus.

In March 1844, the Damascus Provincial Council appointed Muhammad Sa'id to command an expedition to Jabal Ajlun, a mountainous region in the province's hinterland where government authority was weak. The purpose of the expedition was to assert government rule and secure the administrative center of Irbid against the Bedouin tribes, which wielded more influence in the district and historically imposed their own taxes on the inhabitants. The mission evidently failed.

In 1859, after the irregular garrisons of Damascus were disbanded by government order, Muhammad Sa'id was appointed to a newly-formed Kurdish auxiliary corps. During the 1860 civil conflict in Mount Lebanon and Damascus, Muhammad Sa'id failed to prevent his Kurdish irregulars from joining in a wide-scale massacre of Christians in the city's Bab Tuma quarter. As punishment, the imperial government exiled him to Mosul. There, he helped bring order to the city and was rewarded by a pardon from the sultan, who allowed him to return to Damascus. He was appointed the sanjakbey of Hauran, taking over from another Kurdish officer, Ahmad Yusuf Pasha. He soon after replaced Ahmad's brother Muhammad Yusuf Pasha as amir al-hajj (commander of the annual Hajj pilgrim caravan to Mecca), beginning in the late 1860s. He would hold that post for twenty years.

== Wealth and legacy ==
Muhammad accumulated significant wealth in his capacity as amir al-hajj and invested considerable sums acquiring numerous villages and farms in the Ghouta oasis of Damascus, which became part of a Shamdin family endowment, and several tracts in the Hauran plains and the Golan Heights area. Among the villages he acquired were Tell al-Jukhadar and Saham al-Jawlan, the latter of which he purchased cheap and sold at a significant profit to a Jewish colonization group. His wealth was such that by the 1890s he was known to own more property in the Damascus Vilayet than any other individual.

Muhammad's wealth was inherited by the son of his only daughter (and only child), Abd al-Rahman Yusuf, who married into the Yusuf family. Abd al-Rahman became the amir al-hajj in 1892 and after his grandfather's death inherited his lands and fortune.

== Bibliography ==
- Khoury, Phillip S. (2003). Urban Notables and Arab Nationalism: The Politics of Damascus 1860-1920. Cambridge University Press. ISBN 9780521533232.
- Palestine Exploration Fund (1895). Quarterly Statement for 1895. London: Society's Office and A. P. Watt and Son.
- Roded, Ruth (1983). "Ottoman Service as a Vehicle for the Rise of New Upstarts among the Urban Elite Families of Damascus in the Last Decades of Ottoman Rule". Asian and African Studies. 17: 63–94.
- Rogan, Eugene (1999). Frontiers of the State in the Late Ottoman Empire: Transjordan, 1850-1921. Cambridge: Cambridge University Press. ISBN 0-521-66312-1.
- Schilcher, Linda Schatkowski (1985). Families in Politics: Damascene Factions and Estates of the 18th and 19th Centuries. F. Steiner. ISBN 9783515031462.
