= Bianca Elmir =

Australian boxer (born 1982)

Personal information
- Full name: Bianca Elmir
- Nickname: Bam Bam
- Nationality: Australian
- Born: 24 July 1982 (age 44) Riyadh, Saudi Arabia
- Height: 157 cm (5 ft 2 in)
- Weight: 57 kg (126 lb)
- Updated on 13 November 2015

Bianca "Bam Bam" Elmir (born 24 July 1982) is an Australian boxer from Canberra, ACT. She has been the Australian Flyweight Champion and the Oceania Boxing Bantamweight Champion. Since starting to box in 2009, Elmir has aimed for one thing: to compete in the Olympics.

Outside of boxing, Elmir has been an executive assistant to an Australian state politician, ACT Greens politician Amanda Bresnan: She's a part of the green team and a part of our family, (Amanda Bresnan).

She has also spent a year working as a volunteer for a Youth Empowerment Programme for Restless Development in the rural Eastern Cape in South Africa. Elmir is currently studying for a Masters in Globalisation, working with at-risk youth in Canberra and as a boxing coach and trainer.

== Career ==
=== Boxing ===
Bianca has always been passionate about sports and began playing soccer at an early age. In 2003, Elmir's soccer coach suggested that she try a sport with more aggression and suggested she take up a contact sport such as kick-boxing. That began her kick boxing career which took her to the top of Australian Kick Boxing and Muay Thai.

In 2009 Elmir crossed over into boxing and very soon after that won the Oceania Championships in 2010 and the Australia Flyweight Championships in 2010 and 2011. She also won the best women's boxer trophy at the 2011 Bee Gee International Boxing Tournament in Finland. Elmir then focused on training for the London 2012 Olympics.

In February 2012, she won the 51-kilogram division at the Australian National Boxing Championships held in Hobart, Tasmania. However, after testing positive to banned diuretics furosemide and amiloride, she was stripped of this title. She had taken a diuretic before a long haul flight from Ireland to Australia to reduce swelling in her ankles and unbeknownst to her, it contained the two banned substances. Elmir was slapped with a 12-month doping ban just 14 hours before flying to China for the women's world championships in April 2012. This disqualified her from competing at the London Olympics in 2012.

Since then, Elmir has been based at Stockade Training Center in Canberra and has focused on coaching both male and female boxers. In April 2014, she competed in the Commonwealth Games trials in Fremantle, Perth but did not qualify. After this competition she changed her boxing division weight and will now be competing in the 60 kg division.

In July 2015, Elmir launched a boxing program in Canberra to help disadvantaged young people. She is also a champion of diversity for the ACT Human Rights Commission's campaign "Diversity Goes With Our Territory."

Elmir has said: "Getting punched in the face makes me feel alive. It sounds mental, it sounds like I'm a psychopath, but I'm not – I've checked," she joked. "When I no longer like being punched in the face, that's when I know it's time to hang up the gloves." Her main aim is to still qualify for the Olympics and she aims to qualify for the 2016 Summer Olympics in Rio, Brazil. She failed to qualify for Rio when beaten by Shelley Watts in a qualifying tournament in 2015 and later losing to Nikhat Zareen in her opening bout of the 2016 AIBA Women's World Boxing Championships.

A documentary film following Elmir's path to Rio 2016 was made by Lollapalooza Films and released in 2018.

=== Honours ===
Year	Tournament	Venue	Result	Event
2010	Australian Championships	Canberra, Australia	1st	51 kg
2011	Australian Championships	Canberra, Australia	1st	51 kg
2011	Gee Bee Boxing Tournament	Helsinki, Finland	1st	51 kg
2011	Adidas Champion	Paris, France	1st	51 kg
2014	Golden Gloves Boxing Tournament	Queensland, Australia	1st	51 kg
2015	Taipei City Cup	Taipei, Taiwan	1st	60 kg
2015	International Boxing Tournament Balkan	Sofia, Bulgaria	1st	60 kg

== Personal life ==
Elmir is of Lebanese heritage. After her parents divorced while she was an infant, her mother kidnapped Elmir from her paternal grandparents home in Iaal, Lebanon, flew her to Sydney and then raised her in Canberra, Australia. Since then, Bianca has met her father and her paternal grandparents in Lebanon and Saudi Arabia. Her father, Ahmad, was the former mayor of his village. Of her relationship with her father she has stated "I both hate and love my father." Her mother, Diana Abdel-Rahman, who hails from Miriata, is an ACT recipient of Australia Day honours.

Elmir is a supporter of LGBT rights and a member of Muslims for Progressive Values.
