= Haim Farhi =

Ottoman Jewish military adviser (1760–1820)

- חיים פרחי حيم فارحي
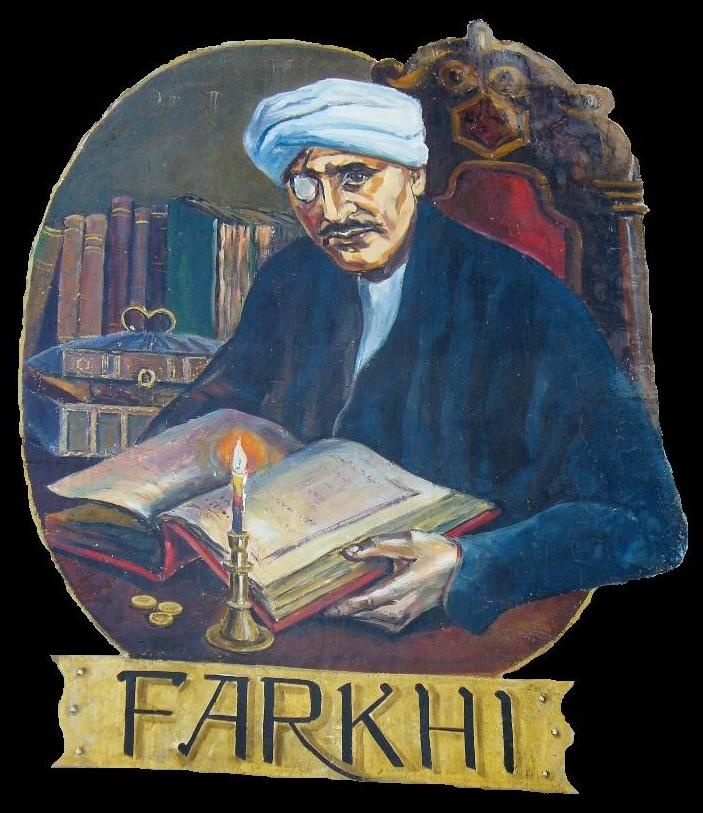
- Artistic impression
- Born: 1760; Damascus, Ottoman Empire (now Syria)
- Died: August 21, 1820 (aged 60); Acre, Ottoman Empire (now Israel)
- Cause of death: Assassination
- Other name: Haim El Muallim
- Occupations: Chief advisor, financial vizier and de facto ruler of Acre
- Employer: Ahmad al-Jazzar

Haim Farhi (Hebrew: חיים פרחי, Hayyim Farhiy; Arabic: حيم فارحي, also known as Haim "El Mu'allim", Arabic: المعلم lit. "The Teacher"), (1760 – August 21, 1820) was a Jewish adviser to the governors of the Galilee in the days of the Ottoman Empire, until his assassination in 1820.

Farhi was a chief advisor to Jazzar Pasha, an Ottoman governor based in Acre, whose whims included blinding Farhi and leaving him physically scarred. Until his assassination in 1820, instigated by Farhi's own protege Abdullah Pasha, Farhi was the financial vizier and de facto ruler of Acre. After the murder, Abdullah Pasha ordered Farhi's body cast into the sea and confiscated all his property. Two of Farhi's brothers, Soliman and Rafael, living in Damascus, organized a siege against Abdullah Pasha in Acre to exact revenge.

Revered among Jews as Hakham Haim due to his extensive Talmudic knowledge, Farhi hailed from a prominent family of traders and bankers in Damascus. He extended his protection to the Jewish communities of Palestine, especially those of Tiberias and Safed, who were under the jurisdiction of the governors of the Sidon Eyalet. Revered for his power and wealth, both Jews and European Christians recounted tales of his wealth and influence.

== Historical background ==
After the Ottoman conquest of the Levant from the Mamluks in 1516, Palestine became part of its empire. Vast areas of Asia, North Africa and Southeastern Europe were ruled almost autonomously by local governors. The Levant in particular, split into numerous feuding power centers.

Rule over the 'Sanjak of Acre' (roughly present-day northern Israel) was supposed to derive from the authority of the Damascus governorate and its Walis. In the 18th century, a powerful local leader, Zahir al-Umar, effectively severed ties with the empire and initiated widespread reforms, improving road infrastructure and security, and encouraging Christian and Jewish merchants to settle in the area and revive commerce.

After the Treaty of Kuchuk-Kainarji was signed with Russia on July 21, 1774, Sultan Abdul Hamid I sought to reassert Turkish sovereignty by attacking Dhaher and blockading the port of Acre. His troops rose in revolt and murdered their leader. In 1775 a Turkish officer, the Bosnian Mameluk Ahmad al-Jazzar took over, and the Turks regained control over the northern areas of the land.

Zahir al-Umar actively encouraged Jewish resettlement and personally invited Hayyim ben Jacob Abulafia of İzmir to settle in the Galilee. The rabbi, born in Hebron, then part of the Jerusalem Mutassariflik (Governorate/District), returned in 1740 and was received with full honours by Zahir. He settled in Tiberias, which was restored from its ruinous state. An impressive synagogue was built, roads were constructed, and Jewish agricultural settlements were founded at Pekiin, Shefa-'Amr, and Kafr Yasif. These policies continued under Ahmad al-Jazzar.

The existence of a strong local authority enforced the law and prevented Bedouin banditry on the roads. Zahir was one of the most tolerant and efficient local leaders and meted out justice equally to Muslim, Christian and Jew. This was the case in the days of Zahir and al-Jazzar who transformed the Galilee into a region that attracted both Arabs from Syria and Lebanon, and Jews from the east and west.

== Adviser to al-Jazzar ==
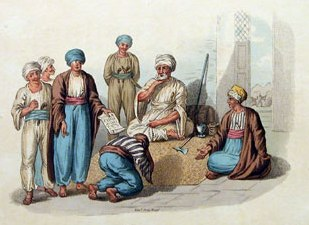
"Jezzar Pacha Condemning a Criminal". Farhi is pictured standing with paper in hand.

Haim Farhi was born to a respected and ancient Jewish family in Damascus. His father Saul had established a banking business that flourished to the extent that it expanded to control Syria's finances, banking and foreign trade for nearly a century. Together with other family members, Farhi worked as a financial agent in the Damascus district. Contemporary sources often mention the family as being the "real rulers of Syria".

They may also have mediated between the Jewish community and the authorities, trying to alleviate the tax burden placed on the Jews of Safed. Farhi succeeded his father as banker of the ruler of Damascus. He gained extensive influence with the Turkish government and became the adviser to Ahmad al-Jazzar, ruler of Acre. This was probably due to his intrigues that led to the execution of the previous advisor, Mikhail Sakruj, a Christian merchant from Shefa-'Amr.

Al-Jazzar was a violent and cruel ruler, which is evidenced from his title 'al-Jazzar' meaning 'The Butcher'. He would often find pretext to lash out in savage assaults. At different times he had Farhi's right eye plucked out, cut off his nose, and severed his right ear. A famous illustration from the time (see above) shows al-Jazzar sitting in judgment in front of his Jewish adviser, who is wearing an eye patch.

== Defeating Napoleon's siege ==
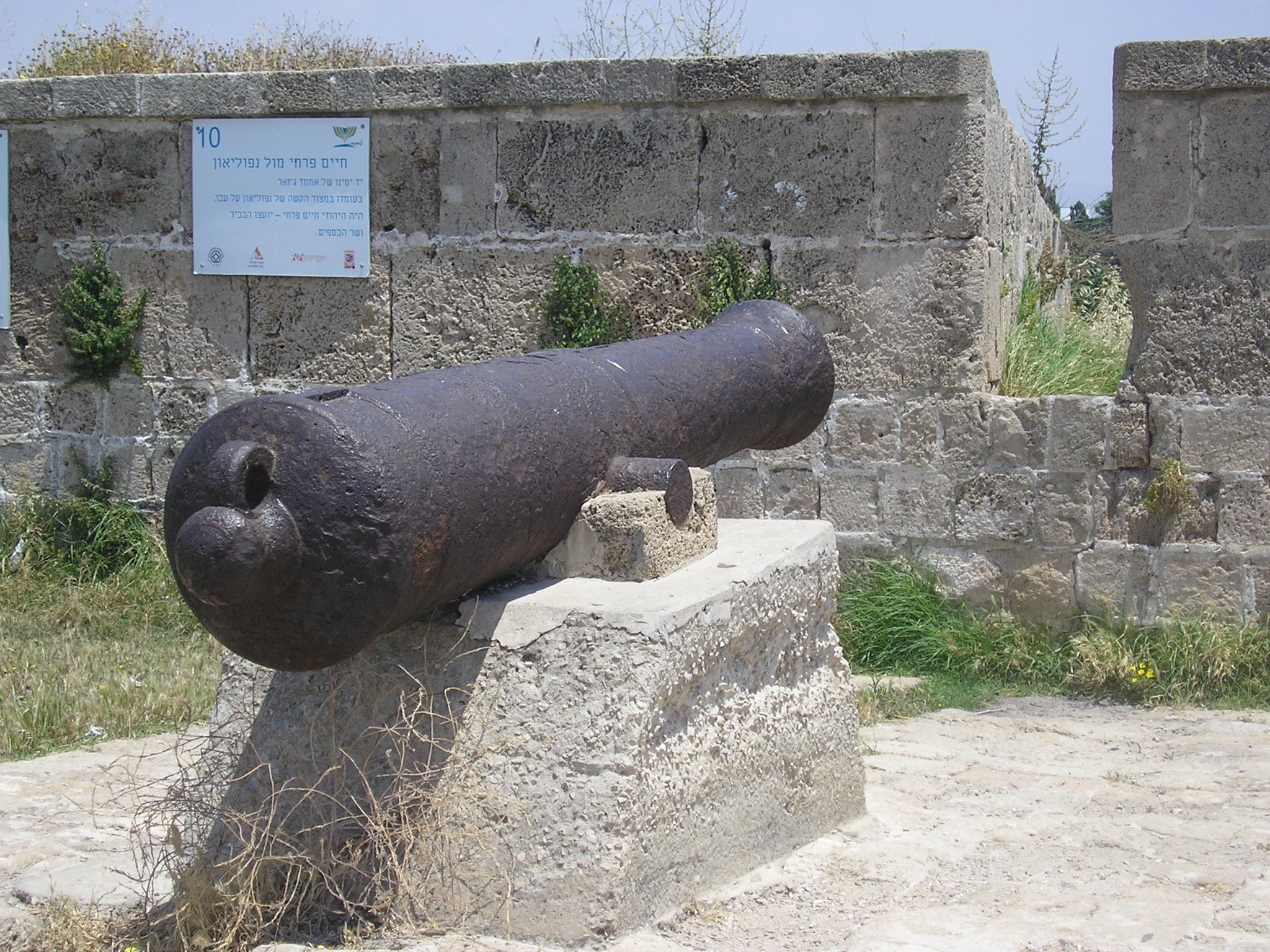
19th-century cannon, set in the wall of Acre near a sign commemorating Farhi. The Hebrew inscription on the sign reads: "Farhi vs. Napoleon. Jezzar's right hand in resisting Napoleon's harsh siege was the Jewish Haim Farhi, senior adviser and minister of finance"

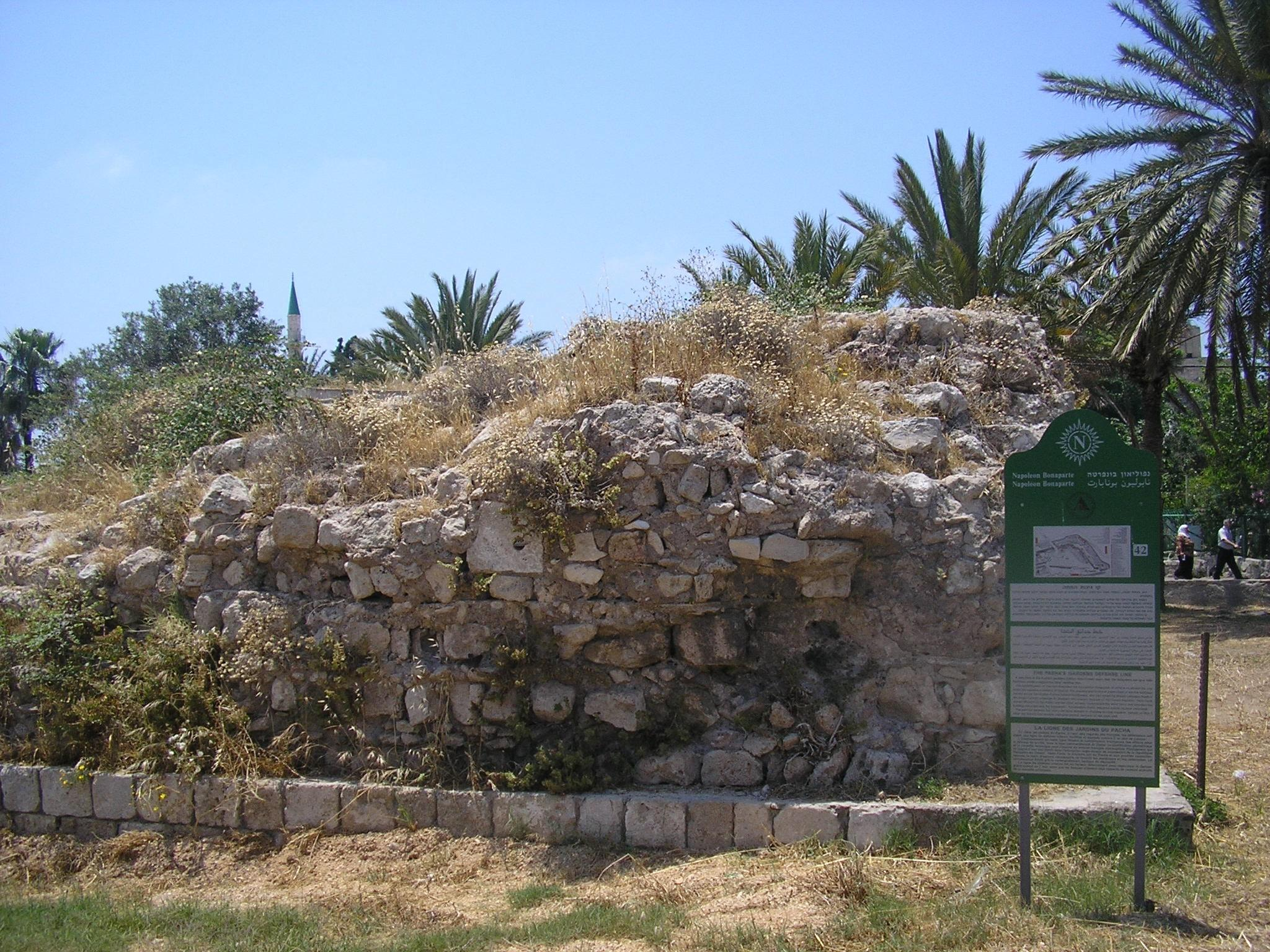
The remains of the internal fortification line erected by Farhi and De-Phelipoux within the walls of Acre, during Napoleon's siege, May 1799.

It was during the reign of al-Jazzar, in 1799, that the French general and future Emperor Napoleon Bonaparte tried to conquer the Damascus governorate. In February Napoleon and his army arrived from the south, captured Jaffa and massacred 2,000 Turkish prisoners. They then moved north, captured Haifa and the Jezreel Valley and laid siege to Acre. Al-Jazzar's troops, refusing to surrender, withstood the siege for one and a half months. A British naval force under the command of Admiral Sidney Smith came to the town's defense, and an artillery expert from the fleet, Antoine DePhelipoux, redeployed against Napoleon's forces artillery pieces which the British had intercepted from the French at sea.

Farhi played a key role in the city's defense. As al-Jazzar's adviser and right-hand man, he directly supervised how the battle against the siege was run. At the culmination of the assault, the besieging forces managed to make a breach in the walls. After suffering many casualties to open an entry-point, Napoleon's soldiers found, on trying to penetrate the city, that Farhi and DePhelipoux had, in the meantime, built a second wall, several feet deeper within the city where al-Jazzar's garden was.

Discovery of this new construction convinced Napoleon and his men that the probability of their taking the city was minimal. The siege was raised and Napoleon withdrew to Egypt.

Some hold that a statement attributed to Napoleon during the war, according to which he promised to return the land to the Jews if he were to succeed in his conquest of Palestine (Southern Syria), was meant to capture Farhi's attention and betray his master by switching his support to the French. However, Napoleon never showed any particular interest in winning over the Jews of Ottoman Syria during his campaign there, though his account of the military campaign records that a rumour among Syrian Jews had it that after Napoleon took Acre, he would go to Jerusalem and restore Solomon's Temple.

== Involvement in Jewish matters ==
Farhi provided support for Jewish immigrants who made aliyah and settled in Safed and Tiberias, including Hassidim, Perushim, and Ma'aravim, offering assistance with their tax burdens. During his tenure, the Jewish population in Acre grew to 800 individuals. The Jewish neighborhood in Tiberias also grew significantly as Rabbi Yitzhak Aboulafia, appointed by Farhi as governor and secretary of Safed and Tiberias, expanded its boundaries through the acquisition of a significant tract from Suleiman Pasha in 1805.

== Assassination ==
After the death of al-Jazzar in 1804, his mamluk Sulayman Pasha succeeded to the Pashalik of Akko. Under him, the Jews enjoyed, according to one traveller, 'perfect religious freedom', and were relieved of the substantial fines they were frequently compelled to pay under al-Jazzar, and were obliged to pay only the customary kharadj. Sulayman retained Farhi in the prominent financial and administrative role he held under al-Jazzar. After Sulayman's death in 1819, Farhi spent five months lobbying the Sublime Porte and making substantial payments to Ottoman officials in Constantinople to secure the governorship of Sidon for Abdullah Pasha, son of Sulayman's former deputy Ali Pasha Khazindar. Their relationship soon deteriorated as Abdullah sought to curb Farhi's extensive political and financial influence. Abdullah dismissed Farhi from office and refused his request to retire to Damascus, fearing he could use his connections against him. Their final dispute reportedly stemmed from the struggle over Farhi's growing power, during which Farhi reminded Abdullah of his role in securing his appointment as governor. This bitter argument prompted Abdullah to order his assassination and have him killed that same night.

On 21 August 1820, soldiers appeared at Farhi's residence in Acre, denouncing him as a traitor. They seized and strangled him to death, and ransacked his house. His family was denied permission to bury his body. The family assets were expropriated and Farhi's body was cast into the sea. The family escaped to Damascus; Farhi's wife, unable to withstand the rigours of the journey, died on the way, in Safed.

Abdullah then compelled the Jews of Acre and Safed to pay in full all the back taxes they would have owed had they not been exempted, through Farhi's good offices, from paying over the years.

== Retaliation ==
Farhi's murder precipitated what has been called "the first, serious ... existential crisis" for Acre. Seeking revenge, members of the Farhi family used their influence in Damascus and Constantinople to mobilize Ottoman support for Darwish Pasha, the governor of Damascus, against Abdullah. In June 1822, the Sublime Porte dismissed Abdullah and transferred the governorship of Sidon to Darwish. Abdullah refused to relinquish power and by the end of July Darwish laid siege to Acre with financial support from Farhi's brother Solomon. After five months without success, Darwish was replaced by Mustafa Pasha of Aleppo who continued the siege until Abdullah was restored to the governorship in April 1823.

== Legacy ==
Farhi's residence still stands today in Acre, but it is not open to visitors. Acre also has a square in his honour in the old sector of the city.
