= Acre aqueduct =

Defunct aqueduct in Israel

Coordinates: 32.9603°N 35.0951°E

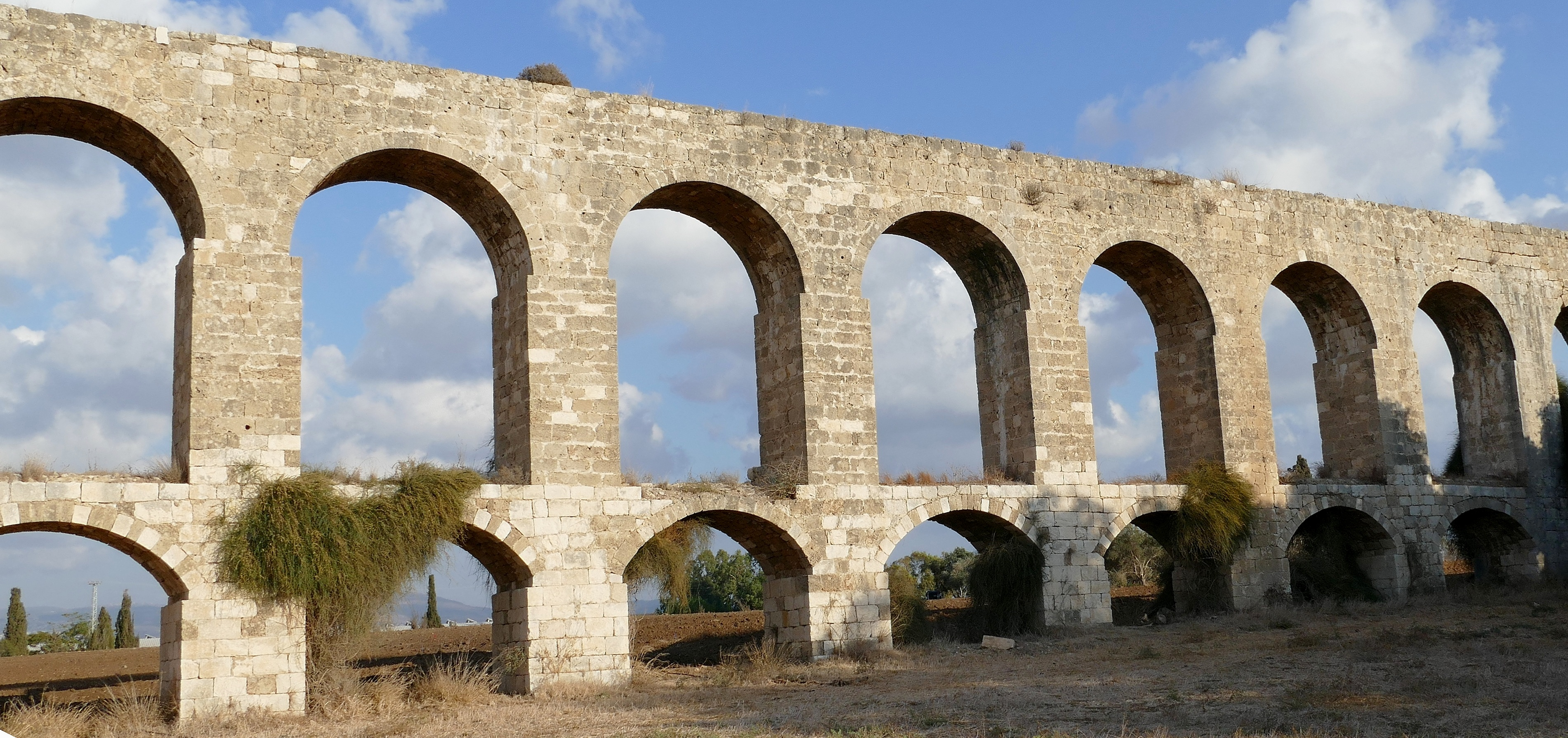
The Acre aqueduct

The Acre Aqueduct (Arabic: قناة عكا المائية, Hebrew: אמת עכו, Acco Aqueduct), better known as Kabri Aqueduct is a now-defunct aqueduct in the Western Galilee region of northern Israel. It was refurbished by Jezzar Pasha, Ottoman ruler of Acre and the Western Galilee from 1775 to 1804. It was destroyed by Napoléon in 1799 during the Siege of Acre. The original used pipes to transport the water. The surviving open-channel structure seen today was completely reconstructed by Jezzar's son, Suleiman from 1814-1815. In 1873, the aqueduct was made operational after thirty years of disrepair by then Acre governor, Ahmad Big Tawfíq, in response to a request to render some service to Bahá'u'lláh, the prophet-founder of the Bahá’í Faith, held as a prisoner in exile in Acre. The city of Acre celebrated the return of water after Bahá'u'lláh's request was granted by firing off one hundred canon blasts. It was operational until 1948. Its source is in the Kabri Spring.

Though mostly underground, portions of the aqueduct are visible above ground, including two well-known sections on Kibbutz Lohamei HaGeta'ot, the most spectacular being to the south, through Kibbutz Shomrat.
