= Silahdar Süleyman Pasha =

19th-century governor of Damascus

Wali of Damascus
- In office February 1812 – May 1816
- Monarch: Mahmud II
- Preceded by: Sulayman Pasha al-Adil
- Succeeded by: Hafiz Amasyali Ali Pasha

Personal details
- Born: Hama
- Died: 1837

Silahdar Süleyman Pasha (Arabic transliteration: Sulaymān Pasha al-Siliḥdār, died 1837) was the Ottoman governor of Damascus Eyalet from February 1812 to May 1816.

== Biography ==
Silahdar was from Hama in central Syria, but his government career was made in the Ottoman capital, Istanbul. He replaced Sulayman Pasha al-Adil as governor of Damascus and his appointment marked the permanent end of a trend whereby local rulers or non-local rulers who made their careers in Syria, such as the al-Azm family or Jazzar Pasha and his mamluk heirs in Acre, were appointed to the governorship.

During his first days as governor, Silahdar faced a rebellion by the janissary commander of the Citadel of Damascus, Ali Agha al-Baghdadi, who refused to accept Silahdar's authority. After a siege of several days, Ali Agha surrendered, was executed and the remaining rebellious janissaries were allowed to leave the city unharmed. In 1813, Silahdar commissioned the Kurdish Dalat cavalry commander of Hama, Mullah Isma'il, to oversee that year's tax collection tour in the province. Silahdar was commended by the Damascene chronicler and Silahdar's contemporary, Hasan Agha al-'Abd, for successfully protecting and provisioning the Hajj caravans of 1813 and 1814 as part of his duty as amir al-hajj (commander of the Hajj caravan); Al-'Abd accompanied Silahdar during the Hajj of 1813.

Silahdar was replaced by Hafiz Amasyali Ali Pasha in May 1816. Silahdar died in 1837.

== Bibliography ==
- Douwes, Dick (2000). The Ottomans in Syria: a history of justice and oppression. I.B. Tauris. ISBN 1860640311.
- Sajdi, Dana (2013). The Barber of Damascus: Nouveau Literacy in the Eighteenth-Century Ottoman Levant. Stanford University Press. ISBN 9780804788281.

Preceded by Sulayman Pasha al-Adil	Wali of Damascus; 1812–1816	Succeeded by Hafiz Amasyali Ali Pasha
