= Khoder Nasser =

Australian sports agent & boxing promoter

Khoder Nasser is an Australian sports agent and boxing promoter who currently represents Sonny Bill Williams and Quade Cooper.

== Background ==
Nasser is of Lebanese descent, hailing from the village of I’aal, south-east of Tripoli. He graduated from the University of Wollongong in New South Wales with a Bachelor of Arts (BA) in economics and politics. Nasser is Muslim, and his father is a former president of the Australian Federation of Islamic Councils. He is married and lives near his parents in Sydney.

== Sports agent ==
Nasser met Anthony Mundine in the 1990s and the two connected, with Nasser eventually falling into a role as his manager. In 2000, Mundine retired from rugby league, becoming a professional boxer that same year. Nasser and Mundine ended their business relationship in July 2012.

In 2008, Nasser became the manager of Sonny Bill Williams. Later that year, Williams left rugby league club the Canterbury-Bankstown Bulldogs mid-season in controversial circumstances and transitioned to rugby union. Williams began a part-time boxing career in 2009.

In 2011, Nasser became the manager of Quade Cooper. He also manages Cory Paterson. Cooper began a part-time boxing career in 2013.

In 2013, Williams returned to rugby league. However, his contract was delayed as Nasser was not an accredited National Rugby League player agent.

In February 2013, a fight Nassar promoted between Williams and Francois Botha was marred in controversy over the scheduled length of the match, WBA accreditation, match-fixing claims and a failed drugs test.
