= Félix Mengin =

19th-century French historian

Félix Mengin ( ) was a French trader, temporary French consul and writer in Cairo.

He came to Egypt with Napoléon Bonaparte's mission. He wrote several books about the history of Egypt, Saudi Arabia and other Arab countries including a History of Egypt in era of Mohammed Ali Pasha.

== Books ==
- Histoire de l'Égypte sous le gouvernement de Mohammed-Aly Félix Mengin, Joseph Agoub (1795-1832), Edme-François Jomard - 1823
