= Arraba, Jenin =

Arraba عرابة
- Municipality type B
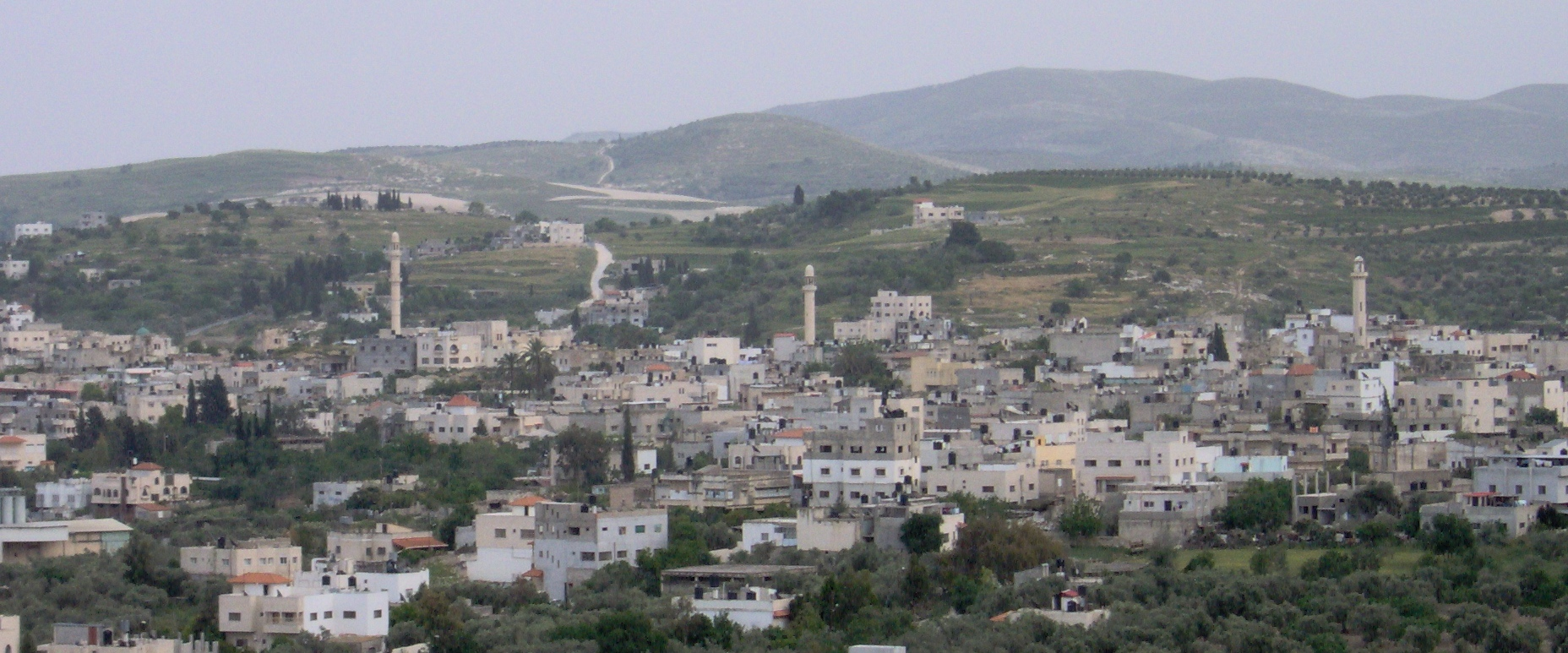
- Northern view of Arraba, 2007

- Location of Arraba within Palestine
- Coordinates: 32°24′16″N 35°12′12″E
- Palestine grid: 169/201
- State: Palestine
- Governorate: Jenin

Government
  - Type: Municipality (from 1995)
  - Head of Municipality: Ahmad al-ʻArdah

Area
  - Total: 39.6 km^{2} (15.3 sq mi)

Population (2017)
  - Total: 11,479
  - Density: 290/km^{2} (751/sq mi)
- Name meaning: "A steppe"

Arraba (Arabic: عرّابة ʻArrābah), also Arrabah, Arrabeh or Arrabet Jenin, is a Palestinian town in the northern West Bank located 12 kilometers southwest of Jenin and has an elevation of 350 meters above sea level. According to the Palestinian Central Bureau of Statistics (PCBS) census, Arraba had a population of 11,479 in 2017.

== History ==
The lands of 'Arraba include Khirbet al-Hammam and Tel el-Muhafer, either of which believed to be the site of the Canaanite town Arubboth from the Books of Kings (associated with the Canaanite Rubutu in the Egyptian documents) and the Jewish city Narbata of the Roman period. Tell Dothan is located just north-east of Arraba.

Pottery remains from the late Roman, Byzantine, early Muslim and the Middle Ages have been found here.

In 1226 the geographer Yaqut al-Hamawi noted that the village had a holy place named after the prophet 'Arabil'. During the Crusader period, Arraba appears as one of the settlements marking the eastern boundary of the Caesarea district.

=== Ottoman era ===
Arraba was incorporated into the Ottoman Empire in 1517 along with the rest of Palestine. Throughout Ottoman rule, Arraba saw waves of immigration from the region, including from Hebron, Acre, and Egypt. During the 16th and 17th centuries, it was controlled by the Turabay dynasty (1517–1683), whose territory spanned a large part of northern Palestine. In the census of 1596, Arraba was administratively part of the nahiye (subdistrict) of Jabal Shami in the Nablus Sanjak. It had a population of 81 households and 31 bachelors, all Muslim. The inhabitants paid a fixed tax rate of 33.3% on agricultural products, that was 17,040 akçe on wheat, 1,500 on barley, 2,683 for summer crops, 1,500 for olive trees, 1,000 for occasional revenues, 1,000 for goats and beehives, 30 for an olive oil press, and 3,840 for adat rijaliyya, (Note: Customary tax on subjects (only for Muslims in Nablus Sanjak)) totalling 29,575 akçe. In 1648-50 the Turkish traveler Evliya Çelebi noted the village contained 100 Muslim houses and that its taxes were allocated to the governor of Nablus.

In 1838 Arraba was noted as a village in the Sha'rawiya al-Sharqiya district, north of Nablus. Arraba is the origin of the Abd al-Hadi family, once a leading landowning family in the districts of Afula, Baysan, Jenin, and Nablus, and was their seat of power as a throne village (qaryat kursi). The clan was traditionally opposed to the Tuqan family of Nablus. In the 1850s the Ottoman rulers withdrew their soldiers from the district (to be used in the Crimean War), and hence open hostility ensued between the different Palestinian factions. The Abd al-Hadis sacked several villages, some of the results were shown to the British consul Rogers when he visited Arraba in 1856.

In April 1859 a coalition of Ottoman troops and local leaders opposed to the Abd al-Hadi clan, stormed Arraba. Members of the Abd al-Hadi clan either fled or were captured, while the fortifications of Arraba were razed and the place plundered. By subduing Arraba, the Ottomans had suppressed the last bastion of independent local rule in the Nablus region. French explorer Victor Guérin visited the village in 1870, and described it: "This town is situated on a plateau. [...] It is divided into three quarters, one of which was once surrounded by a wall flanked with small towers. This wall is now in great part destroyed, having been overthrown in a siege sustained some years ago during a revolt against the Caimacam of Nablus". In 1870/1871, an Ottoman census listed the village in the nahiye of al-Sha'rawiyya al-Sharqiyya.

In 1882, the PEF's Survey of Western Palestine described Arraba as "a very large village on the south slope of a ridge, the northern houses on high ground. There is a small mosque in the centre, and one or two large buildings, including the Sheikh's house. The water supply is entirely from wells within the village, and on the road-side towards the north. There is a ridge of very barren rock between the village on the south and the plain (Merj 'Arrabeh) on the north. Scattered olives grow round the village, but the immediate neighbourhood is very bare. The villagers are turbulent and rich, owning very fine lands in the northern plain." In 1913-14 the Ottomans built a section of the Jezreel Valley railway (itself a branch of the now-defunct Hejaz railway) that passed through Arraba and ended in Nablus.

=== British Mandate era ===
In the 1922 census of Palestine, conducted by the British Mandate authorities, Arraba had a population of 2,196, all Muslim. In the 1931 census it had increased to a population of 2,500, still all Muslim, in 554 inhabited houses. In the 1945 statistics the population was 3,810 Muslims with 39,901 dunams of land, according to an official land and population survey. five dunams were used for citrus or bananas, 3,568 dunams were used for plantations and irrigable land, 23,357 dunams for cereals, while 315 dunams were built-up (urban) land.

=== Jordanian era ===
In the wake of the 1948 Arab–Israeli War, and after the 1949 Armistice Agreements, Arraba came under Jordanian rule. It was annexed by Jordan in 1950.

In 1961, the population of Arraba was 4,865.

=== Post-1967 ===
Since the Six-Day War in 1967, Arraba, like the rest of the West Bank, has been under Israeli military occupation.

== Holy Sites ==
The holy tomb of ash-Sheikh 'Arabil is located within a cave under the minbar of the town's central mosque, constructed in 1819 by Hussein 'Abd al-Hadi. Before the mosque's construction, the location was identified as "Nabi Allah A'arabil" in the land known as Hakurat A'arabil, as recorded by early 19th century Ottoman records. Al-Nabulsi, visiting in 1690 and referring to the site as "a-Nebi A'arabl," recorded that he was a descendant of Jacob and mentioned an ornate structure with a remarkable dome present at the time. The name 'Arabil is speculated to be a variation of Reuben, Jacob's son, known in some places as Rubil, while Ihsan al-Nimer referred to him as "'Arabim." This saint is celebrated for miraculous deeds, and according to one tradition, Arraba is named after him.

== Gallery ==
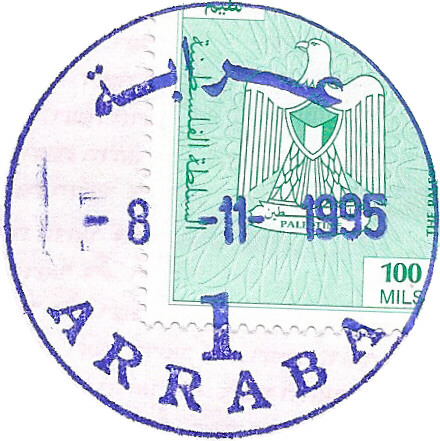
Rubber postmark of Arraba

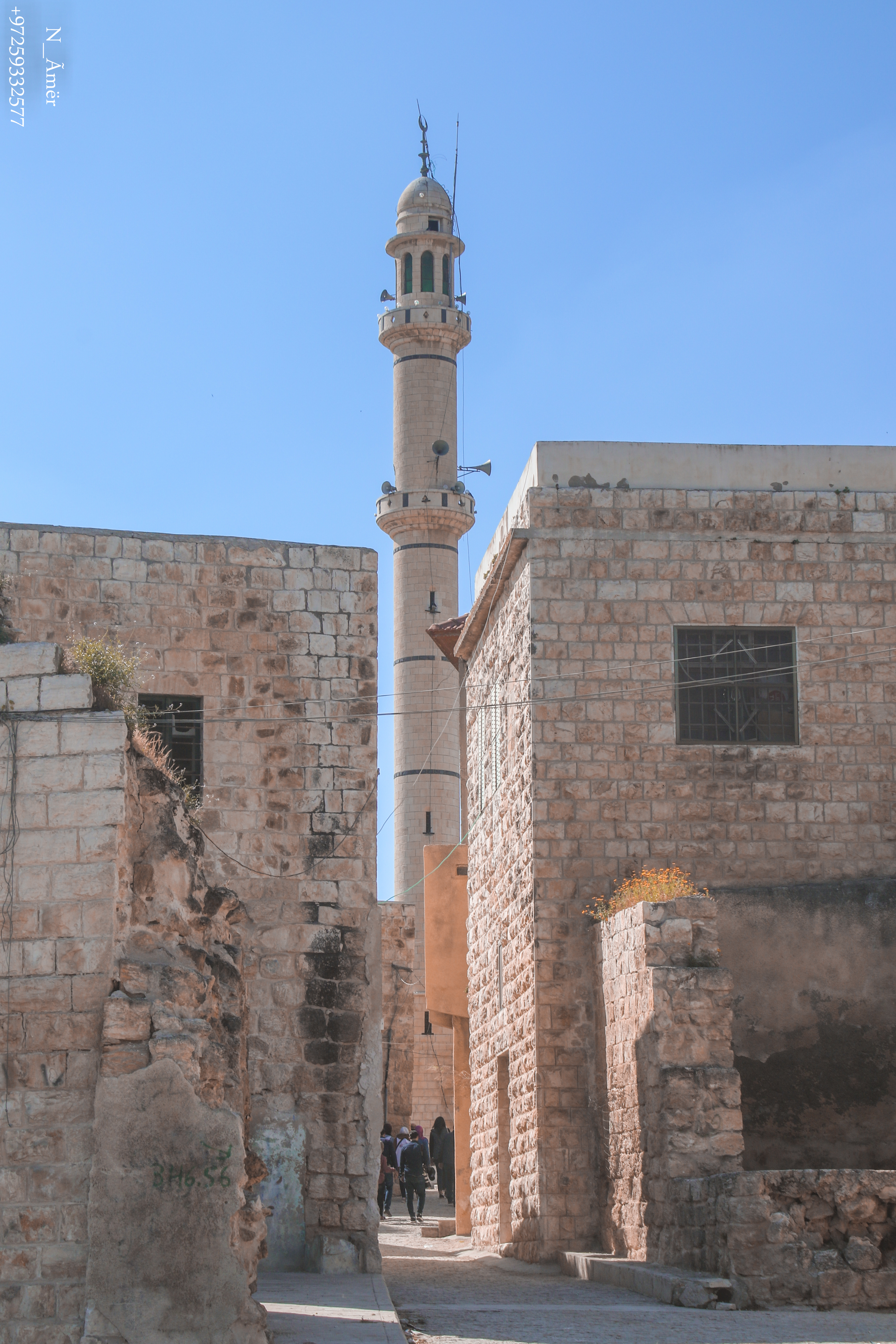
The old center

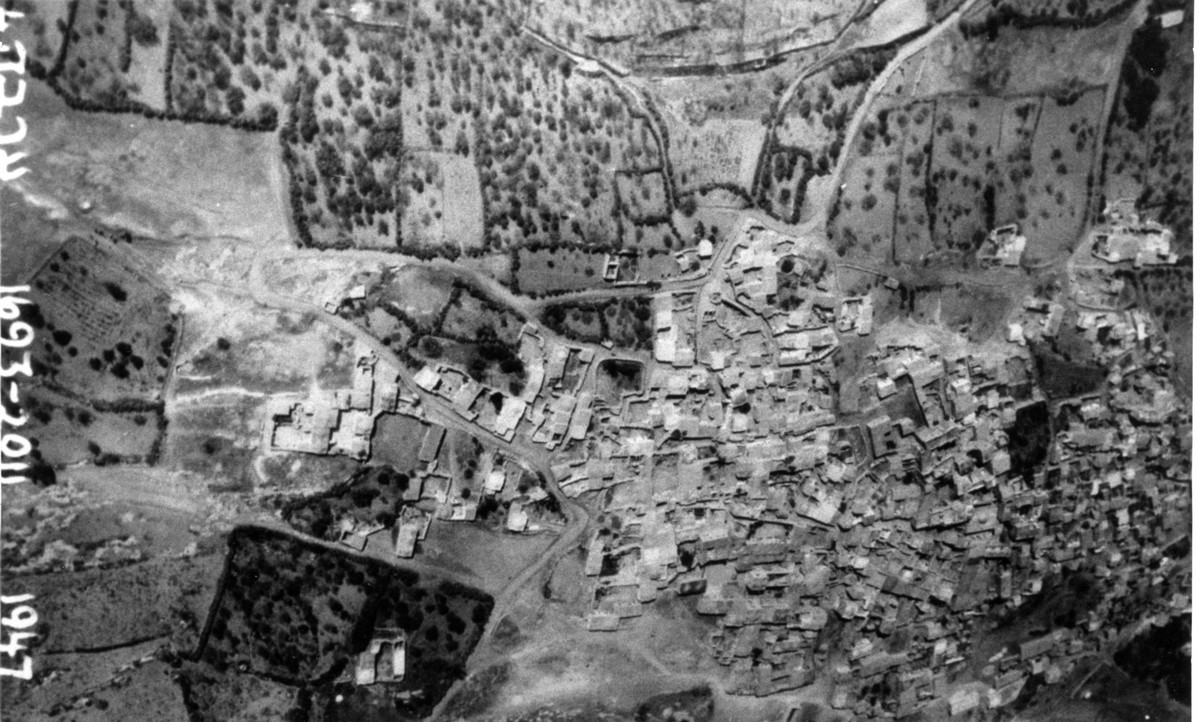

== Notable residents ==
- Husayn Abd al-Hadi, d. 1835, powerful rural chief and governor of Sidon
- Sami Taha, 1916–1947, labor leader in British Mandatory Palestine
- Abu Ali Mustafa, 1938–2001, secretary-general of the Popular Front for the Liberation of Palestine
- Hasan Abu-Libdeh, b. 1954, statistician and Palestinian Authority official
- Khader Adnan, 1978–2023, Palestinian Islamic Jihad activist who died after hunger strike in Israeli prison

== Bibliography ==
- Barron, J.B., ed. (1923). Palestine: Report and General Abstracts of the Census of 1922. Government of Palestine.
- Conder, C.R.; Kitchener, H.H. (1882). The Survey of Western Palestine: Memoirs of the Topography, Orography, Hydrography, and Archaeology. Vol. 2. London: Committee of the Palestine Exploration Fund.
- Doumani, B. (1995). Rediscovering Palestine: Merchants and Peasants in Jabal Nablus. University of California Press.
- Finn, J. (1878). Stirring Times. Vol. 1. London: C.K. Paul & co.
- Finn, J. (1878). Stirring Times. Vol. 2. London: C.K. Paul & co.
- Gilbar, Gad G. (1990). Ottoman Palestine, 1800-1914: Studies in Economic and Social History. Brill Archive. ISBN 90-04-07785-5.
- Government of Jordan, Department of Statistics (1964). First Census of Population and Housing. Volume I: Final Tables; General Characteristics of the Population (PDF).
- Government of Palestine, Department of Statistics (1945). Village Statistics, April, 1945.
- Guérin, V. (1875). Description Géographique Historique et Archéologique de la Palestine (in French). Vol. 2: Samarie, pt. 2. Paris: L'Imprimerie Nationale.
- Hadawi, S. (1970). Village Statistics of 1945: A Classification of Land and Area ownership in Palestine. Palestine Liberation Organization Research Center.
- Hütteroth, W.-D.; Abdulfattah, K. (1977). Historical Geography of Palestine, Transjordan and Southern Syria in the Late 16th Century. Erlanger Geographische Arbeiten, Sonderband 5. Erlangen, Germany: Vorstand der Fränkischen Geographischen Gesellschaft. ISBN 3-920405-41-2.
- Mills, E., ed. (1932). Census of Palestine 1931. Population of Villages, Towns and Administrative Areas. Jerusalem: Government of Palestine.
- Na'aman, Nadav (2005). Canaan in the second millennium B.C.E. Eisenbrauns. ISBN 1575061139.
- Palmer, E.H. (1881). The Survey of Western Palestine: Arabic and English Name Lists Collected During the Survey by Lieutenants Conder and Kitchener, R. E. Transliterated and Explained by E.H. Palmer. Committee of the Palestine Exploration Fund.
- Poujoulat, B. [in French] (1861). La vérité sur la Syrie et l'expédition française. Gaume frères et J. Duprey.
- Robinson, E.; Smith, E. (1841). Biblical Researches in Palestine, Mount Sinai and Arabia Petraea: A Journal of Travels in the year 1838. Vol. 3. Boston: Crocker & Brewster.
- Rogers, Mary Eliza (1865). Domestic life in Palestine. Poe & Hichcock.
- Schölch, A. (1993). Palestine in Transformation, 1856-1882: Studies in Social, Economic, and Political Development (PDF). Institute for Palestine Studies. ISBN 0-88728-234-2.
- Stephan, St. H. (1936). "Evliya Tshelebi's travels in Palestine IV". Quarterly of The Department of Antiquities in Palestine. 6 (2). Annotated by L. A. Mayer: 84–97.
- Zertal, A. (1984). Arubboth, Hepher, and the Third Solomonic District (in Hebrew).
- Zertal, A. (2016). The Manasseh Hill Country Survey. Vol. 3. Boston: BRILL. ISBN 978-9004312302.
