= Mustafa Agha Barbar =

Ottoman Syrian statesman and military officer (1767–1835)

Mustafa Agha Barbar El Korek (1767 – 28 April 1835) was an Ottoman Syrian statesman and military officer who was governor of the Ottoman province of Tripoli, ruling between 1800–08, 1810–20 and 1821-35.

== Name ==
The middle word in his name, Agha, is actually a title derived from the Persian and Turkish word for master. It was a title for a civil or military officer in the Ottoman Empire, and was placed after the name of such military functionaries.

== Biography ==
Barbar was originally a peasant from al-Qalamoun, in the Koura District. At the beginning of his career he was in the service of Emir Hasan Shihab (the brother of Emir Bashir Shihab II). By virtue of his acumen, bravery, skill and energy, according to historian Mikhail Mishaqa, Barbar attained high office and acquired standing among the viziers and subjects. It is said that he was the chief antagonist of Emir Bashir Shihab II around Abdullah Pasha al-Azm (Wali of Damascus).

Barbar was appointed governor of Tripoli by the Ottomans in 1798. In the early 19th century, he had extensive restoration work done on the Citadel of Tripoli (castle of Saint Gilles), resulting in its present state. Later on, he endowed large portions of his property in Tripoli to his wives, relatives and slaves (mamluks), shortly after his grip on power was challenged. He also endowed property in Tripoli for the building of a canal and two water fountains, in order to enhance his local image. His rule in Tripoli was challenged by Kunj Yusuf Pasha, Wali of Damascus, in 1808, but Barbar withstood the siege with support from Albanian mercenaries.

Between 1809 and 1813, Barbar, who hated the Alawites, attacked the Kalbiyya tribe from among them with "marked savagery." His principal enemy was the semi-autonomous Alawite sheikh of Safita, Saqr al-Mahfuz. In 1816, Barbar built the fortress of Iaal. That same year, soldiers serving him ravaged a number of Ismaili Shia villages in the Nusayriyya Mountains, which proved disastrous for the Ismailis. This included the final destruction of the Al-Kahf Castle.

Between 1820 and 1825, an Ottoman imperial decree went forth, ordering for Barbar's execution. He came to the Mount Lebanon Emirate, seeking asylum with Emir Bashir, who appointed a residence for him and his people in the village of Shwayfat (Aley District), until he could obtain a pardon through the offices of the governor of Egypt, Muhammad Ali (with whom Emir Bashir was allied). A friendship thus was formed between the former enemies. In October, 1833, Barbar was dismissed from office and arrested by the new Egyptian authorities. Muhammad Ali of Egypt was now in control, as opposed to the previous Ottomans. Barbar was arrested for his levying the ‘awayid, a tax levied to support the officeholders from his subjects, which was prohibited by the new Egyptian authorities.

Barbar died April 28, 1835, after Ali Basha Al Asaad killed him and took his place to rule.

Some of his modern descendants now live in Tripoli and Iaal, Lebanon.

== See also ==
- Ottoman Syria
