= Khaldieh =

Village in Zgharta District, in the Northern Governorate of Lebanon

- Location within Lebanon
- Coordinates: 34°22′11″N 35°54′32″E
- Country: Lebanon
- Governorate: North Governorate
- Districts of Lebanon: Zgharta District
- Time zone: +2
  - Summer (DST): +3

Khaldieh is a village in Zgharta District, in the Northern Governorate of Lebanon. Its population is Maronite Catholic.
