= Mikhail Mishaqa =

19th-century Lebanese historian

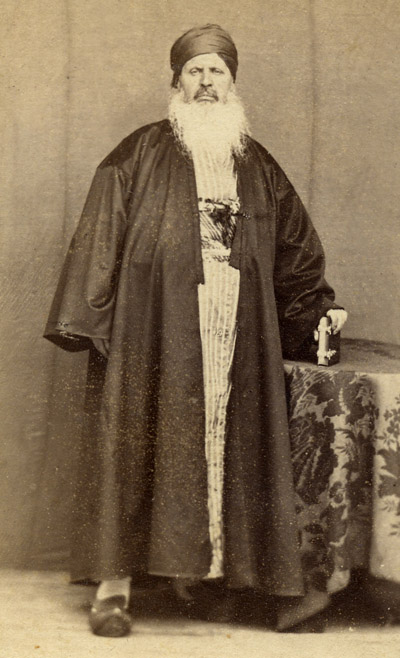
- Mikhail Mishaqa, the first U.S. Vice Consul in Damascus, 1859
- Born: March 20, 1800; Rechmaya, Emirate of Mount Lebanon, Ottoman Syria
- Died: July 19, 1888 (aged 88); Beirut, Beirut vilayet, Ottoman Syria
- Citizenship: Ottoman Empire
- Occupations: Diplomat, physician, historian, musical theorist, businessman, first U.S. vice-consul in Damascus, 1859–1870
- Known for: historian of modern Ottoman Syria, musicologist

Mikhail Mishaqa, or Michael Meshaka (Arabic: ميخائيل مشاقة; March 20, 1800 – July 19, 1888), was a Lebanese academic, diplomat and musician reputed to be the first historian of modern Ottoman Syria and the "virtual founder of the twenty-four equal quarter tone scale". His memoir of the 1860 Mount Lebanon and Damascus civil war is valuable to historians as the only account written by a survivor of the massacre of Syrian Christians in Damascus. In 1859, he was appointed vice-consul of the United States in Damascus.

== Personal life ==
Mikhail's great-grandfather, Jirjis Mishaqa I, converted to Greek Catholicism. Jirjis' father, Youssef Petraki (Greek: Ιωσήφ Πετράκη), an ethnic Greek and Orthodox Christian, moved from Corfu, Greece to Tripoli, in modern Lebanon to pursue the silk trade. As such, Petraki, named himself after an Arabic term describing the process of filtering silk fibres, mishaqa (مشقة). Mikhail's father, Jirjis Mishaqa II, moved to Deir al-Qamar, then controlled by the Shihabs, to escape the religious repression of al-Jazzar, the governor of Sidon. Mishaqa’s wife, Elizabeth, was the daughter of a Greek Catholic from Damascus.

In 1848, Mikhail Mishaqa converted from Greek Catholicism to Protestantism, after having met with American Protestant missionaries and reading a translation of Evidence of the Truth of the Christian Religion... by Alexander Keith.

== Career ==
Mikhail Mishaqa began his career as a goldsmith but became a scribe and then chief treasurer for the Amir of Mount Lebanon, Bashir II's household. According to Leila Fawaz, Mikhail was well-educated:

"At the first opportunity he showed off his knowledge and the ignorance of the offender. In such ways, Mishaqa continued to educate himself. He taught himself medicine and became a doctor."

According to ethnomusicologist Habib Hassan Touma, Mishaqa was the first theorist to propose a division of the octave into roughly twenty-four equal intervals (24-tone equal temperament, quarter tone scale,), this being the current basis of the Arab tone system. However, Mishaqa's "Essay on the Art of Music for the Emir Shihāb", written between 1830 and 1840, dealt with this proposition, but also mentioned that his teacher Sheikh Muhammad al-‘Attār (1764–1828) was already familiar with the concept, although al-‘Attār did not publish his writings on the subject.

Mishaqa's most important works as a historian include "A Response to a Proposition by Beloved Ones" (1873) (الجواب على إقتراح الأحباب, al-Jawāb `alā Iqtirāḥ al-Aḥbāb) and "History of events which took place in Syria on its coast and the Mount in 1782-1841" (1843) (ـاريـخ حـوادث جـرت بـالـشـام و سـواحـل بـر الـشـام و الـجـبـل، 1782-1841 م Ta’rih Hawadit Jarat bil-Sham wa-Sawahil Barr al-Sham wa-l-Jabal, 1782-1841 m).

== See also ==
- Maqam
- Protestantism in Lebanon

== Sources ==
- Habib Hassan Touma (1996). The Music of the Arabs, trans. Laurie Schwartz. Portland, Oregon: Amadeus Press. ISBN 0-931340-88-8.
- Maalouf, Shireen (2003). "Mikhā'il Mishāqa: Virtual Founder of the Twenty-Four Equal Quartertone Scale", Journal of the American Oriental Society, Vol. 123, No. 4. (October–December 2003), pp. 835–840.
- Zachs, Fruma (2001). "Mikhail Mishaqa - The First Historian of Modern Syria", British Journal of Middle Eastern Studies, Vol. 28, No. 1 (May 2001), pp. 67–87.
