= Old city of Damascus =

Historic city centre of Damascus, Syria

UNESCO World Heritage Site
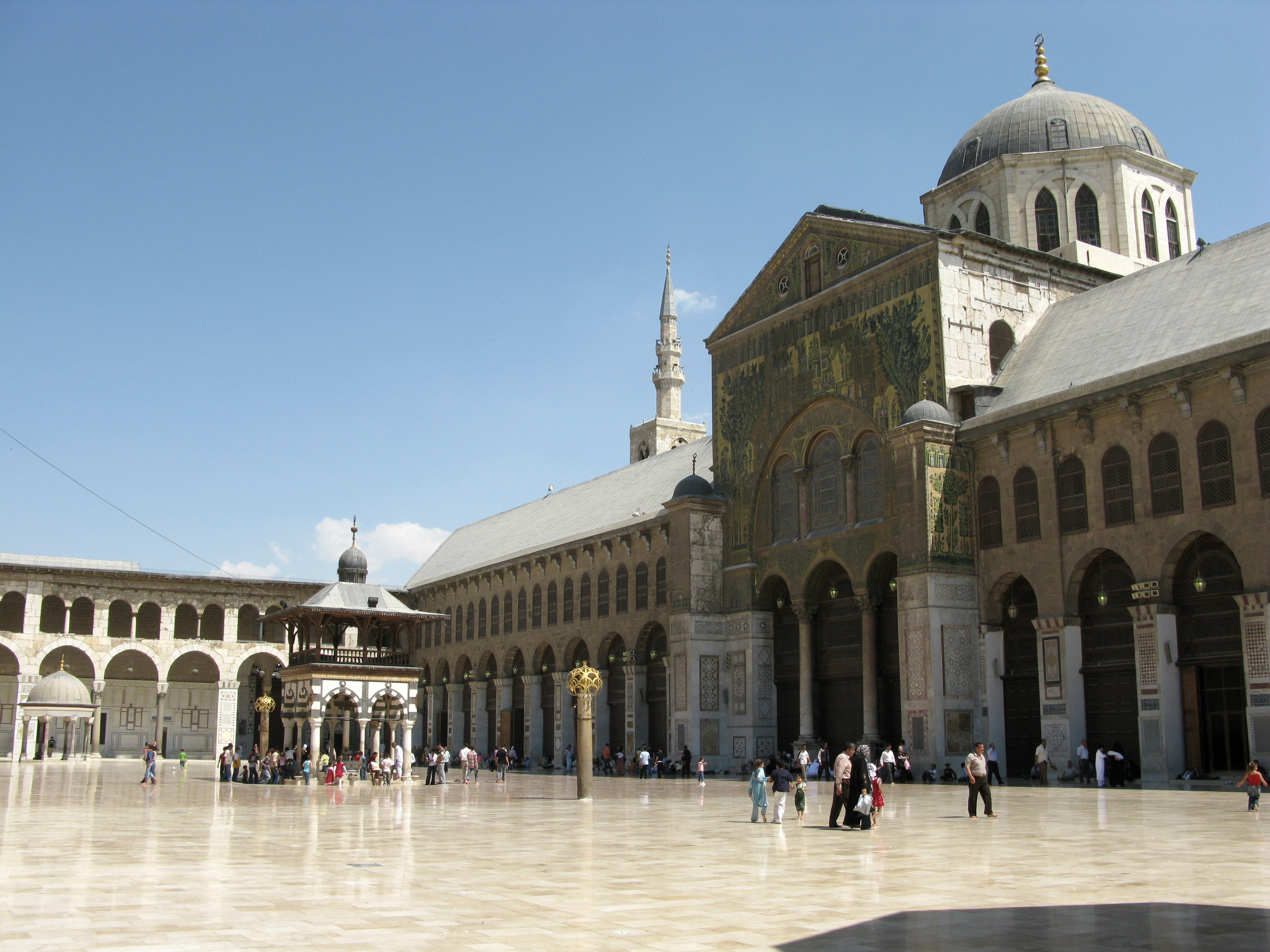
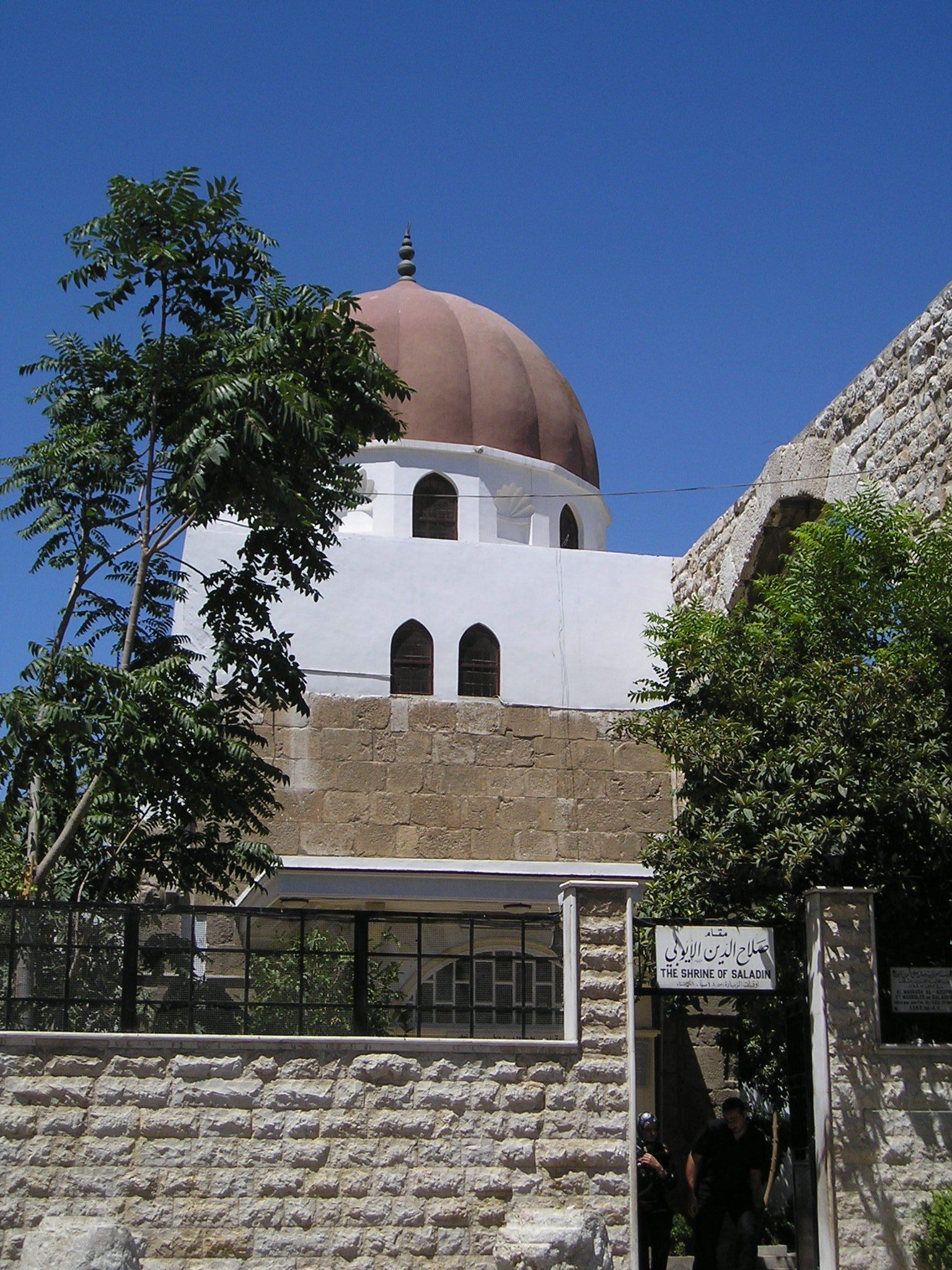
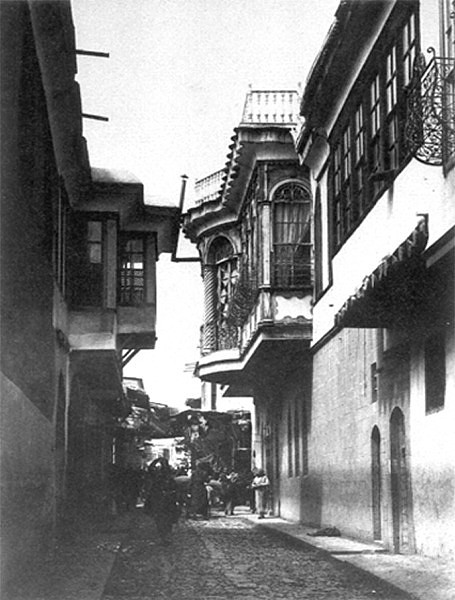
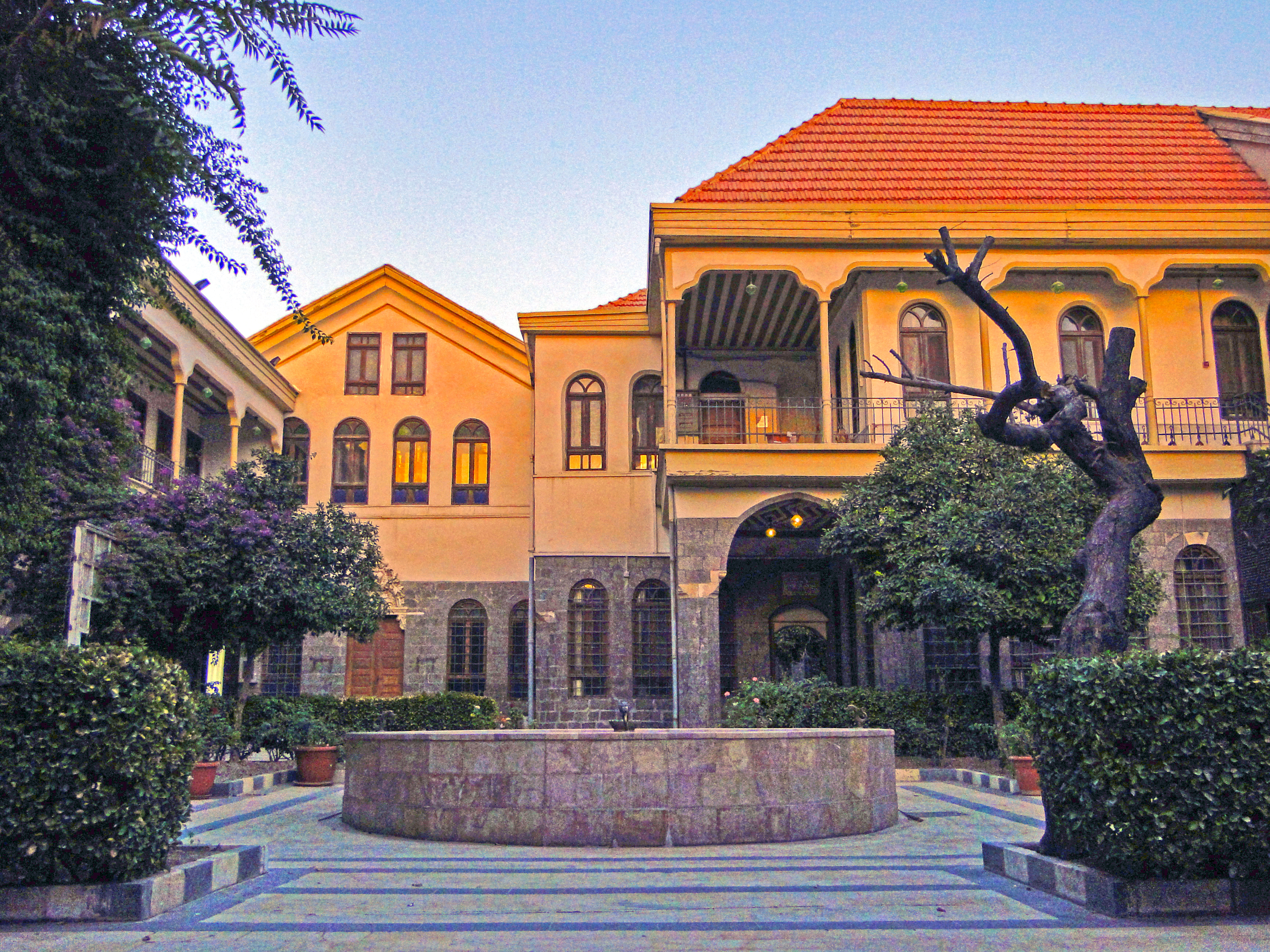
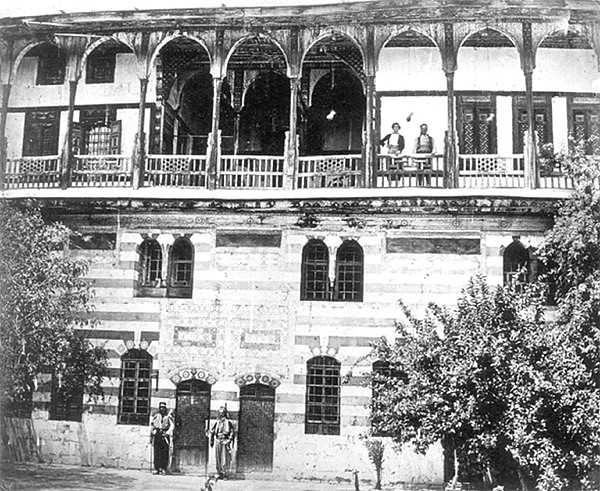
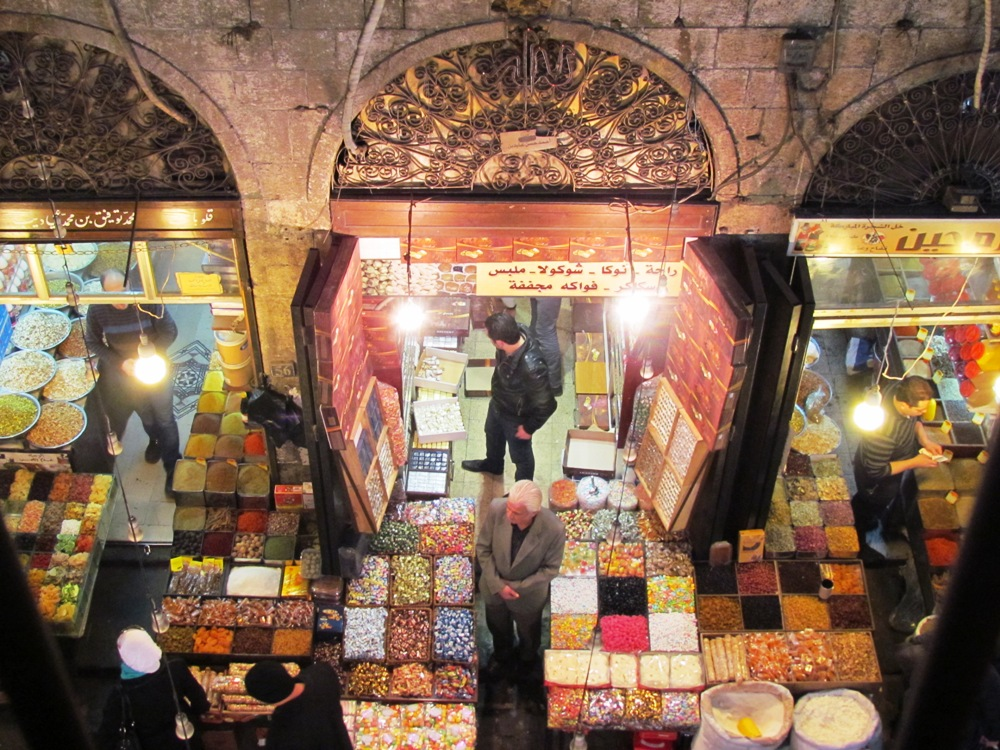

- Location within Syria Location within West and Central Asia
- Location: Damascus, Syria
- Includes: Umayyad Mosque, Azm Palace, Citadel of Damascus
- Criteria: Cultural: (i), (ii), (iii), (iv), (vi)
- Reference: 20bis
- Inscription: 1979 (3rd Session)
- Extensions: 2011
- Endangered: 2013–2018
- Area: 86.12 ha (0.3325 sq mi)
- Buffer zone: 42.60 ha (0.1645 sq mi)
- Coordinates: 33°30′41″N 36°18′23″E

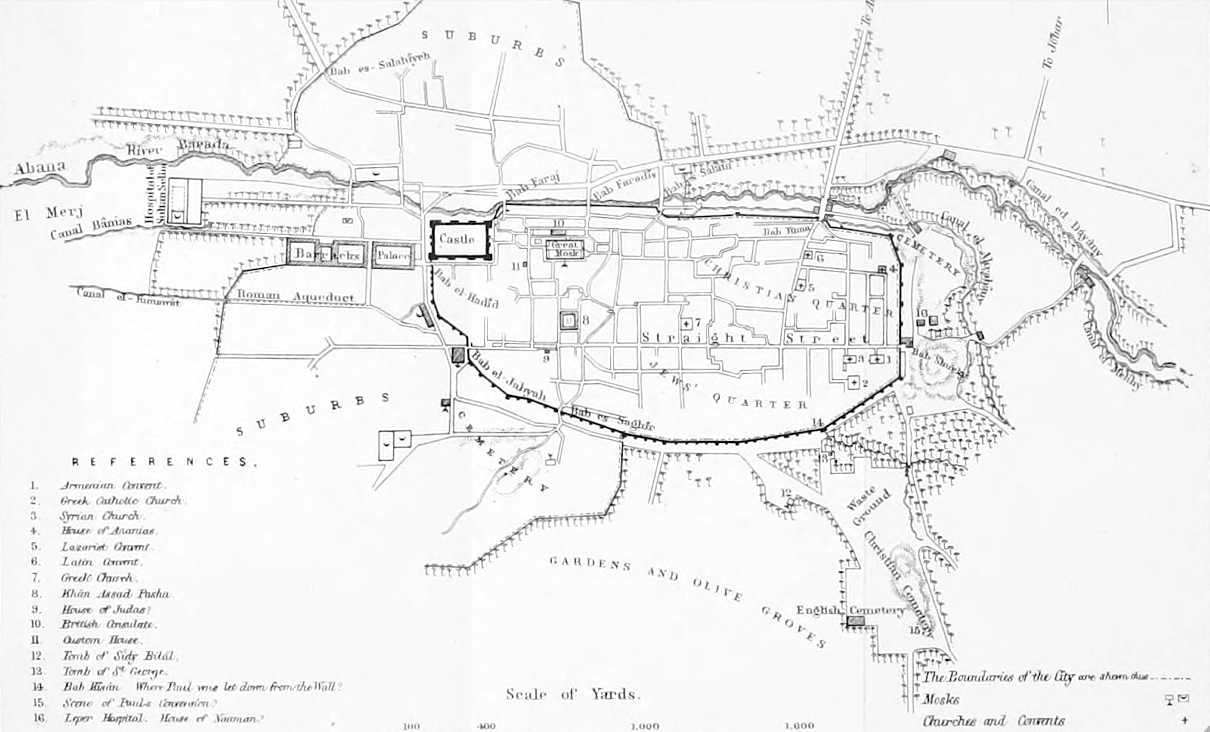
Map of Damascus in 1855

The old city of Damascus (Arabic: دِمَشْق ٱلْقَدِيمَة, romanized: Dimašq al-Qadīmah) is the historic city centre of Damascus, Syria. The old city, which is one of the oldest continuously inhabited cities in the world, contains numerous archaeological sites, including some historical churches and mosques. Many cultures have left their mark, especially Hellenistic, Roman, Byzantine and Islamic. In 1979, the historical center of the city, surrounded by walls of Roman era, was declared a World Heritage Site by UNESCO. In June 2013, UNESCO included all Syrian sites on the list of World Heritage in Danger to warn of the risks to which they were exposed because of the Syrian civil war. Within it lies the monumental Umayyad mosque, one of the largest and oldest mosques in the world.

== Origins and founding ==
Lying on the south bank of Barada River, the ancient city was founded in the 3rd millennium B.C. The horizontal diameter of the oval is about 1.5 km (0.93 mi) which is known as Damascus Straight Street, while the vertical diameter (Latin: Cardus Maximus) is about 1 km (0.62 mi). With an approximate area of 86.12 hectares (212.8 acres; 0.8612 square kilometres), the ancient city was enclosed within a historic wall of 4.5 km (2.8 mi) in circuit that was mainly built by the Romans, then fortified by the Ayyubids and Mamluks.

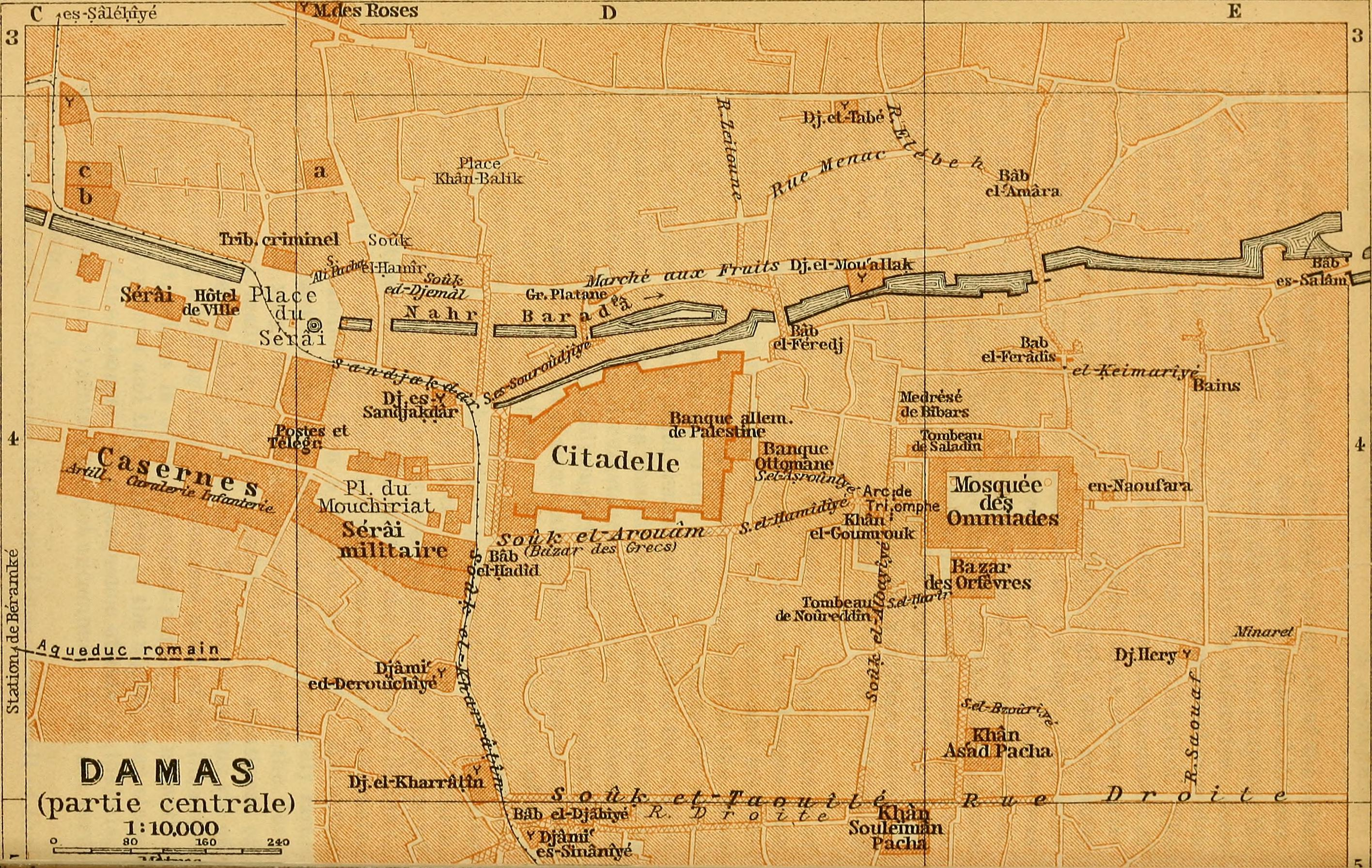
1906 map in French

The first mentioning of Damascus was as "Ta-ms-qu" in the second millennium BC, it was situated in an Amorite region in the middle of a conflict zone between the Hittites and Egyptians. The city was tributary to these powers until the emergence of the Sea Peoples in 1200 BC whose raids helped in weakening the arch rivals. Consequently, the Semitic Arameans managed to establish the independent state of Aram-Damascus (11th century – 733 BC), naming the main city as 'Dimashqup' or 'Darmeseq'.

== Historical timeline ==
Throughout its history, Damascus has been part of the following states:

- c. 2500–15th century BC, Amorites
- 15th century BC–late 12th century BC, New Kingdom of Egypt
- late 12th century BC–732 BCE, Aram-Damascus
- 732 BC–609 BC, Assyria
- 609 BC–539 BC, Babylonia
- 539 BC–332 BC, Persian Achaemenid Empire
- 332 BC–323 BC, Macedonian Empire
- 323 BC–301 BC, Antigonid dynasty
- 301 BC–198 BC, Ptolemaic Kingdom
- 198 BC–167 BC, Seleucid Empire
- 167 BC–110 BC, Ituraea (semi-independent from Seleucids)
- 110 BC–85 BC, Decapolis (semi-independent from Seleucids)
- 85 BC–64 BC, Nabataea
- 64 BC–27 BC, Roman Republic
- 27 BC–395 AD, Roman Empire
- 476–608, Byzantine Empire
- 608–622, Sassanid Persia
- 622–634, Byzantine Empire (restored)
  - 529–634, Ghassanids
- 634–661, Rashidun Caliphate
- 661–750, Umayyad Caliphate (Damascus was the capital of the empire)
- 750–885, Abbasid Caliphate
- 885–905, Tulunids
- 905–935, Abbasid Caliphate (restored)
- 935–969, Ikhshidids
- 970–973, Fatimid Caliphate
- 983–1076, Fatimid Caliphate (restored)
- 1076–1104, Seljuq Empire
- 1104–1154, Burid dynasty
- 1154–1174, Zengids
- 1174–1260, Ayyubids
- 1260 March–September, Mongol Empire
- 1260–1521, Mamluk Sultanate
- 1516–1918, Ottoman Empire
- 1918–1920, Occupied Enemy Territory Administration
- 1920–present,Syria:
  - 1920 March–July, Arab Kingdom of Syria
  - 1920–1924, State of Damascus under the French Mandate
  - 1924–1946, French Mandate of Syria
  - 1946–1958, Syrian Republic
  - 1958–1960, United Arab Republic
  - 1961–2024, Ba'athist Syria
  - 2024–present, Syria

== Main sights ==
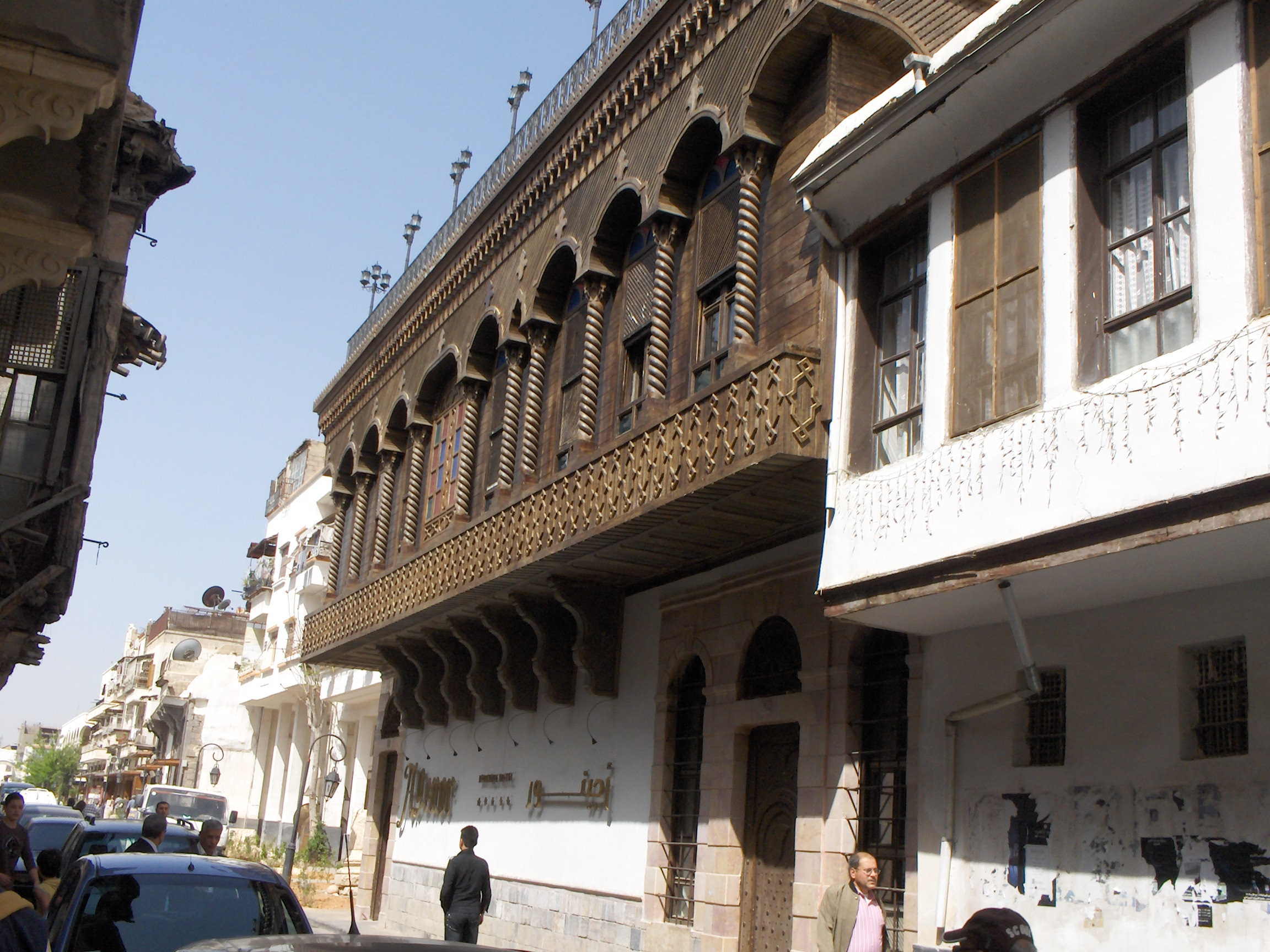
Typical ancient Damascene street

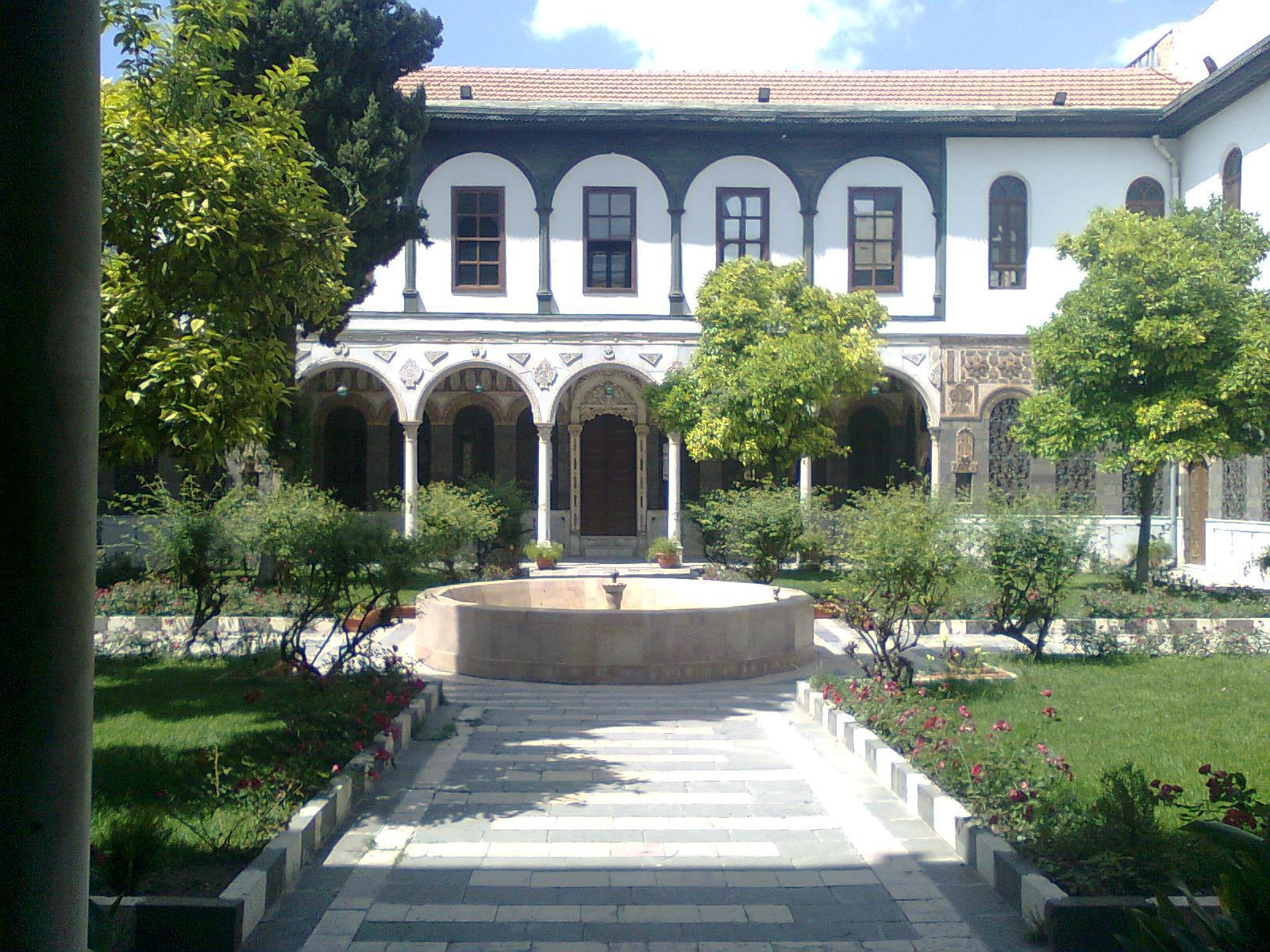
Maktab Anbar with a typical Damascene courtyard

Damascus has a wealth of historical sites dating back to many different periods of the city's history. Since the city has been built up with every passing occupation, it has become almost impossible to excavate all the ruins of Damascus that lie up to 2.4 m (8 ft) below the modern level. The Citadel of Damascus is located in the northwest corner of the Old City. The Damascus Straight Street (referred to in the conversion of St. Paul in Acts 9:11), also known as the Via Recta, was the decumanus (east–west main street) of Roman Damascus, and extended for over 1,500 m (4,900 ft). Today, it consists of the street of Bab Sharqi and the Souk Medhat Pasha, a covered market. The Bab Sharqi street is filled with small shops and leads to the old Christian quarter of Bab Tuma (St. Thomas's Gate). Medhat Pasha Souq is also a main market in Damascus and was named after Midhat Pasha, the Ottoman governor of Syria who renovated the Souk. At the end of the Bab Sharqi street, one reaches the House of Ananias, an underground chapel that was the cellar of Ananias's house. The Umayyad Mosque, also known as the Grand Mosque of Damascus, is one of the largest mosques in the world and also one of the oldest sites of continuous prayer since the rise of Islam. A shrine in the mosque is said to contain the body of St. John the Baptist. The mausoleum where Saladin was buried is located in the gardens just outside the mosque. Sayyidah Ruqayya Mosque, the shrine of the youngest daughter of Husayn ibn Ali, can also be found near the Umayyad Mosque. The ancient district of Amara is also within a walking distance from these sites.

=== Khans ===
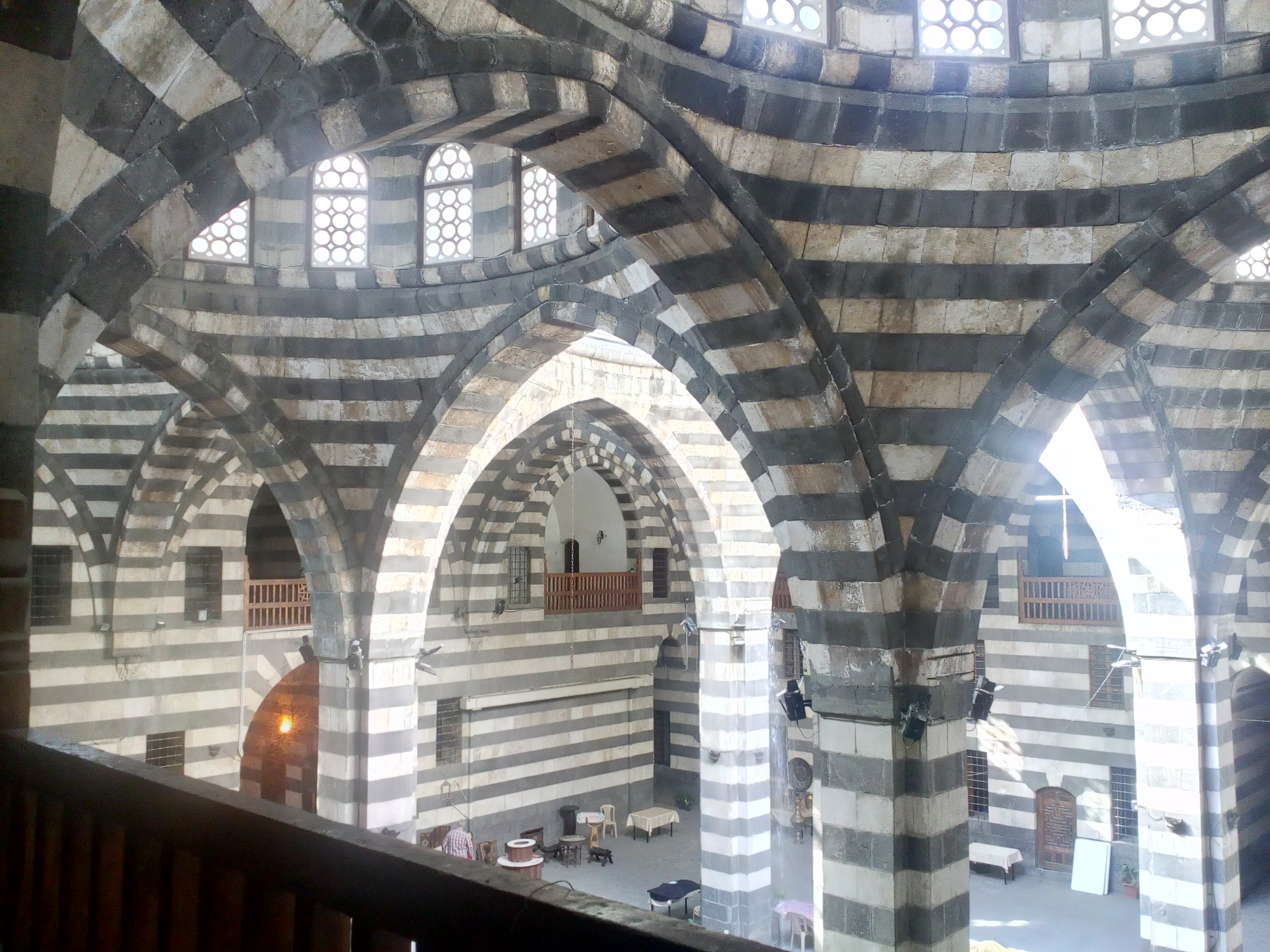
Khan As'ad Pasha

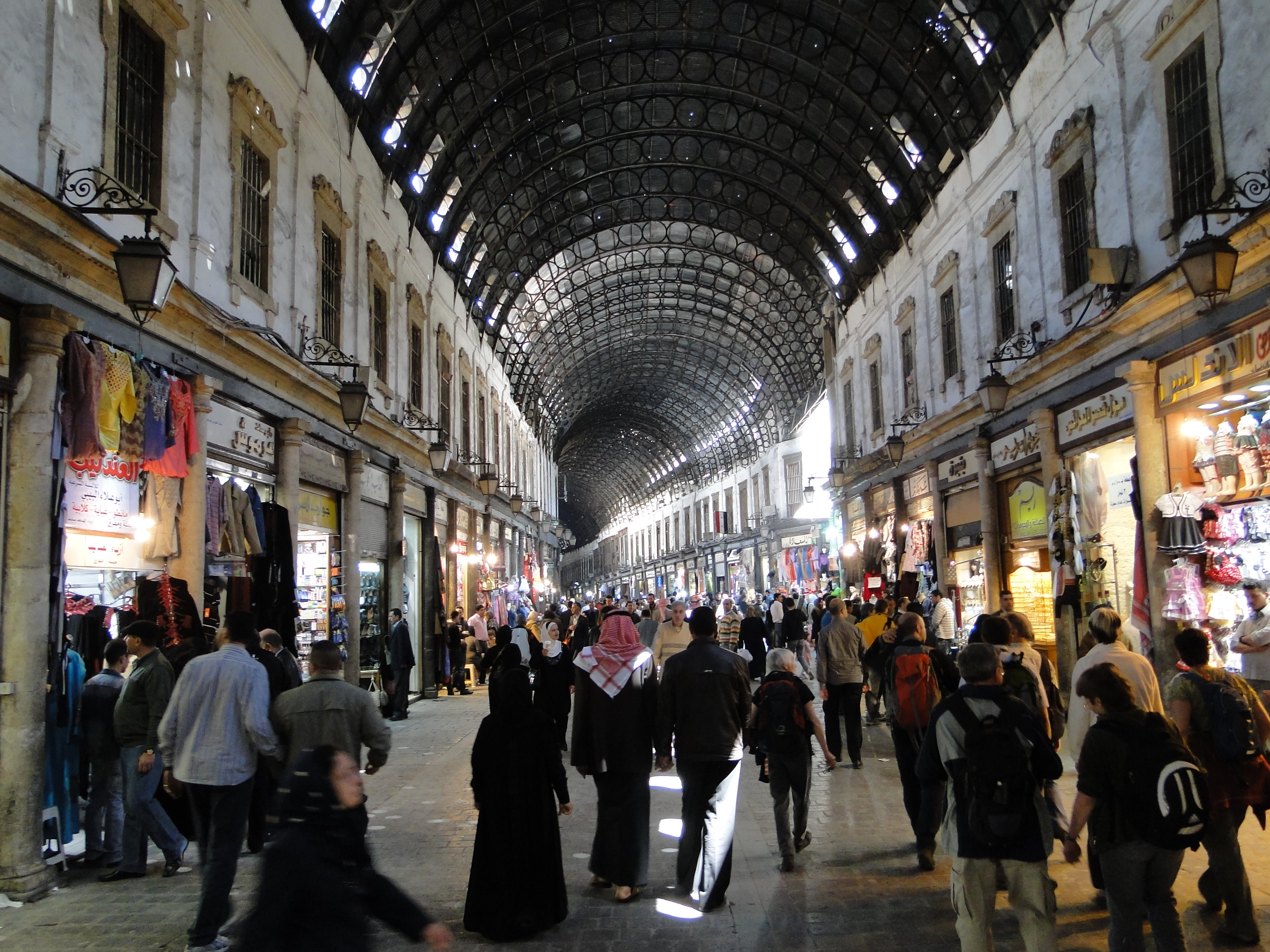
Al-Hamidiyah Souq

- Khan Jaqmaq, completed in 1420.
- Khan al-Harir, completed in 1574.
- Khan Sulayman Pasha, completed in 1736, named after Sulayman Pasha al-Azm.
- Khan As'ad Pasha, completed in 1752, covering an area of 2,500 square metres (27,000 square feet). Situated along Al-Buzuriyah Souq, it was built and named after As'ad Pasha al-Azm.

=== Souqs ===
- Midhat Pasha Souq, (built after 64 BC) named after the then Ottoman governor of Syria (and later Grand Vizier) Midhat Pasha.
- Al-Buzuriyah Souq, 152 metres (499 feet) in length.
- Al-Hamidiyah Souq, built (1780–1884) during the reign of Sultan Abdul Hamid I, the largest and the central souk in Syria, located inside the old walled city of Damascus next to the Citadel. The souq is about 600 meters long and 15 meters wide, and is covered by a 10-meter-tall (33 ft) metal arch.

=== Historic buildings ===
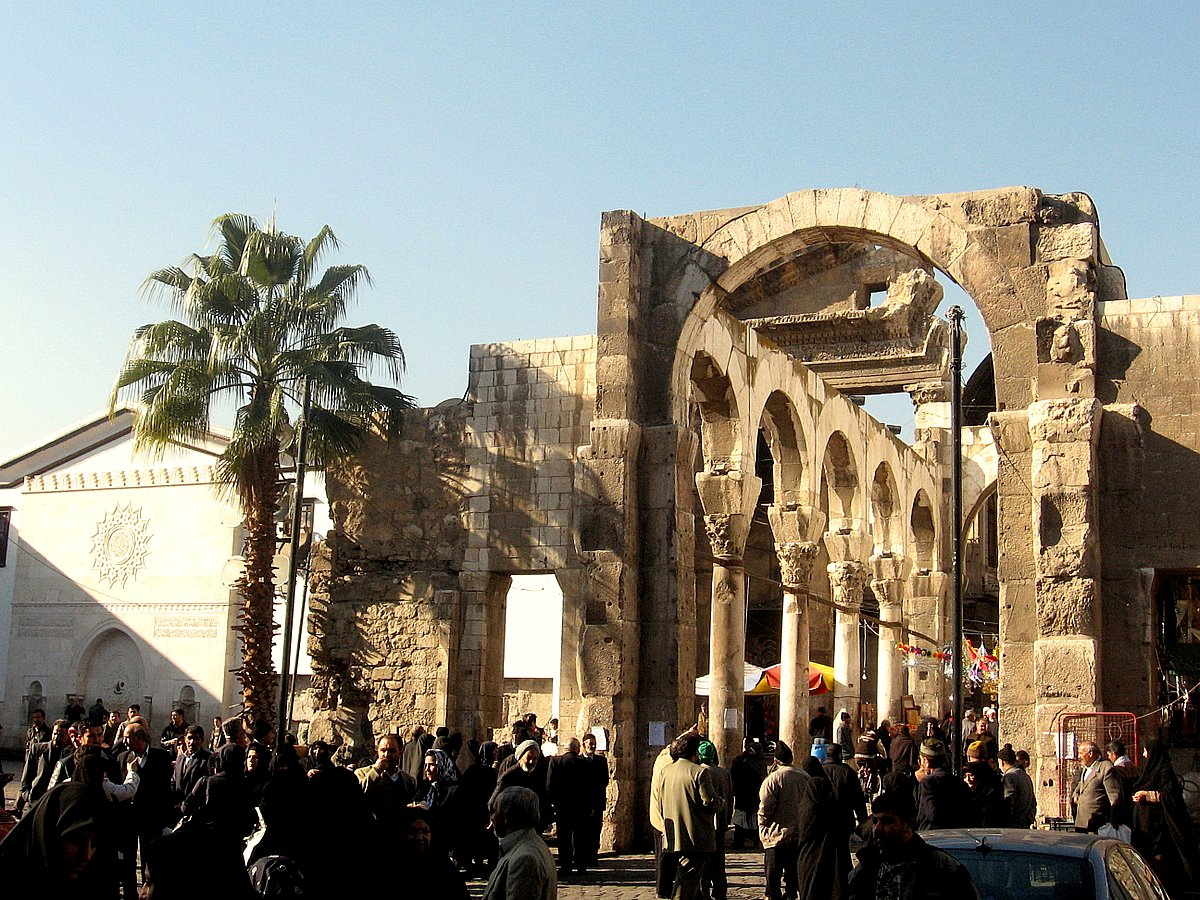
Ruins of the Jupiter Temple at the entrance of Al-Hamidiyah Souq

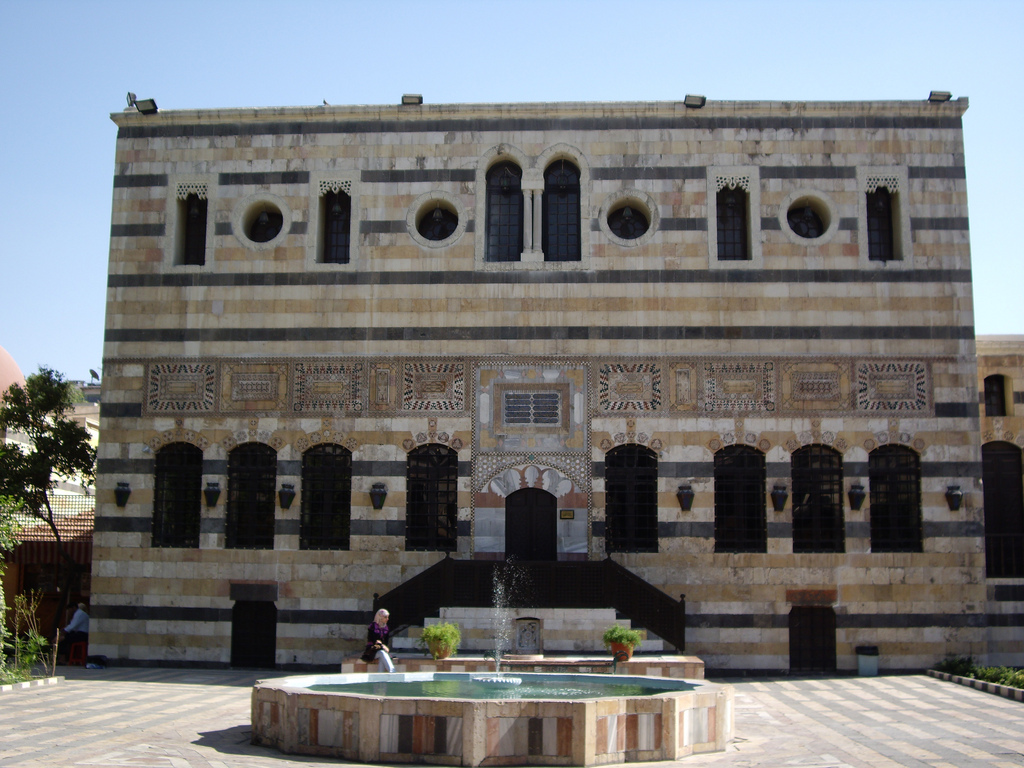
Azm Palace

==== Ancient ====
- Temple of Jupiter, built by the Romans, beginning during the rule of Augustus and completed during the rule of Constantius II, previously a temple dedicated to Hadad-Ramman, the god of thunderstorms and rain.
- Damascus Straight Street (Latin: Via Recta), a Roman street (Decumanus Maximus) which runs from east to west in the old city, 1,500 metres in length.

==== 11th-13th centuries ====
- Citadel of Damascus, built (1076–1078) and (1203–1216) by Turkmen warlord Atsiz ibn Uvaq, and Al-Adil I.
- Nur al-Din Bimaristan, a large medieval bimaristan ("hospital"), built and named after the Zengid Sultan Nur ad-Din in 1154.
- Mausoleum of Saladin, built in 1196, the resting place and grave of the medieval Muslim Ayyubid Sultan Saladin.

==== 17th-19th centuries ====
- Beit al-Mamlouka, a 17th-century Damascene house, serving as a luxury boutique hotel within the old city since 2005.
- Azm Palace, built in 1750 as a residence for the Ottoman governor of Damascus As'ad Pasha al-Azm.
- Beit Al-Sibai house completed 1773-1774 (1184 Hijra).
- Bait Nizam 18th
- Bayt Farhi 18th-19th
- Maktab Anbar, a mid 19th-century Jewish private mansion, restored by the Ministry of Culture in 1976 to serve as a library, exhibition centre, museum and craft workshops.

=== Madrasas ===
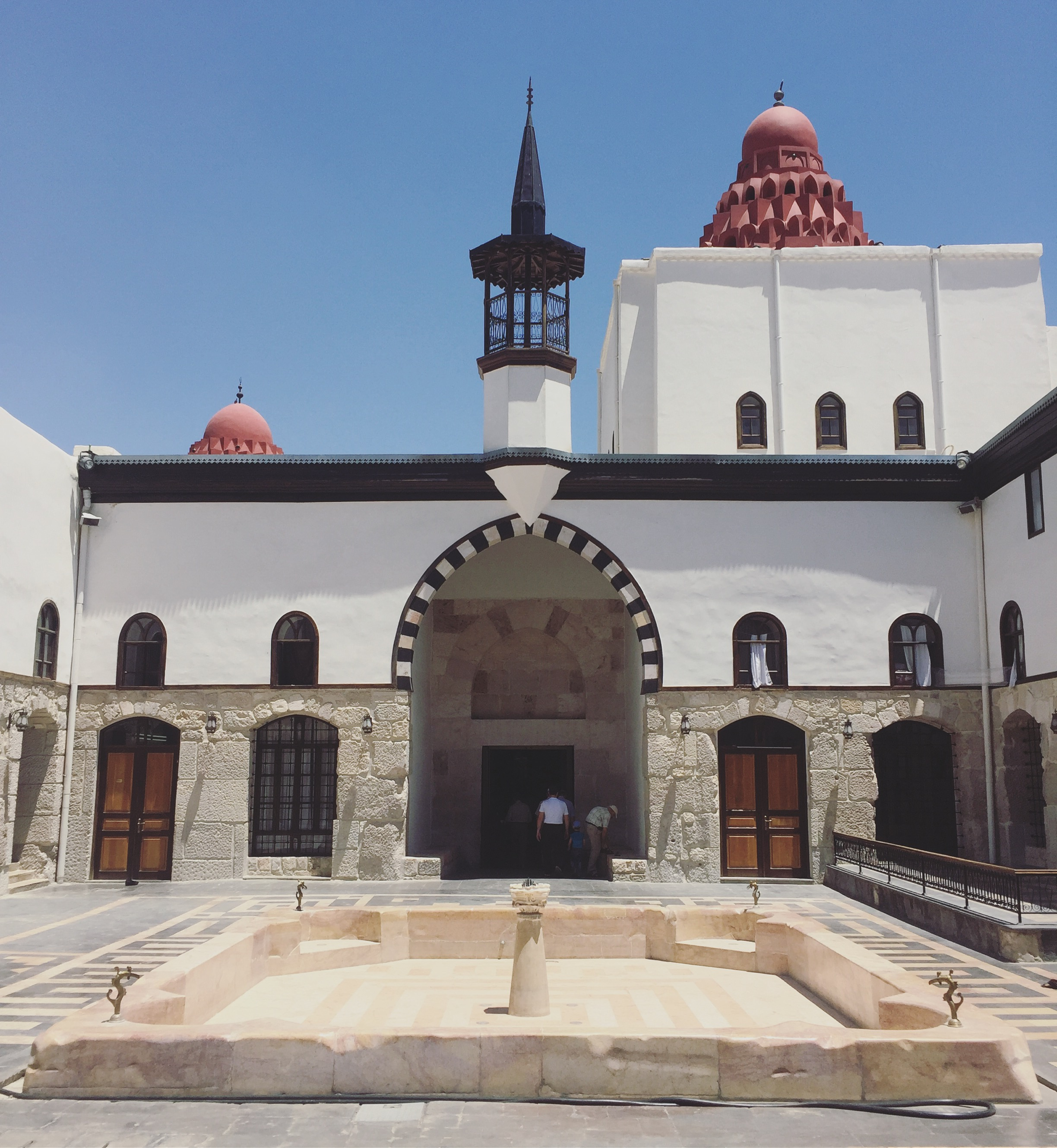
Nur al-Din Madrasa established in 1167

- Al-Joqmoqiyya Madrasa
- al-Nuriyya al-Kubra Madrasa, built in 1167 by Nūr ad-Dīn Zangī.
- The Great Al-Adiliyah Madrasa, a 13th-century madrasah named after Ayyubid Al-Adil I
- Al-Zahiriyah Library, established in 1277, taking its name from its founder Mamluk Sultan Baibars.
- Al-Fathiyah Madrasa, built in 1743 by an Ottoman official named Fethi Al-Defterdar.
- Al-Qaymariyya Madrasa
- Al-Joqmoqiyya Madrasa
- Al-Zahiriyah Madrasa, established in 1277, taking its name from its founder Sultan Baibars.
- Al-Qilijiyah Madrasa, established in 1254.

=== Places of worship ===
==== Mosques ====
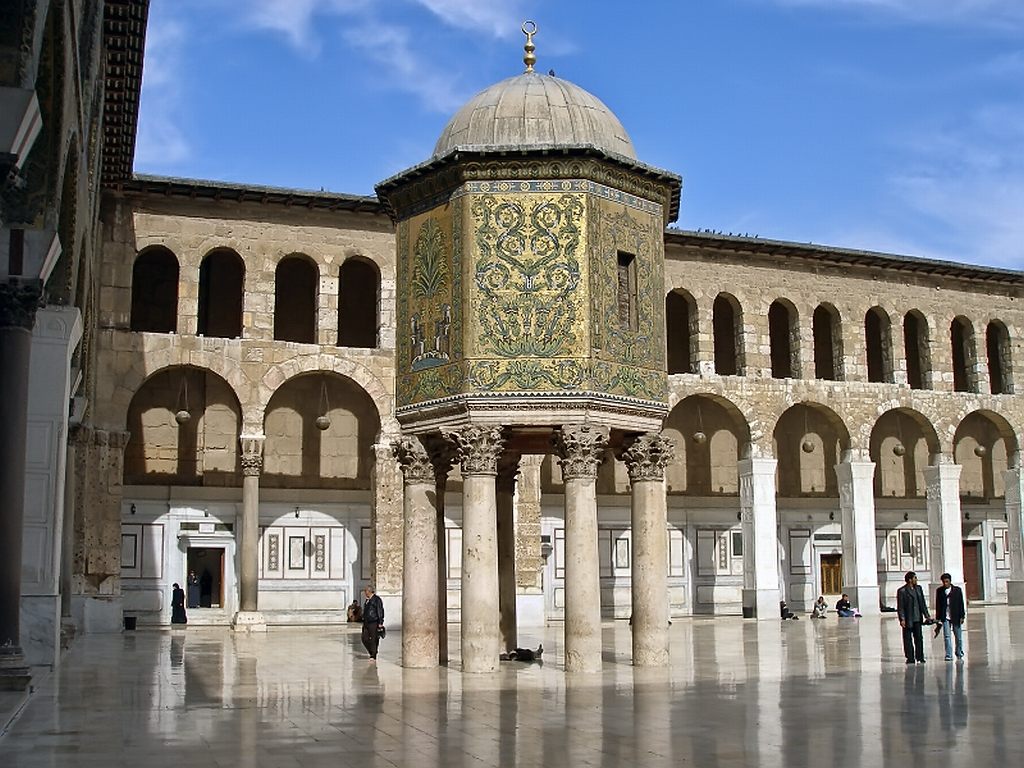
Umayyad Mosque courtyard

- Umayyad Mosque or the Great Mosque of Damascus, a mosque built between 705 and 715 on the site of Aramean Temple of Hadad, which was converted into the Temple of Jupiter, then into a Christian basilica which was dedicated to John the Baptist (Yahya).
- Sayyidah Ruqayya Mosque contains the grave of Sukayna bint Husayn, also known as Ruqayyah, the young daughter of Al-Husayn ibn ‘Alī.
- Sinan Pasha Mosque an Ottoman-era mosque built in 1590, it was built upon another mosque called "Al-Basal mosque".
- Al-Yaghushiyya Mosque
- Al-Safarjalani Mosque
- Al-Qali Mosque
- Al-Sadat Hamada Mosque
- Sidi Hisham ibn Ammar Mosque
- Qutb Al-Din Al-Khuidairi Mosque
- Taftafiyya Mosque
- Al-Khandaq Mosque
- Al-Habbubi Mosque
- Al-Bashura Mosque
- Jafar Al-Saqid Mosque

==== Churches ====
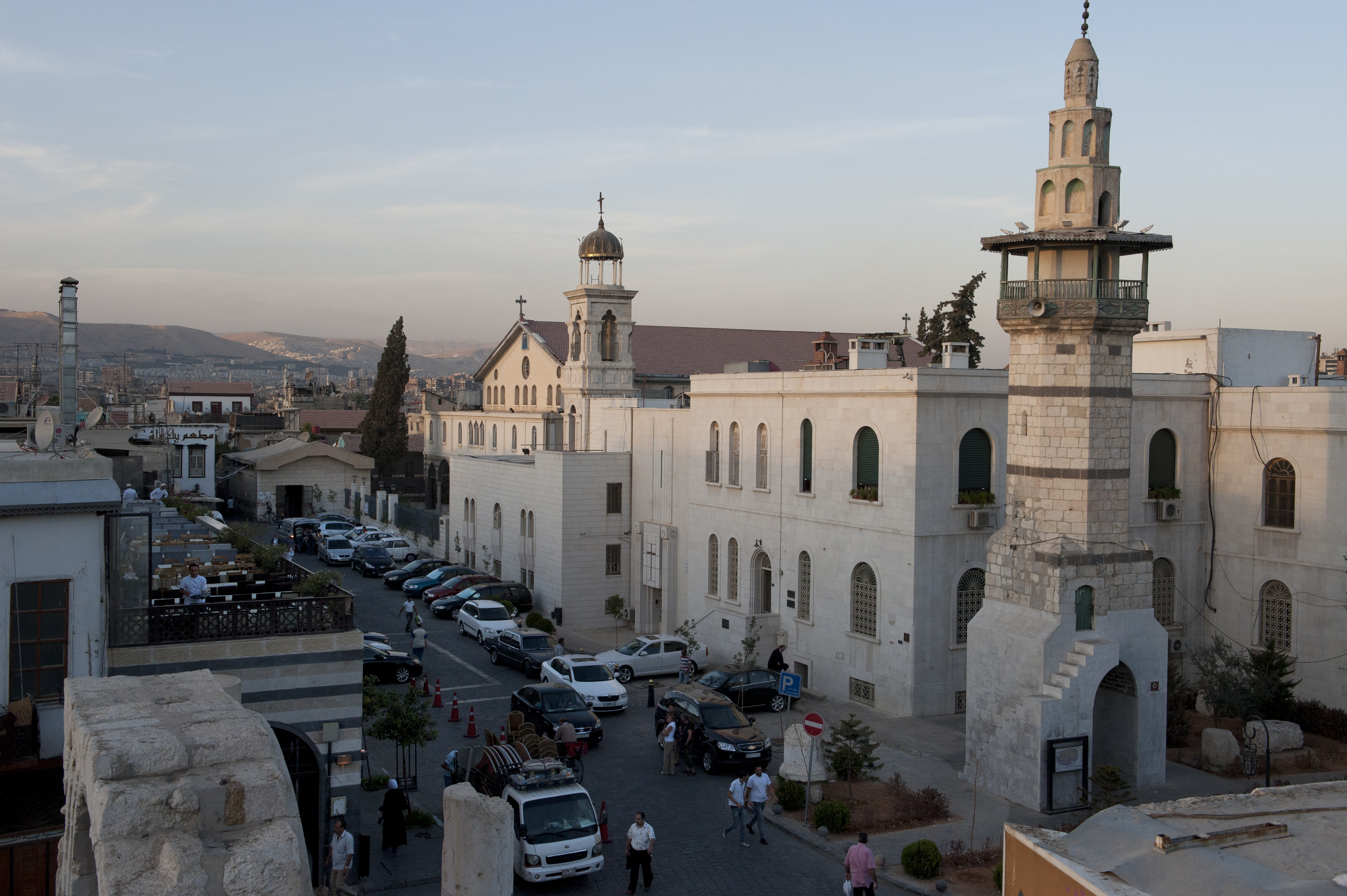
Mariamite Cathedral of Damascus.

- House of Saint Ananias, an ancient underground structure in Damascus, Syria, that is alleged to be the remains of the home of Ananias of Damascus, where Ananias baptized Saul (who became Paul the Apostle).
- Cathedral of the Dormition of Our Lady, also called "Greek-Melkite Patriarchal Cathedral of the Dormition of Our Lady", the Catholic cathedral of Melkite Greek Church.
- Mariamite Cathedral of Damascus, the seat of the Greek Orthodox Church of Antioch. After the Muslim conquest of Damascus the church was closed until 706 AD when al-Walid ordered to return it to the Christians as a compensation for the Church of John the Baptist which was turned into the Umayyad Mosque.
- al-Zeitoun Church Greek Catholic Patriarchate and Seminary
- Chapel of Saint Paul
- Cathedral of Saint George
- Syriac Catholic Cathedral of Saint Paul

==== Synagogues ====
- Al-Faranj Synagogue
- Al-Raki Synagogue
- Menarsha Synagogue

=== Gates ===
The old part of the city is surrounded with thick, 4.5-kilometre-long (2.8-mile) walls, pierced by the seven historical gates, the eighth gate was added later by Muslims. These are, clockwise from the north-east side:

- Bab Tuma (Gate of Thomas), dedicated to Venus.
- Bab Sharqi (The Eastern Gate), dedicated to the Sun.
- Bab Kisan (Kisan Gate), dedicated to Saturn.
- Bab al-Saghir (also called "Goristan-e-Ghariban"), dedicated to Jupiter.
- Bab al-Jabiyah (Gate of the Water Trough), dedicated to Mars.
- Bab al-Faradis (The Gate of the Paradise), dedicated to Mercury.
- Bab al-Salam (The Gate of Peace), dedicated to the Moon.
- Bab al-Faraj (The Gate of Deliverance), a gate which was built after the Muslim conquest of the Levant.

=== Hammams ===
The presence of public baths (ḥammāms) in Damascus started during the Umayyad era, while some historians date them back to the Roman era. The Damascene baths were mentioned by a number of Damascus historians, such as Ibn 'Asakir (1106–1175 AD) in his famous book "The History of Damascus". There, Ibn 'Asakir named 77 hammams working at that time in the city. The historian Ibn Shaddad counted 114 baths in Damascus in 1250 AD.

The number of these baths increased to 365 during the Ottoman era, then fell to reach 60 baths in the late 19th century. Since then, the number of baths in full operation has decreased to barely 20, the most well-preserved being the "Nur al-Din al-Shahid" bath in use since around 1160 in the Al-Buzuriyah Souq.

- Hammam Al-Malek Al-Zaher
- Hammam Nour Ed-din the Martyr
- Hammam Al-Bakri

== Districts and subdivisions ==
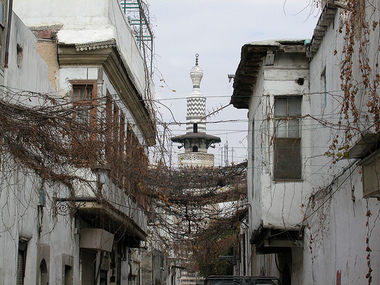
Al-Amarah District

- Al-Qaymariyya
- Al-Amarah Al-Jouwaniyah
- Al-Amin
  - Jewish quarter
- Bab Tuma
  - Al-Jourah
- Al-Hariqa
- Ma'azanat ash-Shahm
- Shaghour al-Juwani

== Preservation of the ancient city ==
=== Threats to the future of the old City ===
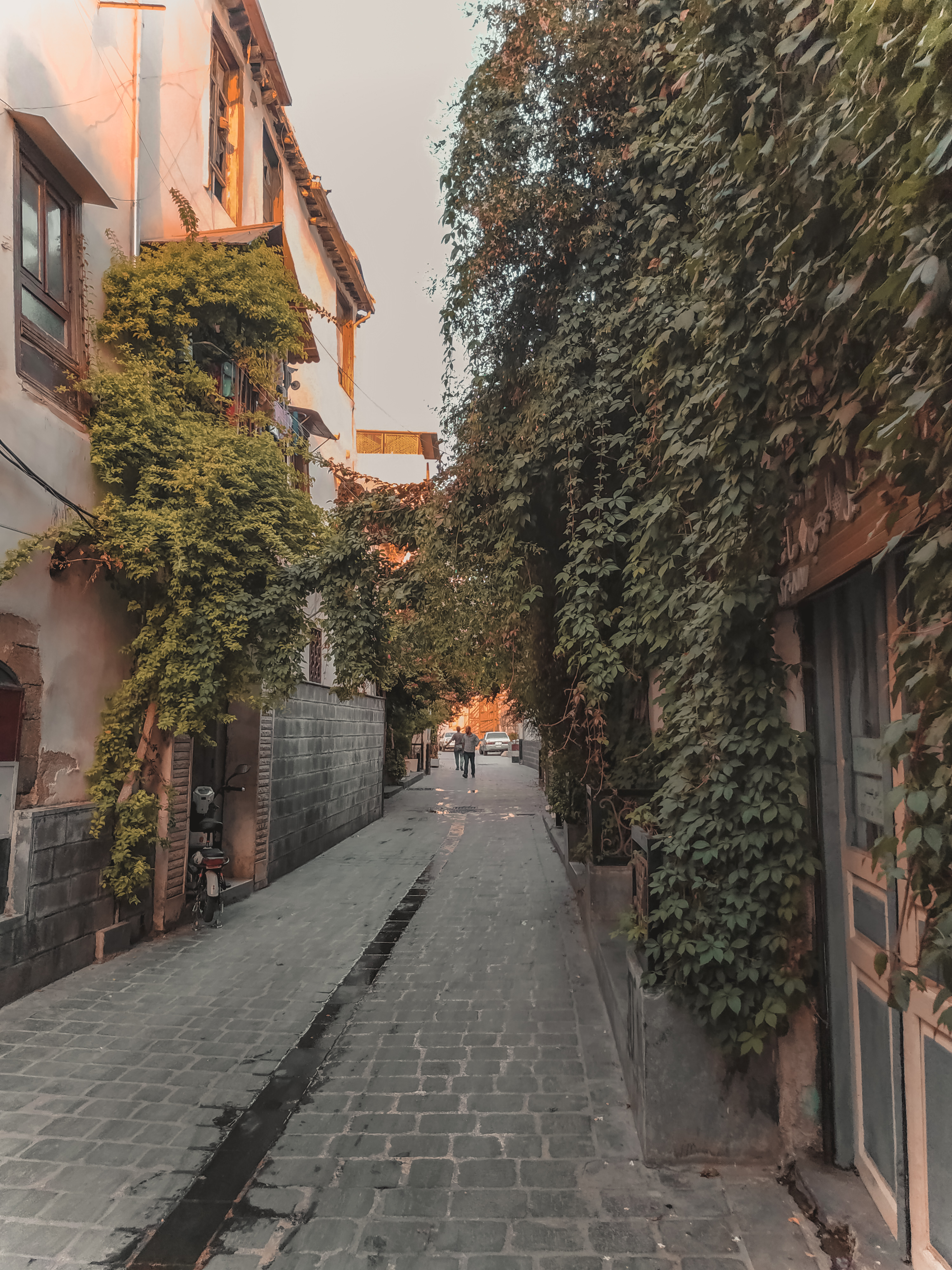
An alley in old Damascus

Due to the rapid decline of the population of Old Damascus (between 1995 and 2009 about 30,000 people moved out of the old city for more modern accommodation), a growing number of buildings are being abandoned or are falling into disrepair. In March 2007, the local government announced that it would be demolishing Old City buildings along a 1,400 m (4,600 ft) stretch of rampart walls as part of a redevelopment scheme. These factors resulted in the Old City being placed by the World Monuments Fund on its 2008 Watch List of the 100 Most Endangered Sites in the world.

=== Current state of old Damascus ===
In spite of the recommendations of the UNESCO World Heritage Center:

- Souq al-Atiq, a protected buffer zone, was destroyed in three days in November 2006;
- King Faysal Street, a traditional hand-craft region in a protected buffer zone near the walls of Old Damascus between the Citadel and Bab Touma, is threatened by a proposed motorway.
- In 2007, the Old City of Damascus and notably the district of Bab Tuma have been recognized by The World Monument Fund as one of the most endangered sites in the world.

In October 2010, Global Heritage Fund named Damascus one of 12 cultural heritage sites most "on the verge" of irreparable loss and destruction.

The old city outside of the walls of the Roman era, is also considered part of the old Damascus, however, it hasn't been given the same historical priority. During the French mandate, Michel Écochard, the French architect, planned an urban scheme for the city, that advised to only reserve the parts of the old city inside the Roman walls. This approach has been adopted later by the ruling governments of Syria, which contributed to demolishing parts of its old neighborhoods. Old houses in Sarouja, Al Midan, and Shagour Barrani was replaced by new buildings for trade mainly.

== See also ==
- Tourism in Syria
- Timeline of Damascus history
- List of rulers of Damascus
- World Heritage Sites in Danger
