= Bab al-Faraj =

Bab al-Faraj may refer to places in Syria:

- Bab al-Faraj (Aleppo), one of the gates of the old city of Aleppo
- Bab al-Faraj (Damascus), one of the gates of the old city of Damascus
