= Saeed Al Samman =

- Born: Saeed bin Muhammad bin Ahmed Al-Samman Al-Shafi'i, Al Dimashqi. Year 1706 Damascus
- Died: Year 1759 (52-53 years old) Damascus
- Occupations: Writer, poet

Saeed bin Mohammed bin Ahmed Al-Samman Al-Shafi'i Al Demashqi, also known as Ashraf Saeed Al-Samman, Mohammed bin Ahmed Al-Samman, and Mohammed Saeed (born 1706-1118 AH) was a docile writer and a late Demashqi poet. He was born and died in Damascus, Syria.

== Education ==
He recited the Qur'an to Sheikh Theeb bin Al-Mualla and memorized it. He sought knowledge from the sheikhs, and he recited it to Sheikh Ahmed Al-Menini in the grammar and others, and to Sheikh Ismail Al-Ajlouni, Sheikh Muhammad bin Ibrahim Al-Tadmari Al-Tarabulsi and Sheikh Muhammad bin Abdul Rahman Al-Ghazi. Ibn Ahmad Ibn Qolaqsuz Ibn Aqil in grammar, al-Jami and al-Issam. He also read on Sheikh Ali Kuzbar and Sheikh Ali al-Daghestani, and he graduated in literature at the hands of Sheikh Saadi bin Abd al-Qadir al-Omari al-Dimashqi.

== Literary Life ==
Samman excelled in literature and was famous for it. In his work, he traveled to Rome, Aleppo, Egypt, Tripoli, the Levant, and Baalbek, and he wrote a thousand poems in praise of notables, presidents and ministers in Damascus and elsewhere. In Damascus, he belonged to President Fathallah bin Muhammad Al-Daftari Al-Ghaqalansi, who made him an imam and preacher at a school he established in 1156 AH in the locality of Al-Qaymariya, as mentioned by the president in a book he wrote and called "Al-Rawd Al-Nafeh" in which he praised the writers of Damascus.

He wanted to write a book in which he would translate the poets of his time and collect their relics, and he traveled between the countries for that purpose until he died before completing it, and in the Berlin Library a piece containing the translations of 69 poets of his contemporaries believed to be from the drafts of this book. He authored literary letters and a poetry collection called "Mana'ih al-Afkar fi Madayih Al akhiar," and his book "Al-Rawd al-Nafeh" about the praises of the Fallancan conquest is found in Berlin.

== Works ==
- Min al'afkar fi madayih al'akhyar
- Nozum almughaniy fi alnahw
- Hashiat alaa alkamil lilmabrad
- Rasayil 'adabia
- Dhayl nafhat alrayhana
- Alrawd alnaafih fima warad alaa alfath min almadayih
