= Beit al-Mamlouka Hotel =

Luxury boutique hotel in Damascus, Syria

- بَيْت ٱلْمَمْلُوكَة
- Location within Damascus

General information
- Location: Bab Tuma, Damascus, Syria
- Coordinates: 33°30′45.25″N 36°18′49″E
- Opening: 2005

Other information
- Number of rooms: 8

Beit al-Mamlouka (Arabic: بَيْت ٱلْمَمْلُوكَة, romanized: Bayt al-Mamlūkah) is a luxury boutique hotel located in the old city of Damascus, Syria. It was established in 2005 in the city's oldest borough, the Christian quarter of Bab Tuma ("St. Thomas' Gate").

The hotel is a restoration of a 17th-century Damascene house and offers 8 different rooms each named after a famous historic figure of Arab or Muslim history, like Averroes and Baybars. There are original paintings and features from the 18th century, together with a mid 16th century archway and a 200-year Christian fresco.
