= Maktab Anbar =

Historic building in Damascus, Syria

Coordinates: 33°30′35.5″N 36°18′34″E

- مكتب عنبر
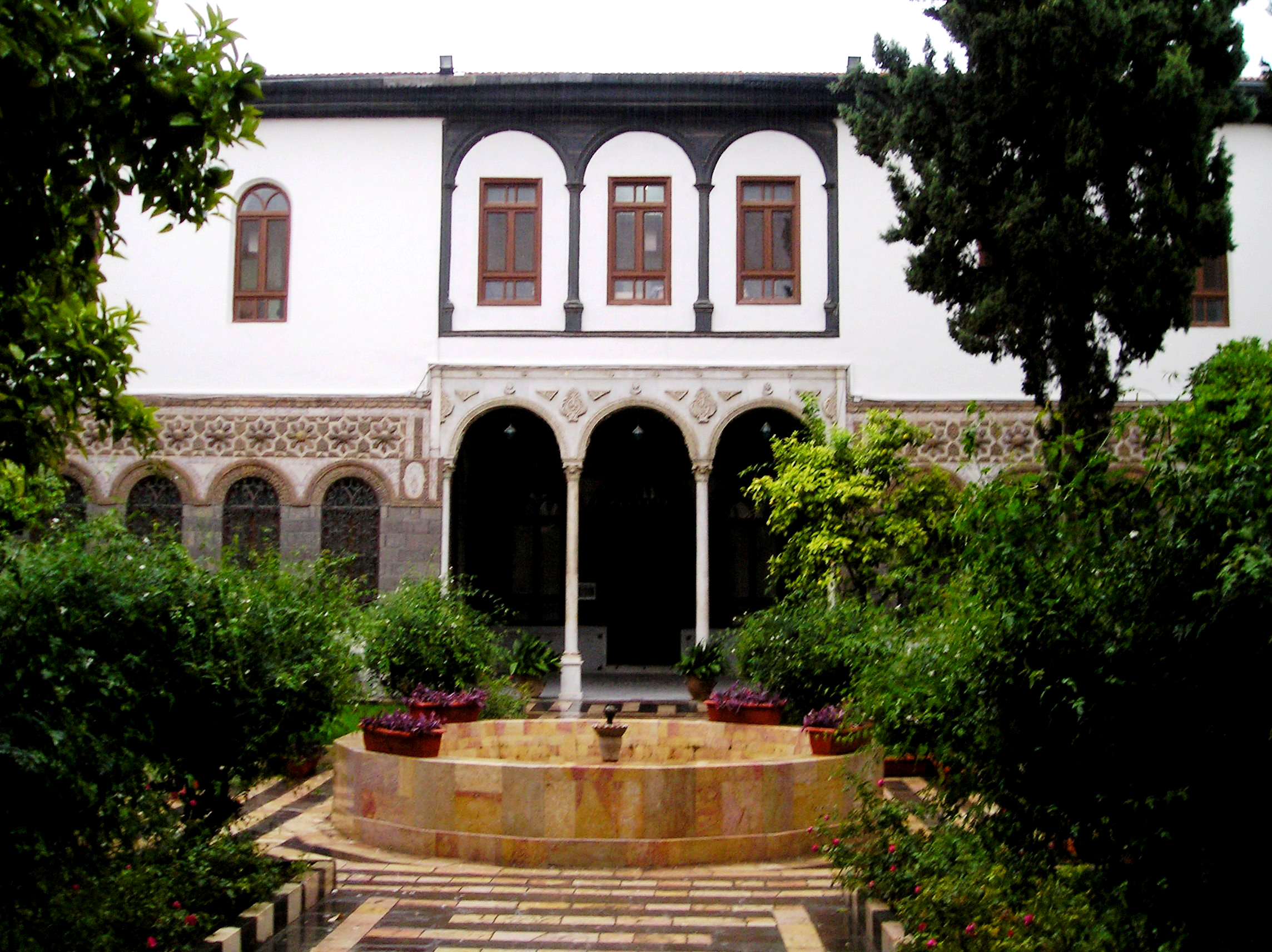
- The female courtyard
- Interactive map of the Maktab Anbar area

General information
- Type: Courtyard mansion
- Architectural style: Damascene (Levantine)
- Completed: 1860s/1870s
- Client: The Anbar family

Maktab Anbar (Arabic: مكتب عنبر, lit. 'Anbar Office') is a house in the center of Old Damascus, Syria. The house was built as a private residence by a local Jewish notable Mr. Anbar in the mid 19th century and was later confiscated by the Ottoman government after Mr. Anbar's bankruptcy.

The house is built around three courtyards, first the formal reception courtyard, behind this the attractive female courtyard, and finally the spartan servants' courtyard. Due to the cost of building, the owner turned the building into the Damascus Civil Preparatory School, which was a prestigious, expensive, tuition-based school for the children of the land-owning families of Damascus. According to Philip Khoury, many Syrian nationalist leaders who worked and were co-opted by the French from 1928 and independence in 1946, were graduates of Maktab Anbar. The house was restored by the Ministry of Culture in 1976. It now holds a library exhibition hall, museum and craft workshops.

== Gallery ==
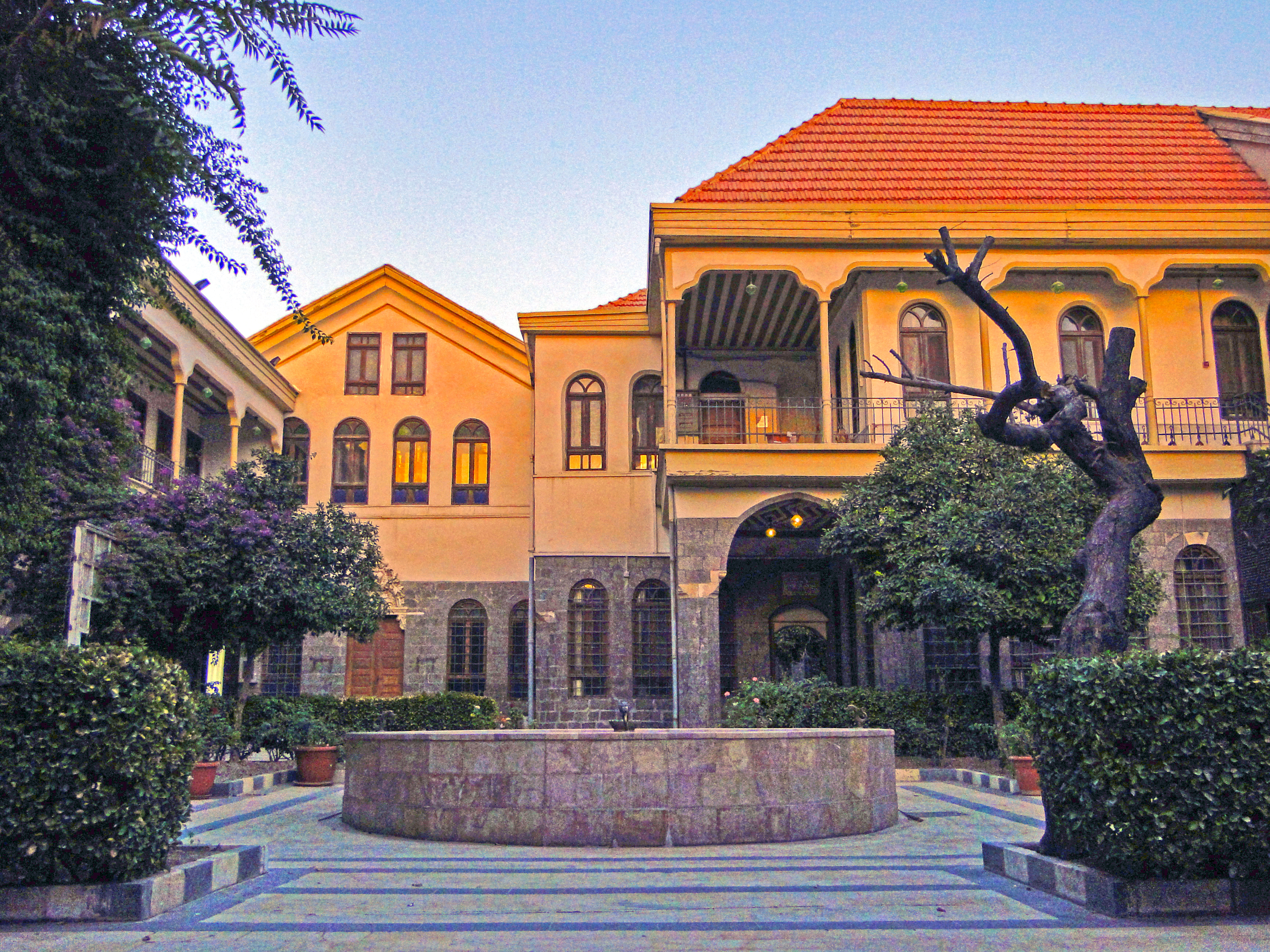
Maktab Anbar

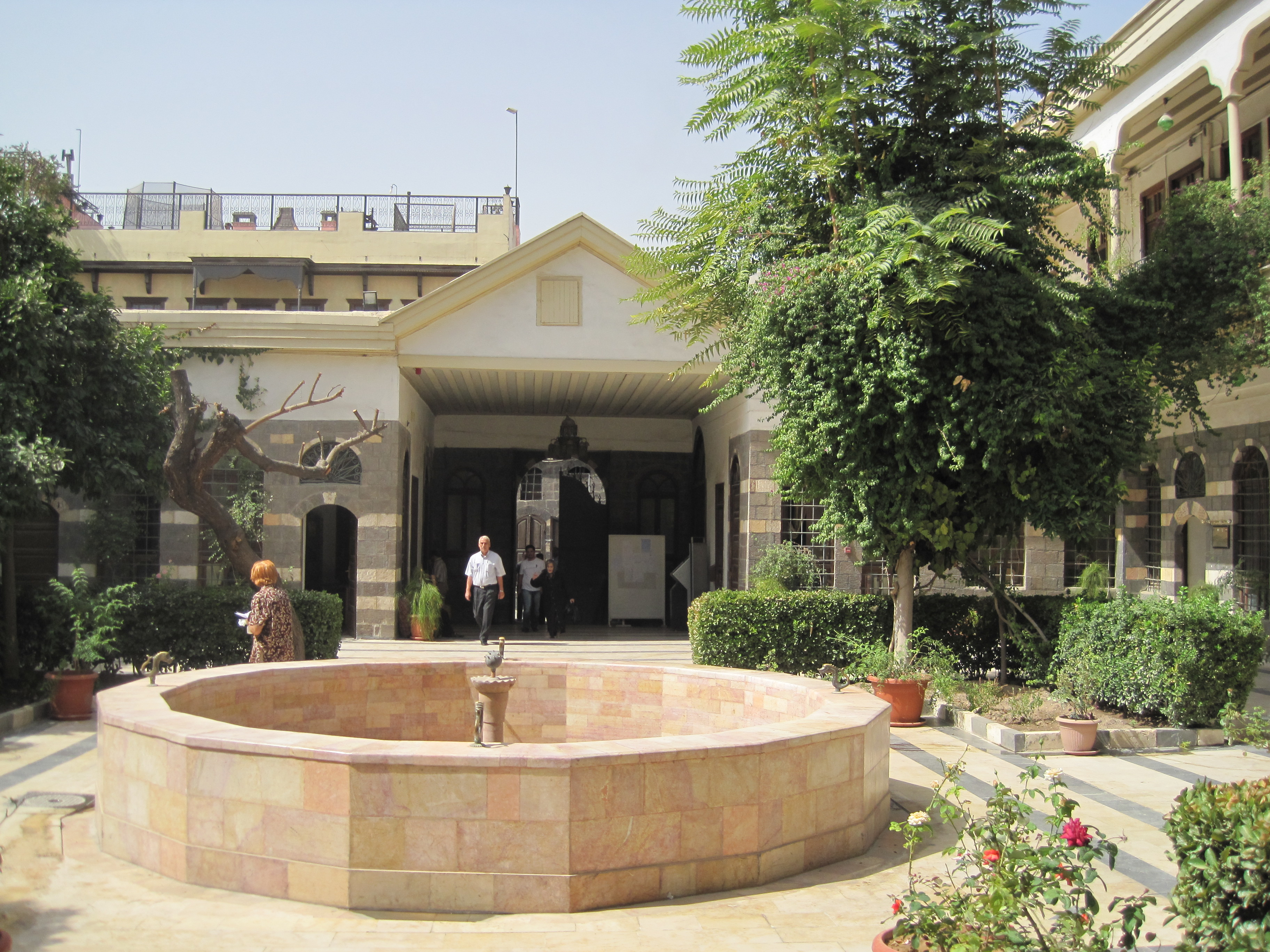
The reception courtyard

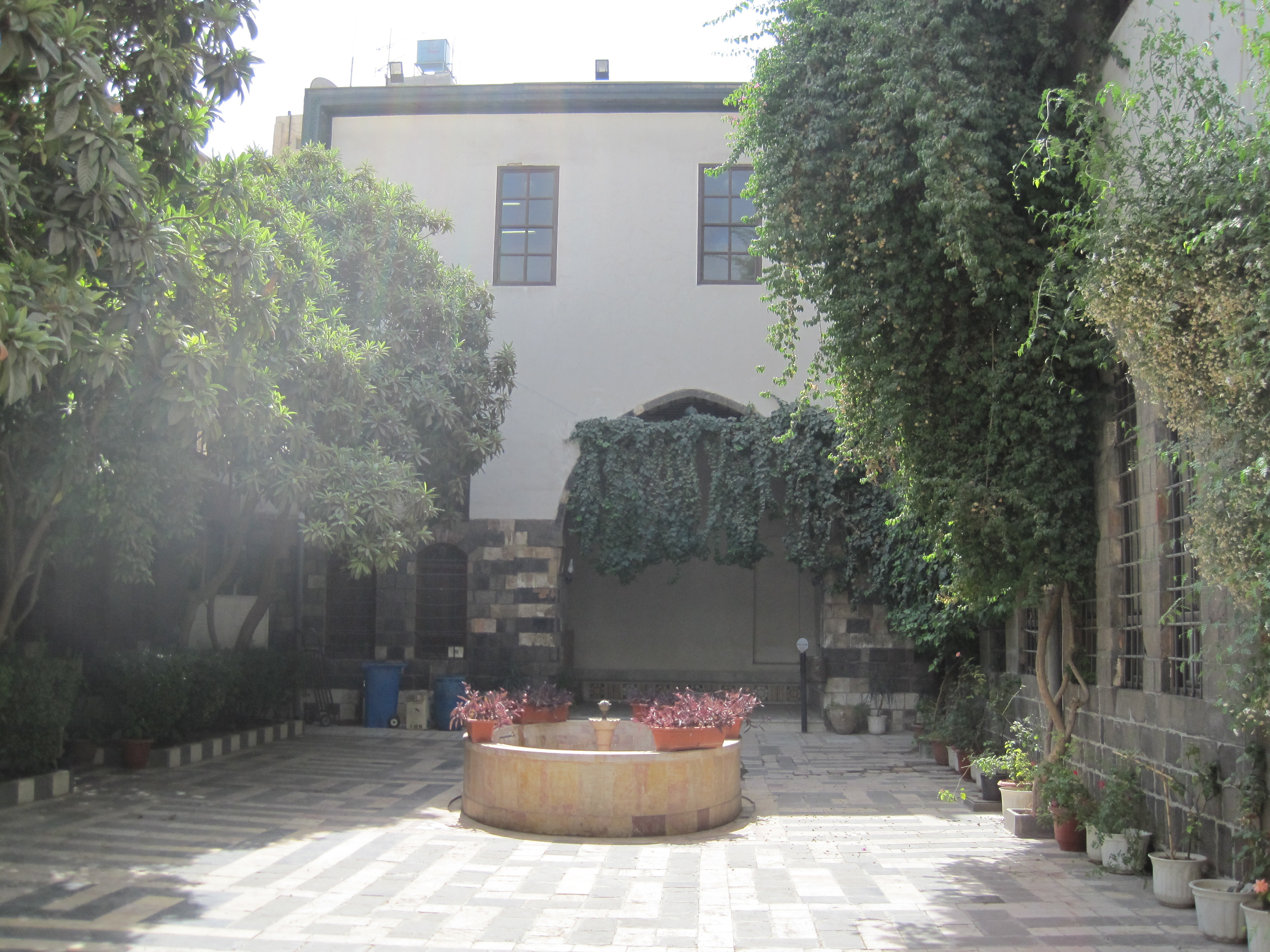
The servants' courtyard

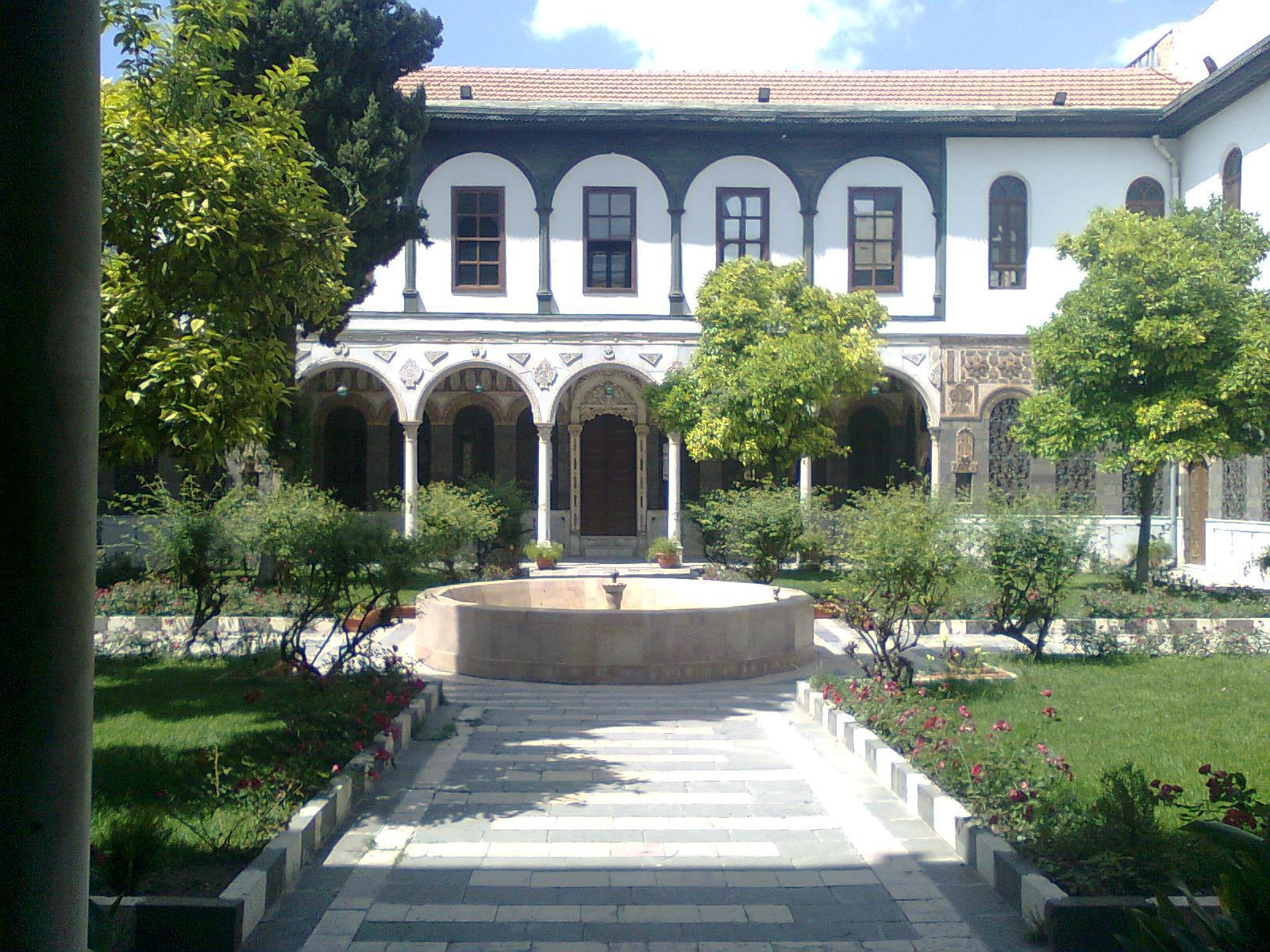
The female courtyard

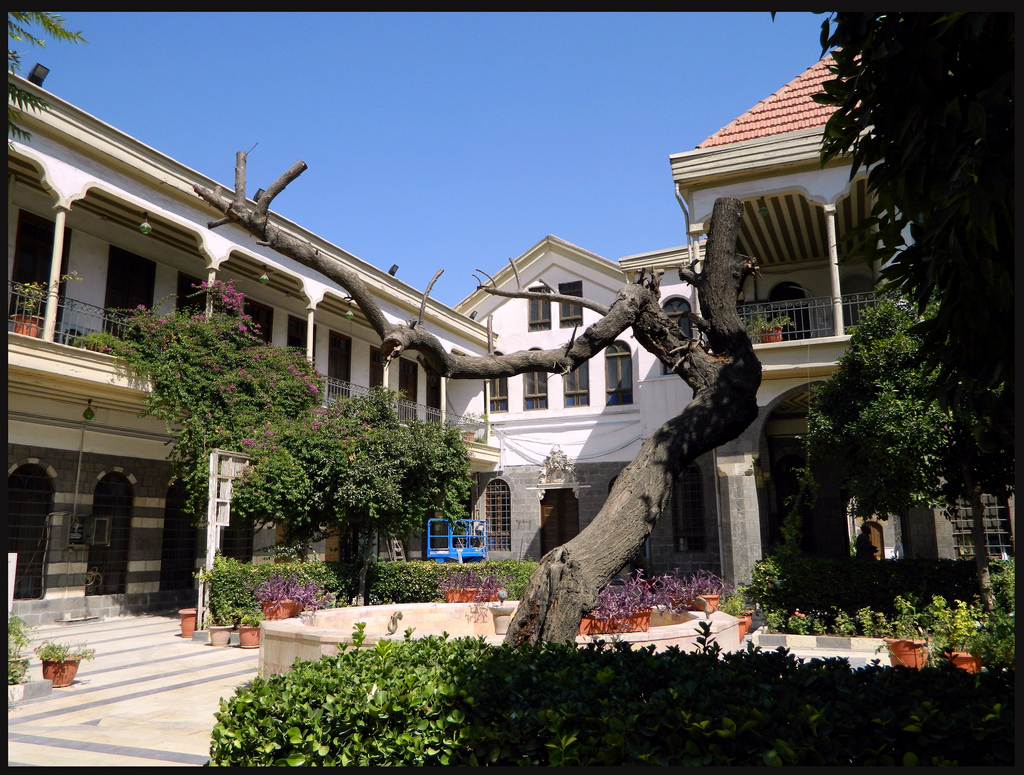
View of the gardens

== See also ==
- Bayt Farhi
- History of the Jews in Syria
