= Bab Tuma =

Area in, and ancient city gate of, Damascus

Bab Tuma باب توما
- Interactive map of Bab Tuma باب توما
- Location: Old Damascus, Syria
- Coordinates: 33°30′48″N 36°18′54″E

Bab Tuma (Arabic: بَابُ تُومَا, romanized: Bāb Tūmā, meaning: "Gate of Thomas") is a neighborhood located in the old city of Damascus in Syria. It is named after one of the seven gates of old city of Damascus, located within the neighbourhood.

== Etymology ==
The gate was named by the Byzantines to commemorate Thomas the Apostle, one of the Twelve Apostles of Jesus Christ.

== History ==
=== Late modern period ===
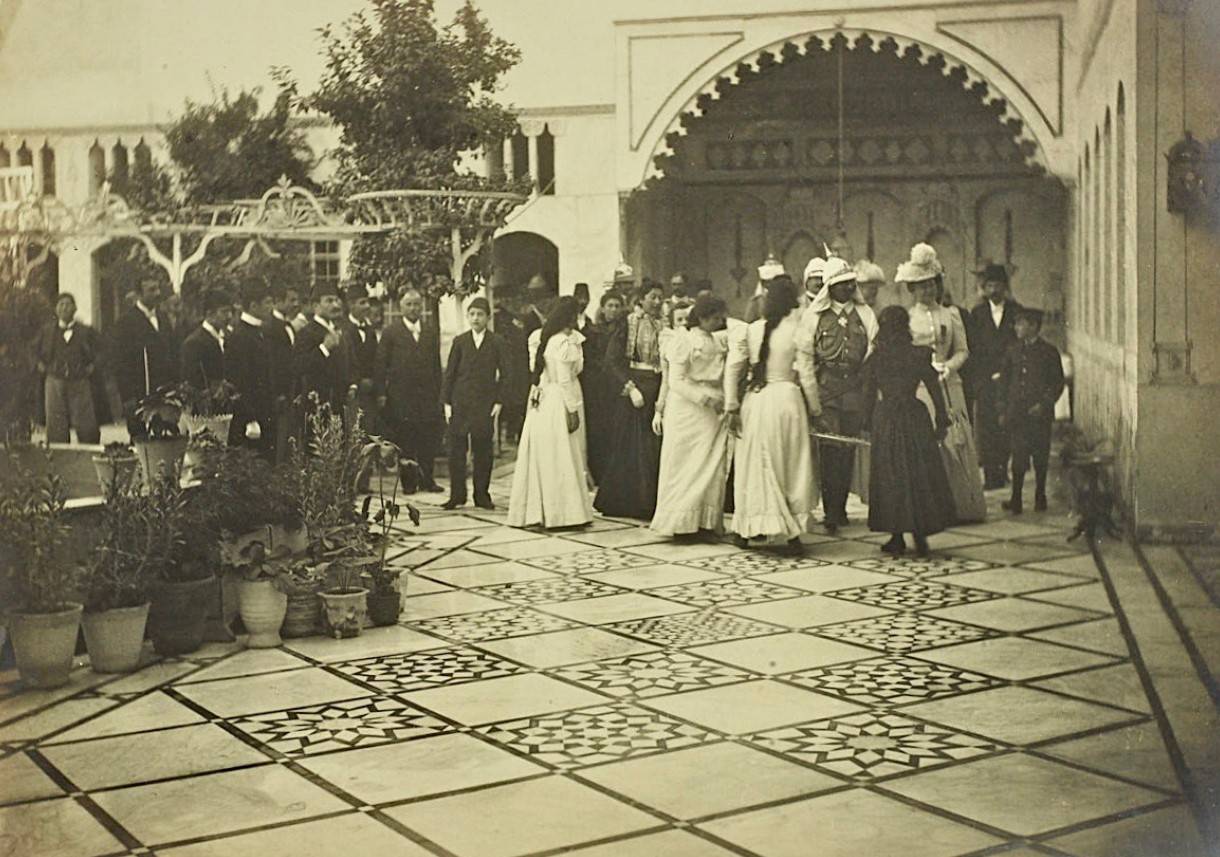
Wilhelm II and Augusta Victoria of Schleswig-Holstein visiting Bab tuma, 1898

The Damascus affair happened in 1840, near Bab Tuma, when an Italian monk & his servant disappeared. The Christians accused the Jews of their disappearance, saying they extracted their blood to bake matzo.

The neighborhood was the site of the 1860 massacre of Christians by a local interfaith mob, during the larger conflict between the Druze and Christians in Mount Lebanon.

French noble Alphonse de Lamartine visited Bab Tuma in 1832. It was also visited by German emperor Wilhelm II and his wife, Augusta Victoria of Schleswig-Holstein, in 1898.

== Tourism ==
It is a famous geographic landmark in Damascus. It has a hotel in the area called "Bab Touma Hotel".

== Geography ==
It is located in Old Damascus, near Bab Sharqi and the Umayyad Mosque. Beit Shameea is located there; it was converted to Besançon school. Patriarch Dimitrios I opened the St. Paul school in 1925.

== Notable people ==
- Paul the Apostle, one of the most important figures in Christianity after Jesus Christ.
- Thomas the Apostle, who traveled through Afghanistan and India. The first to bring Christianity to South Asia.
- Ananias of Damascus, a disciple of Jesus Christ.
- Raphael of Brooklyn, first Eastern Orthodox bishop in North America.
- Michel Aflaq, Syrian philosopher.
- Andrew Emile Anka Sr., father of Paul Anka.

== Religion and culture ==
In the 16th century, it was entirely Syriac Catholic and Greek Orthodox. Easter and Christmas are celebrated every year in the area. Kahk is prepared every year on Easter.

== Gallery ==
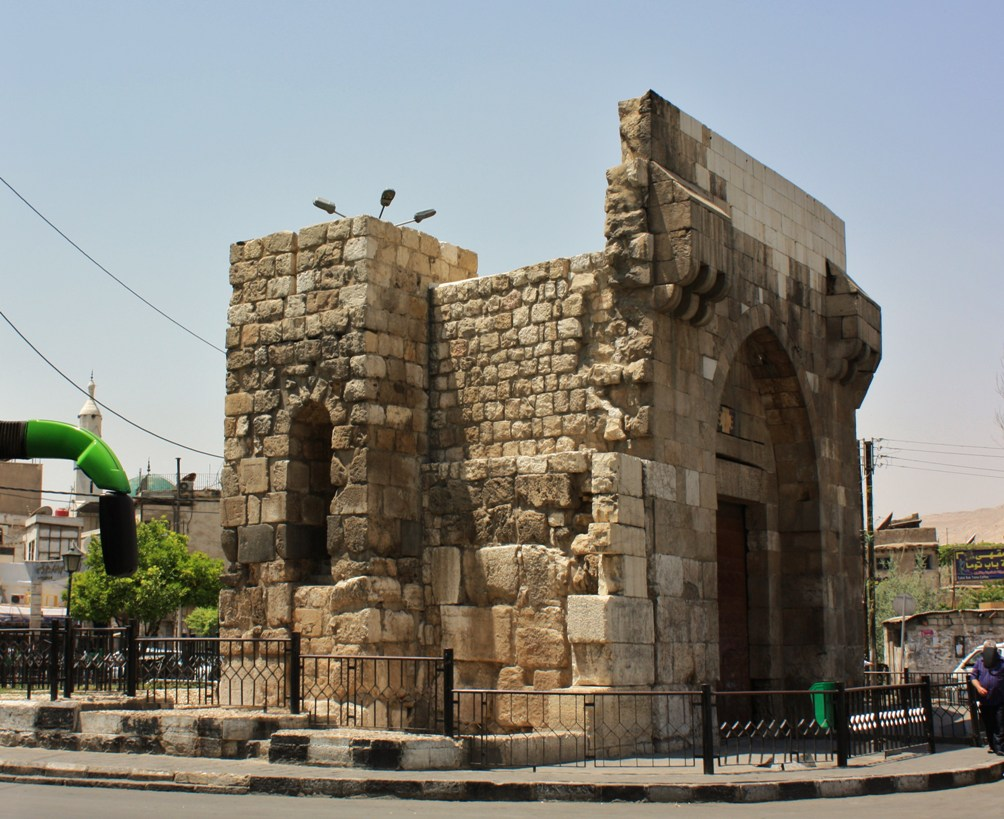
Side view of Thomas' gate.

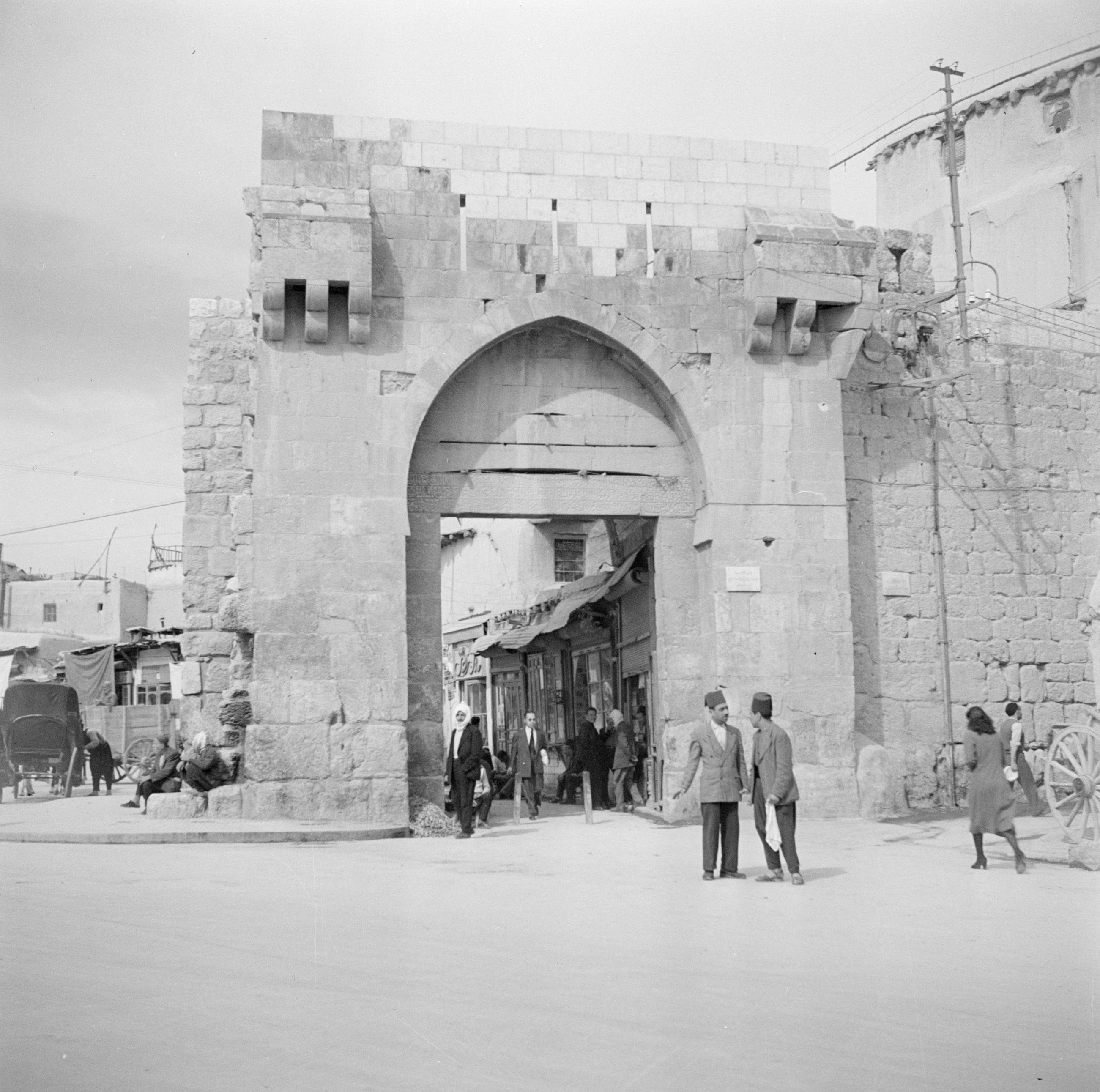
Thomas' gate in 1950, before the authorities tore down the shops, visible in the photo, to make way for a newly paved road.
