= Saint Ananias House =

Coordinates: 33°30′41″N 36°19′3″E

House of Saint Ananias
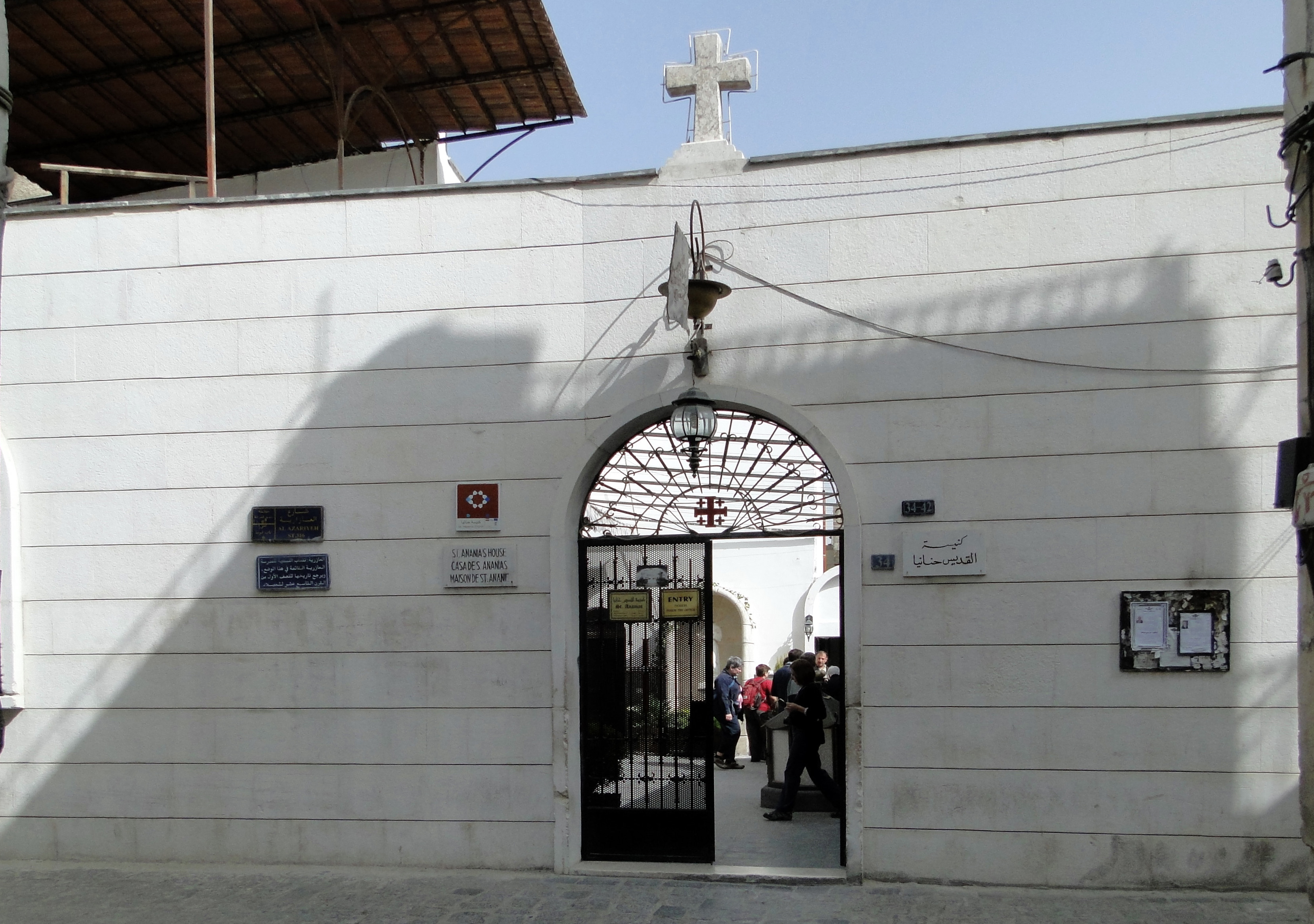
- Entrance of the Chapel of Saint Ananias
- House of Saint Ananias
- Location: Straight Street, Ancient City Damascus
- Country: Syria
- Denomination: Syriac Maronite Church

History
- Status: Active church
- Founded: Early Christianity
- Dedication: Ananias of Damascus

Administration
- Diocese: Maronite Catholic Archeparchy of Damascus

Clergy
- Archbishop: Samir Nassar

The House of Saint Ananias (also called Saint Ananias House or Chapel of Saint Ananias; Arabic: كَنيسَةُ الْقِدِّيسِ حَنَانِيَا, romanized: Kanīsat al-Qiddīs Ḥanāniyā) is an ancient underground structure in Damascus, Syria, that is said to be the remains of the home of Ananias of Damascus, where Ananias baptized Saul (who became Paul the Apostle). The building is at the end of the Street Called Straight near the Bab Sharqi (Eastern Gate).

== History ==
Archaeological excavations in 1921 found the remains of a Byzantine church from the 5th or 6th century AD, adding physical evidence to support local tradition that the chapel has an early-Christian origin.

== Gallery ==
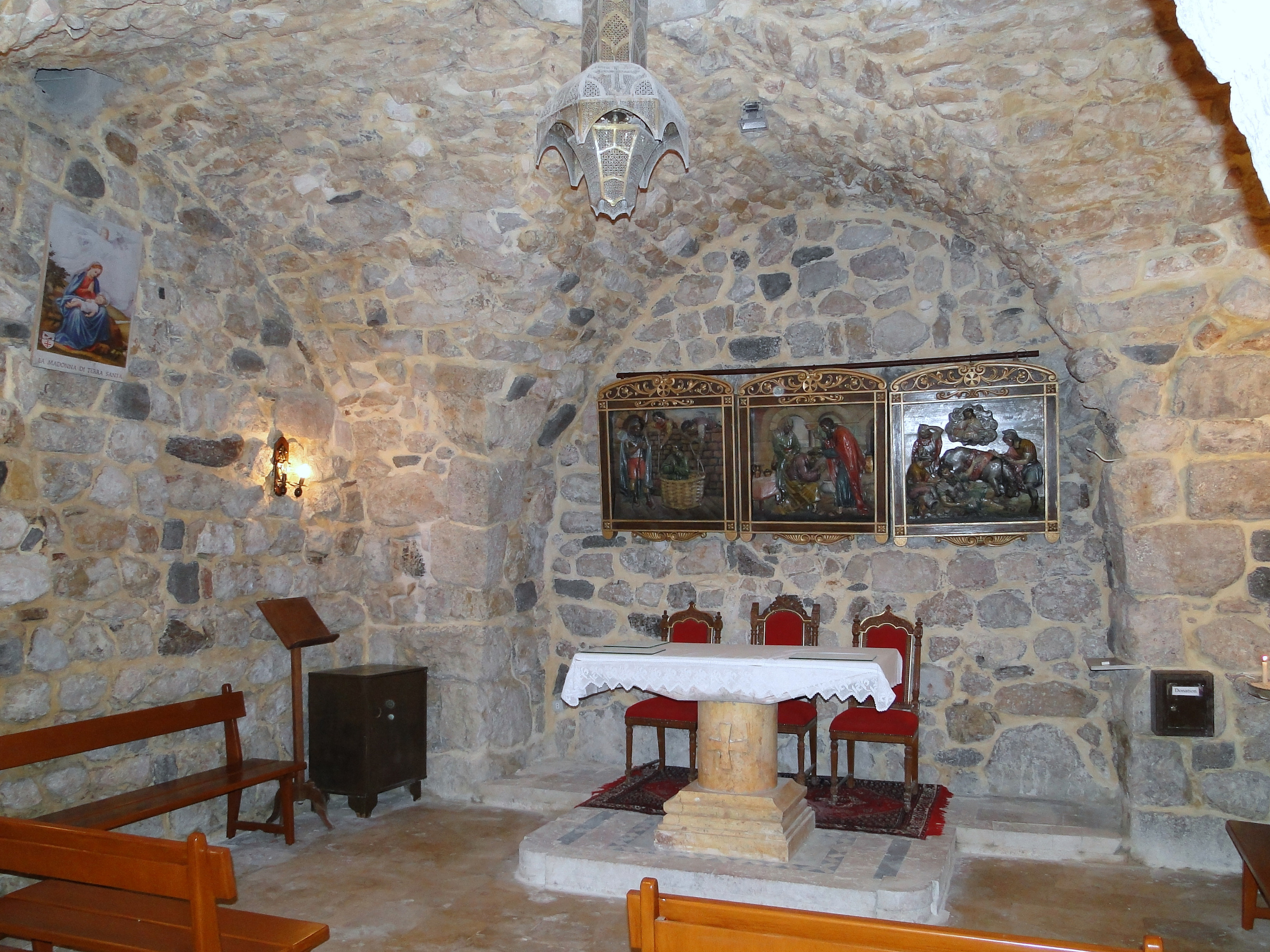
Inside the Chapel of Saint Ananias

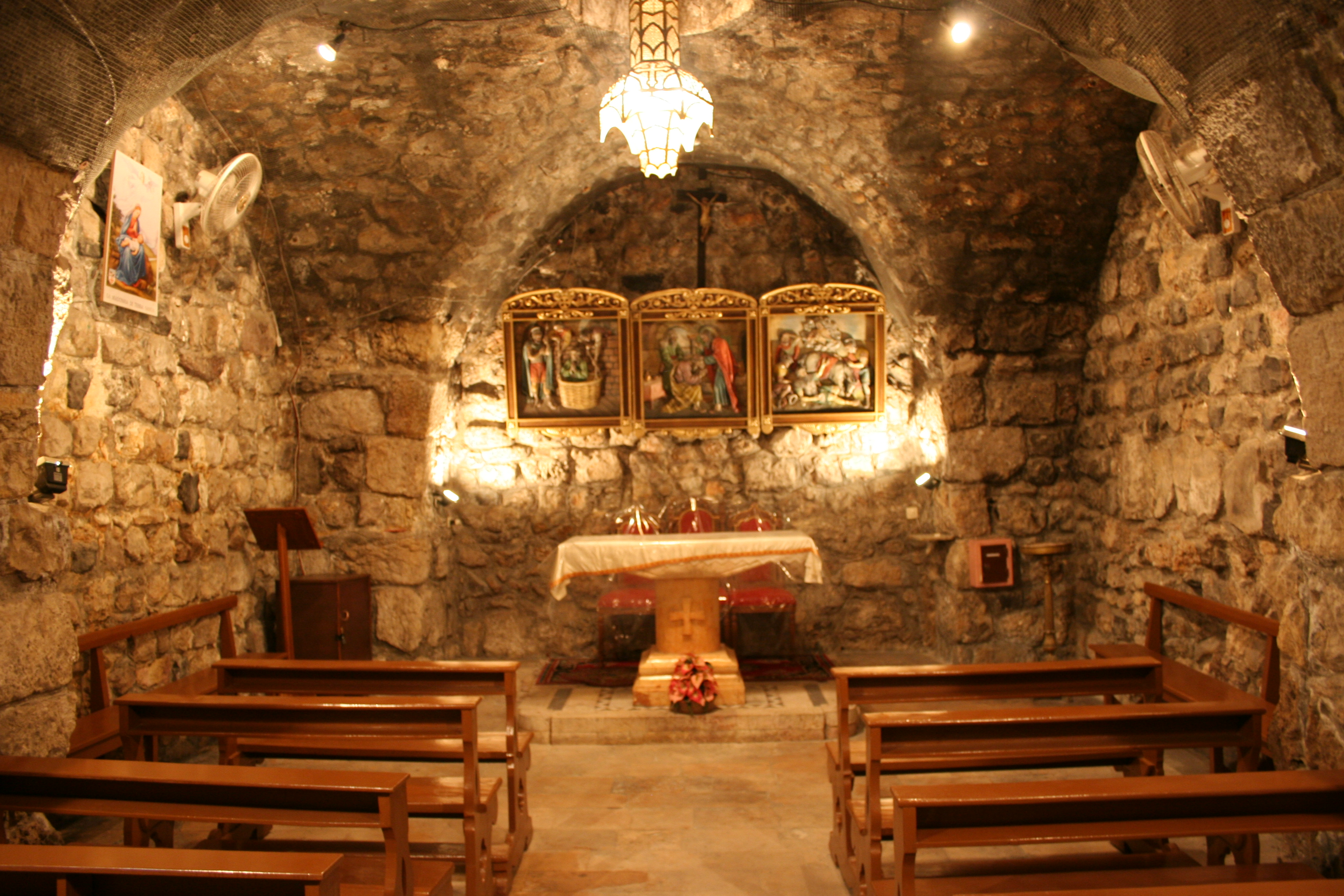
Inside of Saint Ananias Church

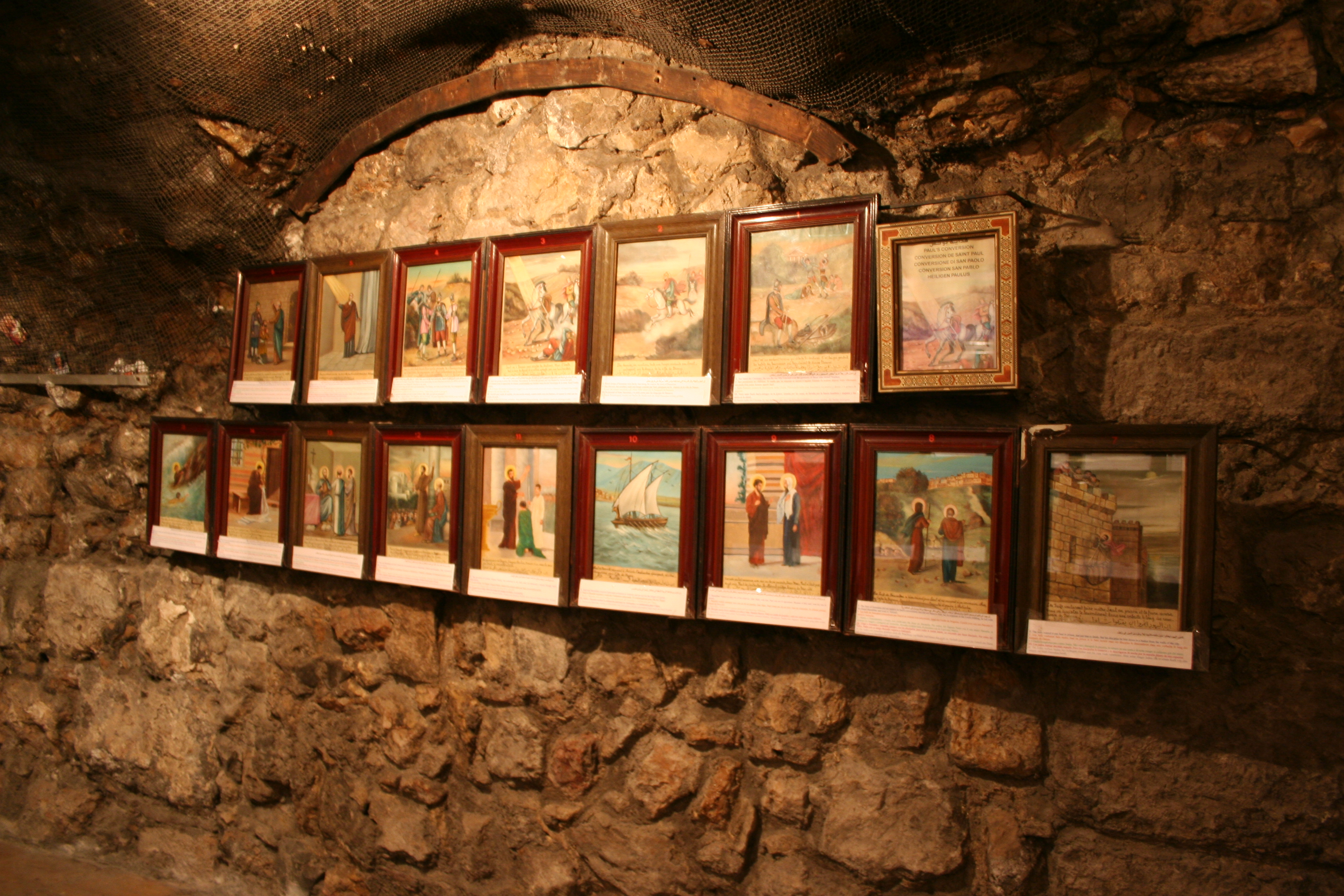
Story layout of Saint Ananias
