= Qaymariyya =

Coordinates: 33°30′42″N 36°18′40″E

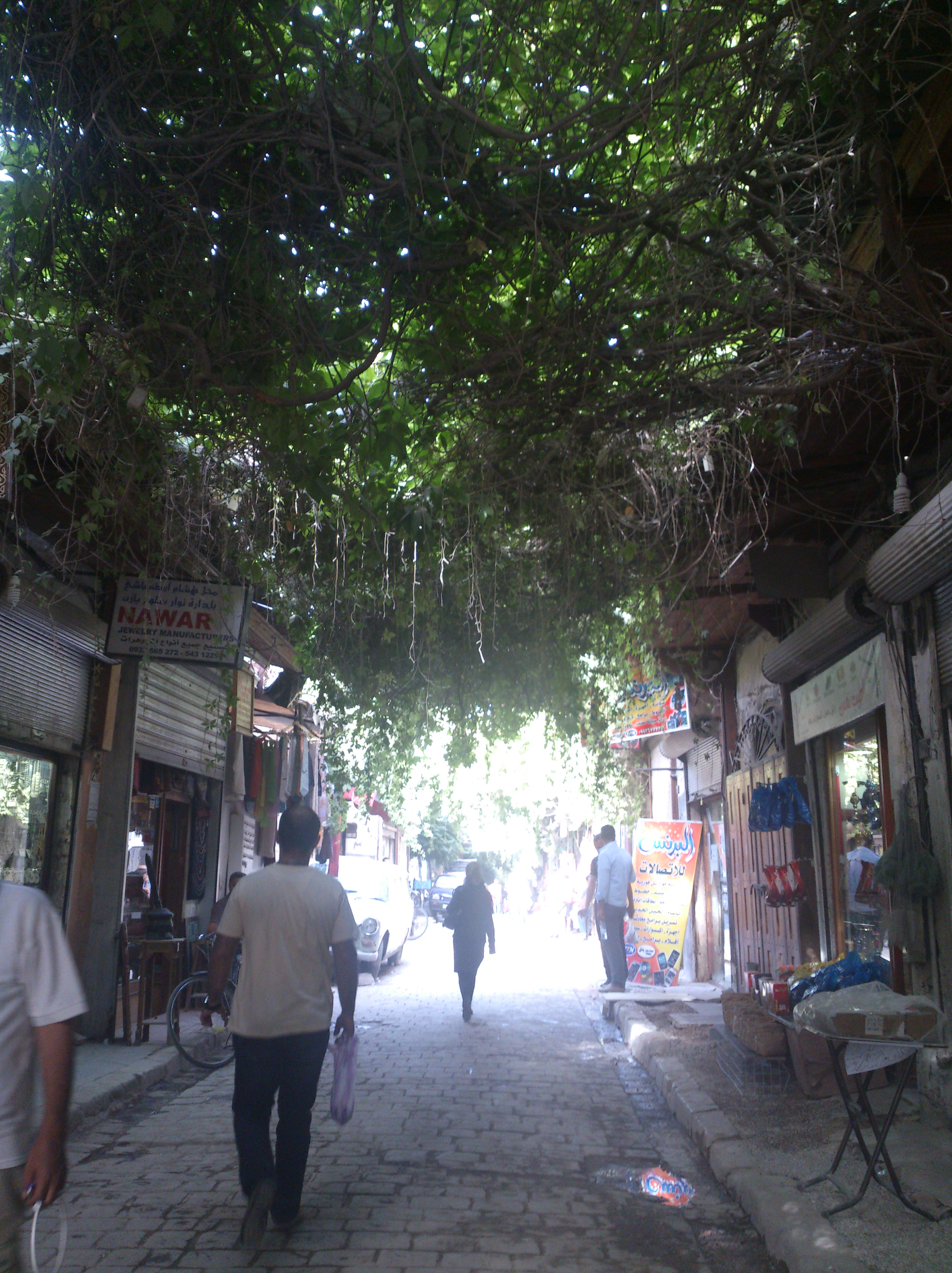

Al-Qaymariyya (Arabic: القيمرية) is a quarter of the Old City of Damascus. It is located in the center of the Old City, bordering the eastern wall of the Umayyad Mosque. It had a population of 4,034 in the 2004 census.

Al-Qaymariyya was named after the Ayyubid-Kurdish emir Naser ad-Din al-Hussein bin Abdul Aziz al-Qaymari al-Kurdi who built "Al-Qaymariyya Grand School" there. In the late 19th century and early 20th century, al-Qaymariyya was a middle-class, residential neighborhood, primarily home to Damascus businessmen. In the 1936 French Mandate census, Qaymariyya had a population of 5,817 Muslims and 241 Christians.
