= Ananias of Damascus =

One of the Seventy Disciples of Jesus

Saint Ananias of Damascus
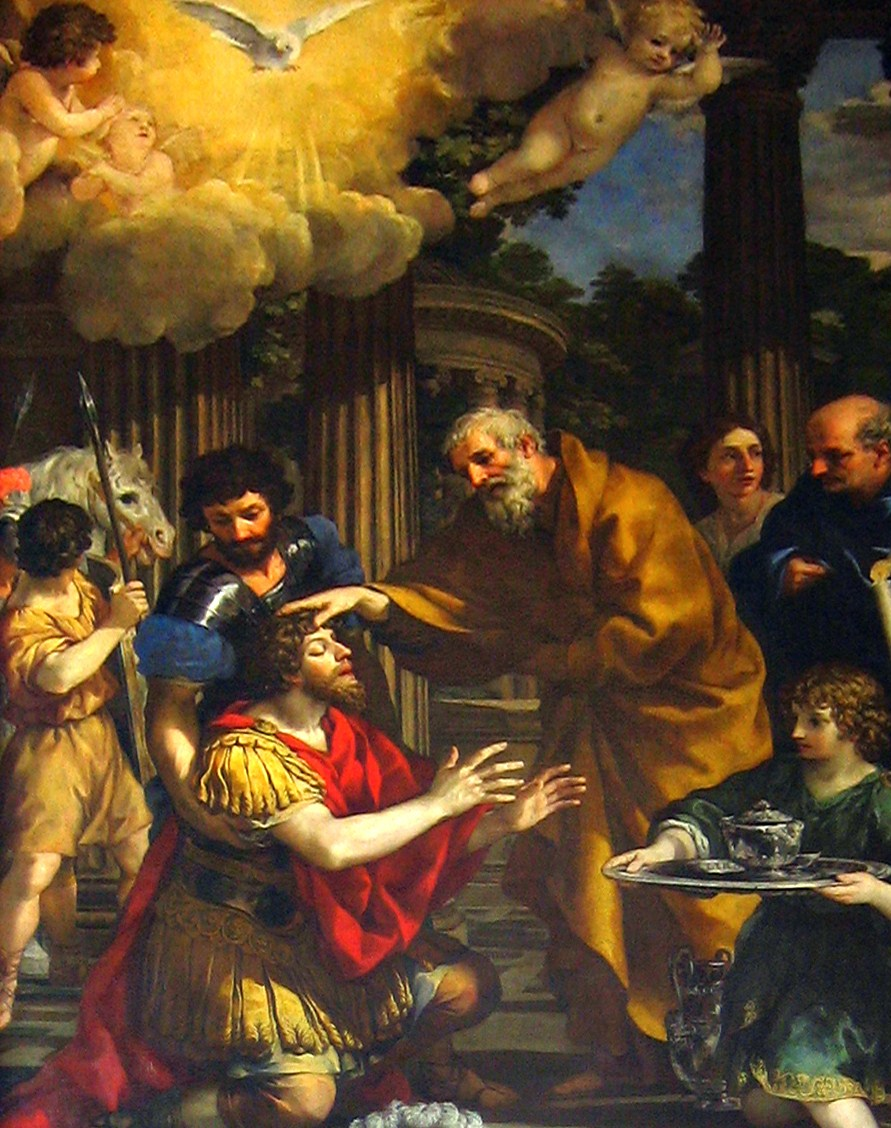
- Ananias restoring the sight of Saint Paul; Pietro da Cortona, 1631

Apostle, Prophet, and Martyr Disciple of the Seventy
- Born: c. 1st century AD; Unknown (perhaps Damascus, Syria, Roman Empire)
- Died: c. 60 AD; Eleutheropolis, Judaea, Roman Empire (tradition)
- Venerated in: Catholic Church; Eastern Orthodox Church; Oriental Orthodoxy; Anglicanism; Lutheranism
- Major shrine: Zoravor Surp Astvatsatsin Church in Yerevan, Armenia
- Feast: January 25.; Tuesday after fifth Sunday after the feast of the Holy Cross (Armenian Apostolic Church)

Ananias of Damascus (/ˌænəˈnaɪəs/ AN-ə-NY-əs; Ancient Greek: Ἀνανίας, romanized: Ananíās; Aramaic: ܚܢܢܝܐ, romanized: Ḥananyō; "favoured of the LORD") was a disciple of Jesus in Damascus, mentioned in the Acts of the Apostles in the Bible, which describes how he was sent by Jesus to restore the sight of Saul of Tarsus (who later was called Paul the Apostle) and provide him with additional instruction in the way of the Lord.

== New Testament narrative of Ananias ==
According to Acts 9:10, Ananias was living in Damascus. In Paul's speech in Acts 22, he describes Ananias as "a devout man according to the law, having a good report of all the Jews" that dwelt in Damascus (Acts 22:12). According to F. F. Bruce, this indicates that he was not one of the refugees from the persecution in Jerusalem described in Acts 8:1.

=== Healing of Saul ===
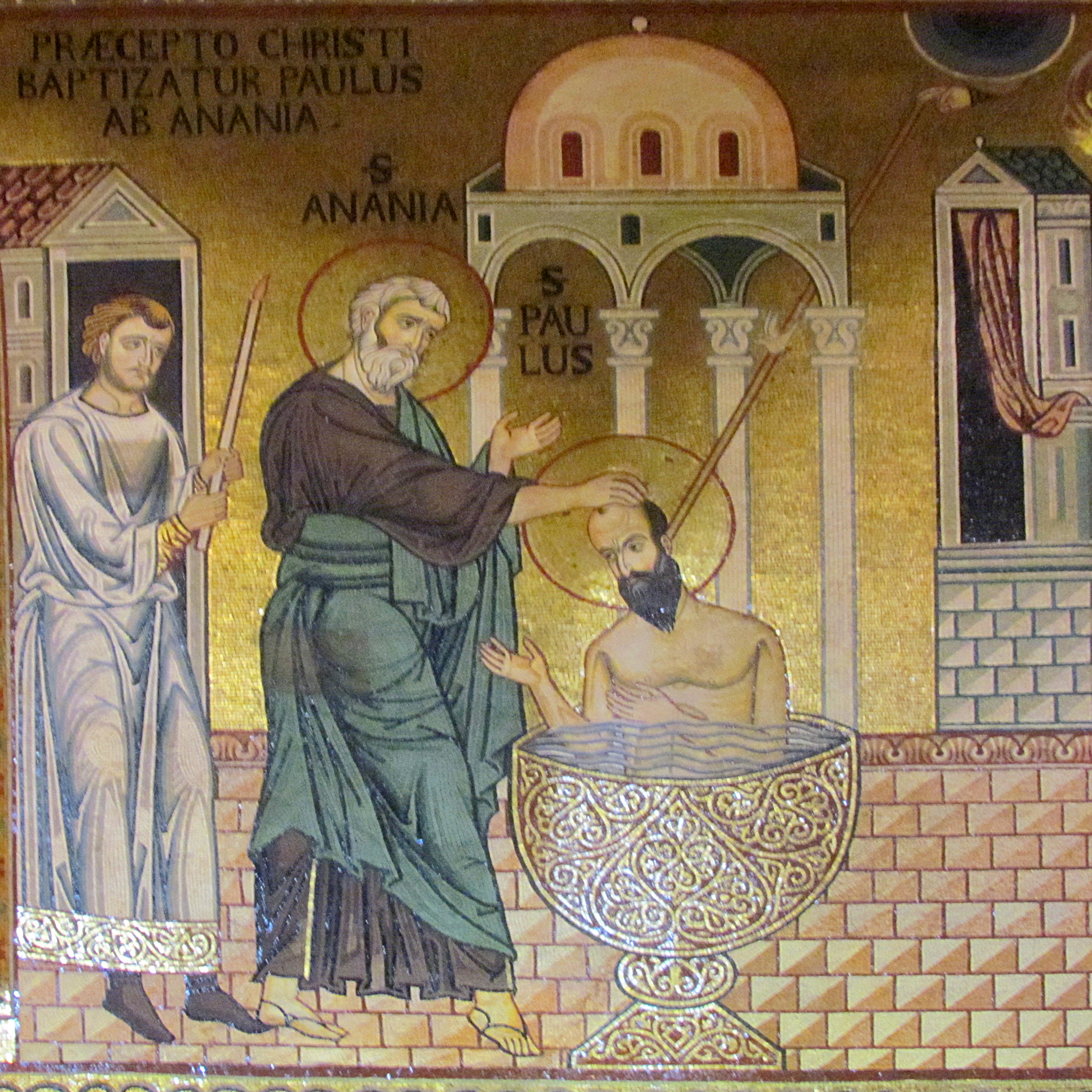
Baptism of St. Paul by Anania, Cappella Palatina

During Paul's conversion experience, Jesus had told Paul (who was then called Saul) to go into the city and wait. Jesus later spoke to Ananias in a vision, and told him to go to the "street which is called Straight", and ask "in the house of Judas for one called Saul, of Tarsus". (Acts 9:11) Ananias objected that Saul had been persecuting "thy saints", but the Lord told him that Saul was "a chosen vessel unto me, to bear my name before the Gentiles, and kings, and the children of Israel". (Acts 9:15). When Ananias went in to Saul and laid his hands on him, the "scales" of dead tissue on the surface of his eyes fell off, and he looked up at Ananias. After additional instruction, Saul was baptized (Acts 9:18; Acts 22:16).

== Biblical status by modern scholars ==
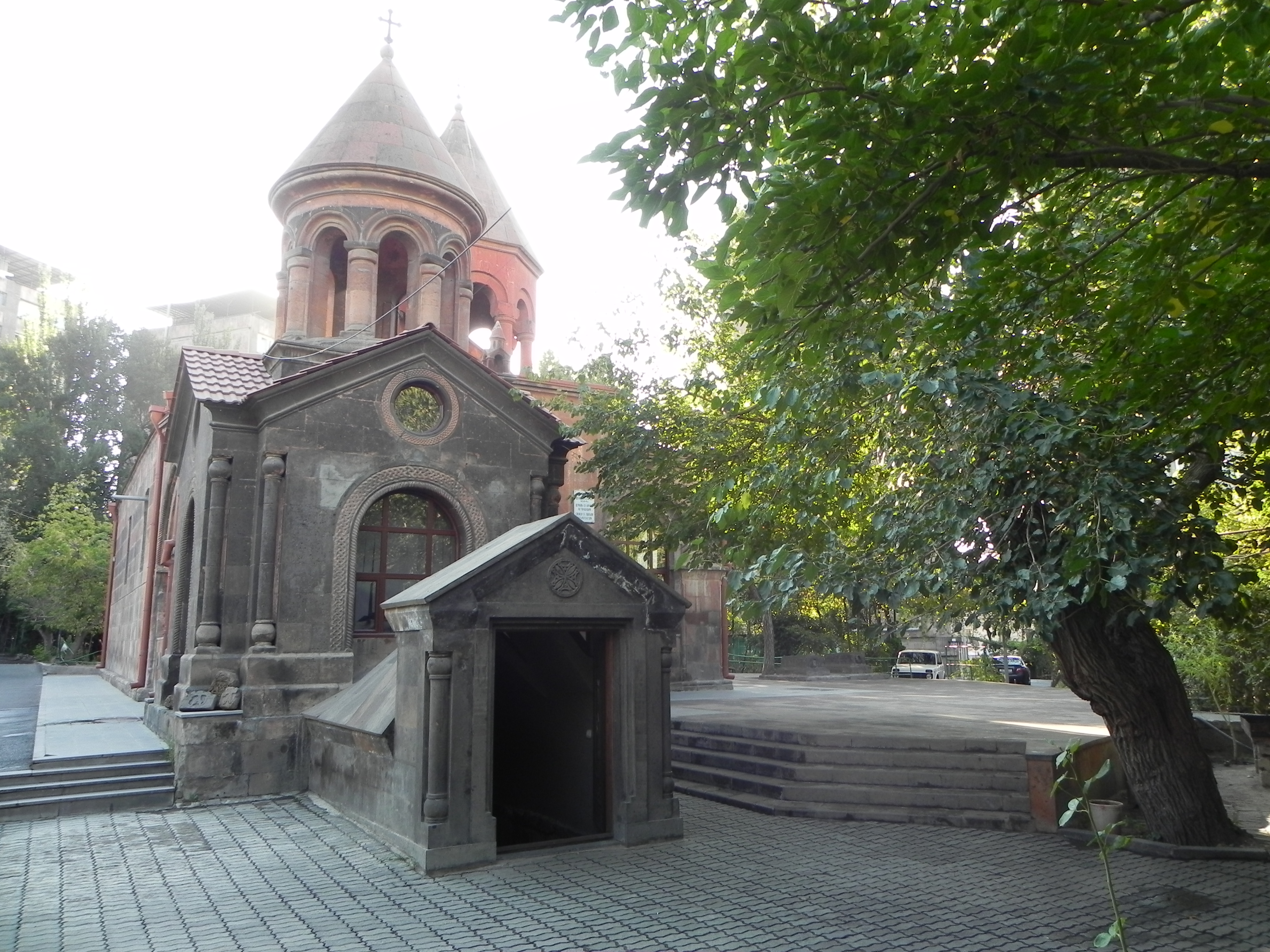
The chapel of Ananias at the Zoravor Surp Church, Yerevan, Armenia

According to Roderick L. Evans, Ananias was a prophet despite being mentioned as a disciple. In his opinion on New Testament prophets, biblical figures who receive a message from God or reveal future events are considered prophets despite alternative titles such as apostle or disciple. Anglican priest and theologian Edward Carus Selwyn recognized Ananias as a prophet as well as one of the seventy disciples and the apostles allocated with different tasks. F. F. Bruce suggests that Ananias "has an honoured place in sacred history, and a special claim upon the gratitude of all who in one way or another have entered into the blessing that stems from the life and work of the great apostle." Ananias is also listed by Hippolytus of Rome and others as one of the seventy disciples whose mission is recorded in Luke 10:1–20.

Ananias is mentioned in late records as having been martyred in Damascus. A tomb is located below the Zoravor Church in Yerevan, Armenia.

== Veneration ==
=== Roman Catholicism ===
In the 2004 edition of Roman Martyrology, Ananias is listed under 25 January as a saint commemorated on the same day as the Feast of the Conversion of St Paul.

=== Eastern Orthodoxy ===
The Eastern Orthodox Church commemorates Ananias on October 1.

=== Oriental Orthodoxy ===
The Coptic Orthodox Church commemorates Ananias on Paoni 27.

== See also ==
- House of Saint Ananias, the supposed house of Ananias in Damascus
