= Bab al-Faraj (Damascus) =

Coordinates: 33.513327°N 36.303582°E

- باب الفرج
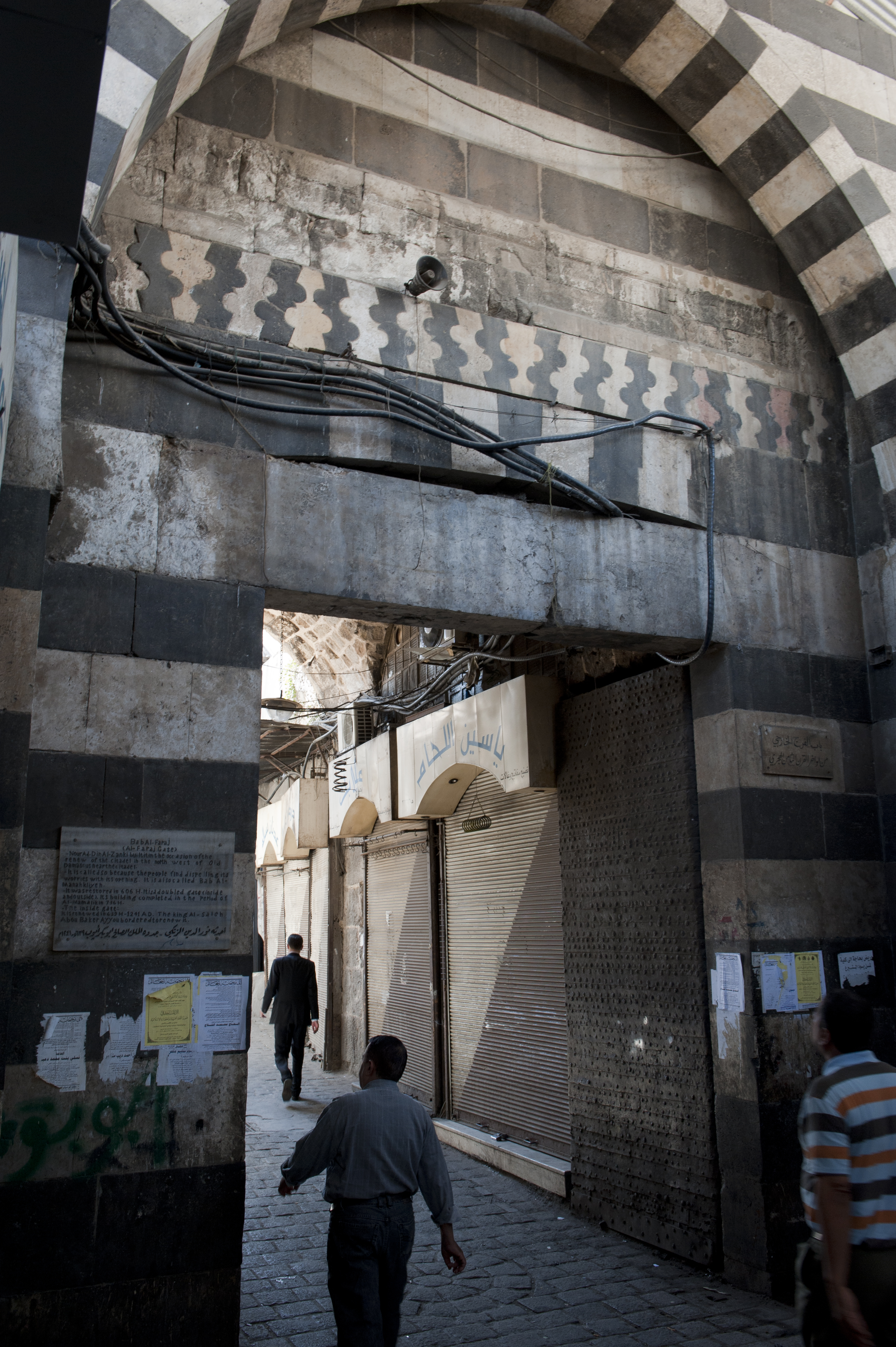
- Interactive map of the Bab al-Faraj area
- Alternative names: Bab al-Bawabijiyah; Bab al-Manakhiliya

General information
- Type: City gate
- Location: Damascus, Syria
- Completed: 1154

Bab al-Faraj (Arabic: باب الفرج; "The Gate of Deliverance") also known as Bab al-Bawabijiyah (Arabic: باب البوابجية) and Bab al-Manakhiliyah (Arabic: باب المناخلية) is one of the gates of the old city of Damascus in Syria. The gate was built as part of a large program to re-fortify the city following its capture by Nur ad-Din Zangi in 1154. The twin gate crosses a bridge over a section of the Barada river that runs along the northern city walls of Damascus. The gate is notable for being the only surviving gate in the city that was built completely after the Muslim conquest of Damascus.

== History ==
The gate, located in the northern walls near the northeast corner of the citadel, was built by Nur ad-Din Zangi in 1154–55. Al-Malik al-Salih fortified the gate further in 1239–40 and added another gateway to the north of the original gate. Bab al-Faraj was rebuilt again in 1396–97 under the Mamluks. The gate was further renovated and restored in the 1980s. The two separate gateways are connected by a narrow steel-roofed alley that serves nowadays as a souq for small hardware and keys. The northern gateway opens up to the modern street of al-Malik Faisal, and still serves as the main northwestern entrance to the old city.

The eastern jamb on the original gate of Nur ad-Din Zangi is still visible, while the western one has been absorbed by the surrounding shops. The jamb is decorated with a combination of Aleppan-styled moldings and engravings of three-leaves without stems. The later additions of al-Malik al-Salih included a monolithic column re-used as a lintel, and the four corbels above the relieving arch.
