= Racqy Synagogue =

Former synagogue in Damascus, Syria

- Arabic: كنيس الراكي; Hebrew: אל ראקי
- Location of the former synagogue in Damascus

Religion
- Affiliation: Judaism (former)
- Ecclesiastical or organizational status: Synagogue (19th century–1940s)
- Status: Abandoned

Location
- Location: Muhammed Samir Darwish Street, Jewish Quarter, Old City, Damascus
- Country: Syria
- Interactive map of Racqy Synagogue
- Coordinates: 33°30′26″N 36°18′45″E

Architecture
- Completed: 19th century
- Materials: Basalt stone; timber

The Racqy Synagogue (Arabic: كنيس الراكي; Hebrew: אל ראקי) is a former Jewish congregation and synagogue, located in the Jewish Quarter of the Old City of Damascus, in Syria. The synagogue was completed in the second half of the 19th century.

== Location ==
The Racqy Synagogue is located in the Old City of Damascus on the east side of Muhammed Samir Darwish Street (Arabic: شارع محمد سمير درویش) approximately 20 m (66 ft) south of Talat al-Hidjara Street and 40 m (130 ft) north of the Red Mosque.

== History ==
The synagogue was completed in the second half of the 19th century. During the early 20th century, it was one of many synagogues in operation in the city. Following pogroms in Syria, in the 1940s, such as the 1949 Menarsha synagogue attack, following the establishment of the State of Israel, most of the Jews of Damascus left the country, followed by another wave in 1992 when Hafez al-Assad's government allowed emigration out of the country. Very few Jews remained, and the synagogue became abandoned.

== Architecture ==
Similar to the other Damascan synagogues, the Racqy Synagogue has a rectangular floor plan and is constructed from basalt stones. As customary in the city, it is decorated with black and white tiles. The soft-pointed arches rest on bright cyllindrical columns. The ceiling is made from traditional poplar wood.

== See also ==
- History of the Jews in Syria
- List of synagogues in Syria
