= Menarsha Synagogue =

Historic synagogue in Damascus, Syria

- Arabic: كنيس المنشارة; Hebrew: בית כנסת אלמנשה
- Location of the former synagogue in Damascus

Religion
- Affiliation: Judaism (former)
- Ecclesiastical or organizational status: Synagogue (19th century–1949)
- Status: Abandoned

Location
- Location: al-Mansha Street, Jewish Quarter, Old City, Damascus
- Country: Syria
- Interactive map of Menarsha Synagogue
- Coordinates: 33°30′29″N 36°18′46″E

Architecture
- Completed: 19th century
- Destroyed: 1949 (partial)

The Menarsha Synagogue (Arabic: كنيس المنشارة; Hebrew: בית כנסת אלמנשה), also known as the Great Synagogue of Damascus, is a historic synagogue in the Jewish Quarter of the Old City of Damascus, in Syria. Completed in the 19th century, the synagogue was the target of a terrorist attack in 1949. The building was partially destroyed and has not been used as a synagogue since the anti-Jewish pogroms in the 1940s.

== Location ==
The synagogue is located in the Jewish Quarter, on the east side of al-Mansha Street (Arabic: شارع المنشأ), a north-facing cross street of Talat al-Hijara Street (Arabic: شارع تلة الحجارة), opposite to the northern end of the large historical state of Beit Farhi Muallim.

== History ==
The Menarsha Synagogue was built in the second half of the 19th century. On August 5, 1949, the synagogue, which was filled with people for Shabbat services, was the target of a terrorist attack that killed 12 people, most of them children. The attack on the synagogue a year after the establishment of the State of Israel led to a mass exodus of Jews from the city, mostly to the newly-formed State of Israel. A second wave, mostly to the United States, occurred in 1992 when the government of Hafez al-Assad allowed Jews to leave the country. There are very few Jews in the city in modern times, which has led to the closure and inactivity of the synagogue. The last active synagogue in Damascus was the Elfrange Synagogue.

== Architecture ==
The building the synagogue is contained in is a three-Nave hall building on a rectangular ground plan. Its arches rest on white columns with a round cross-section. There is a memorial plaque in the synagogue for the 12 victims of the 1949 terrorist attack.

== See also ==
- History of the Jews in Syria
- List of synagogues in Syria
