= Jewish Quarter of Damascus =

Historical Jewish section of the Old City of Damascus

Jewish Quarter of Damascus حارة اليهود Harat al–Yahud
- Neighborhood
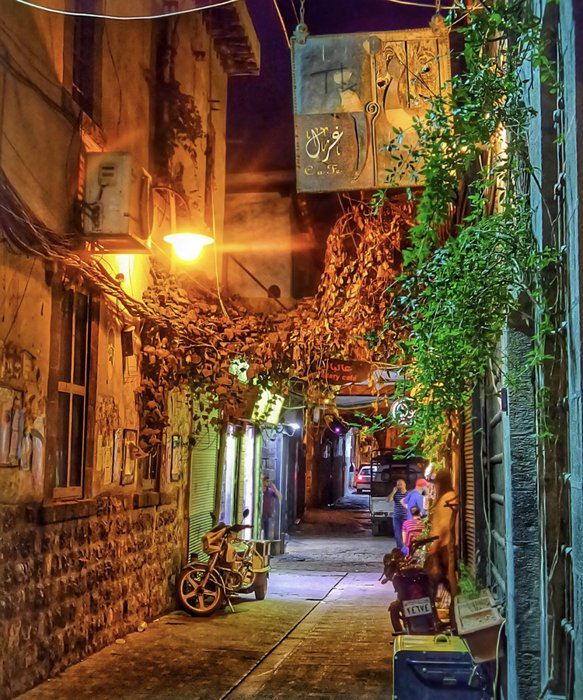

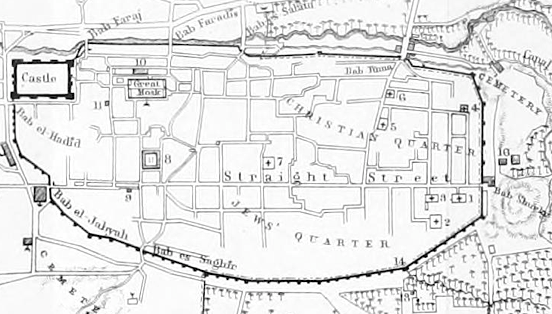
- 1855 map of the Old City of Damascus
- Country: Syria
- Governorate: Damascus Governorate
- City: Damascus
- Established: 1840

The Jewish Quarter of Damascus (Arabic: حارة اليهود, DMG: Ḥārat al-Yahūd) is the quarter in the southeastern part of the Old City of Damascus inhabited mainly by Jews until 1948. The other two quarters are the Muslim Quarter of Damascus in the western half and the Christian Quarter of Damascus (حارة النصارى, DMG Ḥārat an-Naṣārā) in the northeast of the Old City.

== Name ==
The Jewish Quarter of the Old City of Damascus was not the only predominantly Jewish district in the present-day urban area of the capital. Until the devastating riots during the Damascus Affair in 1840, Jews also predominantly lived in the once-independent village of Jobar, which lies 2 km northeast of the city gate Bab Sharqi, but today belongs to the capital. The synagogue there stood even after the exodus of the Jews until its complete destruction in the civil war in Syria. Nevertheless, in publications "Jewish Quarter of Damascus" means the quarter in the Old City. (Note: See also the Jewish Quarter on the map: J. L. Porter: Map of Damascus. In: Five years in Damascus: Including an Account of the History, Topography, and Antiquities of That City; with Travels and Researches in Palmyra, Lebanon, and the Hauran, Five years in Damascus. J. Murray, London 1855.)

On more recent city maps, instead of the name Hārat al-Yahūd (sometimes the transcription Hâret al-Yahoud), it is more common to find the name al-Amīn (الأمين), based on the north–south running street that borders the neighborhood to the west. According to the head of the Jewish community, Albert Qamoo, the name al-Amīn derives from a Shiite scholar who moved to the Jewish quarter a few decades before the exodus of Jews from Damascus.

== Expansion ==
In the middle of Straight Street (الشارع المستقيم, DMG aš-Šāriʿ al-Mustaqīm), which runs from Bāb al-Jābiya (باب الجابية) in the west to the eastern gate Bāb Sharqī (باب شرقي), there is a Roman triumphal arch. This is considered the boundary between the Muslim quarter to the west and the Christian and Jewish parts to the east, with, for the most part, the Christian quarter to the north of Straight Street and the former Jewish quarter to the south. However, the area south of the Straight Street between the dead-end Ḥārat az-Zaitūn (حارة الزيتون 'Olive Lane') and the Bāb Sharqī, which is dominated by three cathedrals and their facilities, also belongs to the Christian quarter. The section of Straight Street east of the Roman Triumphal Arch, (i.e. in the area of the Christian Quarter), is officially called Šāriʿ Bāb Šarqī (شارع باب شرقي). About 80 m west of the Arc de Triomphe, the street Šāriʿ al-Amīn (شارع الأمين) branches off to the south, the former "Jewish street" Šāriʿ al-Yahūd (شارع اليهود), which borders the Jewish quarter to the west, while directly by the Arc de Triomphe, the asch-Shalah Street (جادة الشلاح, DMG Šāriʿ as-Šalāḥ) runs parallel to the aforementioned to its east.

== Description of the Quarter ==
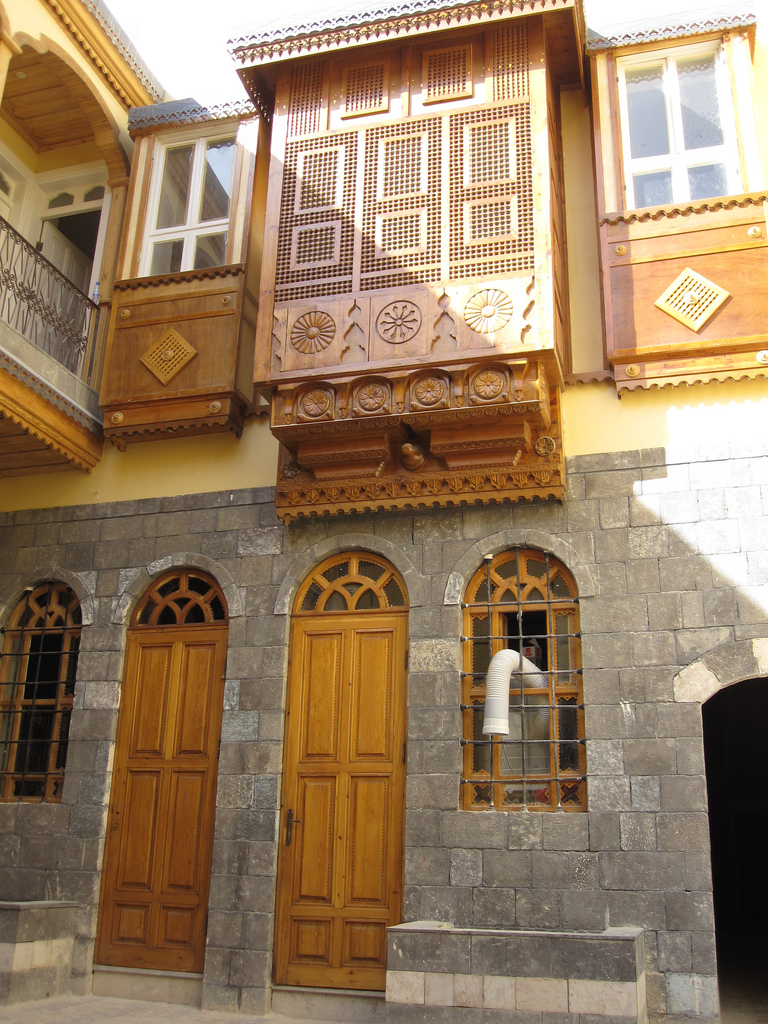
Bayt Farhi (Bayt al-Muallim), built by the Farhi family in the 18th century

In 2006, travel book author Diana Darke described the Jewish Quarter as run-down and abandoned, as the Jews of Damascus left the city beginning in the late 1940s, most recently in a wave of emigration in the 1990s. She observed four abandoned synagogues, all from the 19th and 20th centuries. Many houses were recorded as dilapidated and in ruins. Before the Civil War, there were plans to revitalize the Quarter, but those plans were indefinitely halted with the beginning of the Civil War.

200 m south of the Arc de Triomphe and Bāb Sharqī Street stands asch-Shurafāʾ Alley (Al-Shorfaa, زقاق الشرفاء) near al-Amīn Street stands the "Arab palace" Beit Dahdah (بيت الدحداح, DMG Bait ad-Daḥdaḥ), (Note: Beit means both in Arabic (بيت, DMG bait) and in Hebrew (בית or. בֵּית) "House".) formerly belonging to the Jewish merchant and banker Farhi family (فارحي, DMG Fārḥī) and named after its owner Murād (Mordechai) Farhi (مراد (موردخاي) فارحي). Beit Murād Farhi (بيت مراد فارحي), was later purchased by the Christian Dahdah family. Along the west–east running Talat-al-Hijāra Street (شارع تلة الحجارة, "Stone Mound Street"), several old houses of the Farhi family are lined up in a row, including the large Beit Farhi-Muallim (بيت فارحي-المعلّم) and the present-day Tālīsmān al-Amīn Hotel (تاليسمان الأمين). Two other estates of former Sephardic families on this street are Beit Liniado (بيت لنيادو) and Beit Lisbona (بيت لزبونا). The Lisbona family came to Damascus from Lisbon after the Reconquista. In the 1970s, Beit Lisbona was home to a Jewish school, where it remained until the exodus of the last Jewish children in 1992. It was then sold to the Christian Haddad family.

From the east gate, passing the "olive alley" to the south, walking along Straight Street, one will come through a small park that is often used by youths for romantic meetings. It is named Qischla, the Turkish word for "barracks", because the land the park is located on was formerly the location of Ottoman army barracks.

=== Synagogues ===
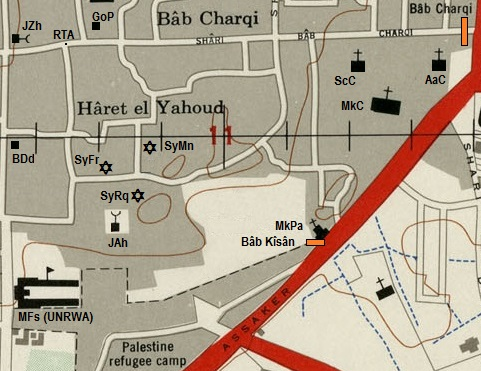
1958 map of the Jewish quarter with changed borders and Palestinian camp Synagogues: SyMn: Menarsha Synagogue SyRq: Racqy Synagogue SyFr: Frankish Synagogue

According to a Syrian tourist guide, there are still three intact synagogues in the Jewish quarter: The Menarsha Synagogue (كنيس المنشارة) and the Racqy Synagogue (كنيس الراكي) are still standing, but unused. The Elfrange Synagogue (كنيس الفرنج) near the Beit Mourad Farhi is the only one in Damascus that still holds services, with many of the few Jews left in the city attending it. The Jobar Synagogue was razed to the ground in 2013 during the Civil War and located in then-rebel-held Jobar, and was located 2 km to the northeast of the Old City. Further south in the Jewish Quarter, is the Red Mosque (Damascus) (الجامع الأحمر) of Damascus. (Note: The Red Mosque is also listed as Jâmi al-'Ahmar (الجامع الأحمر) in an older sketch of the Jewish quarter (undated) when the Alliance Israélite Universelle (AIU) school, which closed in 1948, still existed. See sketch under Kataf, Rania p. 15. Figure 1. No. 9. Jameh el Ahmar.)

== History ==
=== Pre-Islamic period ===
Jews have historically inhabited Damascus since the time of King David, around 1000 BC. Under Roman rule, the Jewish population numbered 10,000 in the city, ruled by an ethnarch. 9th chapter of the Acts of the Apostles Paul is sent with letters to the synagogues in Damascus that followers of Jesus should be imprisoned in them (Acts 9:2 EU). After his time in Damascus, Paul successfully converted a portion of the Jews in the Quarter to Christianity. The ethnarch attempted to arrest Paul, but Paul escaped through Bab Kisan. (Acts 9:25 EU).

In the First Jewish-Roman War, many Jews were killed by pagan inhabitants of the city. (Note: Josephus: [The Jewish War]], ii. 20, § 2; vii. 8, § 7) In the 5th century, when Christianity was the state religion of the Roman Empire, Rabbi Rafram bar Pappa preached in the Jobar Synagogue. (Note: Babylonian Talmud, Berachot 50a)

=== Islamic conquest ===
The Islamic conquest of Damascus in 634 by Khalid ibn al-Walid marked the beginning of Islamic rule over the city. In 706, Caliph al-Walid I had the Cathedral of St. John the Baptist converted into the Umayyad Mosque, but concurrently decreed that Christians could continue to visit their remaining churches and Jews their synagogues, albeit as dhimmis upon payment of the jizya. Ibn Asakir reported in the early 12th century, 8 of the city's 14 churches had fallen into disrepair, 1 had been destroyed, and 3 were rebuilt. The synagogues had been converted into mosques.

=== Crusades and Christian rule ===
After the Siege of Jerusalem in 1099 during the First Crusade, there was an influx of 50,000 Jews to Damascus, fleeing from the Crusaders. The community became one of the largest in the world at the time. The long-established Jews in Palestine and Syria were called "Musta'arabim" (Arabic speakers) or Moriscos (now Mizrahim). In addition, there were the Sephardic Jews who came to the country through expulsion from Spain after the Fall of Granada who spoke Ladino, a Romance language with Hebrew influence.

=== Ottoman rule ===
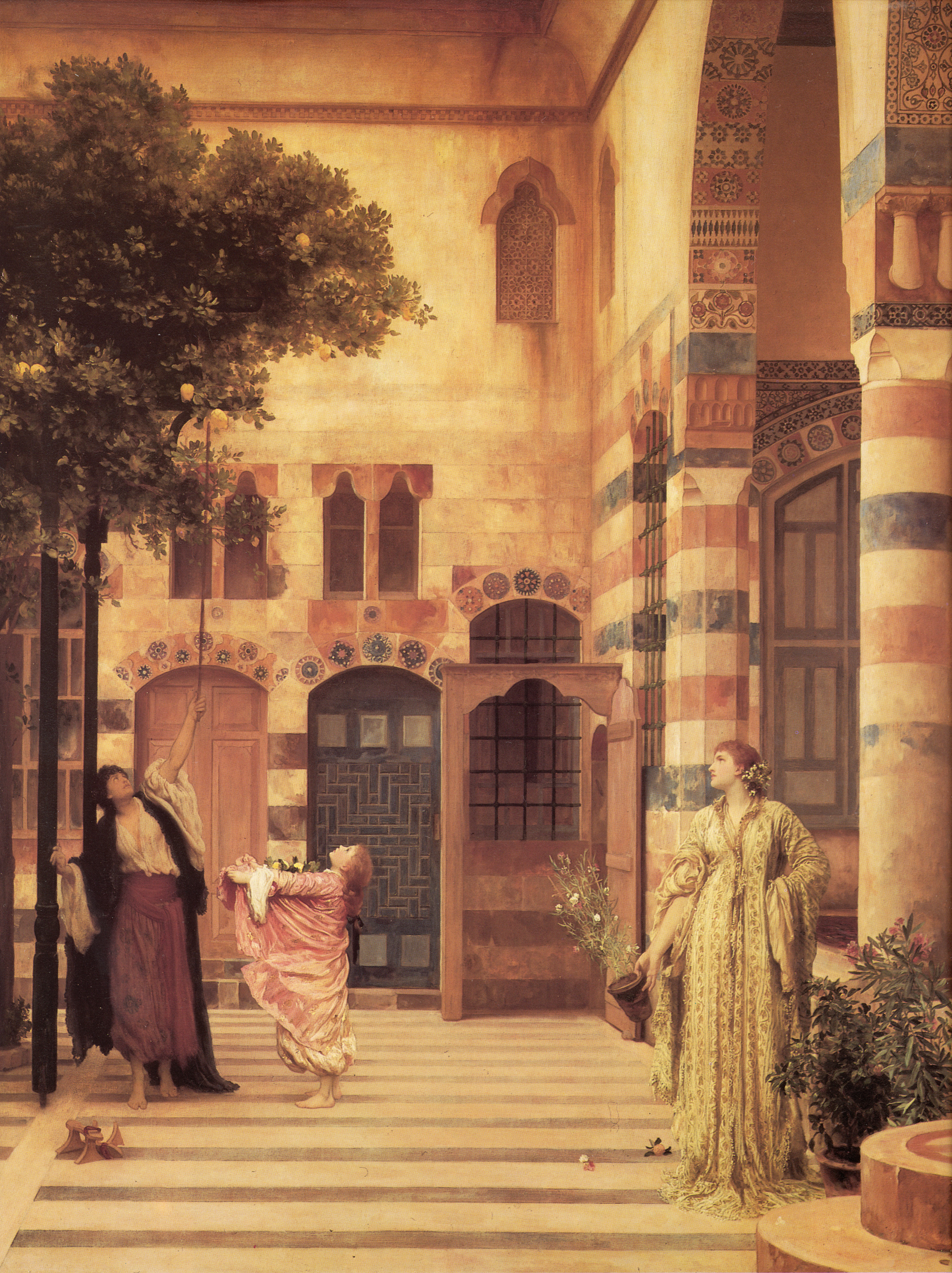
Old Damascus, Jew's Quarter (1874), by Frederick Leighton

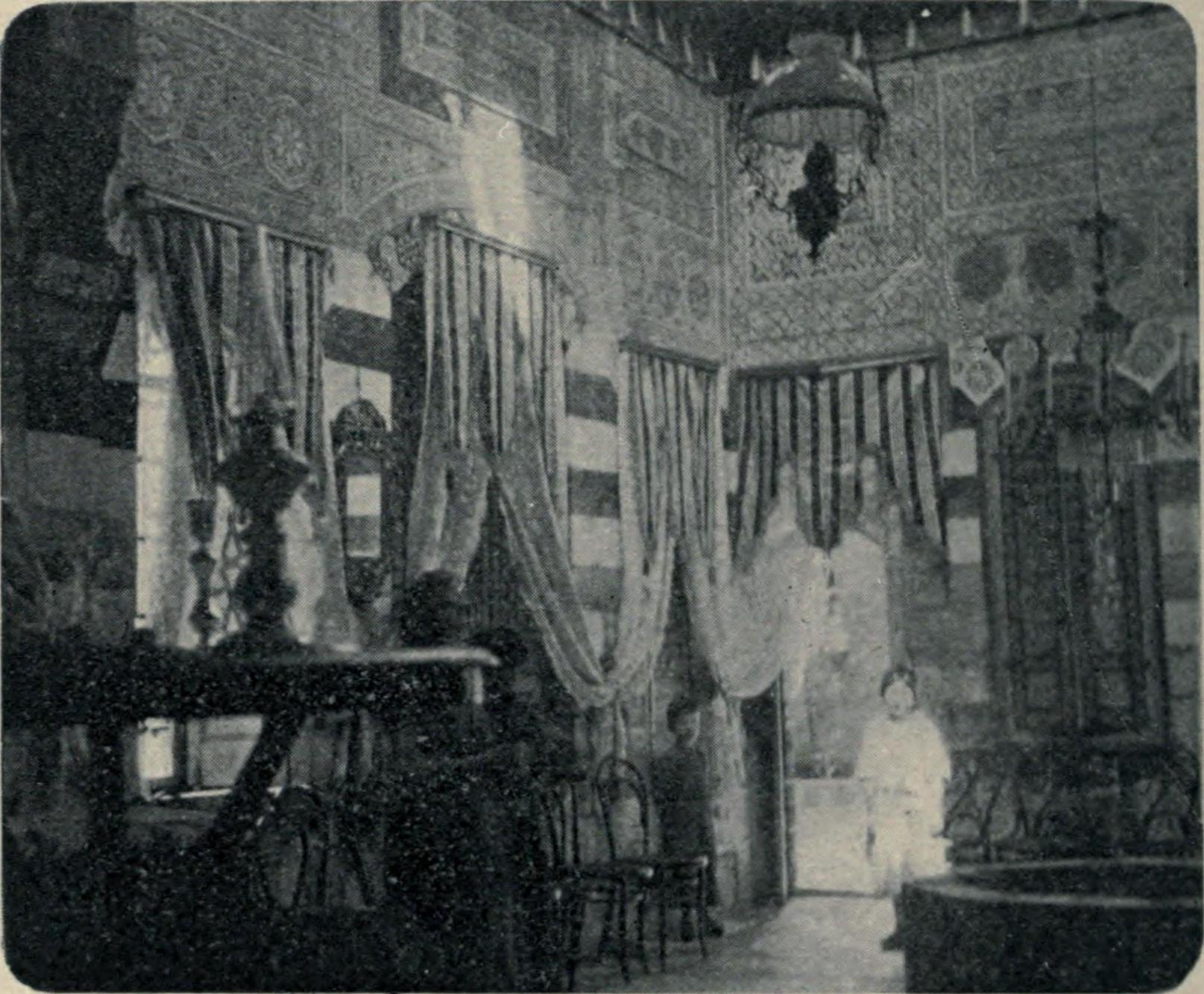
Interior of a Jewish home in Damascus. Before 1905

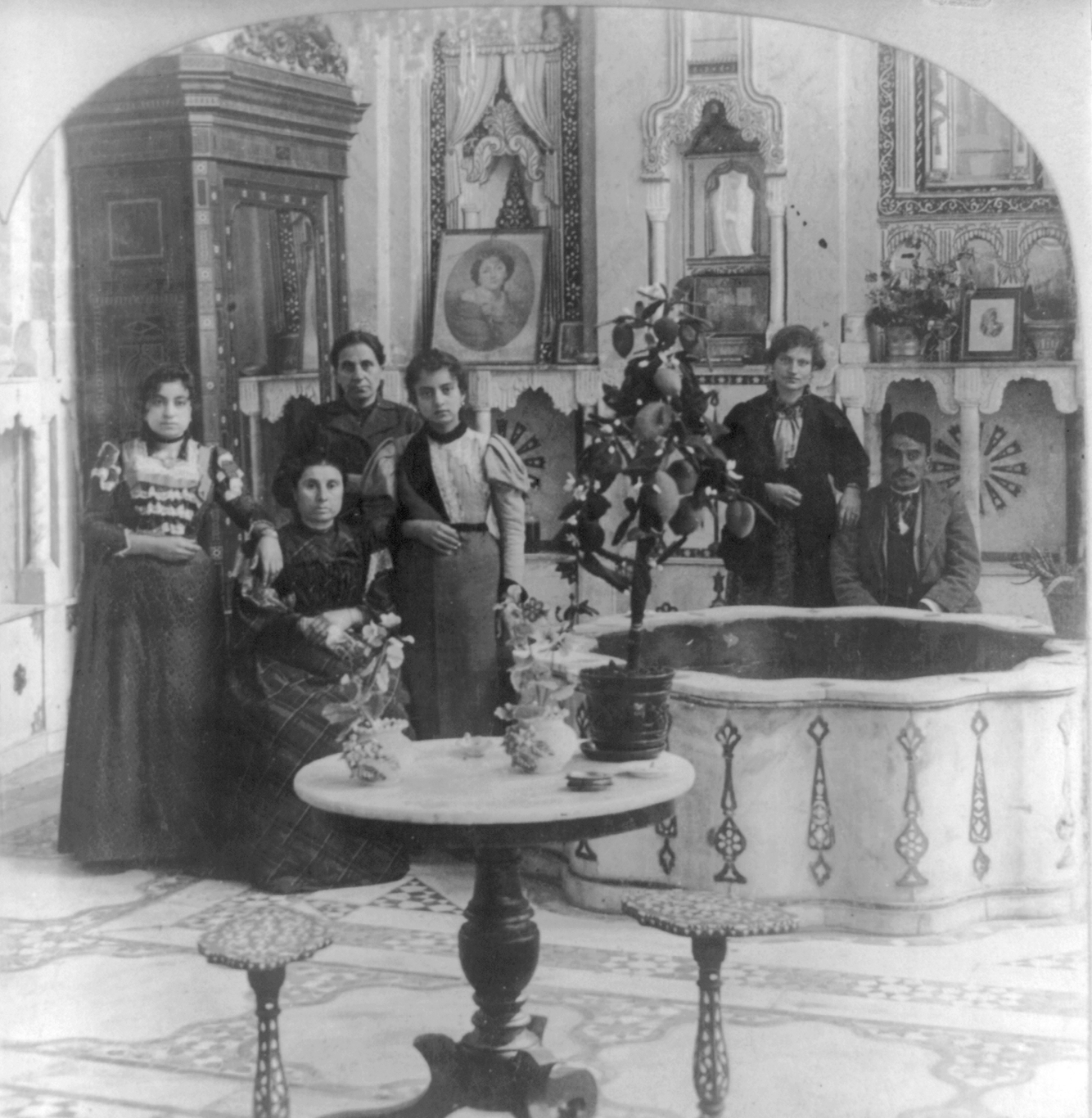
Jewish family in Damascus, 1910

In the 17th to the 19th centuries, many Jews from Italy and France came to Damascus as merchants, who became known as the "Frank Lords" (Señores Francos). These European Jews typically retained their citizenship and were thus not subject to Islamic jurisdiction as dhimmis, but to the European consular courts in accordance with the capitulations of the Ottoman Empire. In the mid-19th century, of the 4,000 Jews in Damascus, only about 1,000 were dhimmis who were obliged to pay the poll tax. In the Municipal Council of Damascus at that time, two seats were reserved for Christians and one for a Jew, but these seats were often not filled. The Jewish community of the Karaites died out in Damascus during this period, and their synagogue (Kenessa) was sold to the Melkite Greek Catholic Church. On the site of the Karaite synagogue, the Melkite Cathedral of Damascus, the al-Zeitoun Church, was built from 1832 to 1834.

The disappearance of Father Tomaso and his Muslim servant Ibrahim Amara on February 5, 1840, from the now-defunct Capuchin monastery led to the Damascus Affair, during which Jews of the city were accused of ritual murder and severe rioting against Jews ensued.

After the massacre of nearly 6,000 Christians in Damascus during the Civil War at Mount Lebanon on 9 July 1860 by Druze militias, Jews were accused of massacring Christians in addition to the Muslims and Druze populations. 500 Muslims were hanged in a mass execution under the supervision of Grand Vizier Fuad Pasha. The Jewish community had to pay 4 million piastres, and 200 Jews were planned to be executed as well. In view of their apparent innocence, Fuad Pasha as well as the Prussian consul Johann Gottfried Wetzstein, the English Jewish entrepreneur Moses Montefiore, as well as the bankers Abraham Camondo (Istanbul) and Shemaya Angel (Damascus) intervened, and their execution was prevented.

By 1900, the Jewish quarter of Damascus had eight synagogues, some of which had their origins in the 16th century. The number of Jews in Damascus was estimated at 11,000, 6.875% of the city's total population.

=== Israeli independence ===
In response to the founding of the State of Israel on 14 May 1948, Muslim perpetrators attacked the Menarsha synagogue on 8 August 1949, where twelve people were killed. Many Jews fled the city for Israel, beginning the decline of the Jewish population in the city. The Alliance Israélite Universelle (AIU) school in the south of the Jewish quarter was closed in 1948 and taken over by the United Nations Relief and Works Agency for Palestine Refugees in the Near East (UNRWA). After the Nakba, the Syrian government housed Palestinian refugees in abandoned dwellings in the Jewish Quarter of Damascus. According to the head of the Jewish community, Albert Qamoo, this led to considerable conflict, whereas previously Jewish relations with the city's Muslims and Christians had been cordial.

The Jews in Syria lived under strict restrictions during this period. For example, only individuals, rather than families, were allowed to travel out of the country in order to prevent families from escaping to Israel. The Jewish cemetery located beyond the city wall south of the Jewish quarter was built over with the highway to Damascus International Airport. In 1992, the Jewish population of Damascus was 4,000. Beginning with Passover in 1992, the government of Hafez al-Assad allowed Syria's Jews to leave the country if they promised that they would not immigrate to Israel. Within a few months, a large number of them emigrated to the United States, especially Brooklyn, and some to France and Turkey. The Jewish quarter of Damascus was subsequently described as "90% empty".

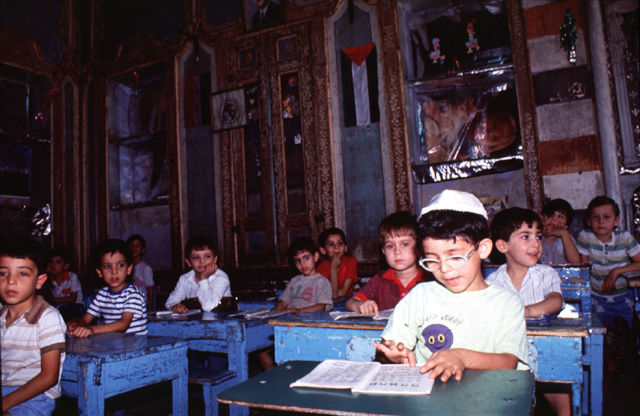
Jewish students learning at Lisbon (Maimonides) school in Damascus, 1991

Before the civil war, there were plans to turn the area into an artists' quarter. The al-Menarsha Synagogue and the al-Racqy Synagogue survived the bombing and are still accessible, but are not currently in use. Only the al-Faranj Synagogue (also: al-Faranj, al-Frenj, or Elfrange), the "Frankish Synagogue," still holds services, and very few Jews still live in the city. A November 2019 Times of Israel report claimed that there is not a single Jew left in Syria. This is contradicted by research conducted by journalist and photographer Rania Kataf, who located and interviewed twelve Jews, all of advanced age, still living in Damascus in 2019 and 2020 as Syria's last Jews. In 2019, they ensured the renovation of their last active synagogue, the al-Farandsch Synagogue. It is considered the oldest synagogue still standing in Damascus and is believed to have been founded by Sephardic Jews who came to Damascus as refugees in the late 15th century after Spain's Reconquista. Russian President Vladimir Putin announced in 2019 that he would help Jews in Syria rebuild their holy sites.

== Economy ==
Among the Jews of Damascus, there was an upper, middle, and lower class, all three of which were present in the Jewish quarter. The upper class included bankers and textile merchants, and the trade in gold and diamonds was largely dominated by Jews until the time of the Republic. The Farhi banking family, which owned several luxuriant houses in the Jewish quarter, played a significant role in serving the banking and taxation system of the Ottoman Empire. Many Jews of Damascus worked as artisans, silver/goldsmiths, or in forging copper and brass. Many women also worked in these vocations. Jewish artisan Maurice Nseiri, who was born in Damascus in 1944 and emigrated to the U.S. in 1992, not only furnished the al-Farandsh synagogue with his silver-worked brass, but also designed the large gates of the Syrian presidential palace in Damascus and supplied mosques, royal palaces, and wealthy gentlemen in Saudi Arabia, Qatar, and Kuwait. Other Jews held positions in science, medicine, and technology, with physicians Hasbani and Totah, among others, being well-known and popular in Damascus. Many men worked as Kosher butchers, and many Jewish women worked as tailors in one of the many sewing workshops in the Jewish quarter.

Under Shukri al-Quwatli, Jewish economic life was massively restricted in 1948. Many Jews dealt pragmatically with the arrival of Palestinians after 1948 by employing them in their businesses, causing a reduction in tensions. The Jews of Damascus generally saw the rule of Hafiz al-Assad as a time of relief and a new economic flourishing, in which the Jews were once again treated as citizens of Syria after a long time and opened businesses outside their neighborhoods.

The houses abandoned by the Jews were managed by the "Jewish Property Foundation" (مؤسسة أملاك اليهود). Some of the houses were rented to non-Jewish Syrians, some were sold, while others were left to the responsibility of the chairman of the Jewish community to deal with. Rachel and Albert Qamoo stated in 2019 that their most important task in life is to secure all the synagogues of Damascus for the future, before they can emigrate in peace to their relatives.

== Sources ==
- Kataf, Rania (November 2020). Hidden Stories of Damascene Jews (PDF) (in German). Minor-Kontor.
