= Elfrange Synagogue =

Synagogue in Damascus, Syria

- Arabic: كنيس الفرنج; Hebrew: בית כנסת אלפרנג'
- Location of the synagogue in Damascus

Religion
- Affiliation: Judaism
- Rite: Nusach Sefard
- Ecclesiastical or organizational status: Synagogue
- Status: Active

Location
- Location: Jewish Quarter, Old City, Damascus
- Country: Syria
- Interactive map of Elfrange Synagogue
- Coordinates: 33°30′27″N 36°18′44″E

Architecture
- Established: 15th century (as a congregation)
- Completed: 19th century

The Elfrange Synagogue (Arabic: كنيس الفرنج; Hebrew: בית כנסת אלפרנג', lit. 'Frankish synagogue'), also known as the Faranj Synagogue, is a Jewish congregation and synagogue, located in the Jewish Quarter, in the Old City of Damascus, in Syria. The Elfrange Synagogue is the last synagogue in Syria used for worship by Jews. The name is also transcribed as al-Faranj or al-Firenj.

== Location ==
The synagogue is located in the Jewish Quarter, between the historical estates of Beit Liniado (بيت لنيادو) and Beit Farhi Muallim (بيت فارحي-المعلّم). It is on the east side of a small cul-de-sac known as al-Fannānīn Street.

== History ==
The Faranj Synagogue is considered the oldest of the still-extant synagogues in the Old City of Damascus. According to oral tradition of Damascene Jews, it was founded by Sephardic refugees at the end of the 15th century following the Reconquista, with the synagogue operating in Judaeo-Spanish. The temple was named "Franj" (Arabic: فرنج) after the Franks, European foreigners. However, the modern structure of the synagogue was built in the second half of the 19th century. Following 1949 pogroms in Syria, many Jews fled and left the country, dwindling the local population able to attend the synagogue. A second wave of immigration occurred following an edict by Hafez al-Assad allowing Jews to leave the country. In 2020, journalist Rania Kataf claimed that 12 Jews still resided in the city, all elderly, who renovated the synagogue in 2019. In February 2025, Rabbi Yusuf Hamra and his son Henry, along with a small delegation of Jewish religious officials and Stephen Rapp, a former U.S. diplomat, visited the synagogue for the first time since it closed in the 1990s.

== Architecture ==
The Elfrange is a three-Nave temple on a rectangular base. Its round arches rest on cylindrical, stone pillars. The gates, floor, and bema were designed by Maurice Nseiri, a Jewish artisan who later immigrated to the United States. Unlike the interior, the synagogue's exterior is mostly lacking religious notation.

== See also ==
- History of the Jews in Syria
- List of synagogues in Syria
