= Death of a Monk =

2004 novel by Alon Hilu

- First English edition cover
- Author: Alon Hilu
- Translator: Evan Fallenberg
- Language: Hebrew
- Publisher: חרגול
- Publication date: January 1, 2004

Death of a Monk is a novel by Israeli writer Alon Hilu, published in 2004. An English edition translated by Evan Fallenberg in 2006. The novel is based on the blood libel against the Jews in Damascus, Syria in 1840.

The novel is based around the historical incident known as the Damascus affair, offers a different interpretation, and has caused astonishment among historians by adding a homosexual interpretation for the historical events.

The novel was one of the five finalists of the prestigious Sapir Award in Israel (2005), and was awarded the Presidential Prize for Literature (Israel, 2006). Death of a Monk was written at first in Hebrew and had been translated into English (Harvill Secker, London) and other European languages.

The real historical events of "the Damascus Affair" are the disappearance of a monk on the eve of Passover in the Jewish quarter of Damascus. It led to blood libel against the Jews, putting some of them in jail while others were killed.

The novel Death of a Monk leads to certain inevitable outcomes - though not by expected means - and, in Hilu's imaginative re-telling, not everyone is who they seem to be. Hilu has taken a piece of history and cast it in another light.

Hilu vividly recreates the twisted alleyways of the old city of Damascus, its air scented with anisette, araq, coffee and lemon; he equally vividly reveals the hero's attraction to other men and his perpetual struggle to assert himself.

== Plot ==
The plot occurs in Damascus, 1840. Aslan is a 15 years old religious, Jewish teen, one of the outwardly pampered sons of the Farhi family. Additionally, he is gay. Behind closed doors, he is abused and beaten by his siblings, mother and father; at school the other kids make fun of him, especially when he and Moussa, another delicate lad, are caught holding hands.

The outcome of this tender incident speaks volumes about the power of Aslan's father in the community: when this news gets out, Moussa simply vanishes.

But there's even more going on behind the Farhi household doors. When his father is away, Aslan's mother dresses her son in her clothes, shoes and make-up - and these are their most (and maybe the only) intimate moments together. At any other time, she sides against him with the rest of the family. Miserable, Aslan grasps at anything he can to put himself out of his misery, including trying to become fatally infected when there's an outbreak of the plague.

When his father marries him off at the age of 15 to a rabbi's daughter, things go from bad to worse as Aslan is unable to consummate the marriage. His solution involved succumbing to passions of his own, a tremulous step that takes him down a secretive road of pleasure mixed with fear.

As he becomes bolder in his forays to explore and enjoy the forbidden nightlife of the city, Aslan becomes enamoured with a young woman singer, Umm-Jihan, and catches the eye of Father Tommaso, an Italian monk. Aslan's meeting and further interaction with the monk spur on the plot, when the monk has a heart attack and dies, while Aslan's secret makes him hide the body. That leads to a blood libel against the Jews, blaming them, with no evidence, for the murder of the monk, in a vicious trial with grim results.

Aslan observes his family's long-standing feud with a rival merchant family, and the blaming of all the community because of his secret and of his being in the closet. One of the memorable things he says is: "why is it that men cannot love one another more, instead of beating and striking, oppressing and debasing, despoiling and destroying?"

Ultimately, his attempts to assert himself to his father prove terrible and tragic.
