= Alon Hilu =

Israeli novelist

- אלון חילו
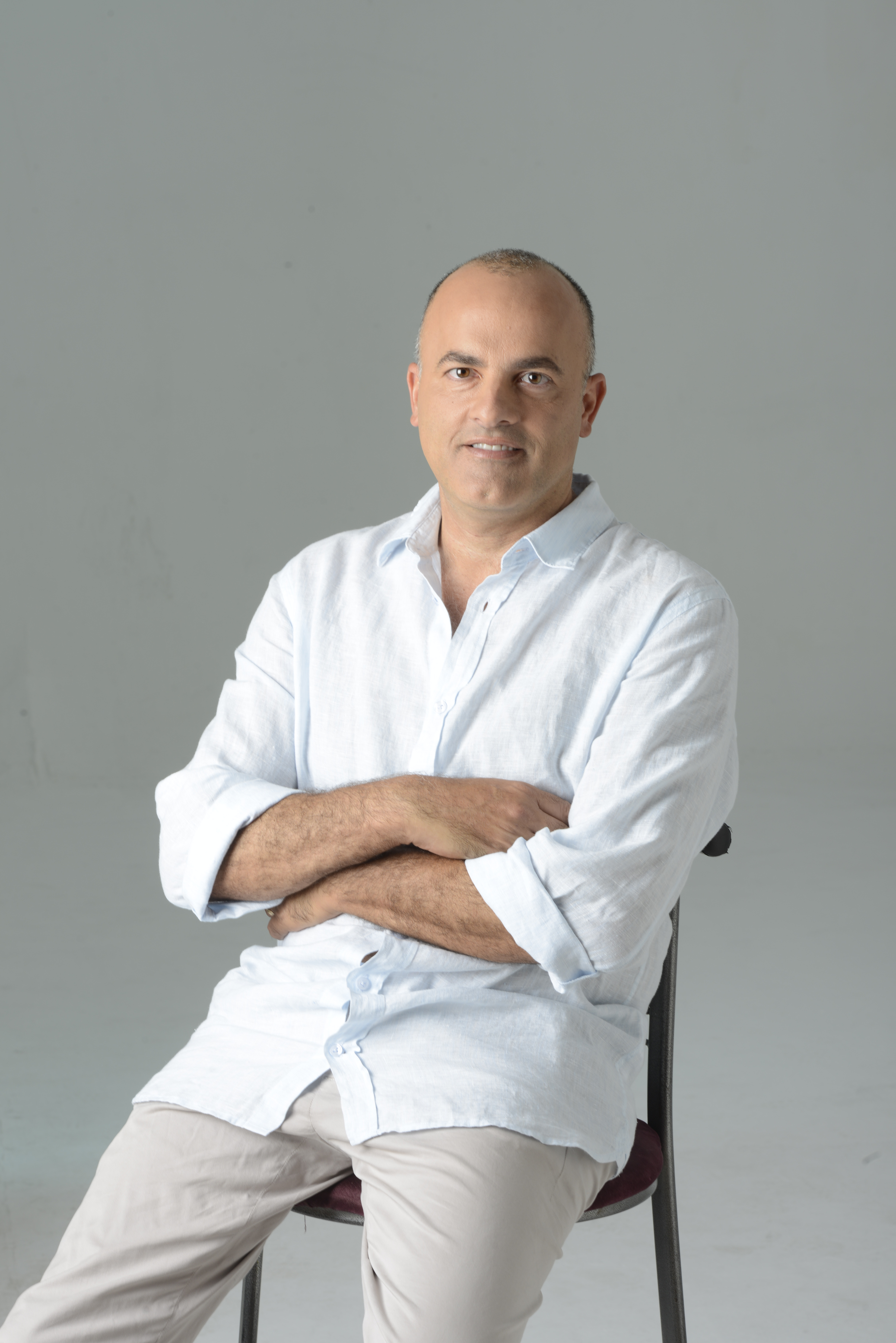
- Born: June 21, 1972 (age 54); Jaffa, Israel
- Occupations: Novelist, Playwright, Attorney
- Writing career
- Notable works: Death of a Monk, The House of Rajani, Murder in the Red House
- Notable awards: Presidential Prize for Literature (2006)

Alon Ḥilu (Hebrew: אלון חילו; born June 21, 1972, Jaffa, Israel) is an Israeli novelist.

Hilu was born to parents who immigrated to Israel from Syria.

His first novel, Death of a Monk (Xargol, 2004), is based on a historical blood libel against the Jews in Damascus, Syria, and offers an original homosexual interpretation for the historical events. The novel was shortlisted for the prestigious Sapir Prize in Israel (2005), was awarded the Presidential Prize for literature (Israel, 2006) and has been translated into English (Harvill Secker, London), French (Edition Du Seuil, Paris), Greek (Metaichmio, Athens) and Dutch (Ambo Anthos, Amsterdam).

Hilu's second novel, The House of Rajani (Harvill Secker, Random House UK), a fictional retelling of the history of early Zionism, was published in Hebrew in February 2008 by Yedioth Sfarim. The novel initially received the 2009 Sapir Prize, but after claims were made regarding a conflict of interests among the judges (Yossi Sarid, the head judge of the committee, was related to the novel's editor) the prize was withdrawn and the award cancelled. Israel's president Shimon Peres called it "an extraordinary book".

His recent book, Murder in the Red House, is a historical novel about the mysterious murder of the renowned writer Yosef Haim Brenner and five of his friends, in a mansion among the orchards of Jaffa in 1921. The novel was published in Hebrew in May 2018 by Yedioth Sfarim.

Hilu earned a degree in dramatic writing at Tel Aviv University, studying under Israel's leading playwrights, such as Yehoshua Sobol and Shmuel Hasfari. His plays, "The Wedding" and "The Day of the Dogs", were produced in theatre festivals in Israel, and were both translated into English for the Harvard Radcliffe Dramatic Club. From 1987 to 1988, Hilu wrote radio plays for Israeli Radio. During the 90s, two of his short stories were published in Israeli literary magazines: "The Biblical Zoo in Jerusalem" (Iton 77, 1992) and "Last Seen" (Moznaim, 1993). In addition to his writing career, Hilu holds a law degree and practices intellectual property law as an attorney.

In 2018, Alon Hilu joined more than 150 Israeli artists, authors, and intellectuals in signing an open letter addressed to Prime Minister Benjamin Netanyahu and members of the Knesset. The letter called for the repeal of Jewish Nation-State Law and changes to the surrogacy law to enable same-sex couples in Israel to access surrogacy services.

== Personal life ==
Hilu came out as gay in 2013. He is divorced and has 2 daughters.
