= Rhodes blood libel =

1840 event of blood libel against Jews

Coordinates: 36°10′N 28°00′E

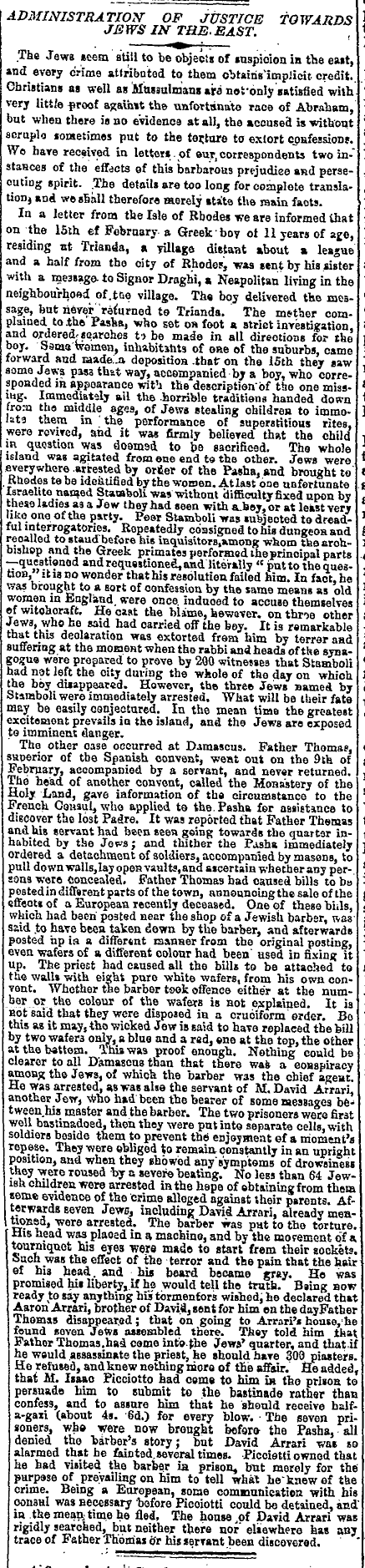
The Rhodes blood libel and the Damascus affair, reported together in The Times, Apr 18, 1840

The Rhodes blood libel was an 1840 event of blood libel against Jews, in which the Greek Orthodox community accused Jews on the island of Rhodes (then part of the Ottoman Empire) of the ritual murder of a Christian boy who disappeared in February of that year.

Initially the libel garnered support from the consuls of several European countries, including the United Kingdom, France, the Austrian Empire, Sweden, and Greece, although later several supported the Jewish community. The Ottoman governor of Rhodes broke with the long tradition of the Ottoman governments (which had previously denied the factual basis of the blood libel accusations) and supported the ritual murder charge. The government arrested several Jewish subjects, some of whom were tortured and confessed. It blockaded the entire Jewish quarter for twelve days.

The Jewish community of Rhodes appealed for help from the Jewish community in Constantinople, who forwarded the appeal to European governments. In the United Kingdom and Austria, Jewish communities gained support from their governments. They sent official dispatches to the ambassadors in Constantinople unequivocally condemning the blood libel. A consensus developed that the charge was false. The governor of Rhodes sent the case to the central government, which initiated a formal inquiry into the affair. In July 1840, that investigation established the innocence of the Jewish community. Finally, in November of the same year, the Ottoman sultan issued a decree (firman) denouncing the blood libel as false.

== Background ==
=== Jewish community ===
The existence of a Jewish community in Rhodes was first documented toward the end of the Hellenistic period. In a Roman decree dated to 142 BC, Rhodes is listed among the areas notified of the renewal of the pact of friendship between the Roman senate and the Jewish nation. The Jews of Rhodes are mentioned in documents at the time of the Arab conquest of the island in the 7th century. In the 12th century, Benjamin of Tudela found some 400 Jews in the city of Rhodes.

In 1481 and 1482, earthquakes destroyed the Jewish quarter so that only 22 families remained in the city. After an epidemic of plague in 1498–1500, the Knights Hospitaller, who ruled the island at that time, expelled those of the remaining Jews who would not be baptized. In the next two decades, the Hospitallers brought to the island between 2,000 and 3,000 captured Jews who were kept as slaves to work on fortifications.

In 1522, these Jews and their descendants helped the Ottomans seize Rhodes. Under the Ottoman rule, Rhodes became an important Sephardi center, home to many rabbis. By the 19th century, the wealthier Jews were merchants in cloth, silk, sulfur, and resins. The rest were small shopkeepers and artisans, street vendors, and fishermen. The community was governed by a council of seven officials. Sources give the number of Jews during the 19th century between 2,000 and 4,000.

=== Blood libel against the Jews in the Ottoman Empire ===
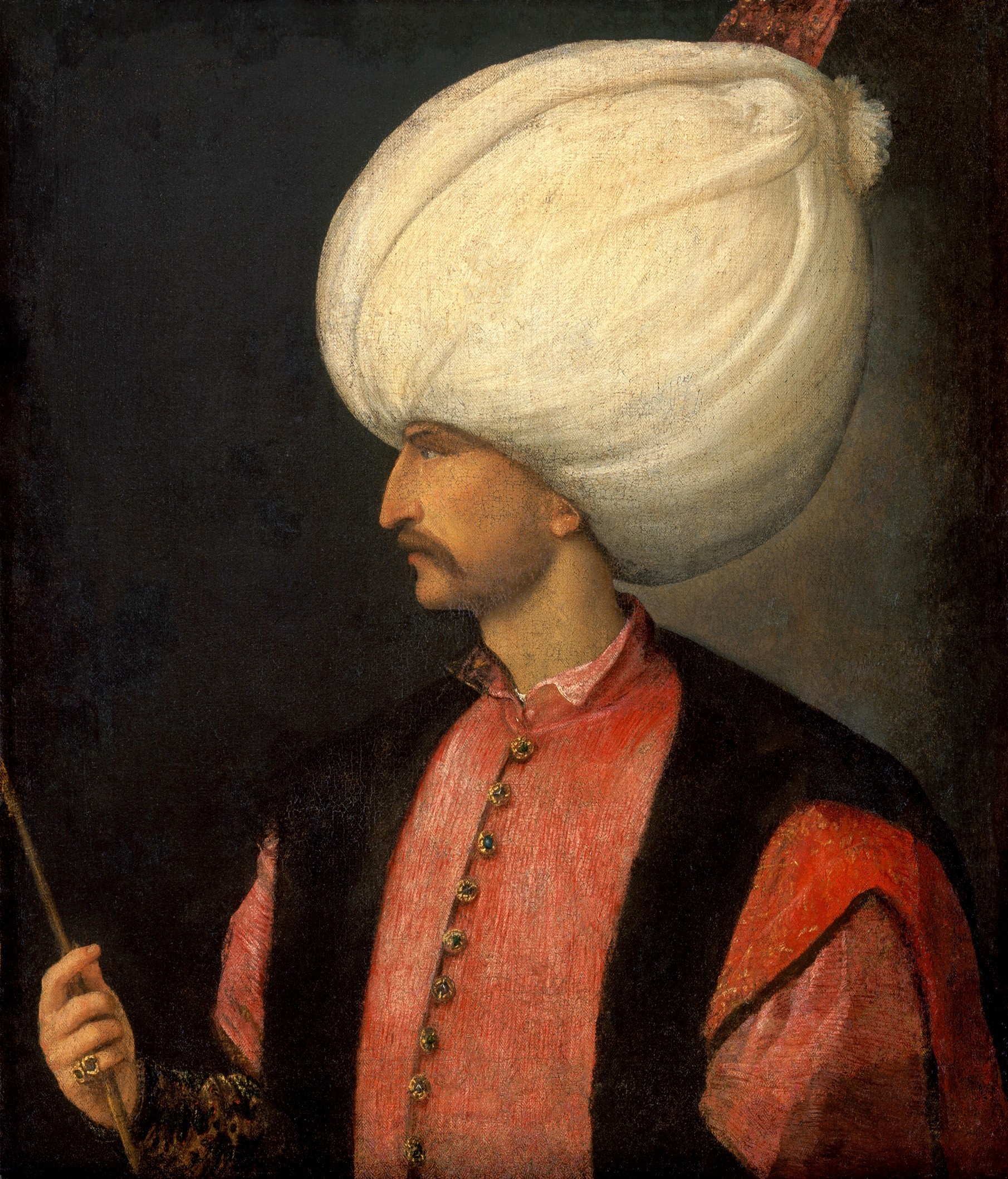
Suleiman the Magnificent had denounced the blood libel in the Ottoman Empire in the 16th century, but it became more common as Christian influence increased in the 1800s.

The blood libel against Jews originated in England in 1144 with the case of William of Norwich. The accusation that Jews used the blood of Christian children to prepare matzos for Passover became a staple of Christian antisemitism of the Middle Ages, with the total number of recorded ritual murder accusations reaching 150. With the strengthening of standards of evidence in legal cases, the number of charges began to decline, and few blood libel cases reached European courts after 1772. Nevertheless, some instances of ritual murder accusation arose as late as the 19th century.

In the Middle East, the blood libel was deeply ingrained in the consciousness of some local Christian communities by the early 20th century, while the blood libel likely came there in the early 19th century . Accusations of blood libel were entirely unknown in the Byzantine Empire, unlike in Western Europe where they were more common. After the Ottomans conquered the Byzantine lands, Greek communities were usually the source of ritual murder charges against Jews, often at times of social and economic tensions. The first appearance of the blood libel under Ottoman rule took place in the reign of Mehmet II. Subsequently, accusations of ritual murder were only sporadic and Ottoman authorities usually condemned them. In the 16th century, Sultan Suleiman the Magnificent issued a firman, formally denouncing blood libel charges against the Jews.

With the increase of Christian influence in the Ottoman Empire, the standing of the Jews declined. The sultan's Hatt-i Sharif of Gulhane, proclaimed in 1839, ushered in an era of liberal reforms known as Tanzimat. This period further enhanced the status of the Christians and eroded the power of authorities to protect the Jews. Before 1840, cases of blood libel occurred in Aleppo in 1810 and in Antioch in 1826.

In 1840, contemporaneous with the affair in Rhodes, a case of blood libel known as the Damascus affair was developing in Damascus, while the city was under the short-lived control of Muhammad Ali of Egypt. On February 5, Capuchin friar Thomas and his servant Ibrahim Amara went missing, and the Jews of Damascus were accused of murdering them to collect their blood for Passover matzos. The local Christian community, the governor, and the French consul, who received full support from Paris, actively pursued the ritual murder charge. The Jews were tortured, and some of them confessed to having killed Father Thomas and his servant. Their testimonies were used by the accusers as the irrefutable proof of guilt. The case drew international attention, arousing active protests from the European Jewish diaspora.

== Accusation ==
=== Disappearance ===
On February 17, 1840, a boy from a Greek Orthodox family in Rhodes went for a walk and did not return. The next day his mother reported the disappearance to the Ottoman authorities. The island's governor, Yusuf Pasha, ordered a search, but several days' efforts proved fruitless. The European consuls pressed the governor to solve the case: the boy's family was Christian, though without foreign protection. The Greek Christian population of Rhodes, meanwhile, had no doubts that the boy had been murdered by the Jews for ritual purposes. An eyewitness reported: "It was firmly believed that the child in question was doomed to be sacrificed by the Jews. The whole island was agitated from one end to the other." The assurance of the local Christians having been impressed upon the Ottoman authorities, they began searching the Jewish quarter, again in vain.

=== Arrests, interrogations, and torture ===
Several days later, two Greek women reported having seen the boy walking towards the city of Rhodes accompanied by four Jews. The women claimed that one of the Jews was Eliakim Stamboli, who was arrested, questioned, and subjected to five hundred blows of the bastinado. On February 23, he was interrogated again and tortured in the presence of many dignitaries, including the governor, the qadi (Muslim judge), the Greek archbishop, and European consuls. Jews of Rhodes reported that Stamboli was "loaded with chains, many stripes were inflicted upon him and red-hot wires were run through his nose, burning bones were applied to his head and a very heavy stone was laid upon his breast, insomuch as he was reduced to the point of death." Under torture, Stamboli confessed to the ritual murder charge and incriminated other Jews, opening the door to further arrests. Some half dozen Jews were accused of the crime and tortured, and the chief rabbi was intensely questioned as to whether Jews practice ritual murder.

=== Blockade ===
At the instigation of the Greek clergy and the European consuls, Governor Yusuf Pasha blockaded the Jewish quarter on the eve of Purim and arrested Jacob Israel the chief rabbi. The inhabitants could obtain neither food nor fresh water. The Jews thwarted a subversive attempt to smuggle a dead body into the Jewish quarter. The Ottoman authorities, on the whole, were keen to make life more difficult for the residents through the ritual murder accusation against the Jews. At the end of February, he initiated further hearings on the case, after which evidence was declared insufficient to convict the prisoners. The governor, on the other hand, refused to lift the blockade of the Jewish quarter. In early March he sent to Constantinople asking for instructions. Only after the blockade had lasted for twelve months was the governor forced to lift it by a high treasury official who visited the island on a tour of inspection. At that point, the Jews thought that the affair was over and "returned thanks to the Almighty for their deliverance".

=== Influence of the Damascus affair ===
The relief, however, was dashed in early March by news of the Damascus affair. Reports that the Jews of Damascus had confessed to having murdered Father Thomas reinforced the belief of the Christian community in the ritual murder charge. The British consul reported that "the Greeks cried loud that justice had not been rendered to them and that the rabbi and chiefs ought to have been imprisoned… In order to keep the populace quiet… it was decided that these should be arrested." Eight Jews were arrested, including the chief rabbi and David Mizrahi, who were tortured by being suspended swinging from hooks in the ceiling in the presence of the European consuls. Mizrahi lost consciousness after six hours, while the rabbi was kept there for two days until he suffered a hemorrhage. Nevertheless, neither confessed and they were released after a few days. The other six Jews remained in prison in early April.

=== Consular involvement ===
The European vice-consuls in Rhodes were united in believing the ritual murder charge. They played the key role in the interrogation, with J. G. Wilkinson, the British consul, and E. Masse from Sweden being involved. During the interrogation of the chief rabbi, Wilkinson asked, referring to the qadi's decision to dismiss the case: "What signifies the Mollah's judgment to us after what happened in Damascus and it is proved that, according to the Talmud, Christian blood must be used in making your Passover bread?" The consuls were also present during much of the torture. When the chief rabbi, an Austrian subject, was tortured, he appealed to Austrian vice-consul Anton Giuliani, who replied: "What rabbi? What do you complain about? So you are not dead yet."

Some Jewish inhabitants of Rhodes accused the consuls of a conspiracy to exploit the case to eliminate Elias Kalimati, a local Jew, who represented the business interests of Joel Davis, a Jewish businessman from London. Davis was rapidly increasing his share in the profitable sponge exports from the island, and he was a major business rival of the European consuls. Kalimati, however, was not among the persons held in the affair, calling that allegation into question. Other Jewish sources claimed that the "consuls stated openly… their purpose of exterminating the Jews of Rhodes or to compel them to change their religion."

== European diplomatic involvement ==
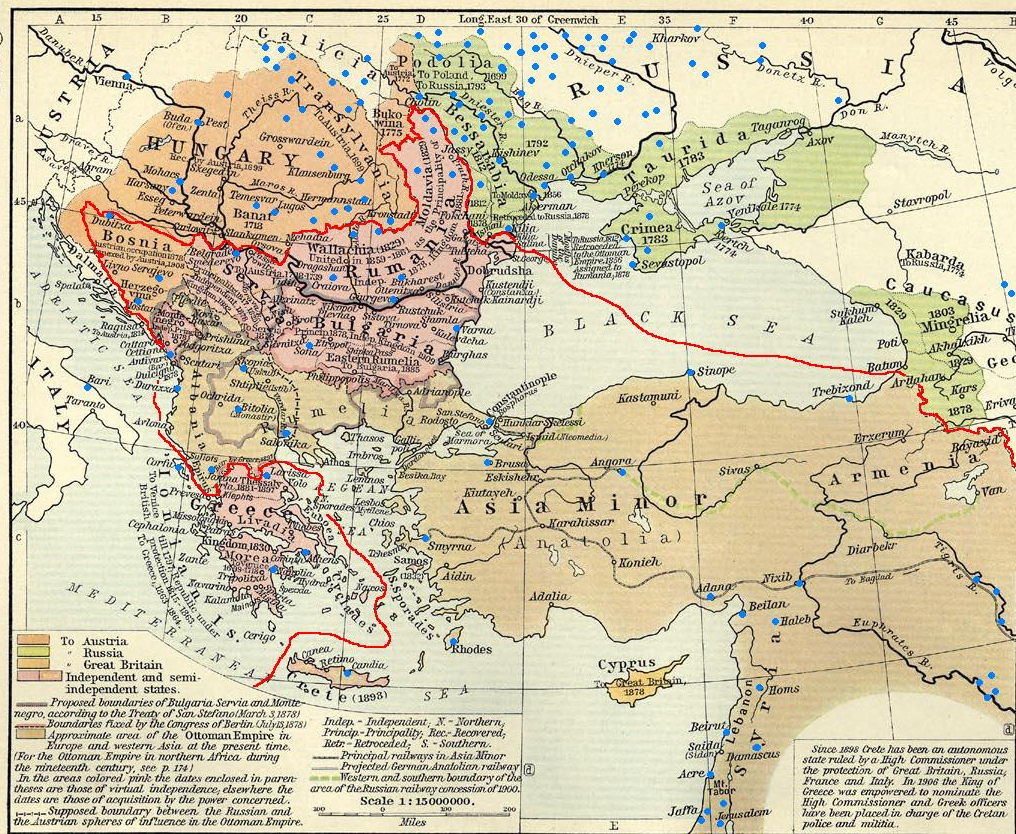
Map of southeastern Europe and the Levant, showing the extent of the Ottoman Empire in 1840 (red outline). Major Jewish communities are denoted in blue.

In the first days of the blockade, someone managed to smuggle a letter out of the Jewish quarter to the Jewish leadership in Constantinople. It was not until March 27 that the leaders of the Jewish community in the Ottoman capital forwarded it to the Rothschild family, together with a similar call for help from the Jews of Damascus. To these documents, the Jewish leaders attached their own statement in which they cast doubt on their ability to influence the sultan.

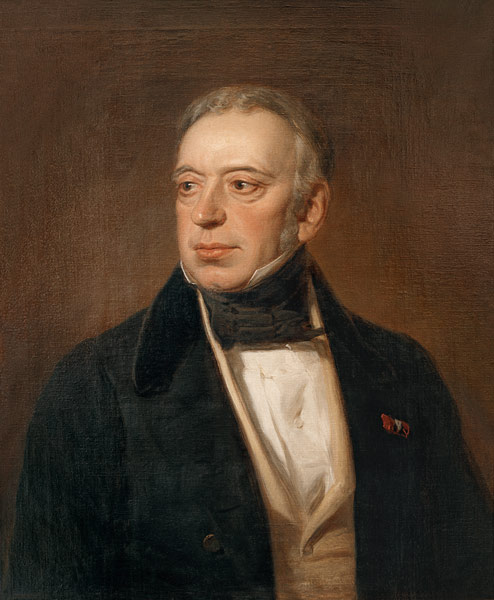
Salomon Mayer von Rothschild

The intervention of the Rothschilds bore the quickest fruit in Austria. The head of the Rothschild family bank in Vienna, Salomon Mayer von Rothschild, played the key role in raising financing for the Austrian Empire, and he had a very close relationship with the Austrian chancellor von Metternich. On April 10, Metternich dispatched instruction regarding both the Damascus and Rhodes affairs to Bartholomäus von Stürmer, ambassador in Constantinople, and Anton von Laurin, consul in Alexandria. In his dispatch, Metternich wrote: "The accusation that Christians are deliberately murdered for some blood-thirsty Passover festival is by its nature absurd…" Regarding the Rhodes case, the chancellor instructed von Stürmer "to tip the wink to the Turkish regime, so that they instruct pasha of Rhodes accordingly and that you let [our] vice-consul in Rhodes know that in such cases he should work in the spirit of sensible mediation." Von Stürmer, responded, "[T]here have been no persecutions against the Jewish population, at least not by the authorities."

In the UK, it took the Jewish community longer to react to the calls for help from Rhodes and Damascus. The Board of Deputies of the British Jews convened on April 21 to discuss the blood libels. They resolved to request the British, Austrian, and French governments to intercede with the Ottoman government and stop the persecutions. The resolution condemning the ritual murder charges was published as a paid advertisement in 35 British journals; it appeared twice in the most important newspapers. On April 30, a delegation elected by the Board met with the foreign secretary Lord Palmerston, who called the blood libel a "calumny" and promised that "the influence of the British government should be exerted to put a stop to [the] atrocities." In his dispatch of May 5, the foreign secretary told Lord Ponsonby, the British ambassador in Constantinople, to communicate the material on the Rhodes affair to the Ottoman government "officially and in writing" and to "request… an immediate and strict inquiry to be made… especially into the allegation that these atrocities were committed at the instigation of the Christians and the European consuls."

A consensus formed within the European diplomatic community in Constantinople that the persecution of the accused Jews had to be stopped. This opinion was held not only by Lord Ponsonby, but also by von Stürmer, whose correspondence revealed that he was not at all convinced of the innocence of the Jews; by the French ambassador Edouard Pontois, whose government stood by the French consuls who supported blood libels in Rhodes and Damascus; and by the Prussian ambassador Hans von Königsmark. Consequently, the way was open for Lord Ponsonby, by far the most powerful diplomat in Constantinople, to intervene unopposed on behalf the Jews of Rhodes.

== Investigation and trial ==
=== Intervention of the Ottoman government ===
In response to Yusuf Pasha's request, the Ottoman government sent its instructions to Rhodes, where they arrived at the end of April. The government would set up an official investigatory commission before which representatives of the Jewish and Greek communities were ordered to present their evidence. In mid-May, the government sent orders to release the six remaining Jewish prisoners. On May 21, they were ceremoniously called before the court (shura) and freed under the guarantees of the elders of the Jewish community.

The Christians responded to these actions of the central government with a fresh wave of fury against the Jews so that in late May violence was in the air. The Jews described many cases in which they were assaulted or beaten by the Greeks, and the sons of the British and the Greek consuls were among those who beat up a number of Jews. When the Jews complained to the governor, he ordered the complainants subjected to four to five hundred blows of the bastinado. The qadi disassociated himself from the actions of the governor, who declared that he had acted upon the demands of the consuls. On top of that, the governor ordered five other Jews arrested.

=== Acquittal ===
The Greek and Jewish delegations from Rhodes, each numbering five, arrived at Constantinople on May 10. In the capital they were joined by the qadi, the French consul, and the Austrian vice-consul. On May 26, the investigatory tribunal held its first open session chaired by Rifaat Bey. The qadi argued that "the entire affair is the product of hatred; [and] was instigated by the English and Austrian consuls alone." The consuls insisted on the guilt of the Jews, and they presented a concurring written testimony from their colleagues who stayed on Rhodes.

The case dragged on for two more months, as the British ambassador insisted on bringing to light the facts implicating the Rhodes governor of torture. Finally, on July 21 the verdict was announced. In its first part, the case between "the Greek population of Rhodes, the plaintiff, and the Jewish population, defendant", the result was acquittal. In its second part, Yusuf Pasha was dismissed from his post as governor of Rhodes because "he had permitted procedures to be employed against the Jews which are not authorized in any way by the law and which are expressly forbidden by the Hatt-i Sharif of 3 November". The British ambassador praised the investigation as one during which "[t]he affair of Rhodes was examined with fairness" and called the verdict "a signal proof of the justice and humanity with which the Sublime Porte acts."

=== Sultan's firman ===
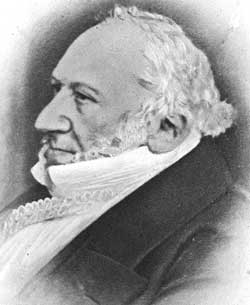
Moses Montefiore's audience with the Sultan led to the firman denouncing the blood libel.

In July 1840, a delegation headed by Adolphe Crémieux and Sir Moses Montefiore left for Egypt to save the Jews of Damascus. Crémieux and Montefiore requested Muhammad Ali to transfer the investigation to Alexandria or have the case considered by European judges. However, their request was denied. The delegation, concerned primarily with the release of the imprisoned Jews of Damascus, decided to accept their liberation without any judicial declaration of their innocence or formal denunciation of the blood libel. The liberation order was issued on August 28, 1840, and, as a compromise, it stated explicitly that it was an act of justice rather than a pardon granted by the ruler.

After completing his mission to Muhammad Ali, Montefiore was returning to Europe by way of Constantinople. On October 15, 1840, in the Ottoman capital he had a meeting with Lord Ponsonby, to whom Montefiore suggested that following the precedent set by Suleiman the Magnificent, the sultan should issue a decree (firman) formally denouncing the blood libel and effectively sealing the cases both in Rhodes and in Damascus. The British ambassador was enthusiastic about the idea, and within one week he arranged for Montefiore a meeting with Reshid Pasha. Montefiore prepared a draft text of the firman and had its French translation read to Reshid Pasha, who responded encouragingly.

Montefiore's audience with the sultan took place at the palace late in the evening on October 28. Montefiore described in his diary that as he and his party were driving to the palace, "[t]he streets were crowded; many of the Jews had illuminated their houses." During the audience, Montefiore read aloud a formal address in which he thanked the sultan for his stand in the Rhodes case. In turn, the sultan assured his guests that their request would be granted. The firman was delivered to Montefiore on November 7, and a copy was subsequently provided to the Hakham Bashi. Citing the judgment in the Rhodes case, the decree stated that a careful examination of Jewish beliefs and "religious books" had demonstrated that "the charges brought against them… are pure calumny. The Jewish nation shall possess the same privileges as are granted to the numerous other nations who submit to our authority. The Jewish nation shall be protected and defended."

The firman stаted that competent authorities had carried a thorough investigation of Jewish religious literature, and that the investigation found that Jews are forbidden from consuming animal blood, let alone human blood.
