= History of the Jews in Syria =

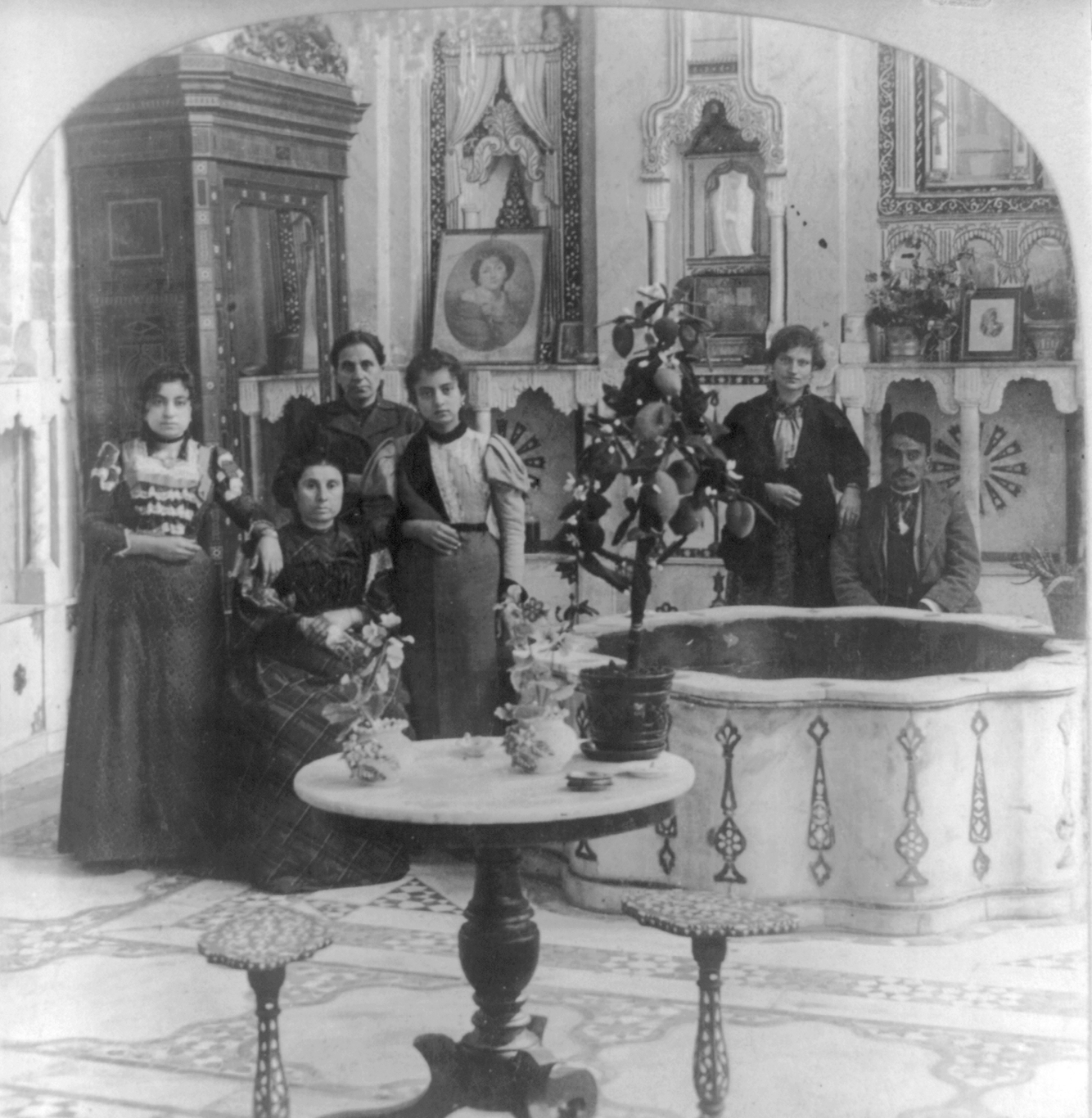
Jewish family in Damascus, 1901

Syrian Jews descend from Jews who inhabited the region of today's Syria since the time of Roman rule (known as Musta'arabi Jews or more generally as Mizrahi Jews); and from Sephardim, Jews from Spain and Portugal who fled to Syria after the Alhambra Decree forced the expulsion of the Jews from Spain in 1492.

There were large Jewish communities in Aleppo ("Halabi Jews" or "Aleppo Jews") and Damascus ("Shami Jews") for centuries, and a smaller community in Qamishli on the Turkish border. In the early 20th century, a large percentage of Syrian Jews emigrated to British Mandatory Palestine, the United States, and Latin America.

Following the Syrian Civil War, some of the remaining Jews of Syria left the country. In 2022, it was alleged that only four Jews remain in Damascus. As of April 4, 2025, there are approximately six remaining Jews in Damascus.

== Second Temple period ==
The tradition of the community ascribes its founding to the time of King David in c. 1000 BCE, whose general Joab occupied the area of Syria, described in the Bible as Aram Zoba: this name is taken by later tradition as referring to Aleppo. Modern scholarship locates Aram Zoba in Lebanon and the far south of Syria: the identification with Aleppo is not found in rabbinic literature prior to the 11th century. Whether or not Jewish settlement goes back to a time as early as King David, both Aleppo and Damascus certainly had Jewish communities during Late Antiquity.

In Roman times, about 10,000 Jews lived in Damascus, governed by an ethnarch.

Around 7 BCE, King Herod of Judaea relocated Zamaris, a Jew from Babylonia, and his 500 mounted archers to Bathyra in Batanea, giving them tax exemptions to defend the area from Trachonite brigands and protect Jewish pilgrims heading to Jerusalem.

Paul of Tarsus succeeded, after a first rebuff, in converting many of the Jews of Damascus to Christianity in 49 CE. This irritated the Jewish ethnarch to such a degree that he attempted to arrest Paul; the latter's friends only saved his life by lowering him in a basket out of a window built into the wall of the city.

In the 70s CE, Jewish historian Josephus noted that "the Jewish race, while dispersed in considerable numbers among native populations throughout the world, is especially numerous in Syria, because of its proximity." Many Jews were murdered by the pagan inhabitants upon the outbreak of the First Jewish–Roman War.

== Late Antiquity ==
Later, Damascus, as the coins show, obtained the title of metropolis, and under Alexander Severus, when the city was a Christian colony, it became the seat of a bishop, who enjoyed a rank next to that of the Patriarch of Antioch. In the 5th century, under the rule of the Byzantine Empire, being the Talmudic time, Jews were living at Damascus for the rabbi Rafram bar Pappa went to pray in the synagogue of Jobar.

An early Jewish community is likely to have existed in Aleppo during the 5th century, when a synagogue was constructed there. Also in the 5th century, Jerome reports the presence in Beroea (Aleppo) of a congregation of Nazarenes (Jewish Christians) using a Hebrew gospel similar to that of Matthew.

During the early 7th century, Jews in Damascus participated in revolts against Byzantine rule, including support for the rebellion in Tyre. Estimates suggest that on the eve of the Islamic conquest, the Jewish population of Damascus may have numbered between 6,000 and 8,000.

== After the Islamic conquest ==
=== Damascus ===
According to Arabic-language source, Caliph 'Umar ibn al-Khaṭṭāb negotiated a treaty with the Jews of Jerusalem at Jabiyah, near Damascus, reportedly at the urging of Syrian Jews, indicating a close connection between these communities.

The rule of the Umayyads brought a new period of splendor to the city, which now became the capital of that caliphate. This period ended with the rise of the Abbasids, and the city suffered during the following centuries from continuous wars. The Jewish community continued, and certainly existed in 970; "for," says a historian, "Joseph ben Abitur of Cordoba, having lost all hope of becoming the chief rabbi of that city, went to Palestine in that year, and settled at Damascus". Fortunately for the Jews, it resisted the siege of the Second Crusade in 1147. Some time afterward a large number of Palestinian Jews sought refuge in Damascus from the enormous taxes imposed upon them by the Crusaders, thus increasing the community in Damascus. Little information exists concerning the Jews in Damascus during the following centuries. A little information is given by travelers who visited the city. In 1128, Abraham ibn Ezra visited Damascus (though compare the note of Harkavy.) According to Edelmann, Judah ha-Levi composed his famous poem on Zion in this city; but Harkavy has shown that "ash-Sham" here designates Palestine and not Damascus. In 1267, Nahmanides visited Damascus and led a Jewish colony to Jerusalem.

Benjamin of Tudela visited Damascus in 1170, while it was in the hands of the Seljukian prince Nur ad-Din Zangi. He found there 3,000 Rabbanite Jews and 100 Karaites. Jewish studies flourished there much more than in Palestine; according to Bacher it is possible that during the 12th century the seat of the Palestinian academy was transferred to Damascus. The principal rabbis of the city were Rabbi Ezra ben Abraham and his brother Sar Shalom ben Abraham, president of the tribunal; Yussef ִHamsi, R. Matsliaִh, R. Meïr, Yussef ibn Piat, R. Heman, the parnas, and R. Tsadok, physician.

About the same time, Petaִhiah of Regensburg was there. He found "about 10,000 Jews, who have a prince. The head of their academy is Rabbi Ezra, who is full of the knowledge of the Law; for Rabbi Samuel, the head of the Academy of Babylon, ordained him". It was a Damascus rabbi, Judah ben Josiah, who, toward the end of the twelfth century, was "nagid" in Egypt. At a later period another nagid, David ben Joshua, also came from Damascus.

In 1210, a French Jew, Samuel ben Samson, visited the city. He speaks of the beautiful synagogue situated outside the city (Jobar) and said to have been constructed by Elisha.

Under Saladin the city again enjoyed considerable importance; but upon his death the disturbances began anew, until in 1516 the city fell into the hands of the Turks, since which time it has declined to the rank of a provincial town.

It seems probable that Yehuda Alharizi also visited Damascus during the first decade of the 13th century. At least he mentions the city in the celebrated 46th "Makamah."

Toward the end of the 13th century Jesse ben Hezekiah, a man full of energy, arose in Damascus. He was recognized by Sultan Qalawun of Egypt as prince and exilarch, and in 1289 and in June 1290, in conjunction with his 12 colleagues, he put the anti-Maimonists under the ban.

The letters of the rabbis of Damascus and of Acre have been collected in the "Minִhat Qena'ot " (a compilation made by Abba Mari, grandson of Don Astruc of Lunel). No information is available for the 14th century. Estori Farִhi (1313) contents himself with the mere mention of Damascene Jews journeying to Jerusalem. A manuscript of David Kimhi on Ezekiel was written by Nathan of Narbonne and collated with the original by R. ִHiyya in Damascus, Ab 18, 1375. The Jewish community of Damascus continued to exist under the sultans (Burjites and Mamelukes) of Egypt, who conquered Syria; for the Jewish refugees of Spain established themselves among their coreligionists in that city in 1492, constructing a synagogue which they called "Khata'ib." The anonymous author of the "Yiִhus ha-Abot" also speaks of the beauties of Damascus; and of the synagogue at Jobar, "half of which was constructed by Elisha, half by Eleazar ben Arach".

Elijah of Ferrara in 1438 had come to Jerusalem and had a certain jurisdiction in rabbinical matters over Damascus as well. He speaks of a great plague which devastated Egypt, Syria, and Jerusalem; but he does not say how much the Jews of Damascus suffered. Menaִhem ִHayyim of Volterra visited Damascus in 1481, and found 450 Jewish families, "all rich, honored, and merchants." The head of the community was a certain R. Joseph, a physician.

Obadiah of Bertinoro in 1488 speaks in one of his letters of the riches of the Jews in Damascus, of the beautiful houses and gardens. A few years later, in 1495, an anonymous traveler speaks in like eulogistic terms. He lived with a certain Moses Makran, and he relates that the Jews in Damascus dealt in dress-goods or engaged in some handicraft. They lent money to the Venetians at 24% interest.

=== Aleppo ===
The Jewish community in Aleppo was located in a northern quarter with two synagogues, both dating to the 5th or 6th century, with one renovated in the Middle Ages. A nearby site outside the northern gate, the "Sanctuary of Vows" (Mashhad al-Du'ā'), was a place of pilgrimage shared by Jews, Christians, and Muslims, associated with the cenotaph of an unspecified prophet.

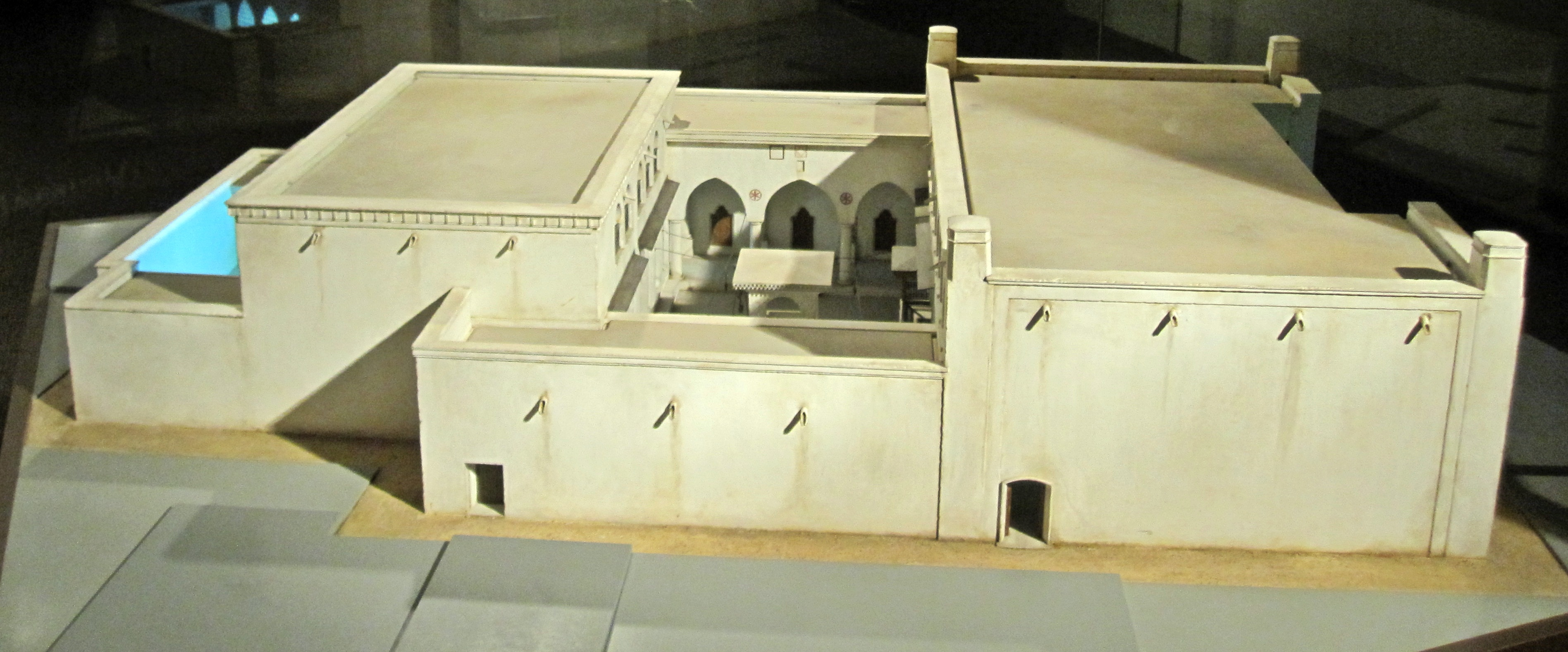
Model of the Central Synagogue of Aleppo in The Museum of the Jewish People at Beit Hatfutsot

Maimonides, in his letter to the rabbis of Lunel, speaks of Aleppo as being the only community in Syria where some Torah learning survived, though the effort devoted to it was in his opinion less than impressive.

Benjamin of Tudela visited Aleppo in 1173, where he found a Jewish community of 1,500 (or on another reading 5,000) souls with three noteworthy rabbis attending to their spiritual needs: Moses Alconstantini, Israel, and Seth. Petaִhiah of Regensburg was there between 1170 and 1180, and Alִharizi fifty years later. The former calls the citadel the palace of King Nour-ed-din, and says that there were 1,500 Jews in Aleppo, of whom the chief men were Rabbis Moses Alconstantini, Israel, and Seth. Yehuda Alharizi, author of the Taִhkemoni has much to say in praise of the Aleppo Jews. In 1195 the leading Jew was Joseph ben Judah, who had migrated from the Maghreb by way of Egypt, where he was the friend of Maimonides, who wrote for him the Guide for the Perplexed. Other men of learning were Azariah and his brother Samuel Nissim, the king's physician Eleazer, Jeshua, Jachin Hananiah, and Joseph ben ִHisdai. Although he respected them far more than their Damascene counterparts, Alharizi thought little of the Aleppo poets, of whom he mentions Moses Daniel and a certain Joseph; the best was Joseph ben Tsemah, who had good qualities but wrote bad verse. Their piety must have been extreme, for Eleazer is held up to scorn for having traveled on the Sabbath, although at the sultan's command. Alharizi died in Aleppo and was buried there.

In 1260 the Mongols conquered Aleppo, and massacred many of the inhabitants, but many of the Jews took refuge in the synagogue and were saved. In 1401 the Jewish quarter was pillaged, with the rest of the city, by Tamerlane; and a Jewish saint died there after a fast of seven months.

=== Homs ===
Jews reportedly participated in the defense of Homs against a Byzantine reconquest.

=== Daraa ===
In the 7th century, Daraa (then Adhri'at) was home to a significant rabbinic Jewish community. According to two Muslim sources (whose reliability is uncertain and which are not corroborated by any Jewish account), the Jewish tribes of Banu Qaynuqa and Banu Nadir settled in Daraa after being expelled from Medina by Muhammad.

== Early Modern period ==
=== Arrival of Spanish Jews in Syria ===
After the expulsion of the Jews from Spain in 1492, Sephardi Jews settled in many of the Islamic countries bordering the Mediterranean, including Syria, which then formed part of the Mameluke sultanate of Egypt. For the most part they founded their own communities, but they often assumed positions of rabbinic and communal leadership in their new homes. A social distinction remained between the newly arrived Sephardim and the native communities, the Musta'arabi Jews, which took several decades to accept them. Aleppo Jews of Spanish descent have a special custom, not found elsewhere, of lighting an extra candle at Hanukkah: it is said that this custom was established in gratitude for their acceptance by the local community. In both Aleppo and Damascus, the two communities supported a common Chief Rabbinate. Chief Rabbis were usually but not always from Spanish-descended families: in Aleppo there were five in a row from the Laniado family.

The Sephardic presence was greater in Aleppo than in Damascus which maintained closer ties to the Holy Land. In particular, the Damascus community was strongly influenced by the Safed Kabbalistic school of Isaac Luria, and contributed several notable personalities, including ִHayim Vital and Israel Najara. This explains certain differences in customs between the two cities.

Captain Domingo de Toral, who visited Aleppo in 1634, mentions over 800 houses of Jews who spoke Castilian. An anonymous Jewish traveler who arrived a few years after the Spanish immigration, found at Damascus 500 Jewish households; also a Karaite community whose members called themselves "Muallim-Tsadaqah"; and a more important Rabbanite community, composed of three groups and possessing three beautiful synagogues. One of these belonged to the Sephardim; another, to the Moriscos (Moorish Jews) or natives; and the third, to the Sicilians. In each synagogue there was a preacher, who read the works of Maimonides to the pious every day after the prayer. The preacher of the Sephardim was Isִhaq Mas'ud, that of the natives Shem-ִTob al-Furani, and that of the Sicilians Isaac ִHaber. There were also two small schools for young students of the Talmud, containing respectively thirty and forty pupils.

Sixty Jewish families were living in the village of Jobar, 1.6 kilometres (0.99 mi) from Damascus, who had a very beautiful synagogue. "I have never seen anything like it," says the author; "it is supported by thirteen columns. Tradition says that it dates from the time of the prophet Elisha, and that he here anointed King Hazael. R. Eleazar ben Arach (a tannaite of the 1st century) repaired this synagogue." In order to indicate, finally, that the city was even then under the Ottoman rule, the narrator adds that the people of Damascus had just received a governor ("na'ib") from Constantinople.

=== Under the Ottoman Empire ===
In 1515 Selim I defeated the Mamelukes and Syria became part of the Ottoman Empire.

The "Chronicle" of Joseph Sambari (finished 1672) contains the names of a number of rabbis of note who lived in Damascus during the 16th century. He says that the Jewish community lived chiefly in Jobar, and he knows of the synagogue of Elisha (Central Synagogue of Aleppo) and the cave of Elijah the Tishbite. At the head of the community was a certain Abu ִHatseirah (so-called from a peculiar kind of headdress which he wore), who was followed by 'Abd Allah ibn Naִsir. Of the rabbis of Damascus proper he mentions Joseph ִHayyaִt; Samuel Aripol, author of "Mizmor le-Todah"; Samuel ibn 'Imran; Joseph al-ִSa'iִh; Moses Najara, author of "Lekaִh ִTob"; ִHayim Alshaich; Joseph Maִtalon; Abraham Galante. In this home of learning there was also a model-codex of the Bible called "Al-Taj" (the Crown). In 1547 Pierre Belon visited Damascus in the train of the French ambassador M. de Fumel. He speaks of the large number of Jews there; but makes the singular confusion of placing in this city the events connected with the famous Ahmad Shaitan of Egypt.

Among the spiritual leaders of Damascus in the 16th century may be mentioned: Jacob Berab, who, in the interval between his sojourns in Egypt and at Safed, lived there for some years (c. 1534); ִHayim Vital the Calabrian (1526–1603), for many years chief rabbi of Damascus, and the author of various cabalistic works, including "Etz ִHayim"; Samuel ben David the Karaite (not "Jemsel," as Eliakim Carmoly has it), who visited Damascus in 1641, mentions the circumstance that the Karaites there do not read the Haftarah after the Pentateuch section. Moses Najara; his son, the poet Israel Najara; Moses Galante (died in 1608), the son of Mordecai Galante; and Samuel Laniado ben Abraham of Aleppo were also among the prominent men of the 16th century.

The most celebrated rabbis of the 17th century were Josiah Pinto, a pupil of Jacob Abulafia, and author of the "Kesef-Nibִhar", and his son-in-law, Samuel Vital, who transcribed and circulated a large number of his father's Kabbalistic manuscripts. At the same time in Aleppo ִHayyim Cohen ben Abraham wrote "Meqor ִHayyim", published at Constantinople in 1649, and at Amsterdam by Menasseh ben Israel in 1650. Other Aleppo worthies are Samuel Dwek and Isaac Lopes in 1690 followed by Yehudah Kassin, Isaac Berachah and Isaac Atieh in the 18th century.

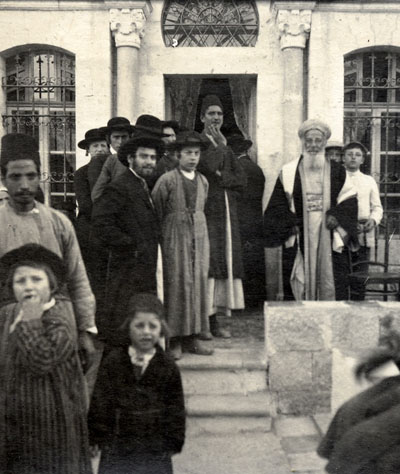
Aleppo Syria Jewish wedding in 1904

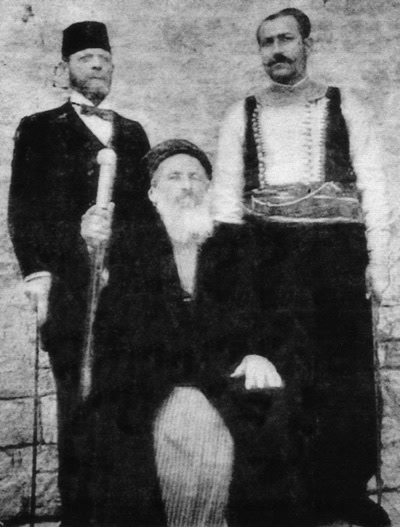
Chief Rabbi Jacob Saul Dweck, Av Beit Din of Aleppo, Syria, 1908.

From the 17th to the 19th century, several Jews of Spanish and Italian origin settled in Syria for trading reasons. Whenever possible, they kept their European nationality in order to be under the jurisdiction of the consular courts under the Ottoman capitulations, rather than being treated as dhimmis under Islamic law. These European Jews were known as Señores Francos (Frank Lords) and maintained a sense of social superiority to the native Jews, both Musta'arabi and Sephardi. They did not form separate synagogues, but often held services of their own in private houses. There were also Jews of Baghdadi origin who claimed British nationality through family connections in India.

Some information is obtainable from travellers who visited Damascus during the 19th century. Alfred von Kremer, in "Mittel-Syrien und Damaskus" (1853), states that in the municipal government of the city two Christians and one Jew had places; the number of Jews was 4,000, only 1,000 of whom, however, paid the poll-tax; the last Karaite had died there some fifty years previously, the Karaite synagogue being then sold to the Greeks, who turned it into a church. The traveller Benjamin II gives the same number of inhabitants. He describes the synagogue at Jobar (to the north-east of the city) thus:

"The structure of this ancient building reminds one of the Mosque Moawiah; the interior is supported by 13 marble pillars, six on the right and seven on the left side, and is everywhere inlaid with marble. There is only one portal by which to enter. Under the holy shrine . . . is a grotto . . . the descent to which is by a flight of about 20 steps. According to the Jews, the Prophet Elisha is said to have found in this grotto a place of refuge. . . . At the entrance of the synagogue, toward the middle of the wall to the right, is an irregularly formed stone, on which can be observed the traces of several steps. Tradition asserts that upon this step sat King Hazael when the Prophet Elisha anointed him king."

Benjamin II also speaks of valuable copies of parts of the Bible to be found in Damascus; though the dates he gives (581 and 989) are unreliable. Neubauer mentions a copy of the Bible which belonged to Elisha ben Abraham ben Benvenisti, called "Crescas," and which was finished in 1382.

Damascus had eight chief rabbis during the 19th century, namely: (1) Joseph David Abulafia (1809–16). (2) Jacob Antebi (1816–1833). (3) Jacob Perez (1833–48). (4) Aaron Bagdadi (1848–66). (During the next two years the office of chief rabbi was vacant, owing to internal quarrels.) (5) ִHayim Qimִhi of Constantinople (1868–72). (6) Mercado Kilִhi of Nish (1872–76). (7) Isaac ben Moses Abulafia (1876–88). (8) Solomon Eliezer Alfandari, commonly called "Mercado Alfandari" of Constantinople, who was appointed by an imperial decree in 1888 (still in office in 1901). A more recent chief rabbi was Nissim Indibo, who died at the end of 1972. Other Damascus Rabbis are Mordechai Maslaton, Shaul Menaged and Zaki Assa.

During the 19th, century the Jews of Damascus were several times made the victims of calumnies, the gravest being those of 1840 and 1860, in the reign of the sultan Abdülmecit I. That of 1840, commonly known as the Damascus affair, was an accusation of ritual murder brought against the Jews in connection with the death of Father Thomas. The libel resulted in the arrest and torture of senior members of the Jewish community, as well as the kidnapping of 63 children ages three to ten in an attempt to coerce a confession from their parents. The second accusation brought against the Jews, in 1860, was that of having taken part in the massacre of the Christians by the Druze and the Muslims. Five hundred Muslims, who had been involved in the affair, were hanged by the grand vizier Fuad Pasha. Two hundred Jews were awaiting the same fate, in spite of their innocence, and the whole Jewish community had been fined 4,000,000 piastres. The condemned Jews were saved only by the official intervention of Fuad Pasha himself; that of the Prussian consul, Dr. Johann G. Wetzstein; of Sir Moses Montefiore of London, and of the bankers Abraham Salomon Camondo of Constantinople and Shemaya Angel of Damascus. From that time to the end of the 19th century, several further blood accusations were brought against the Jews; these, however, never provoked any great excitement.

Prominent Aleppo rabbis include Eliahu Shamah, Abraham Antebi and Mordechai Labaton in the 19th century, Jacob Saul Dwek who died in 1919, followed by Ezra Hamwi and Moses Mizrahi who was prepared to be burnt with the Torah Scrolls but was removed by the Arab mob from the Jamilieh Synagogue during the pogrom of 1947. He was followed by Moses Tawil, Shlomo Zafrani and Yomtob Yedid.

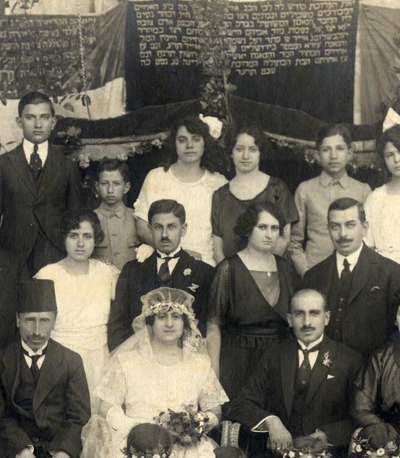
Jewish wedding in Aleppo, Syria, 1914.

In the 19th century, the commercial importance of Aleppo and Damascus underwent a marked decline. Beginning around 1850, and with increasing frequency until the First World War, many families left Syria for Egypt, and later moved from there to Manchester in England, often following the cotton trade. Later still a considerable number left Manchester for Latin America, in particular Mexico and Argentina.

Jews continued to emigrate from Syria into the early 20th century. From around 1908, many Syrian Jews migrated to New York City, where the Brooklyn community is now the world's largest single Syrian Jewish community.

== French Mandate and independence era ==
With anti-Jewish feeling reaching a climax in the late 1930s and early 1940s, many Jews considered emigrating. Between 1942 and 1947, around 4,500 Jews arrived in Palestine from Syria and Lebanon. From 1945 to 1948, about 1,300 Syrian Jewish children were smuggled into Palestine.

On 17 April 1946, Syria became independent from France. After independence, the Syrian government banned Jewish emigration to Palestine, and those caught trying to leave faced the death penalty or imprisonment with hard labor. Severe restrictions were also placed on the teaching of Hebrew in Jewish schools.

In 1947, there were 15,000 Jews in Syria. On November 29, 1947, the United Nations approved a Partition Plan for Palestine, which included an independent Jewish state. Pogroms subsequently broke out in Damascus and Aleppo. The December 1947 pogrom in Aleppo in particular left the community devastated; 75 Jews were killed, hundreds were injured, and more than 200 Jewish homes, shops, and synagogues were destroyed.

Thousands of Syrian Jews illegally escaped to Palestine following these attacks.

In August 1949, the Menarsha synagogue grenade attack in Damascus killed 12 Jews, and injured dozens.

== Post-1948 ==
At the end of November 1947, the United Nations voted to partition British-ruled Mandatory Palestine into separate Jewish and Arab states. The leadership of Arab Palestine rejected the partition plan; Israel alone declared independence in May, 1948.

As a member of the Arab League, Syria was part of the coalition which invaded to "save Palestine as an independent Arab unified state."

The partition vote triggered a wave of attacks on Jews across the Arab world, dramatically accelerating the exodus of Jews.

In Syria, the government organized Aleppo's Arab inhabitants to attack the Jewish population. The Aleppo Arab riot of 1947 killed 75 Jews, injured many hundreds more, and set several Jewish shops, five schools, 10 synagogues, 150 homes, an orphanage and a youth club ablaze, destroying them.

This marked the beginning of mass Jewish emigration from Syria to Israel, despite the Syrian government's willingness to put to death those who attempted to flee. Other repressive measures against Jews included barring them from government service, not allowing them to own telephones or driver's licenses, and forbidding them to buy property.

The anti-Semitic attitude of Syria's government was displayed to the world when it provided shelter for Nazi war criminal Alois Brunner, an aide to Adolf Eichmann. Initially, Lebanon allowed Syrian Jews escaping to Israel free passage through its territory. This ended when the Syrian government began confiscating the passports of Jews, and Lebanon announced that it could not allow persons through its borders without travel documents.

Between 1948 and 1961, about 5,000 Syrian Jews managed to reach Israel. Many Syrian Jews also immigrated to Lebanon, but a few were deported back to Syria upon the Syrian government's request. The Syrian Jews in Lebanon, along with the rest of the Lebanese Jewish community, would largely leave that country for Israel, Europe, and the Americas in later years.

The Syrian government passed a number of restrictive laws against the Jewish minority. In 1948, the government banned the sale of Jewish property. In 1953, all Jewish bank accounts were frozen. Jewish property was confiscated, and Jewish homes which had been taken from their owners were used to house Palestinian refugees.

In 1954, the Syrian government temporarily lifted the ban on Jewish emigration; Jews who left had to leave all their property to the government. After the first group of Jewish emigrants left for Turkey in November 1954, emigration was swiftly banned again.

In 1958, when Syria joined the United Arab Republic, Jewish emigration was temporarily permitted again, again on condition that those leaving relinquish all their property, but it was soon prohibited again. In 1959, people accused of helping Jews escape Syria were brought to trial.

Following the 1963 Syrian coup d'état in which the Assad regime assumed power, a new decree in March 1964 banned Jews from traveling more than 5 kilometres (3 mi) from their hometowns. Jews were not allowed to work for the government or banks, could not acquire drivers' licenses, and were banned from purchasing property. Jews could not choose to have their heirs inherit their property, with the government confiscating the property of all Jews upon their deaths.

Although Jews were prohibited from leaving the country, they were sometimes allowed to travel abroad for commercial or medical reasons. Any Jew granted clearance to leave the country had to leave behind a bond of $300–$1,000 and family members to be used as hostages to ensure they returned. An airport road was paved over the Jewish cemetery in Damascus, and Jewish schools were closed and handed over to Muslims.

The Jewish Quarter of Damascus was under constant surveillance by the secret police, who were present at synagogue services, weddings, bar mitzvahs, and other Jewish gatherings. The secret police closely monitored contact between Syrian Jews and foreigners and kept a file on every member of the Jewish community. Jews also had their phones tapped and their mail read by the secret police.

After Israel's victory in the 1967 Six-Day War, restrictions were further tightened, and 57 Jews in Qamishli were allegedly killed in a pogrom. The Jewish communities in Damascus, Aleppo, and Qamishli were under house arrest for eight months following the war. Many Jewish workers were laid off following the Six-Day War.

As a result, Syrian Jews began escaping clandestinely, and supporters abroad helped smuggle Jews out of Syria. Syrian Jews already living abroad often bribed officials to help Jews escape. Judy Feld Carr, a Canadian-Jewish activist, helped smuggle 3,228 Jews out of Syria to Israel, the United States, Canada, and Latin America. Carr recalled that Syrian-Jewish parents were "desperate" to get their children out of the country. Those who were caught attempting to escape faced execution or forced labor. If an escape was successful, family members could be imprisoned and stripped of their property. Often with the help of smugglers, escapees attempted to sneak across the border into Lebanon or Turkey, where they were met and assisted by undercover Israeli agents or local Jewish communities.

Most escapees were young and single men. Many single men decided to put off marriage until they escaped, as they wanted to raise their children in freedom. As a result, the ratio of single men and women became heavily imbalanced, and Syrian Jewish women were often unable to find husbands.

In 1970, the Israeli government began receiving intelligence of the situation Jews faced in Syria, and the efforts of many Jewish youths to flee in spite of the danger. That year, Israel launched Operation Blanket, a series of individual attempts to bring Jews to Israel, during which Israeli naval commandos and Mossad operatives made dozens of incursions into Syria. The operation only succeeded in bringing a few dozen young Jews to Israel.

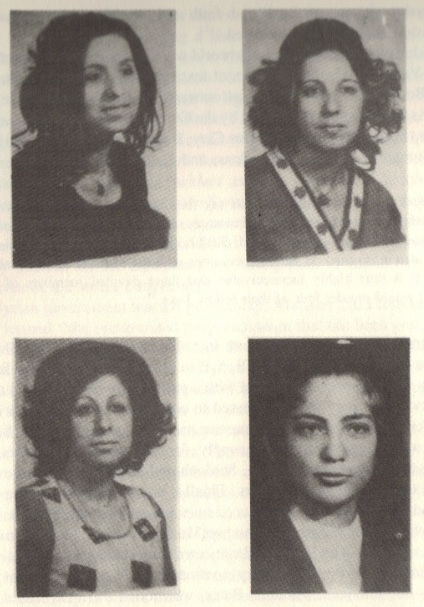
The Zeibak sisters: Four Syrian-Jewish girls (three sisters and their cousin) who were raped, killed, and mutilated while trying to flee to Israel in 1974

In 1973 Zaki Katzav, a Zionist activist, who was murdered at the entrance to his home, was recognized by the State of Israel as a martyr.

On 14 April 1974, four Jewish girls were raped, murdered and mutilated after attempting to flee to Israel. Their bodies were discovered by border police in a cave in the Zabdani Mountains northwest of Damascus along with the remains of two Jewish boys, Natan Shaya, 18 and Kassem Abadi 20, victims of an earlier massacre. Syrian authorities deposited the bodies of all six in sacks before the homes of their parents in the Jewish quarter of Damascus.

In 1975, President Hafez al-Assad explained why he refused to allow Jewish emigration: "I cannot let them go, because if I let them go how can I stop the Soviet Union sending its Jews to Israel, where they will strengthen my enemy?"

In 1977, Syrian President Hafez al-Assad, as a gesture to US President Jimmy Carter, began allowing limited numbers of young women to leave the country, and some 300 left in total under this program.

During a 10-year period in the 1980s, a collection of Jewish holy objects was smuggled out of Syria through the efforts of Chief Rabbi Avraham Hamra. The collection included nine bible manuscripts, each between 700 and 900 years old, 40 Torah scrolls, and 32 decorative boxes where the Torahs were held. The items were taken to Israel and placed in the Jewish National and University Library of the Hebrew University of Jerusalem.

As a result of mainly clandestine emigration, the Syrian Jewish population declined. In 1957, there were only 5,300 Jews left in Syria, out of an original population of 15,000 in 1947. In 1968, it was estimated that there were 4,000 Jews still in Syria. In January 1984, a pregnant Jewish woman and her two young children were murdered in Aleppo

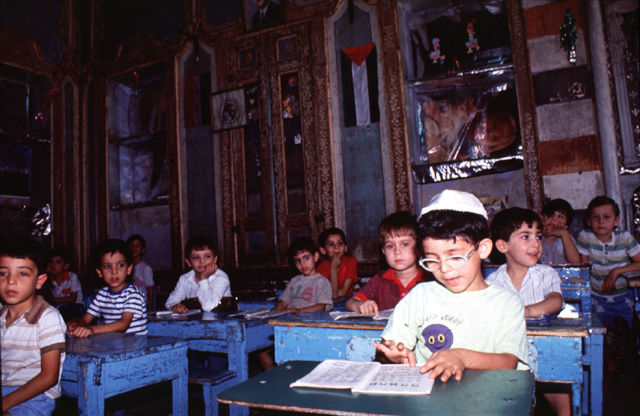
Pupils at the Maimonides school in Damascus. This photograph was taken shortly before the exodus of the remaining Syrian Jews in 1992

In November 1989, the Syrian government agreed to facilitate the emigration of 500 single Jewish women, who greatly outnumbered eligible Jewish men. During the 1991 Madrid peace conference, the United States pressured Syria to ease restriction on its Jewish population following heavy lobbying from Americans of Syrian-Jewish descent. As a result, Syria lifted many restrictions on its Jewish community, and allowed Jews to leave on condition that they not immigrate to Israel.

Beginning on the Passover Holiday of 1992, 4,000 remaining members of the Damascus Jewish community (Arabic Yehud ash-Sham) as well as the Aleppo community and the Jews of Qamishli, were granted exit permits. Within a few months, thousands of Syrian Jews left for the United States, France or Turkey with the help of philanthropic leaders of the Syrian Jewish community. Some 300 remained in Syria, most of them elderly.

Of the Syrian Jews who left for the United States, 1,262 were brought to Israel in a two-year covert operation. Most of them settled in Tel Aviv, Holon, and Bat Yam. More than 2,400 others stayed in the U.S. and settled in New York. Israel initially kept the news of their emigration censored, fearing that it would imperil the rights of the remaining Syrian Jews to leave if they wished. After concluding that the Jews remaining wanted to stay and would not leave, Israeli authorities cleared the story for publication. In 1994, former Syrian Chief Rabbi Avraham Hamra immigrated to Israel from New York together with his mother, wife, and six children.

The Jews who stayed in the United States initially faced many difficulties. To save face, President Hafez al-Assad had demanded that the departures not be called emigration: that the United States officially admit them as tourists, and that Syrian Jews purchase round-trip tickets to the United States. As a result, the United States granted them political asylum and temporary non-immigrant visas, rather than admitting them as refugees with a view to full citizenship. Therefore, they were unable to obtain U.S. citizenship or permanent residency, and thus could not leave the country, work in their chosen professions, obtain licenses, or apply for public assistance. In 2000, a bill was proposed in Congress that granted them citizenship.

=== 21st century ===
==== Civil war ====
With the start of the 21st century, there was only a small, largely elderly community left in Syria. Jews were still officially banned from politics and government employment and did not have military service obligations. Jews were also the only minority to have their religion mentioned on their passports and identification cards. Though they were occasionally subjected to violence by Palestinian protesters, the Syrian government took measures to protect them. There was a Jewish primary school for religious studies, and Hebrew was allowed to be taught in some schools. Every two or three months, a rabbi from Istanbul visited the community to oversee the preparation of kosher meat, which residents froze and used until his next visit.

The community gradually shrank. From 2000 to 2010, 41 Syrian Jews made aliyah to Israel. In 2005, the U.S. State Department estimated the Jewish population at 80 in its annual International Religious Freedom Report. In 2013, the BBC revealed that the largest Jewish cemetery in Syria in Damascus had been demolished in favor of an ISIS regional headquarters while desecrating the dignity of the dead.

As of December 2014, with the Syrian civil war underway, fewer than 50 Jews were thought to remain in Syria.

In October 2015, with the threat of ISIS nearby, nearly all of the remaining Jews in Aleppo were rescued in a covert operation and moved to Israel, where they were resettled in Ashkelon. In August 2019, BBC Arabic visited some of the last remaining Jews living in Damascus. In April 2020 there were only a handful of elderly Jews remaining in the country, all in Damascus. Estimates of their number varied. In 2022 and 2024, it was reported that only four Jews remained, including two elderly Jewish women in the town of Qamishli. Another report put the figure at 3 in 2024. Another report stated that there were 20-30 Jews still in Syria.

==== Transitional period ====
On December 17, 2024, following the fall of the Assad regime and a transitional government taking power, the Times of Israel reported that Jewish relics from the Jobar Synagogue would be returned to Syria. A representative of the new transitional government met the head of the Jewish community, Bakhour Chamntoub, and stated that the Jews would be protected and Syrian Jews abroad would be allowed to return. It was also announced that a delegation of Syrian Jewish business leaders from abroad would visit the country in a tour led by Israeli-American philanthropist Mordechai Kahana, with the intention of restoring the Jobar Synagogue. At the time, it was reported that the Jewish community numbered 9 people in total.

On January 12, 2025, it was announced that with the passing of Hadiya Shatakh at age 92, the Jewish community in Syria now numbered 8 persons. On January 5, 2025, Syrian Jewish Chief Rabbi Binyamin Hamra, has written to the head of Syria's new government Ahmed al-Sharaa to congratulate him on his victory over the toppled regime of Bashar al-Assad, and stress the importance of preserving Syria's historic Jewish community. In a January 16, 2025 interview, Bishor Simantov, one of the last remaining Jews in Damascus, stated that he believes that conditions in Syria have improved since the overthrow of Bashar al-Assad. As of February 22, 2025 the total of living Jews in Syria numbered 7. On March 9, 2025, Syrian Jews from the US asked the White House to lift sanctions so they can rebuild Damascus. A 2024 study revealed that stolen Syrian Jewish assets valued at $200,167,458 in 1947 would equate to $10,692,545,656 in current dollars.

In December 2025, Hind Kabawat registered the Jewish Heritage in Syria Foundation (JHS), making it the first Jewish organization ever registered in Syria. The organisation plans to return properties confiscated under previous governments and restore Jewish holy sites.

On 25 December 2025, Syrian Jews in America bought two residential towers under construction in Jerusalem; this is believed to be one of the largest private real estate transactions in Israel's history.

In April 2026, Syrian authorities arrested a five-member cell allegedly linked to Hezbollah and a plot to assassinate Rabbi Mikhail Houri in Damascus. According to the Ministry of Interior, one of the arrested individuals, a woman, tried to place an improvised explosive device outside the Rabbi's house. The device was disarmed and no injuries or damage were reported.

== List of Chief Rabbis of Syria ==
=== Damascus ===
- H Yaaqob Antebi (1809–1842)
- H Hayim Mimon Toubi (1842–1849)
- H Hayim Romano (1849–1851)
- H Yaaqob Peress (1852–1874)
- H Hayim YissHaq Qimhi (1874–1878)
- H Efraim Marqado-Alqali (1879–1883)
- H YissHaq Abulafia (1883–1894 & 1908–1909)
- H Shelomo Eliezer Ilfandari (1894–1908)
- H Yaaqob Danon (1910–1924)
- H Shelomo Moshe Tajir (1924–1935)
- H Yosef Dana (1935–1945)
- H Ezor Maslaton (1945–1963)
- H Nissim Indibo (1963–1973)
- H Abraham Hamra (1976–1994)
- H Binyamin Hamra (son of Abraham Hamra) (1994–present)

=== Aleppo ===
- H Efraim Laniado (1787–1805)
- H Abraham Sitehon (1805–1817)
- H Abraham Antebi (1817–1858)
- H Haim Mordekhai Labaton (1858–1869)
- H Shaul Dwek HaCohen (1869–1874)
- H Menashe Sitehon (1874–1876)
- H Aharon Chuoeka (1876–1880)
- H Moshe HaCohen (1880–1882)
- H Abraham Ezra Dwek HaCohen Kalussi (1883–1894)
- H Shelomo Safdieh (1895–1904)
- H Yaaqob Shaul Dwek HaCohen (1904–1908)
- H Hezqiah Shabtai (1908–1921 & 1924–1926)
- H Shabtai Bahbout (1921–1924)
- H Ezra Hamaoui (1926–1943) (was the Av Beit Din)
- H Moshe Mizrachi (1943–1967) (was the Av Beit Din)
- H Ezra Abadi Shayo (1967–1996) (was the Av Beit Din)
- H Yom Tob Yedid Halevi (1996–2016)

== See also ==
- Aleppo Codex
- Baqashot
- Central Synagogue of Aleppo
- History of the Jews in Muslim lands
- History of the Jews in Turkey
- Jewish exodus from Arab and Muslim lands
- Jewish Quarter of Damascus
- Mizrahi Jews
- Musta'arabi Jews
- Pizmonim
- Sephardi Jews
- Syrian Jews
