= Jobar Synagogue =

Former synagogue in Damascus, Syria

- Location of the destroyed synagogue in Damascus

Religion
- Affiliation: Judaism (former)
- Ecclesiastical or organisational status: Synagogue (720 BCE–2014)
- Status: Destroyed; Under restoration

Location
- Location: Jobar, Damascus
- Country: Syria
- Coordinates: 33°31′33.6″N 36°20′06.3″E

Architecture
- Established: 720 b.c.e
- Destroyed: May 2014 (during the Syrian civil war)

Specifications
- Length: 17.3 m (57 ft) (maximum)
- Width: 12.13 m (39.8 ft)

The Jobar Synagogue, also Eliyahu Hanavi Synagogue, was an ancient synagogue complex in the village of Jobar, now part of the metropolitan area of Damascus, Syria. It was severely damaged during the Syrian civil war in May 2014.

The synagogue was once adjoined to a complex with rooms for the rabbi and other functionaries of the community. The synagogue was built atop a cave traditionally thought to have served the prophet Elijah in hiding. The hall center was said to be the place where Elijah anointed Elisha. During the Syrian civil war, the synagogue was hit by mortar bombs, looted, and later two-thirds of the structure was totally destroyed at the end of May 2014.

== Description ==
According to a 1959 article from The Jewish Quarterly Review using the Syrian cadastre of the Djobar district and confronting its data with a then-recent Israeli article, "its east side was 17.3 m (57 ft) long, its west side 15.7 m (52 ft) and the building 12.13 m (39.8 ft) wide. According to [Ben Zion] Lurya ..., it would be 18.4 m long and 11.6 m wide."

Benjamin II, who visited Syria in the late 1840s, described the synagogue as reminding him of "the Mosque Moawiah". "The interior is supported by 13 marble pillars, six on the right and seven on the left side, and is everywhere inlaid with marble." (He thus confirms the number of columns already mentioned by a late-15th-century author.) "There is only one portal by which to enter. Under the holy shrine ... is a grotto ... the descent to which is by a flight of about 20 steps. According to the Jews, the Prophet Elisha is said to have found in this grotto a place of refuge.... At the entrance of the synagogue, toward the middle of the wall to the right, is an irregularly formed stone, on which can be observed the traces of several steps. Tradition asserts that upon this step sat King Hazael when the Prophet Elisha anointed him king."

== History and traditions ==
The synagogue had a plaque stating it was from 720 b.c.e and was frequently but incorrectly perceived to be a 2,000-year-old synagogue located in the suburb of Jobar, Damascus. The earliest verifiable literary sources indicate that it is at least medieval in origin. It was built in commemoration of the biblical prophet Elijah, and has been a place of Jewish pilgrimage for many centuries. It also is the burial-place of a wonder-working sage of the sixteenth century.

According to tradition, the synagogue was built atop a cave where the prophet Elijah concealed himself during persecution. The synagogue was said to have been built by Elisha and repaired during the first century by Eleazar ben Arach. Another tradition states that the biblical anointing by Elisha of King Hazael of Syria took place at the synagogue.

Though much cited as one of the earliest sources mentioning the existence of a synagogue at Jobar is from the Talmud, there is no incontrovertible evidence to support the reading that states that Rabbi Rafram bar Pappa prayed there. The challenge to this interpretation has also led to discord and controversy (although according to the anthropologist and researcher Dr. Adam Blitz, from the content and comparison with the traditional explanations it is clear that the town of Abi Gobar was in Babylonia and not near Damascus.)

=== Medieval period ===
During the medieval period, Jobar was home to a significant Jewish community. In 1210, a French Jew, Samuel ben Samson, while visiting Damascus, recounted the "beautiful synagogue situated outside the city", i.e. in Jobar. An anonymous Jewish traveller who arrived a few years after the Spanish immigration to the Levant following the 1492 Edict of Expulsion of the Jews of Spain, found 60 Jewish families living in the village of Jobar, who had a very beautiful synagogue. "I have never seen anything like it," says the author; "it is supported by thirteen columns." Shams Ibn Tulun Al Dimashki (1475-1546 or 48) mentions that "Jobar is a Jewish village with a Muslim presence." The Chronicle of Joseph Sambari (1672) says that the Jewish community of Damascus lived chiefly in Jobar, and he knows of the synagogue of Elisha and the cave of Elijah the Tishbite.

=== 19th century onward ===
J. J. Benjamin ("Benjamin II"; visited in the late 1840s) described the synagogue in some detail (more at "Description").

Last week the wicked entered the synagogue at Djobar and pillaged the whole edifice. The holy scrolls they have torn into pieces; they even took some of these holy coverings of the scrolls and other sacred writings and used them most contemptuously.

— "A private letter from Damascus", June 4, 1840.
The New Yorker.

Documents from the early 19th century reveal properties in the village that belonged to Jewish wakf (religious endowment), which were leased to members of other communities. During the rioting following accusation of ritual murder against the Jews of Damascus in 1840, the mob fell upon the synagogue, pillaged it and destroyed the scrolls of the Law. In 1847, only one Jewish family was left in the village, and they took care of the synagogue. On festival days, many of Jews from Damascus assembled at the synagogue to worship and during the year, the synagogue was often visited by Jews. A few rooms in the court adjoining the synagogue were used as a retreat by some Damascus Jews for a few days during the spring and summer.

After the establishment of the State of Israel, Jews in Syria faced greater discrimination as the Syrian government enforced tighter restrictions on them. Jewish property could not be sold and those that had been abandoned were confiscated. Part of the land associated with the synagogue was taken over and converted into a school for displaced Palestinian Arabs.

The synagogue is venerated as one of Syria's holiest pilgrimage site for Jews. In the past, sick people were brought into the cavern below the synagogue and left there alone at night in the hope that Elisha's spirit would exercise a healing influence over them.

=== Syrian civil war ===
In March 2013, reports surfaced that the synagogue had been burned to the ground during the Syrian civil war, with both government and rebel forces trading blame over which party looted and destroyed the building. However, later during the year photographs were published and a video emerged showing that the synagogue was still standing but had suffered from mortar fire with damage to the ceiling and the bimah. By May 2014 the majority of the structure had been totally demolished with only the right wing remaining. Blame was directed at the Syrian army who mistakenly hit the synagogue while targeting a nearby rebel enclave although some claim rebels were hiding in the synagogue complex. Subsequently there has been concern that items from the ruins would be looted and illegally sold. Private funds were raised in an attempt to restore the synagogue. The restoration project is being undertaken with the approval of the Syrian and Russian governments.

=== Post-Assad ===
On 17 December 2024, the Times of Israel reported that Jewish relics from the synagogue would be returned to Syria. The Times of Israel later reported, in September 2025, that damaged items from the synagogue, including Torah scrolls, were being kept in storage at the National Museum of Damascus, having been brought there in 2017.

== See also ==
- Cave of Elijah
- History of the Jews in Syria
- List of synagogues in Syria
