= Damascus affair =

1840 blood libel in Damascus, Syria

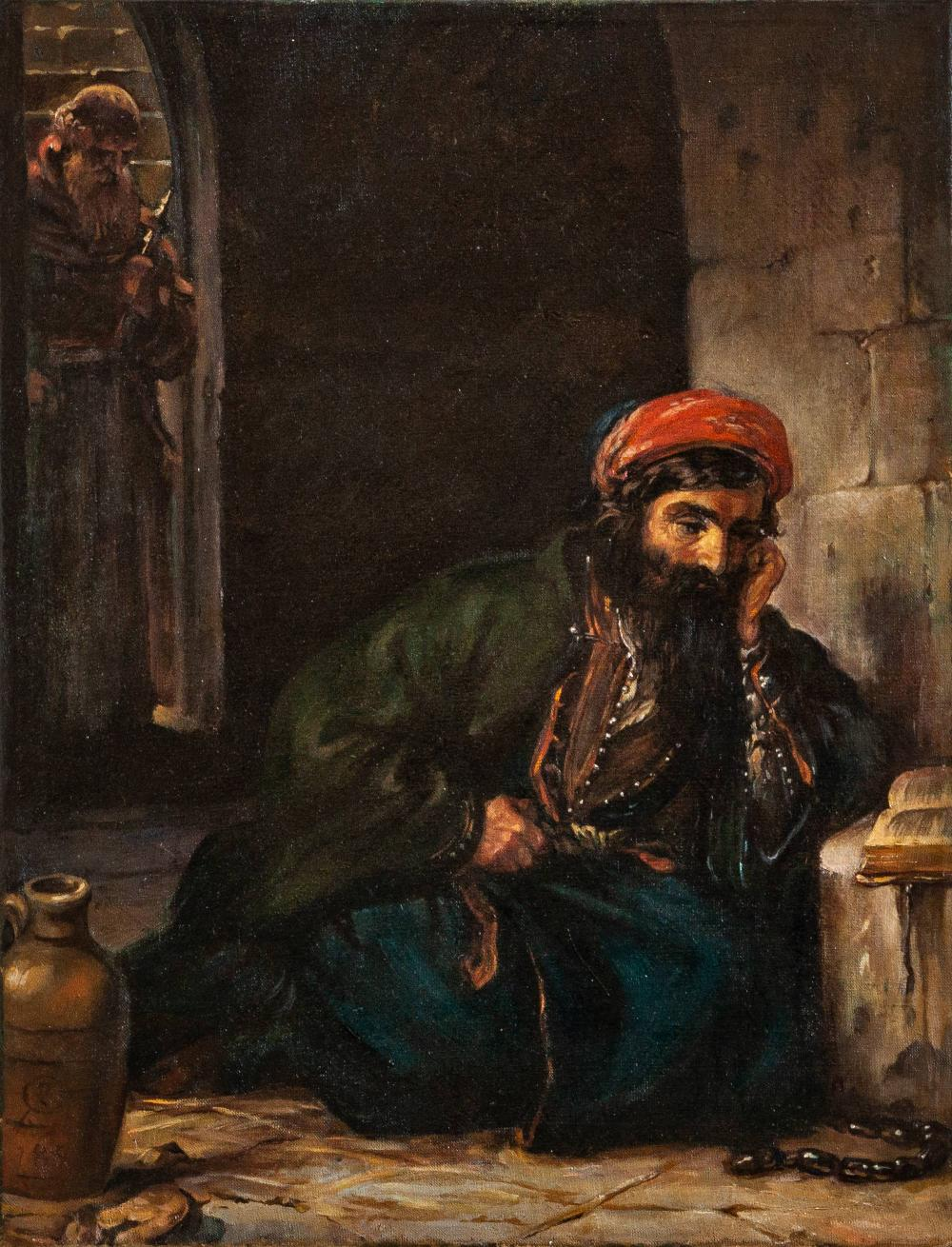
A Jewish prisoner preparing his defence with a Capuchin friar in the doorway. Painting by Moritz Daniel Oppenheim.

The Damascus affair of February 1840 was the disappearance of an Italian Catholic monk and his Muslim servant in Damascus' Jewish quarter, for which a large number of Jews were summarily tortured until they confessed to murder. As an instance of antisemitism and a blood libel, news of the case spread, across the Middle East, to Europe, and the Western world.

The Christians were supported in their accusation by the French consul at Damascus, Ulysse de Ratti-Menton, a person described by historians as antisemitic and known to favour Christian merchants and advisers over their Jewish counterparts. Ratti-Menton ordered that an investigation be carried out in the Jewish quarter where both men had last been seen and encouraged the Egyptian governor of Damascus to act upon the matter, which resulted in the accused being imprisoned and interrogated under torture after which they confessed to the murder.

Antisemitism increased, with Muslims and Christians alike attacking Jews. This drew international attention, and European Jewry were horrified. Jewish British leader Sir Moses Montefiore and Adolphe Crémieux of France were publicly outraged. In contrition, Muhammad Ali of Egypt released the remaining prisoners, but refused to acquit them. It was not until November 1840, after Egyptian withdrawal and the restoration of Ottoman Syria, that Sultan Abdulmejid I decreed all charges should be lifted.

== Background ==
In 1840, Damascus belonged to the Ottoman Empire. Under Ottoman rule, the society was organized by the so-called millet system, which divided the Ottoman subjects into different millets based on their religious affiliation. This system guaranteed considerable autonomy to the different millets as long as its members remained loyal to the sultan. The Muslim millet was by far the biggest since Islam was the dominant religion. Christians and Jews were considered dhimmis—a class of non-Muslims possessing legal rights under Muslim rule—and allowed to practice their own religion. In return, the Christians and the Jews had to pay jizya (a special tax imposed on non-Muslim subjects), and they possessed a lower legal and social status than their fellow Muslim citizens. Under the pressure of European powers, who sought to establish a better status for the Christian communities in the Ottoman Empire, sultan Abdülmecid decreed in 1839 that all subjects, regardless of their religion, were equal before the law. This edict of Gülhane signalled the start of almost three decades of modernization, known as the Tanzimat period, which was aimed at a reorganization of the Empire.

Since the beginning of the sixteenth century, Syria had been part of the Ottoman Empire. However, in 1831, eight years before the Tanzimat reforms, Ottoman Syria had come under the control of the Egyptian Muhammad Ali, the viceroy of Ottoman Egypt who had turned against the sultan. Muhammad Ali was said to have been influenced by European powers, particularly by France, which often attempted to safeguard and ameliorate the position of members of Catholic orders in the region. Under the rule of Muhammad Ali, the rights afforded to the Christian population increased and, like the Muslim inhabitants of the region, they were conscripted into the army. These new rights strained the relationship between the Muslim majority and their non-Muslim counterparts. However, the relationship between other non-Muslim groups could become tense as well. The relation between Jewish and Christian communities was tense as the result of economic rivalry between the two communities in which the Jewish merchants often acquired the most economic prosperity. In this economic struggle, both groups sought the support of the Muslim majority. In general, the relationship between Jewish and Muslim communities was better than the relation between Muslim and Christian communities, which was partially caused by Muslims' resentment at the new rights afforded to the Christians under the rule of Muhammad Ali.

== Disappearance and accusations ==
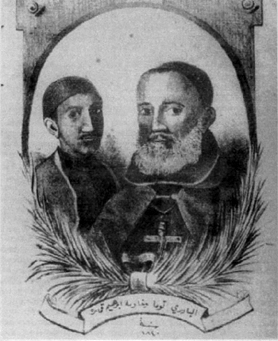
Contemporary drawing of Father Thomas and his servant Ibrahim Amara

On February 5, 1840, Father Thomas, an Italian monk belonging to a Franciscan Capuchin establishment from the Island of Sardinia, and his Muslim servant, Ibrahim Amrah, disappeared in Damascus' Jewish quarter. Soon after their disappearance the Jewish community was accused by the Christians of murdering Father Thomas and his servant, and to have extracted their blood in order to bake matzo. The accusation that the blood of Christians was used by Jewish people for their Passover bread is commonly known as the blood libel which has its roots in medieval Europe. In 1840 Damascus, the Christians were supported in their accusation by the French consul at Damascus, Ulysse de Ratti-Menton, an antisemite who was known to favour Christian merchants and advisers over their Jewish counterparts. Upon Father Thomas' disappearance, Ratti-Menton ordered that an investigation be carried out in the Jewish quarter. Because French officials had a good relationship with Muhammad Ali, who then controlled Ottoman Syria, Ratti-Menton got the support of Sharif Pasha, the Egyptian governor (wali) of the city and the son-in-law of Muhammad Ali.

A confession was extracted under torture from a Jewish barber called Negrin who told the persecutors that he, together with seven other notable Jewish men (including members of the influential Farḥī family), had killed Father Thomas on the night of his disappearance. These other men were interrogated under torture as well, during which five of the seven prisoners confessed to the murder of the Father and his servant. Although there is no consensus among scholars about the number, it is believed that some prisoners died during their interrogation. More atrocities occurred later as authorities seized sixty-three Jewish children as hostages to hold until their mothers revealed the location of the blood.

When bones were discovered in a Jewish quarter, Ratti-Menton and Sharif Pasha considered this discovery as a confirmation of the confession extracted from the imprisoned Jews. More Jews were accused and arrested on charges of involvement in the murder of Father Thomas. In the direct aftermath of the blood libel and the arrests, the Christians and Muslims of Damascus committed violence against the Jewish population. According to the Jewish Encyclopedia (1901–1906) the synagogue in the suburb Jobar was pillaged by a mob in a reaction to the blood libel and the scrolls of the Law were destroyed.

=== Release of the prisoners ===
The Damascus affair increased the concern of European Jews about the situation of their Arab co-religionists. The Austrian Consul in Aleppo Eliahu Picciotto reported the incident to the Jewish communities in Europe, and made representations to Ibrahim Pasha, Muhammad Ali's son in Egypt, who then ordered an investigation into the matter. Sir Moses Montefiore, a British politician and leader of the British Jewish community, and the French lawyer Adolphe Crémieux, called on Muhammed 'Ali to release the Jewish prisoners. Negotiations about their release lasted from 4 to 28 August. In the end, Muhammed 'Ali released the prisoners who had remained alive, but without officially acquitting the prisoners of the charged brought against them. Only in November 1840, when Syria fell under Ottoman rule again, Sultan Abdülmecid I issued a firmān (edict) denouncing the blood libel of Damascus. The edict declared that blood libel accusations are a slander against Jews and are prohibited throughout the Ottoman Empire. A part of the edict reads:

"... and for the love we bear to our subjects, we cannot permit the Jewish nation, whose innocence for the crime alleged against them is evident, to be worried and tormented as a consequence of accusations which have not the least foundation in truth...".

The Damascus affair is illustrative of the tensions that existed between the Jewish and Christian populations of Syria. The incident is also notable for being an exception to the rule of Jewish-Muslim relations. During the Tanzimat period, Jewish-Muslim relations were generally much better than Christian-Muslim relations, which had been strained by the economic ascendancy afforded to the Christian community with the relaxation and the eventual elimination of the dhimmi status rules in the 1850s. While occasional outbreaks of anti-Jewish violence erupted during this time, far more serious outbreaks of violence occurred between Muslims and Christians and between Christians and Druzes.

In the remainder of the 19th century and into the 20th century, there were many other instances of the blood libel in Ottoman lands. These instances most often came from Christian communities, sometimes with the connivance of Greek or French diplomats. The Jews could usually count on the goodwill of the Ottoman authorities and increasingly on the support of British, Prussian and Austrian representatives.

== Reactions and aftermath ==
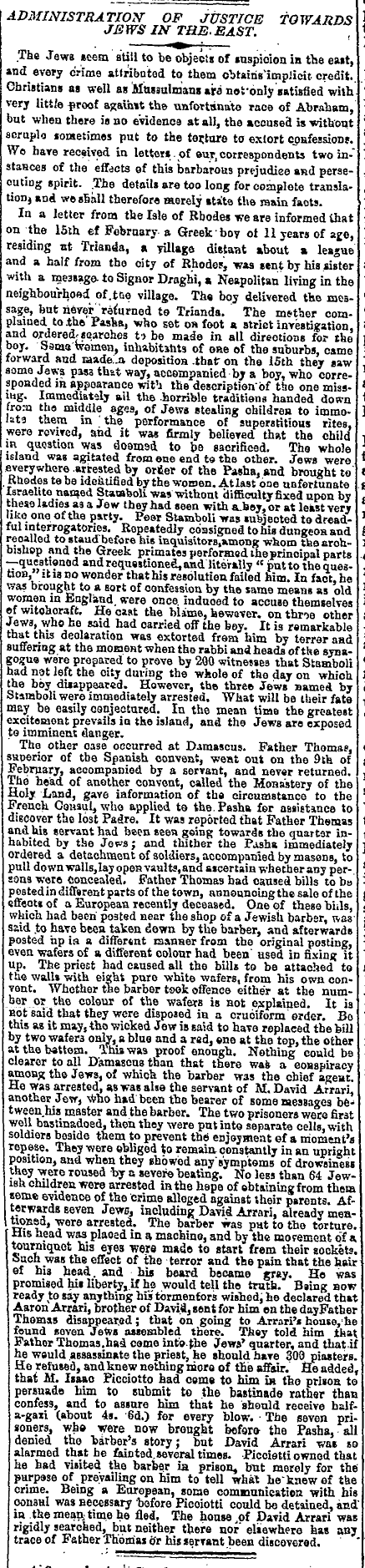
The Rhodes blood libel and the Damascus affair, reported together in The Times, Apr 18, 1840

In a new and groundbreaking effort, the American Jewish community of 15,000 protested in six American cities on behalf of their Syrian brethren. "For the first time in American Jewish life, Jews ... organized themselves politically to help Diaspora Jewry in distress." Among the new ethnic immigrant populations to the United States, the Jews were the first to attempt to sway the government to act on behalf of their kin and co-religionists abroad; with this incident, they became involved in the politics of foreign policy, persuading but not pressuring President Van Buren to protest officially. The United States consul in Egypt expressed the protest.

According to Hasia R. Diner, in The Jews of the United States, 1654 to 2000, "For the Jews, the Damascus affair launched modern Jewish politics on an international scale, and for American Jews it represented their first effort at creating a distinctive political agenda. Just as the United States had used this affair to proclaim its presence on the global scale, so too did American Jews, in their newspapers and at mass meetings, announce to their coreligionists in France and England that they too ought to be thought of players in global Jewish diplomacy."

According to Johannes Valentin Schwarz, the events also encouraged the growth of a modern Jewish press. "As a result, a sense of solidarity was evoked among the Jewish communities of Europe they had never experienced before. Thus, the Damascus Affair gave birth to modern Jewish press especially in Western Europe, such as to the long-lived papers Les Archives Israélites de France (1840–1935) in Paris or The Jewish Chronicle (1841 ff.) in London."

== Later references to the affair ==
Accusations of the affair were published in the Egyptian daily Al Akhbar in 2000 and again in 2001 in an article titled "The Last Scene in the Life of Father Toma". In 2002, the Middle East Media Research Institute reported that some of the 1840 accusations emerged in a 1983 book The Damascus Blood Libel (1840) by the Syrian Minister of Defense, Mustafa Tlass. The book was described as being influential in international antisemitic circles as a reliable source of information on "ritual murder by the Jews." In 1983, Tlass wrote and published The Matzah of Zion, which is a treatment of the Damascus affair of 1840 and repeats the ancient "blood libel", that Jews use the blood of murdered non-Jews in religious rituals such as baking Matza bread. In this book, he argues that the true religious beliefs of Jews are "black hatred against all humans and religions", and that no Arab country should ever sign a peace treaty with Israel. Tlass re-printed the book several times, and he stands by its conclusions. Following the book's publication, Tlass told Der Spiegel that this accusation against Jews was valid and that his book is "an historical study ... based on documents from France, Vienna and the American University in Beirut."

In 2007, Lebanese poet Marwan Chamoun, in an interview aired on Télé Liban, referred to the "... slaughter of the priest Tomaso de Camangiano ... in 1840... in the presence of two rabbis in the heart of Damascus, in the home of a close friend of this priest, Daud Al-Harari, the head of the Jewish community of Damascus. After he was slaughtered, his blood was collected, and the two rabbis took it."

The novel Death of a Monk (2004), written by the Israeli author Alon Hilu, is based on the affair.

The blood libel was featured in a scene in the Syrian TV series Ash-Shatat in 2003, while in 2013 the Israeli website Arutz Sheva reported cases of Israeli Arabs asking "where Jews find the Christian blood they need to bake matza".

The audio drama The Damascus Affair – for Narrator and Orchestra, created by Israeli composer Nissim Khalifa (text by Elioz Hefer Antebi), is based on the affair and writings of Rabbi Ya'akov Antebi.

The Damascus affair was presented as fact by American academic Samar Maqusi during a guest lecture at University College London in 2025. Maqusi was subsequently banned from campus and the university made an official statement of apology.

== See also ==
- Antisemitic canard
- Blood libel against Jews
- History of the Jews in Syria
- History of the Jews under Muslim rule
- Syrian Jews
- Jeddah Massacre of 1858
