= 1949 Menarsha synagogue bombing =

Bombing in Syria

1949 Menarsha synagogue attack
- Part of the Arab–Israeli conflict
- Native name: טבח בית הכנסת אלמנשה בדמשק
- Location: 33.5138°N 36.2913°E; Jewish quarter, Damascus, Syria
- Date: 5 August 1949; 77 years ago Evening of 5 August 1949 (Shabbat eve) (UTC+2)
- Attack type: Grenade attack, Mass murder, Anti-Jewish violence
- Weapon: Hand grenades
- Deaths: 12 civilians (including 8 children)
- Injuries: ≈30 civilians
- Perpetrators: Unknown (suspects later arrested and acquitted)
- Motive: Anti-Jewish sentiment, political destabilization during armistice talks
- Convictions: None
- Occurred during the Lausanne Conference of 1949; simultaneous attack at Aleppo's Great Synagogue

The Menarsha synagogue attack took place on 5 August 1949 in the Jewish quarter of Damascus, Syria. The grenade attack claimed the lives of 12 civilians and injured about 30. Most of the victims were children.

== Background ==
The security situation of the Syrian Jewish community deteriorated in the late 1930s, during a period of increased Arab nationalism, pressure for independence from the French Empire leading to Syrian independence in 1946, following World War II. Anti-Western and Arab nationalist fervour took on an increasingly anti-Jewish tone. Before and after the establishment of the State of Israel in 1948, the Jews in Syria faced greater discrimination as the government adopted anti-Jewish measures. During this period, Jews and their property became the target of numerous attacks, including the Aleppo pogrom in 1947.

Military officer Husni al-Za'im seized power in Syria in a military coup on March 30, 1949. Syria subsequently signed an armistice with Israel, ending its participation in the 1948 Arab–Israeli War.

== Attack ==
On Friday 5 August 1949, Shabbat eve, several attackers threw hand grenades into the Menarsha Synagogue in Damascus that killed 12 Jews, 8 of them children, and injured about 30. The attack occurred at the time of the Lausanne Conference, when Syria and other frontline Arab states were conducting armistice talks with Israel at Lausanne, Switzerland. The armistice agreement between Israel and Syria had been signed on 20 July 1949. A simultaneous attack was also carried out at the Great Synagogue in Aleppo.

== Reactions ==
Al-Za'im sent his personal representative to visit the carnage area and ordered a legal probe. Syrian Premier Muhsen Barazi visited the scene of the blast and called the bombing an attack on the government. Israel formally protested to the United Nations Conciliation Commission for Palestine and notified the Syrian government that the attack could impede the ongoing Lausanne Conference talks.

== Aftermath ==
The bombing was one of the worst violent acts against Jews in the Middle East since the end of the war.

Syrian authorities attributed the attack to an underground movement called the Arab Redemption Suicide Phalange, or to Communists.

According to the Associated Press, the bombing was thought to be the work of a small group of non-Communist, anti-Jewish Arabs opposed to the Syrian government. The bombing occurring during the Lausanne Conference, when Israel and its four opponents during the 1948 war -- Syria, Lebanon, Jordan, and Egypt -- reached a crucial stage during final peace talks. The bombing's goal may have been to foment opposition to al-Za'im and sabotage the peace talks. Since taking office, al-Za'im had restored full legal rights to Syrian Jews and placed a number of them in positions of public office.

On 9 August, a seventeen-year-old Syrian veteran of the 1948 Arab–Israeli War confessed that he and two friends were behind the attack. By 11 August, Syrian authorities had arrested 11 youths, including several high school students.

President al-Za'im ordered the execution of the accused, but a few days later the coup of Colonel Sami al-Hinnawi took place and al-Za'im was executed. On 18 August, more than 200 prisoners in Syrian jails, including three accused of the bombing, were released. Before his execution, Zaim had announced that the three had confessed to the bombing and would be sentenced to death.

In 1950, the suspects of the attack were acquitted due to a lack of evidence.
