= Khan al-Arous =

- خان العروس
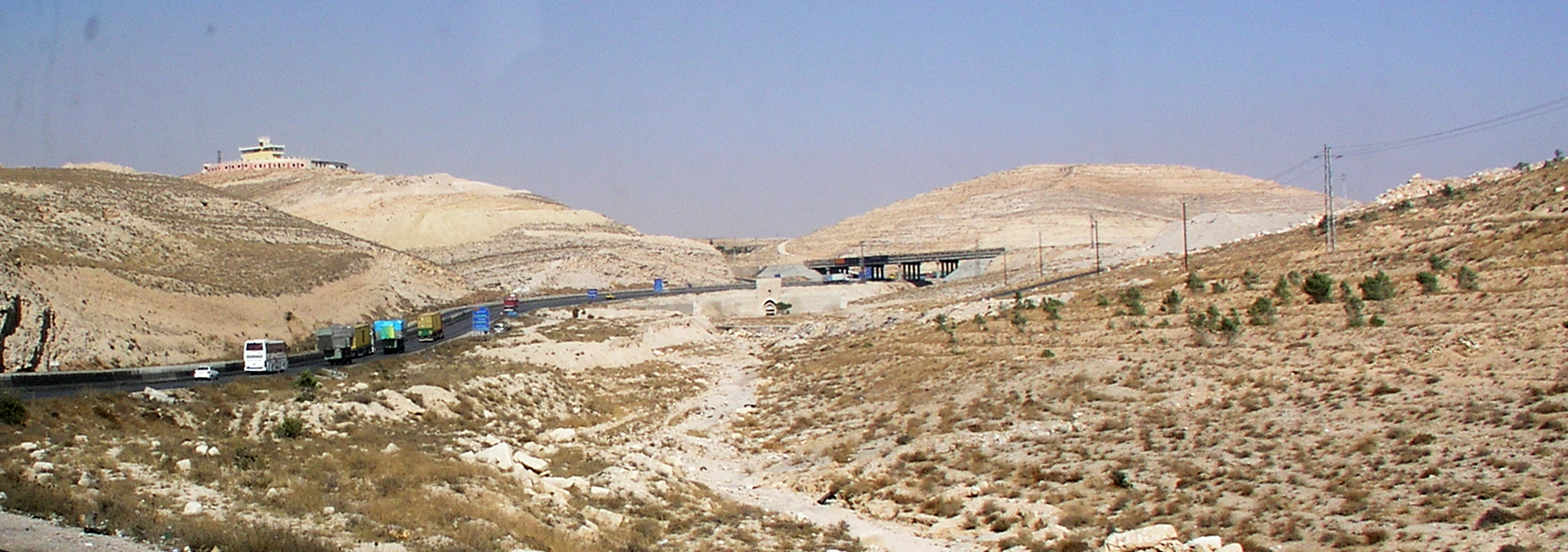
- Khan al-Arous in 2010
- Interactive map of the Khan al-Arous area
- Alternative names: Bride Khan

General information
- Type: Limestone
- Architectural style: Ayyubid Architecture
- Location: Al-Qutayfah, Rif Dimashq Governorate
- Coordinates: 33.789433°N 36.571377°E
- Construction started: 1181
- Completed: 1182
- Client: Saladin

Khan al-Arous (Arabic: خان العروس; The Bride Khan) is a small khan in Al-Qutayfah, Rif Dimashq Governorate, Syria

== See also ==
- Khan As'ad Pasha
- Khan Jaqmaq
- Khan Sulayman Pasha
- Khan Tuman
