= Khan al-Harir (Damascus) =

Coordinates: 33°30′37″N 36°18′20″E

- خَان الْحَرِير
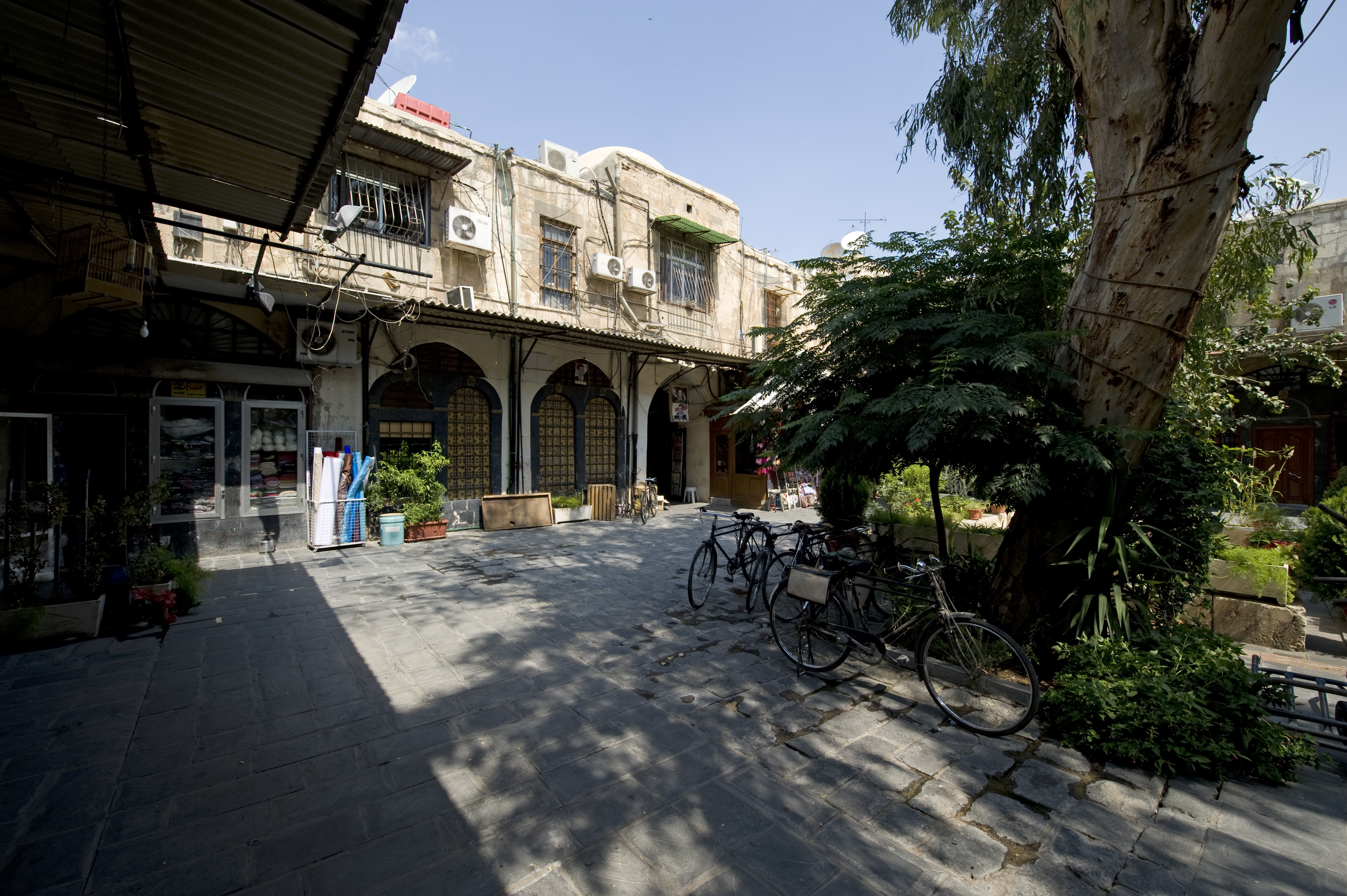
- Khan al-Harir in 2008
- Interactive map of the Khan al-Harir area
- Alternative names: Silk Khan

General information
- Type: Caravanserai
- Architectural style: Ottoman
- Location: Damascus, Syria
- Construction started: 1573
- Completed: 1574
- Client: Darwish Pasha

Technical details
- Floor count: 2
- Floor area: 2,500 square metres (27,000 sq ft)

Khan al-Harir (Arabic: خَان الْحَرِير, romanized: Khān al-Ḥarīr; The Silk Khan) is a large khan in the Old City of Damascus.

== See also ==
- Khan As'ad Pasha
- Khan Jaqmaq
- Khan Sulayman Pasha
- Khan Tuman

== Bibliography ==
- Burns, Ross (2005). Damascus: A History. Routledge. ISBN 978-0-415-27105-9.
