= Bab al-Jabiyah =

Ancient city gate of Damascus, Syria

Coordinates: 33°30′29.25″N 36°18′6″E

Bab al-Jabiya (Arabic: بَابُ الْجَابِيَّةِ, romanized: Bāb al-Jābīyah; Gate of the Water Trough) is one of the seven ancient city-gates of Damascus, Syria. During the Roman era, the gate was dedicated to Mars. Bab al-Jabiya was the main entrance on the city's west side. The gate opens on Medhat Pasha Souq, which is the modern western half of the Street Called Straight, the Roman east-west artery (decumanus), which still connects it to Bab Sharqi (the Roman "Gate of the Sun"). The gate's modern name dates to the Umayyad period and comes from the name of Jabiyah in the Golan Heights, then the capital city of the Ghassanids, allies of the Roman Empire.

== History ==
During Roman times the gate was a typical tripartite gate with three entrances; a central carriageway for wheeled vehicles, flanked by two pedestrian entrances. Close to the gate is where the Roman Temple of Jupiter and the Theatre of Herod the Great (modern Bayt al-Aqqad), once stood.

Damascus was conquered by Muslims In the Rashidu era. During the Siege of Damascus, the Muslim general Abu Ubaidah ibn al Jarrah, entered Damascus peacefully through this gate on 18 September 634. He met the forces of Khalid ibn al-Walid, which entered the city by force from the Bab Sharqi, halfway through the Street Called Straight, near the present day Mariamite Cathedral of Damascus. Under Muslim rule, the gate was partially blocked except for a small pedestrian opening. It was rebuilt during the reign of Nur ad-Din Zengi, and the date was inscribed as 567 Hijri (1171-1172 AD). Other inscriptions reveal that it was renovated again under the Ayyubid Sultan al-Malik al-Mu'azzam, and again under the Mamluks in 687 Hijri (1288-1289 AD).
