= Zhourat shamia =

Mixture of herbs and dried flowers

Shami flowers
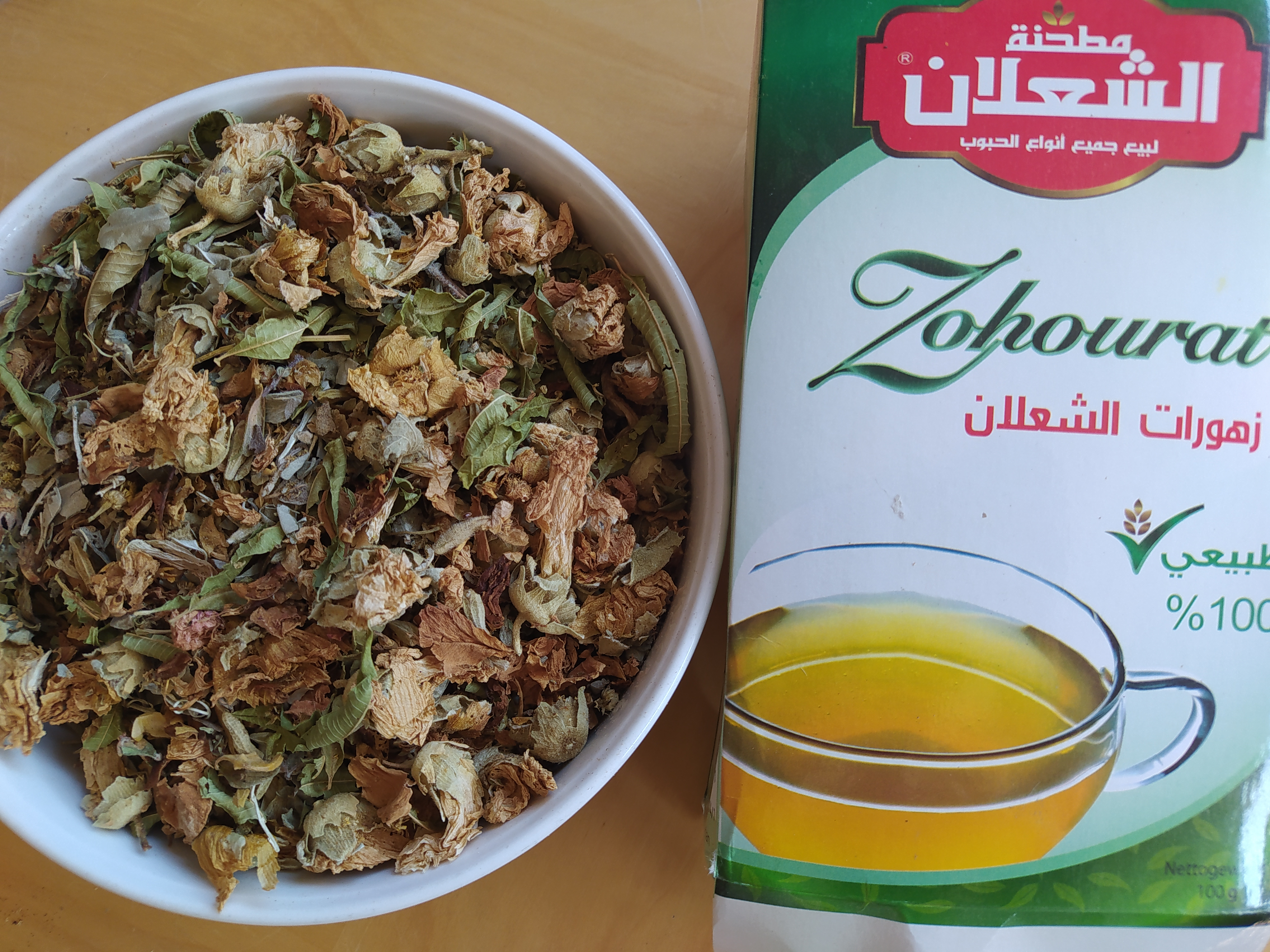
- Type: herbal tea
- Origin: Damascus, Syria

Zhourat shamia (Arabic: زهورات شامية, lit. 'flowers of Sham') is a mixture of herbs and dried flowers that is infused into hot water to make a tea, originally from the Mediterranean Levant area. Its origin is in the ancient souks of Damascus and its surroundings (locally called Sham). In markets such as the historic Al-Buzuriya, in the center of the capital, they are sold by weight or packed.

Sham flowers have gained popularity in the Gulf countries, due to Syrian immigration.

== Ingredients ==
As spring arrives, Syrians flock to valleys, mountains, and fields to collect various indigenous wild herbs, which are then dried and sold. Although it may vary by vendor, generally all mixes contain:

- anise (يانسون),
- Damask rose (زهرة الجوري),
- thyme (زعتر),
- pennyroyal (نعناع البري),
- lavender (خزامى),
- sage (ميرمية),
- violet flower (بنفسج),
- rosemary (إكليل الجبل),
- common rose (ورد),
- chamomile (بابونج),
- lemon balm (ورق المليسة), and
- khatmia or marshmallow flowers (تمية), red or white flowers.

The mixture is not boiled, but infused in hot water, usually mixed with honey or sugar.
