= Bab Sharqi =

Coordinates: 33°30′34″N 36°19′4″E

- بَابٌ شَرْقِيٌّ
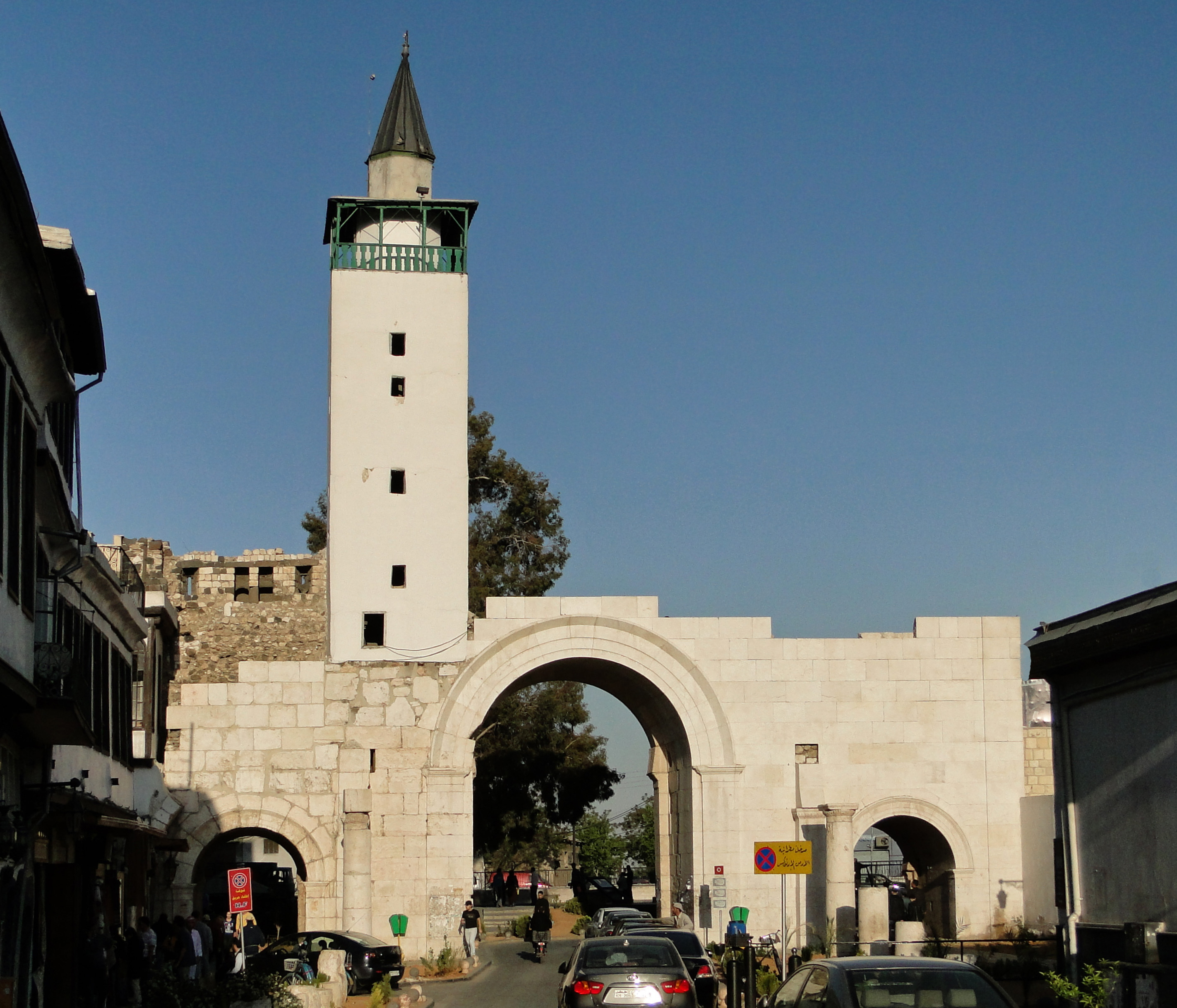
- Bab Sharqi at the end of Street Called Straight
- Interactive map of the Bab Sharqi area
- Alternative names: Gate of the Sun

General information
- Type: City gate
- Location: Damascus, Syria
- Completed: ca. 200 AD

Bab Sharqi (Arabic: بَابٌ شَرْقِيٌّ, romanized: Bāb Šarqī; "The Eastern Gate"), also known as the Gate of the Sun, is one of the seven ancient city gates of Damascus, Syria. Its modern name comes from its location in the eastern side of the city.

In addition to being the only original Roman gate still standing, Bab Sharqi is also the only gate of the eight gates of the Ancient City of Damascus to preserve its original form as a triple passageway, with the large central passageway for caravans and wheel traffic and the two smaller ones flanking the large one for pedestrians.

== History ==
The gate, which was dedicated to the sun by the Romans and known to them as the Gate of The Sun, was established ca. 200 AD. Its architecture was minimal with pilasters projecting from its walls. This was the entrance to the city's Decumanus Maximus known by biblical sources as the Street Called Straight. The Street Called Straight, still connects the eastern gate of the city to the western gate, or Bab al-Jabiyah.

His granting of Christian citizens continued access to their churches in the eastern district started the gradual evolution of the city's Christian Quarter near the gate.

Nur ad-Din Zangi had adjustments made to the gate.
