= Khan Tuman =

Khan Tuman خان طومان
- Village
- Location within Syria
- Coordinates: 36°7′3″N 37°3′3″E
- Country: Syria
- Governorate: Aleppo
- District: Mount Simeon
- Nahiyah: Mount Simeon

Population (2004 census)
  - Total: 2,781
- Time zone: UTC+3 (AST)

Khan Tuman (Arabic: خان طومان) is a village in northern Syria, administratively part of the Mount Simeon District of Aleppo Governorate, located southwest of Aleppo. Nearby localities include Urum al-Kubrah, Urum al-Sughrah, al-Shaykh Ali and al-Zurbah. According to the Syria Central Bureau of Statistics, Khan Tuman had a population of 2,781 in the 2004 census. The village is built on a hill located just east of the Queiq River. It is known for its historical caravanserai which dates back to 1189.

== See also ==
- Khan Tuman (building)
- Khan Tuman (operation)

== Bibliography ==
- Walpole, Robert (1820). Memoirs relating to European and Asiatic Turkey, and other countries of the east, ed. from manuscript journals. 2. ed. Longman.
