= Mariamite Cathedral of Damascus =

Patriarchal cathedral in Damascus, Syria

Mariamite Cathedral of Damascus الكَنِيسَة المَرْيَمِيَّة
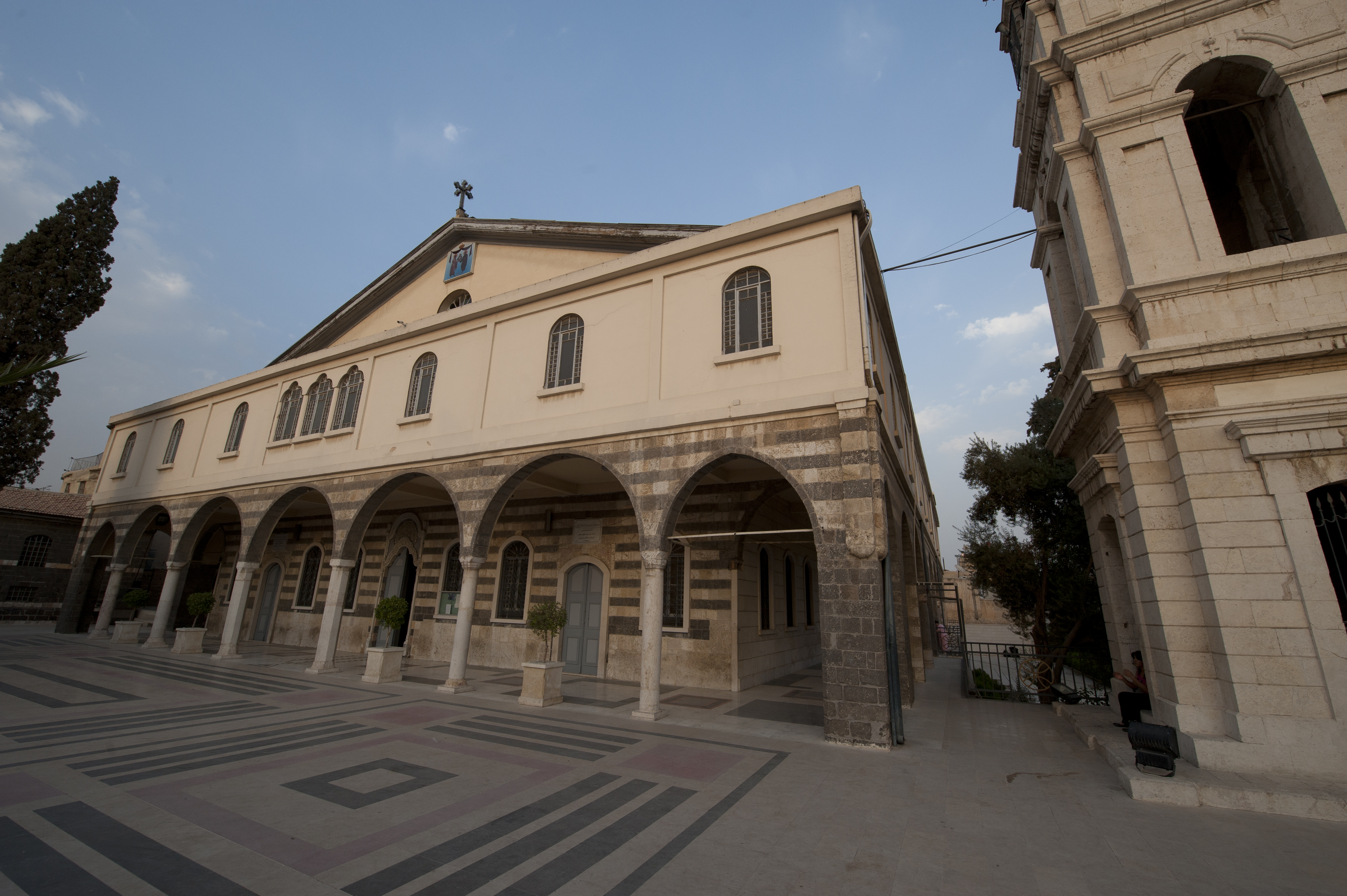

Religion
- Affiliation: Greek Orthodox
- Ecclesiastical or organisational status: Seat of the Greek Orthodox Church of Antioch
- Year consecrated: unknown

Location
- Location: Street called Straight, Damascus, Syria
- Interactive map of Mariamite Cathedral of Damascus الكَنِيسَة المَرْيَمِيَّة
- Coordinates: 33°30′34″N 36°18′41″E

Architecture
- Type: Church

The Mariamite Cathedral of Damascus, also known as the Maryamiyya Church (Arabic: الكَنِيسَة المَرْيَمِيَّة, romanized: al-Kanīsah al-Maryamīyah), is one of the oldest Greek Orthodox churches in Damascus, Syria and holds the seat of the Greek Orthodox Church of Antioch. The church complex is located on the Street Called Straight.

== History ==
A first church was built at an unknown time. After the Muslim conquest of Damascus the church was closed until 706 AD when al-Walid ordered that it be returned to the Christians as compensation for the Church of John the Baptist which was turned into the Umayyad Mosque.

The church was destroyed and rebuilt several times in later years. It was described by Ibn Jubayr as:

Inside the town there is a church which is very important to the Romans. It is known as the Church of Mary. Its importance comes after the Church of Jerusalem. It is a beautiful building includes miraculous pictures which appeal to mind and eyes. It is in the hands of the Romans and nobody objects to them at it.

In 1342, the Patriarchal See of Antioch was transferred from Antioch to Damascus and the church served as the seat of the Greek Orthodox Church in the East.

The church was burned down by mobs, along with most of the Christian quarter, when the 1860 Druze-Christian conflict in Lebanon spilt over into Damascus, and was rebuilt three years later. It was last renovated in 1953.

== Sections ==
=== Church of Mary ===
The Church of Mary is the main church building, and dates back to the late 4th century.

=== Chapel of Saint Tekla ===
The chapel was added to the complex after the restoration of the cathedral in 1840. It comprises the patriarchal seat of the Greek Orthodox Church of Antioch.

=== Chapel of Catherine ===
The chapel was added after restoration works. It contains a small museum dedicated to the history of the church.

== Gallery ==
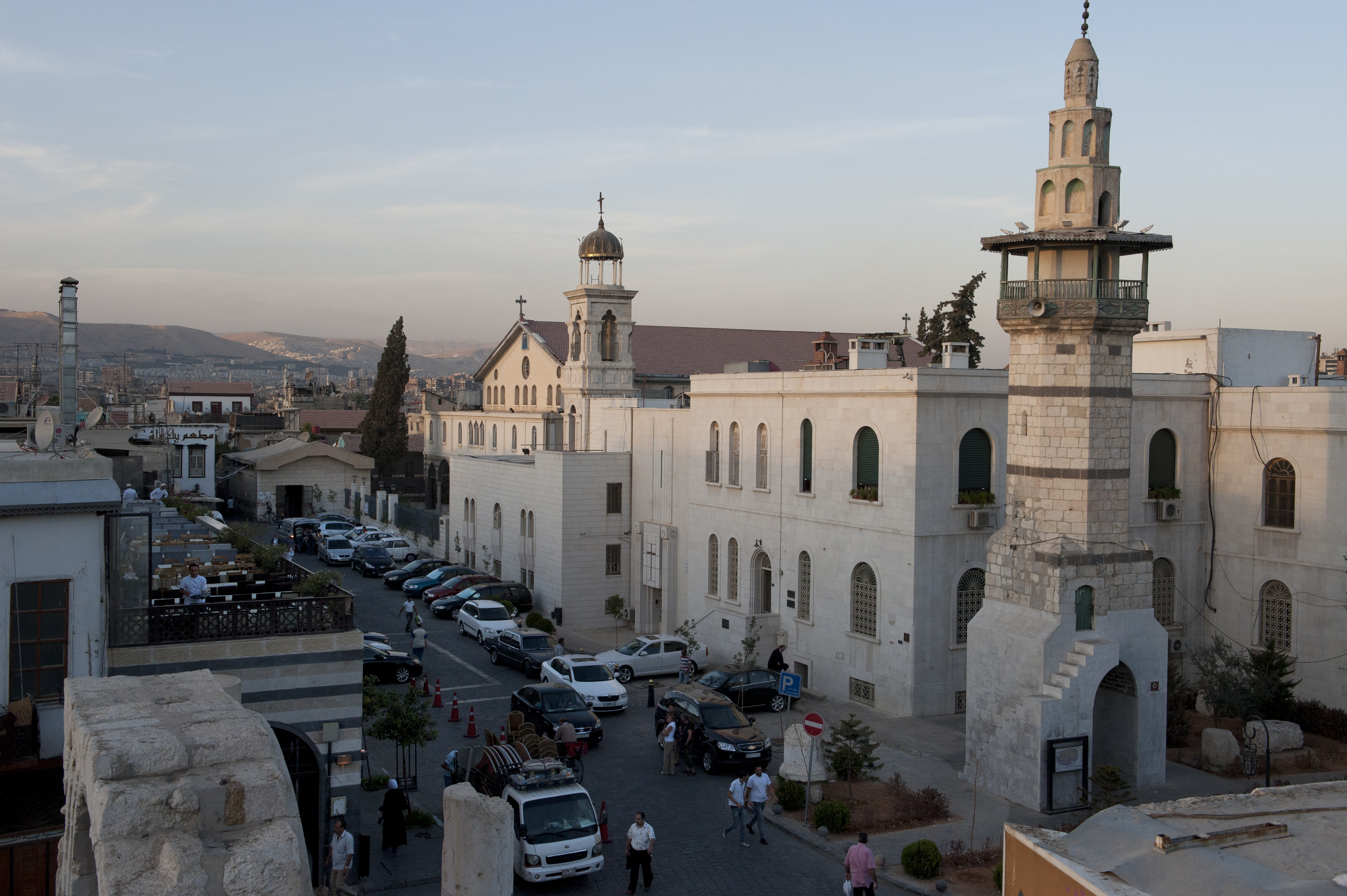
Mariamite Cathedral, Damascus, with the 'Umariyya Minaret at the front, to the right

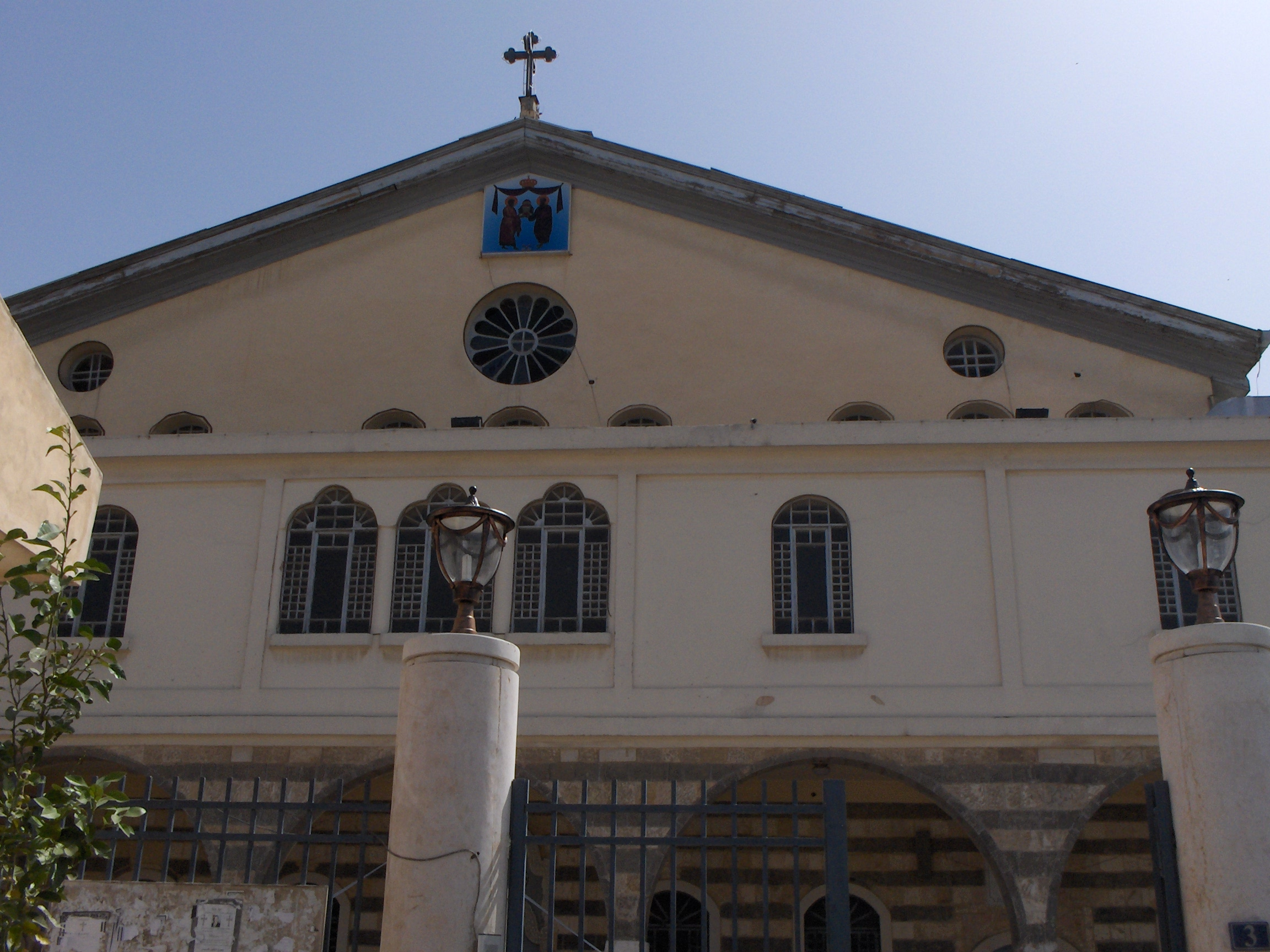
Façade of the cathedral in 2010

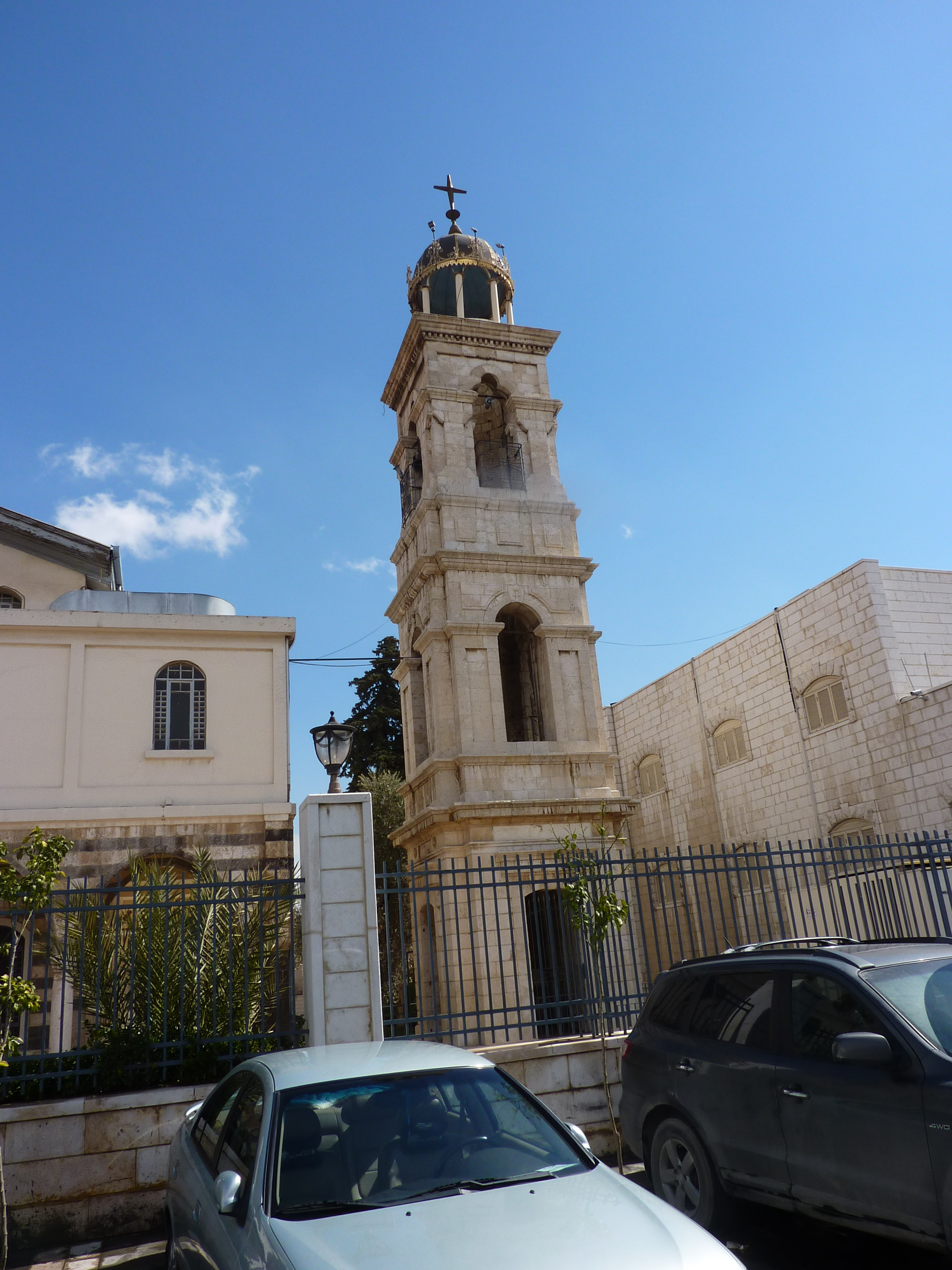
Belfry of the cathedral
