= Khan Jaqmaq =

- خَان جَقْمَق
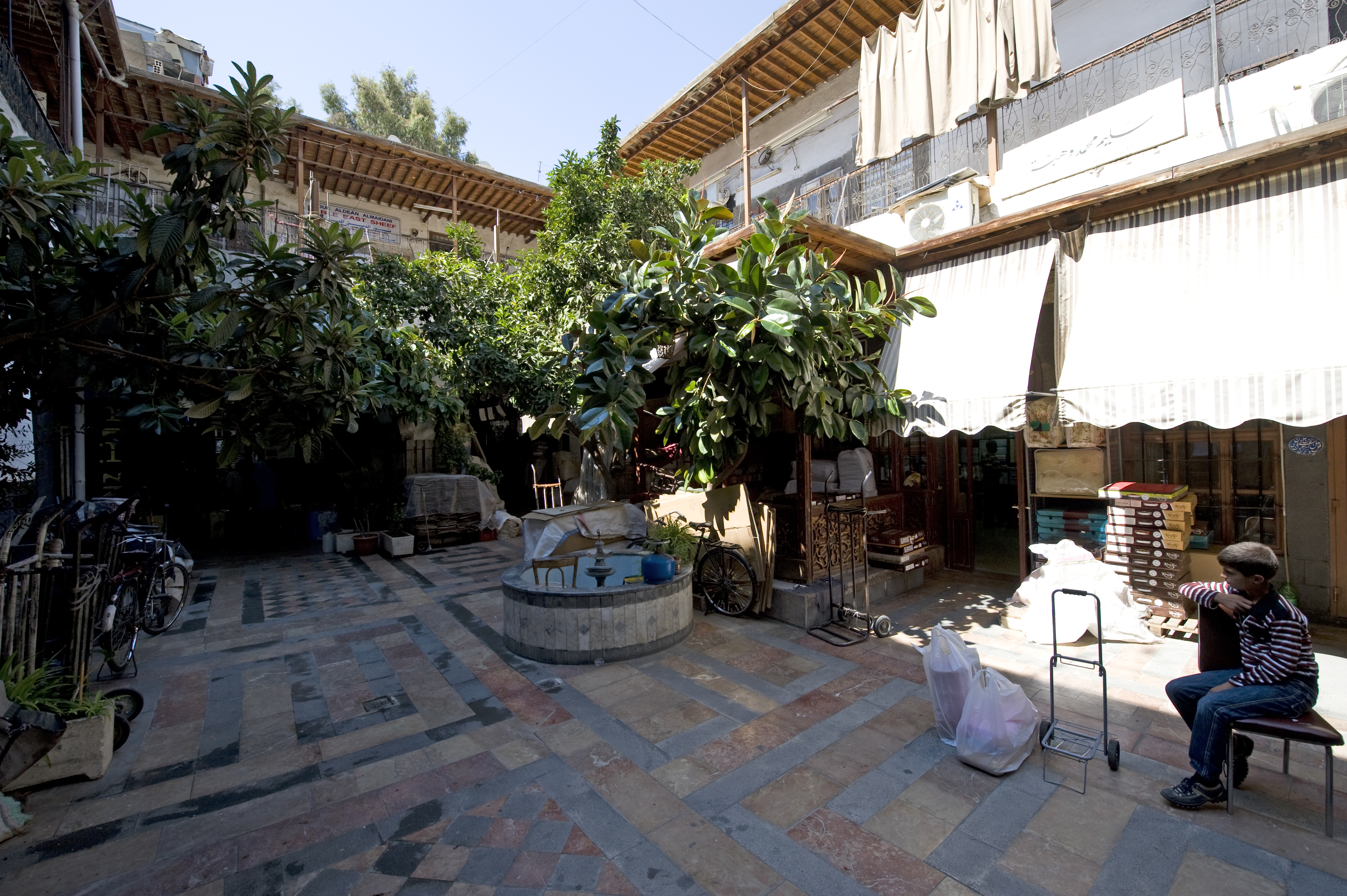
- Khan Jaqmaq in 2008
- Interactive map of the Khan Jaqmaq area

General information
- Type: Caravanserai
- Architectural style: Mamluk
- Location: Damascus, Syria, Street called Straight
- Construction started: 1419
- Completed: 1420
- Client: Sayf ad-Din Jaqmaq

Technical details
- Floor count: 2

Khan Jaqmaq (Arabic: خَان جَقْمَق, romanized: Ḵān Jaqmaq) is one of the few remaining khans in the Old City of Damascus, it was built by the Mamluk emir, Sayf ad-Din Jaqmaq who was governor of Damascus in 1418–20. It was rebuilt to a great extent in 1601.

== Gallery ==
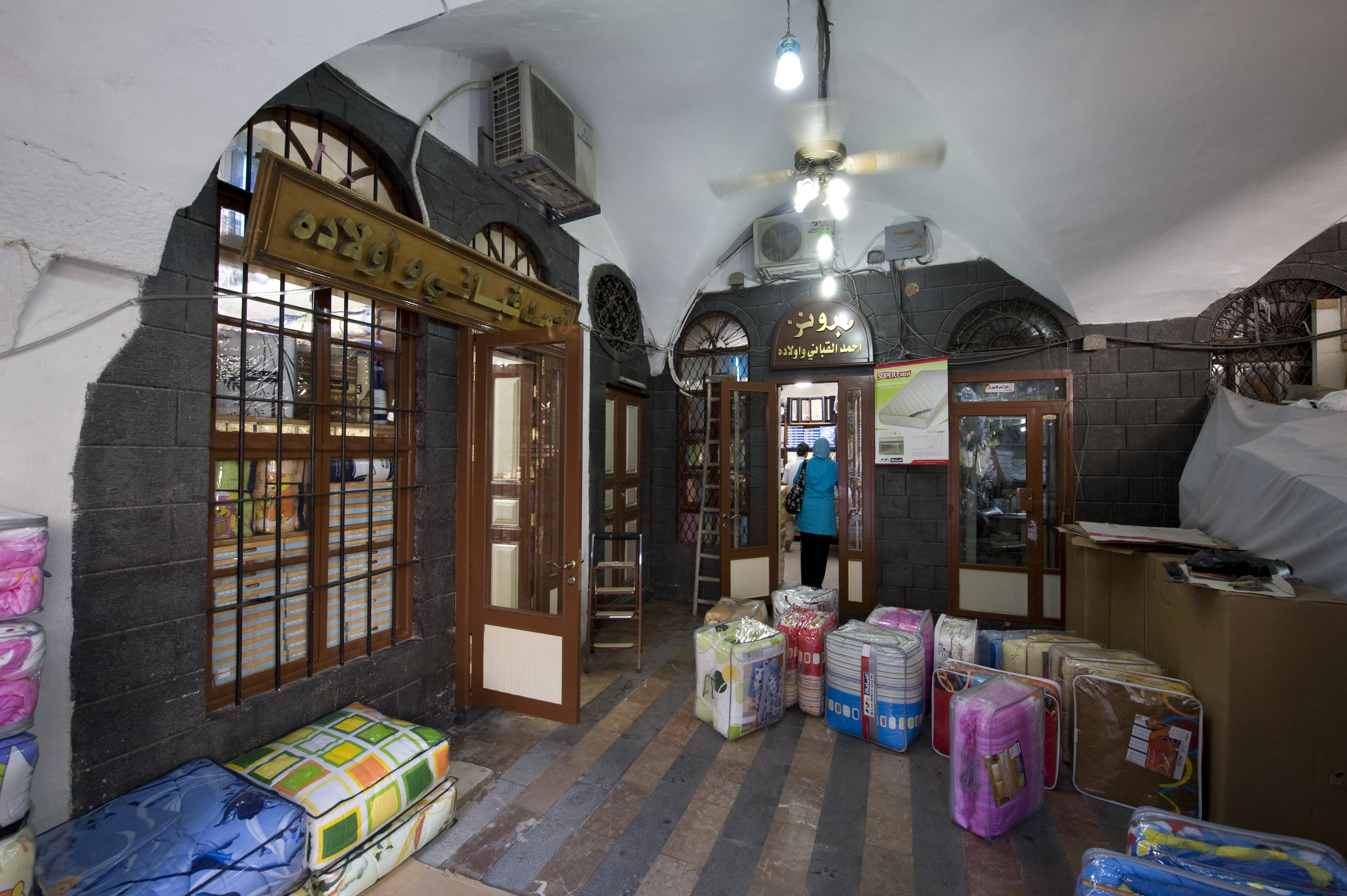

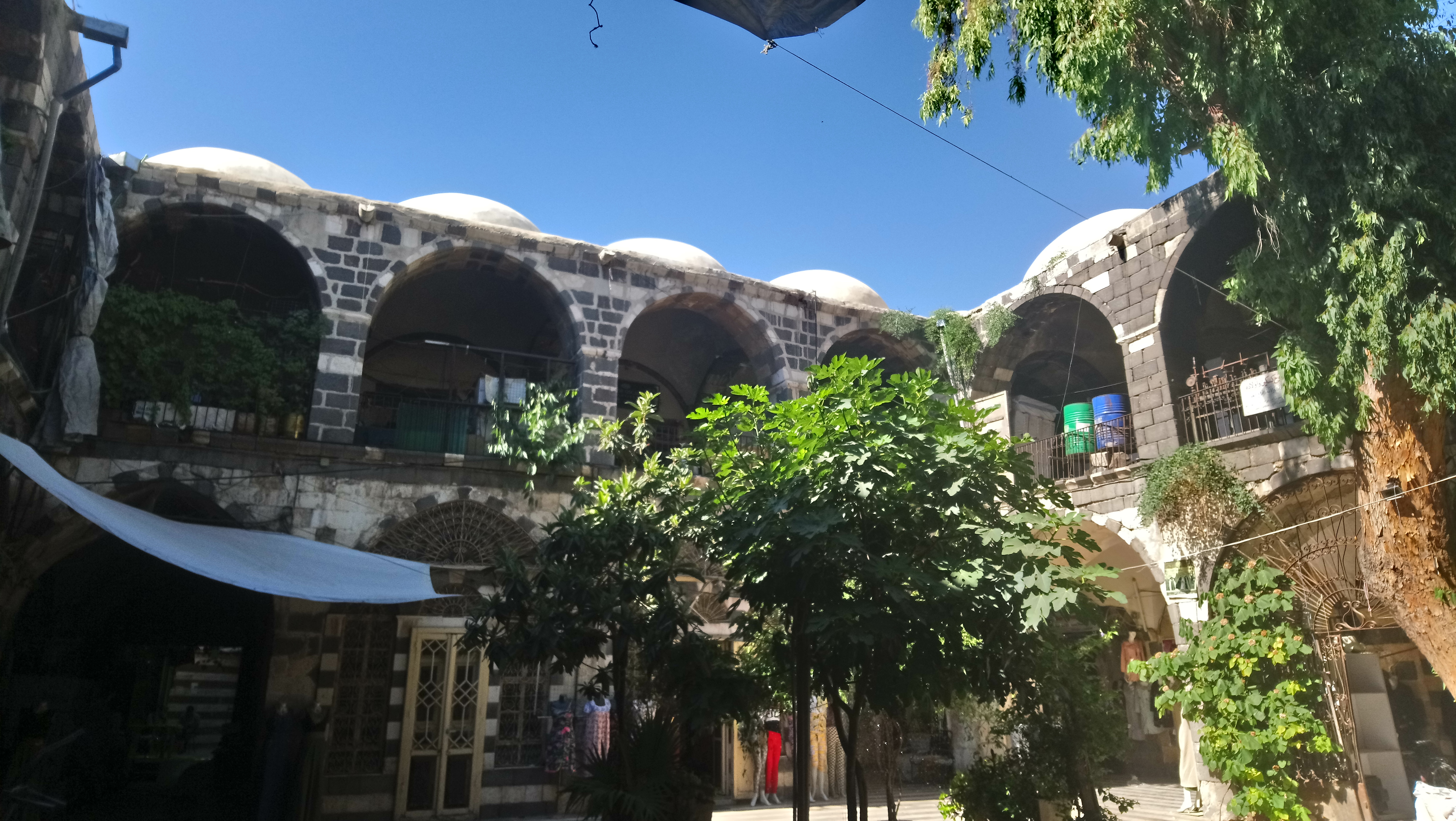
Khan Jaqmaq, characterized by its arcaded domes

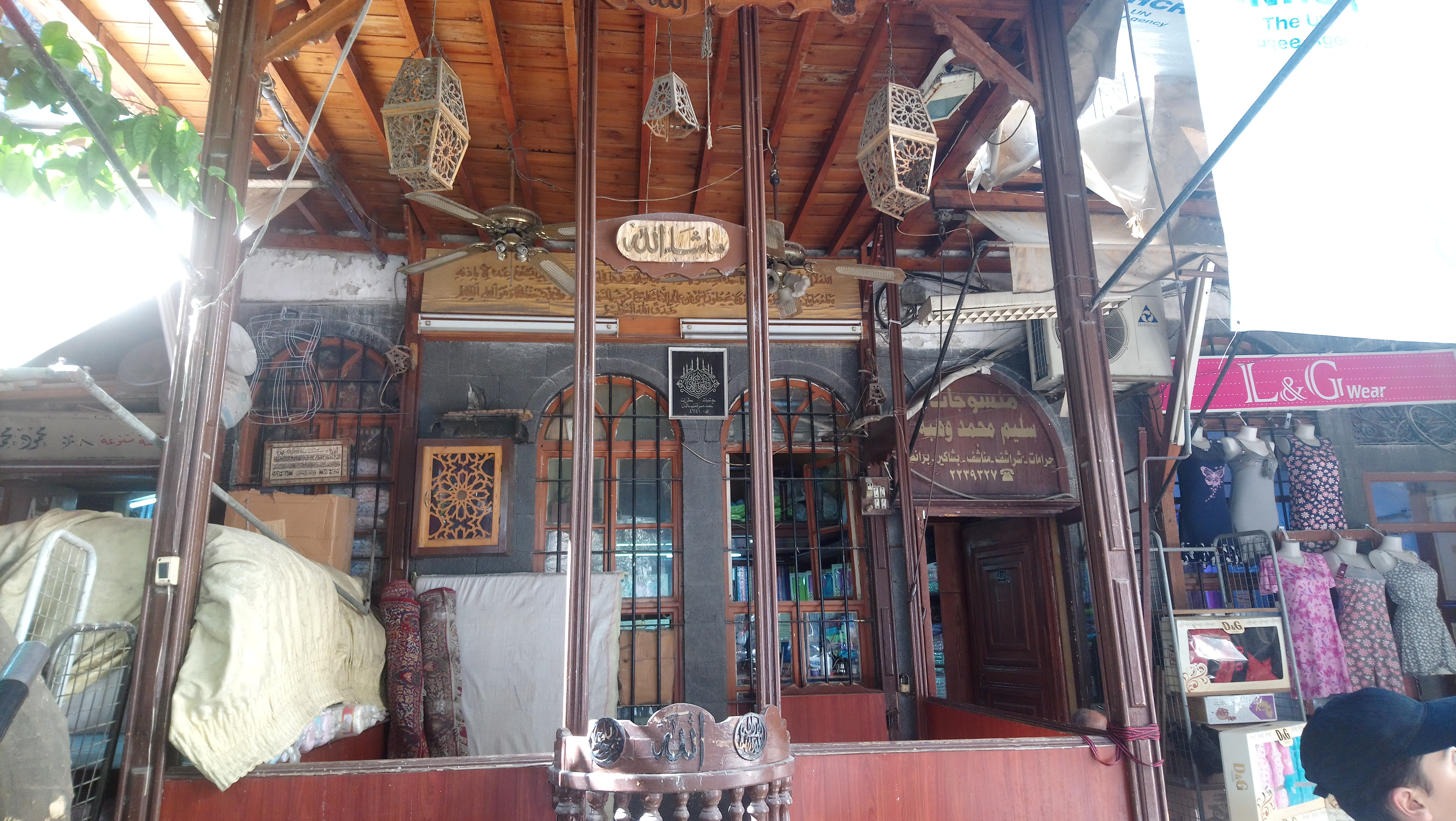
Khan Jaqmaq featuring a traditional market

== See also ==
- Khan As'ad Pasha
- Khan Sulayman Pasha
- Khan Tuman
