= Khan Sulayman Pasha =

Khan Sulayman Pasha Al-Azem
- خَان سُلَيْمَان بَاشَا العَظْم
- Alternative names: Khan al-Hamasina

General information
- Type: Hotel (former Caravanserai)
- Architectural style: Ottoman
- Location: Damascus, Syria, Al-Buzuriyah Souq
- Coordinates: 33°30′30.25″N 36°18′20.5″E
- Construction started: 1732
- Completed: 1736
- Client: Sulayman Pasha al-Azm

Technical details
- Floor count: 2

Khan Sulayman Pasha (Arabic: خَان سُلَيْمَان بَاشَا العَظْم, romanized: Khān Sulaymān Bāşā al-ʿAẓem) is a large hotel (formerly an urban caravanserai) in the Old City of Damascus. The site underwent renovation in 2025 and was subsequently converted into a hotel operated by the Wahoud Group for several years.[2]

== See also ==
- Azm Palace
- Khan As'ad Pasha
- Khan Jaqmaq
- Khan Tuman
