= Midhat Pasha Souq =

Market in Damascus, Syria

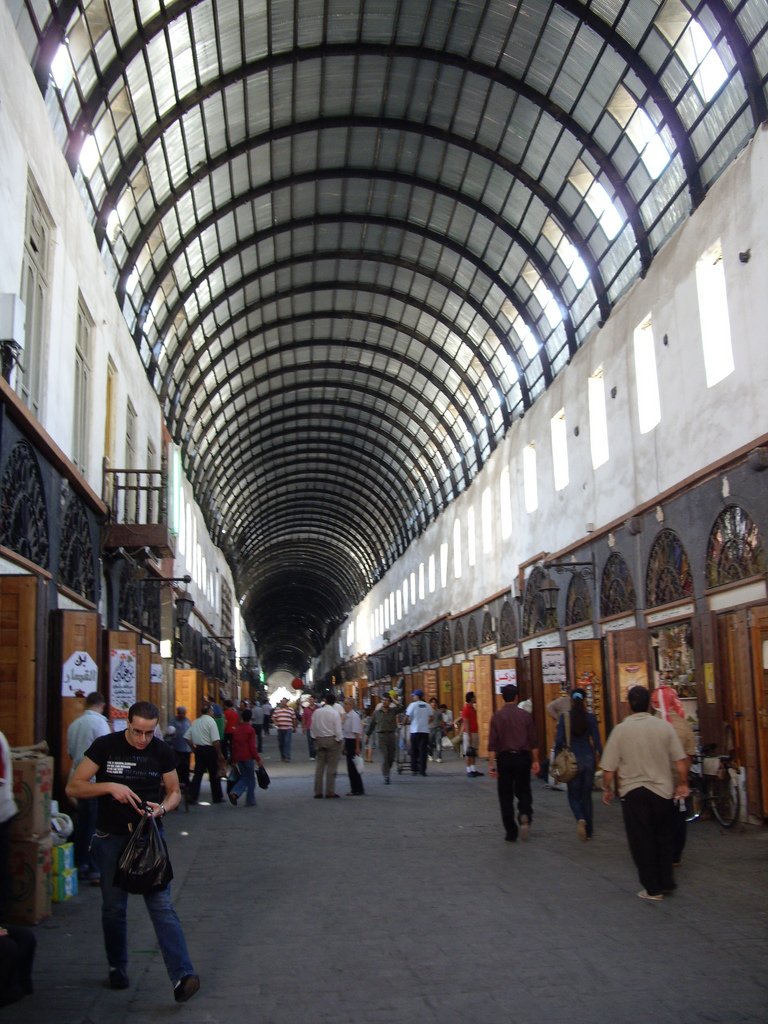
- Interactive map of Midhat Pasha Souq
- Native name: سُوق مِدْحَت بَاشَا (Arabic)
- Former name: Street Called Straight
- Length: 490 m (1,610 ft)
- Location: Damascus, Syria
- Coordinates: 33°30′31.25″N 36°18′20.5″E

Midhat Pasha Souq (Arabic: سُوق مِدْحَت بَاشَا, romanized: Sūq Midḥat Bāšā) also called Al-Taweel Souq (Arabic: سُوق الطَّوِيل, romanized: Sūq aṭ-Ṭawīl, english: Long Market) is a historically important souq which forms the western fraction of the Street Called Straight in Damascus, Syria.

== History ==
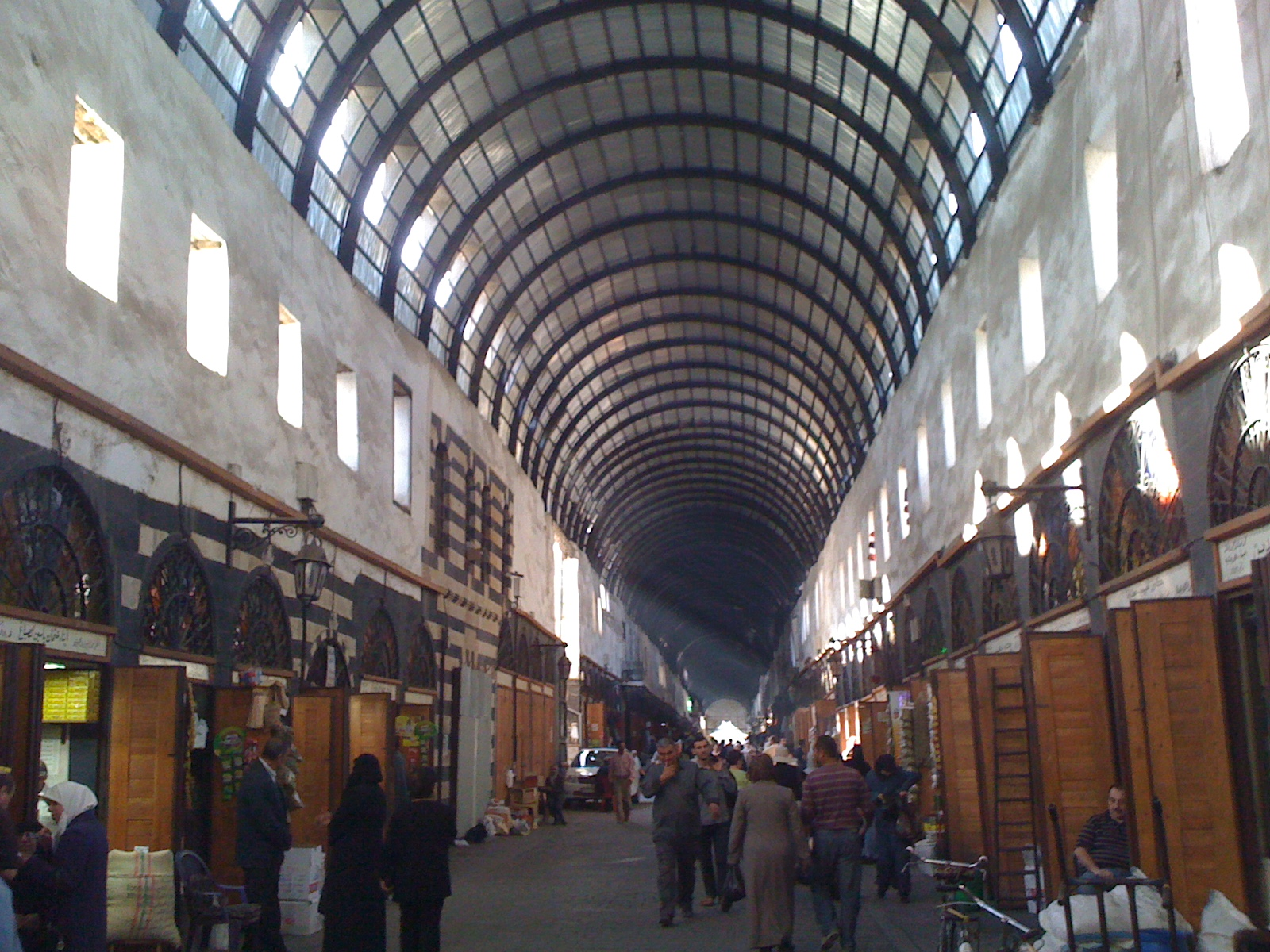
Midhat Pasha Souq in 2010

Souq Midhat Pasha is the oldest inhabited street in the world. It was built after 64 BC during the Roman Empire as a Street of Pillars.

In 1878, during the Ottoman rule over Syria, it was named after Midhat Pasha.

In their 1898 work "Palestine and Syria: Handbook for Travellers", Orientalists Albert Socin and Immanuel Benzinger described the souq on their visit to Damascus; they noted sellers of rice, lentils, sugar, paper, coffee, among other wares. They also noted a "Silk Bazaar", where shops offered keffiyehs with varying sizes and colors, as well as silk clothing items imported from Lebanon.

During the Syrian Civil War, some demonstrations have taken place here.

== See also ==
- Al-Buzuriyah Souq
- Al-Hamidiyah Souq
- Bazaar
- Bazaari
- Market (place)
- Retail
- Souq
