= Straight Street =

Main Roman road of Damascus, Syria

Coordinates: 33°30′33″N 36°18′41″E

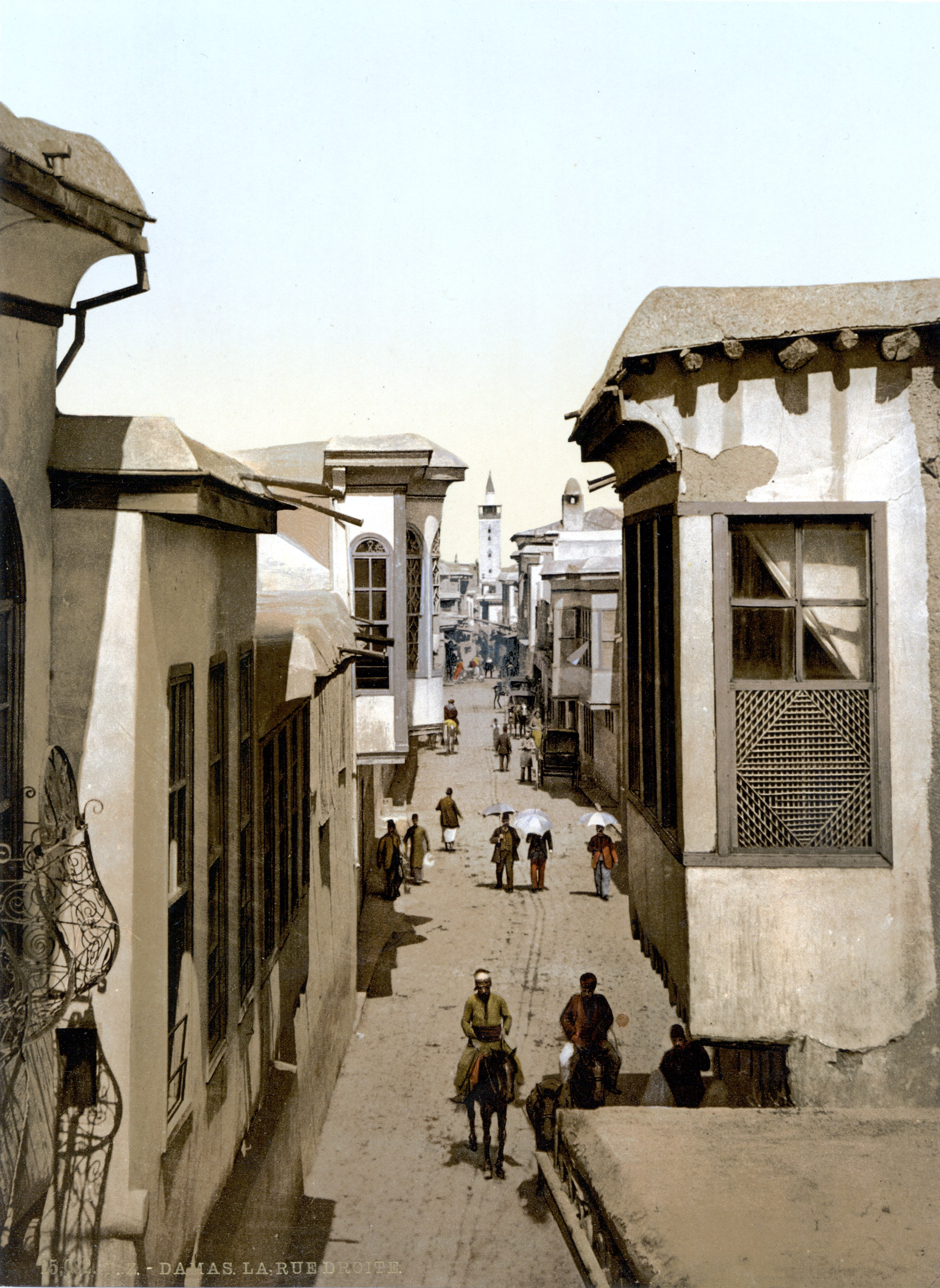
Straight Street c. 1900

Straight Street (Arabic: الشارع المستقيم) is the old decumanus maximus, the main east–west Roman road, of Damascus, Syria. It runs from east to west through the old city. It was originally built during the Seleucid period. According to the Acts of the Apostles (9:11) in the New Testament of the Christian Bible, Paul the Apostle stayed in a house on Straight Street.

The western half of the street, including the Midhat Pasha Souq, is today also known as "Midhat Pasha Street", while the eastern half, leading to the Bab Sharqi gate, is known as "Bab Sharqi Street".

== History ==
During the Greek period in Damascus, the city was re-designed by Hippodamus, who gave the city a grid structure. The redesign created a grid structure, including the creation of the 1,500 metre-long street, Straight Street. It was designed to be the longest street during its construction.

The Mariamite Cathedral of Damascus was built on Straight Street in the 2nd century, and has been rebuilt multiple times since then. It currently serves as the seat of the Antiochian Orthodox Church. The western half of the street, including the Midhat Pasha Souq, is now named "Midhat Pasha Street", while the eastern half, leading to the Bab Sharqi gate is named "Bab Sharqi Street".

According to the King James Version of the English Bible:

And the Lord said unto him (i.e. Ananias), Arise, and go into the street which is called Straight, and inquire in the house of Judas for one called Saul, of Tarsus: for, behold, he prayeth.

== Gallery ==
Straight Street (1903)

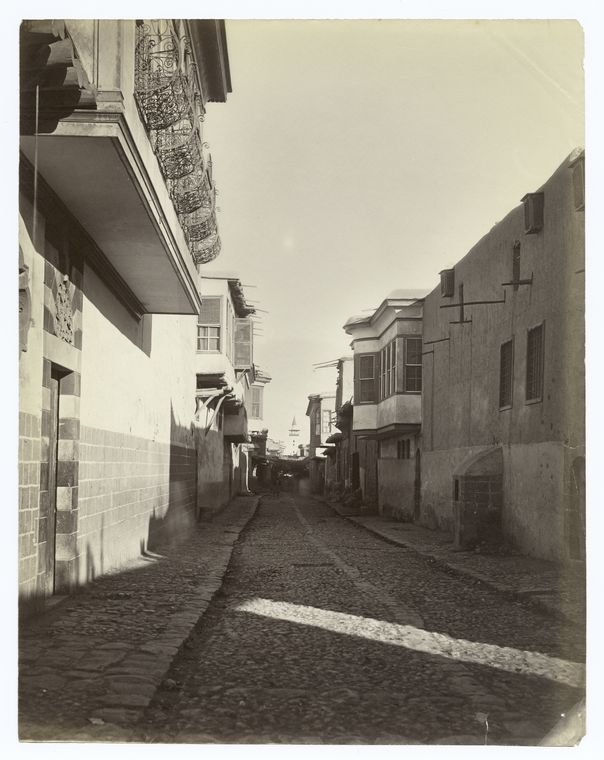
The Straight Street, 1860s–1920s

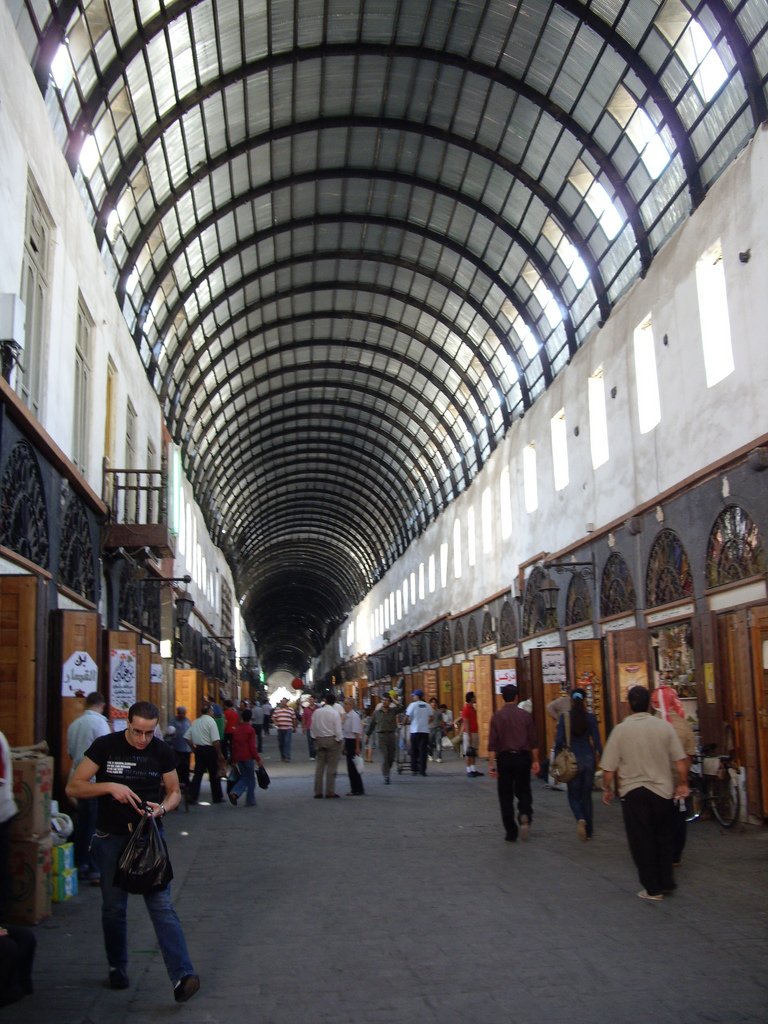
Midhat Pasha Souq

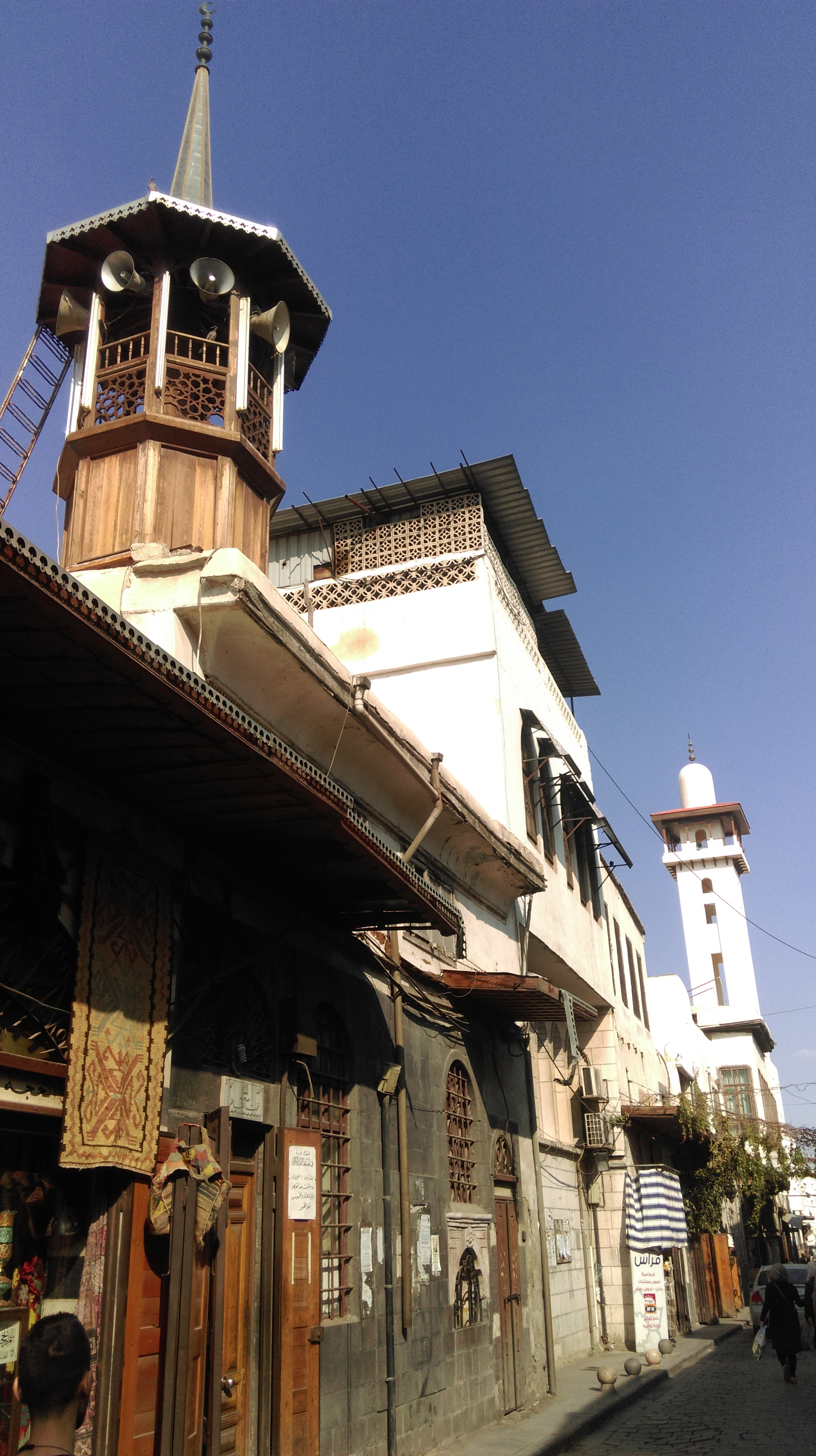
Midhat Pasha Street

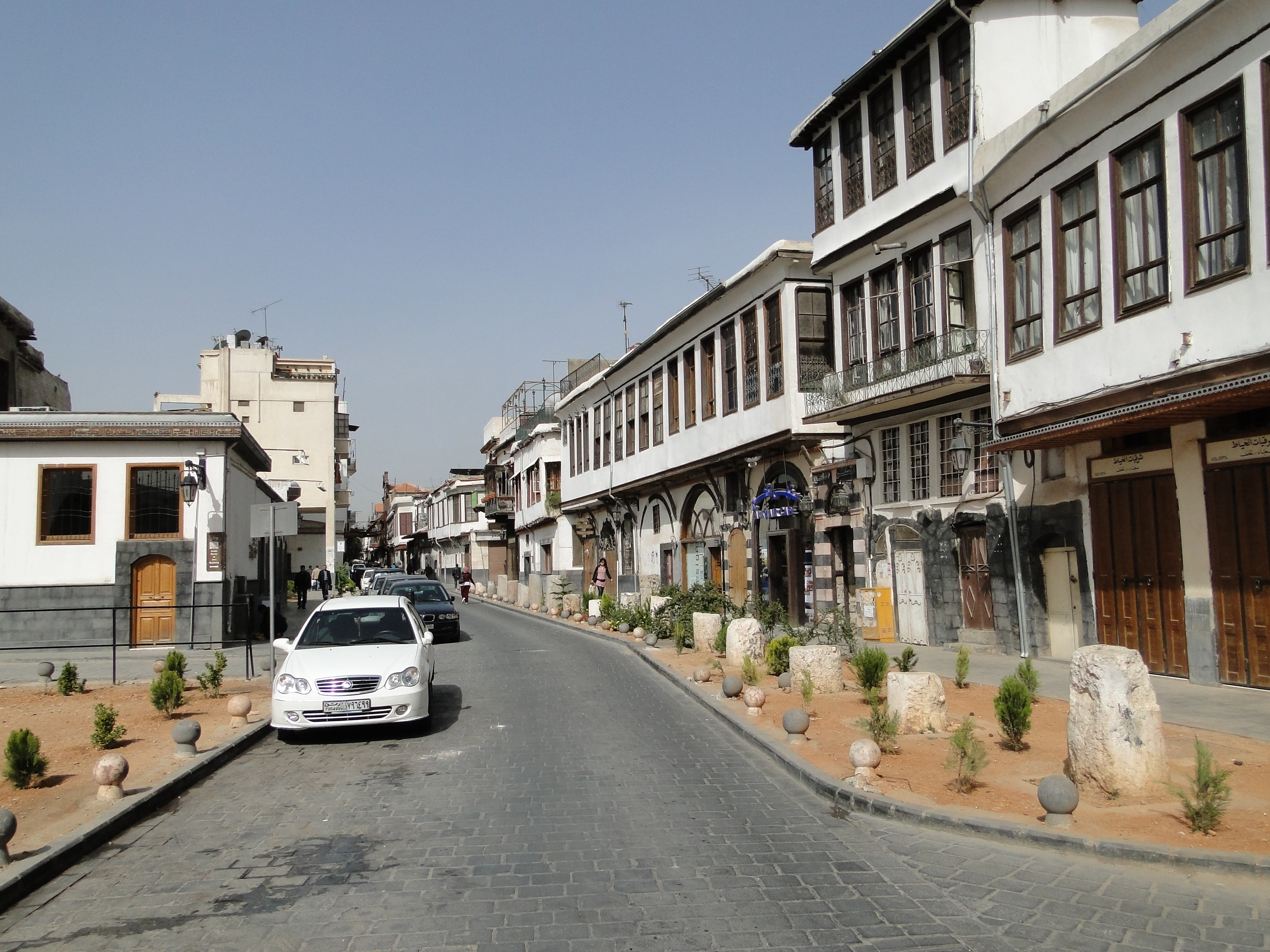
Bab Sharqi Street

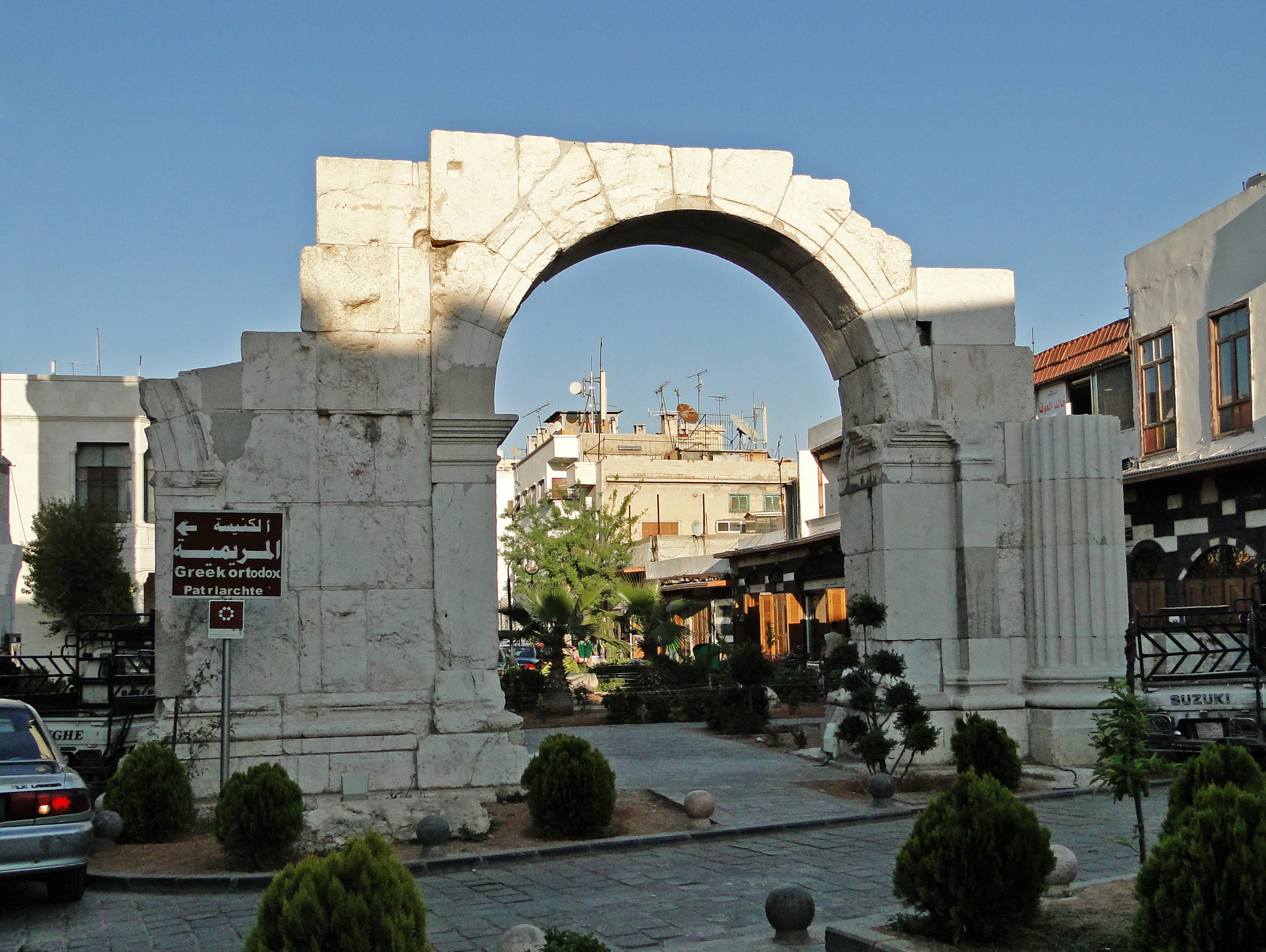
Roman triumphal arch on Damascus Straight Street

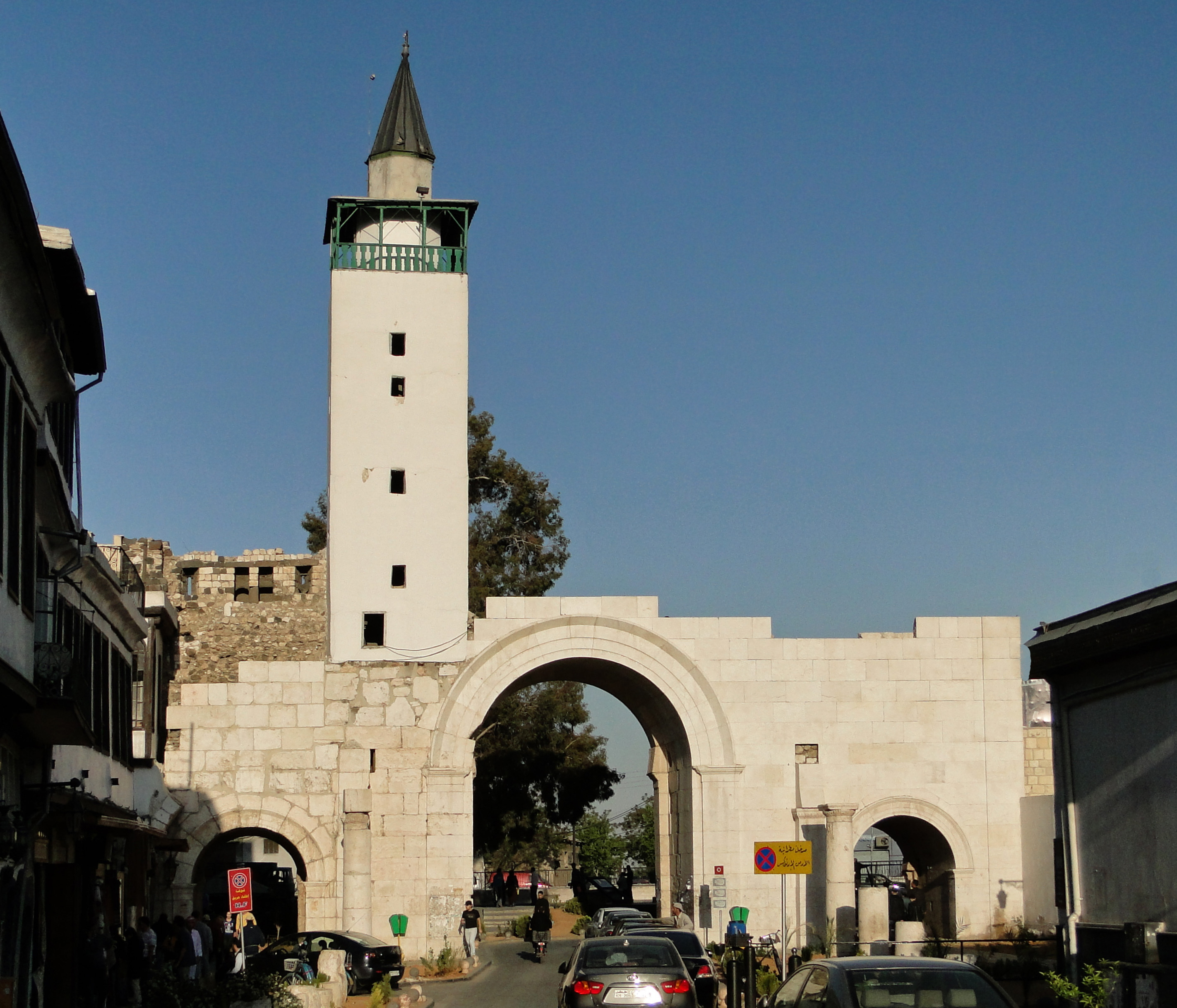
Bab Sharqi
