= Khan Tuman (building) =

Caravanserai in Aleppo, Syria

- خان طومان
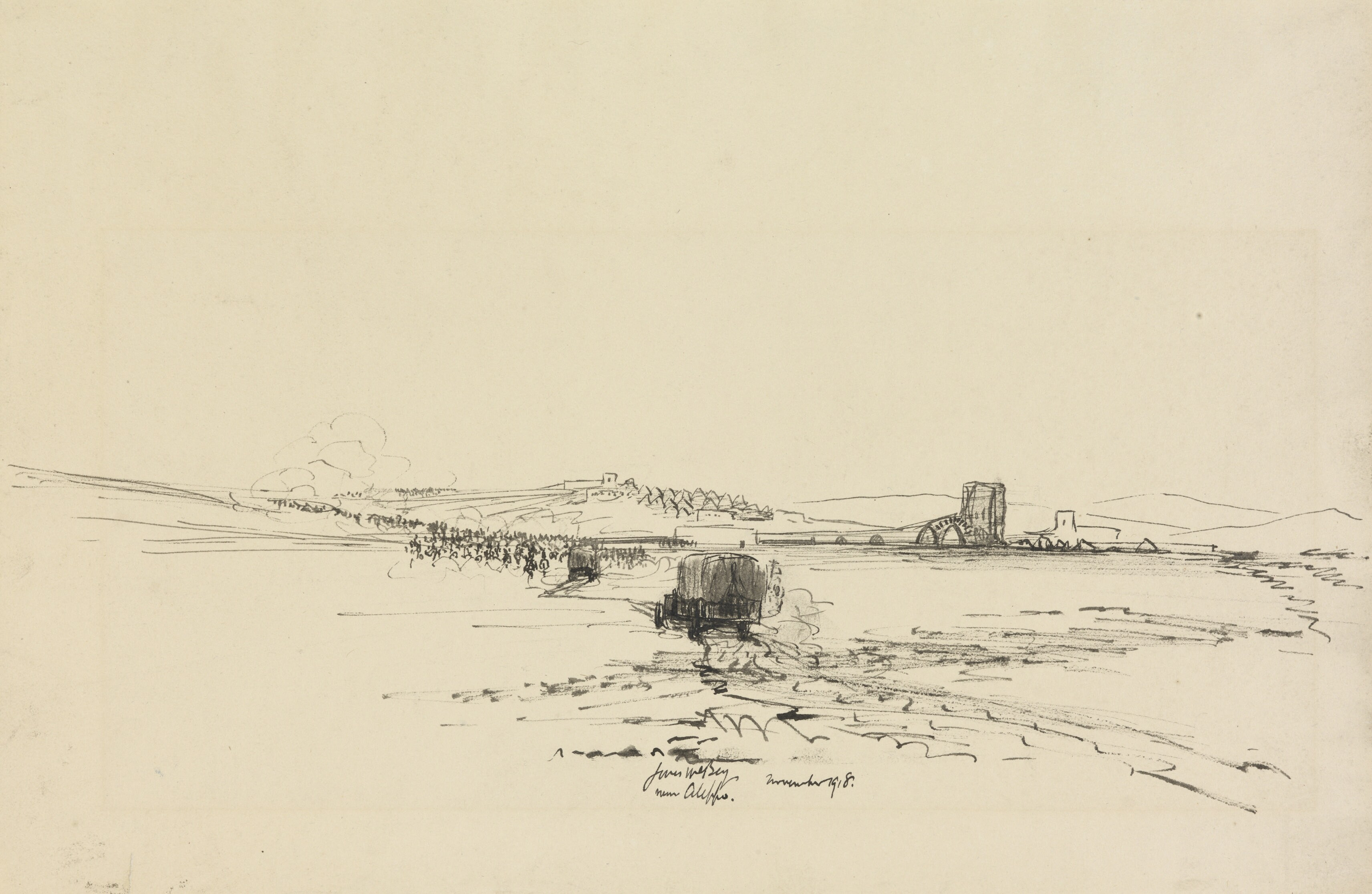
- Interactive map of the Khan Tuman area

General information
- Type: Caravanserai
- Architectural style: Ayyubid, Mamluk, Ottoman
- Location: Khan Tuman, Aleppo Governorate, Syria
- Coordinates: 36°7′3″N 37°3′3″E
- Completed: Original Khan: 1189; Mamluk sections: 1478; Ottoman sections: 1652
- Demolished: Parts of the khan were demolished in 1970 to accommodate the Latakia-Aleppo railroad
- Client: Emir Tuman Nuri; Sultan Qaitbey; Ipshir Pasha

Khan Tuman (Arabic: خان طومان) is a large 12th-century khan in Syria.

== See also ==
- Khan Jaqmaq
- Khan As'ad Pasha
- Khan Sulayman Pasha
