= Khan As'ad Pasha =

Ottoman-era caravanserai in Damascus, Syria

Coordinates: 33°30′33″N 36°18′24″E

- خَان أَسْعَد بَاشَا
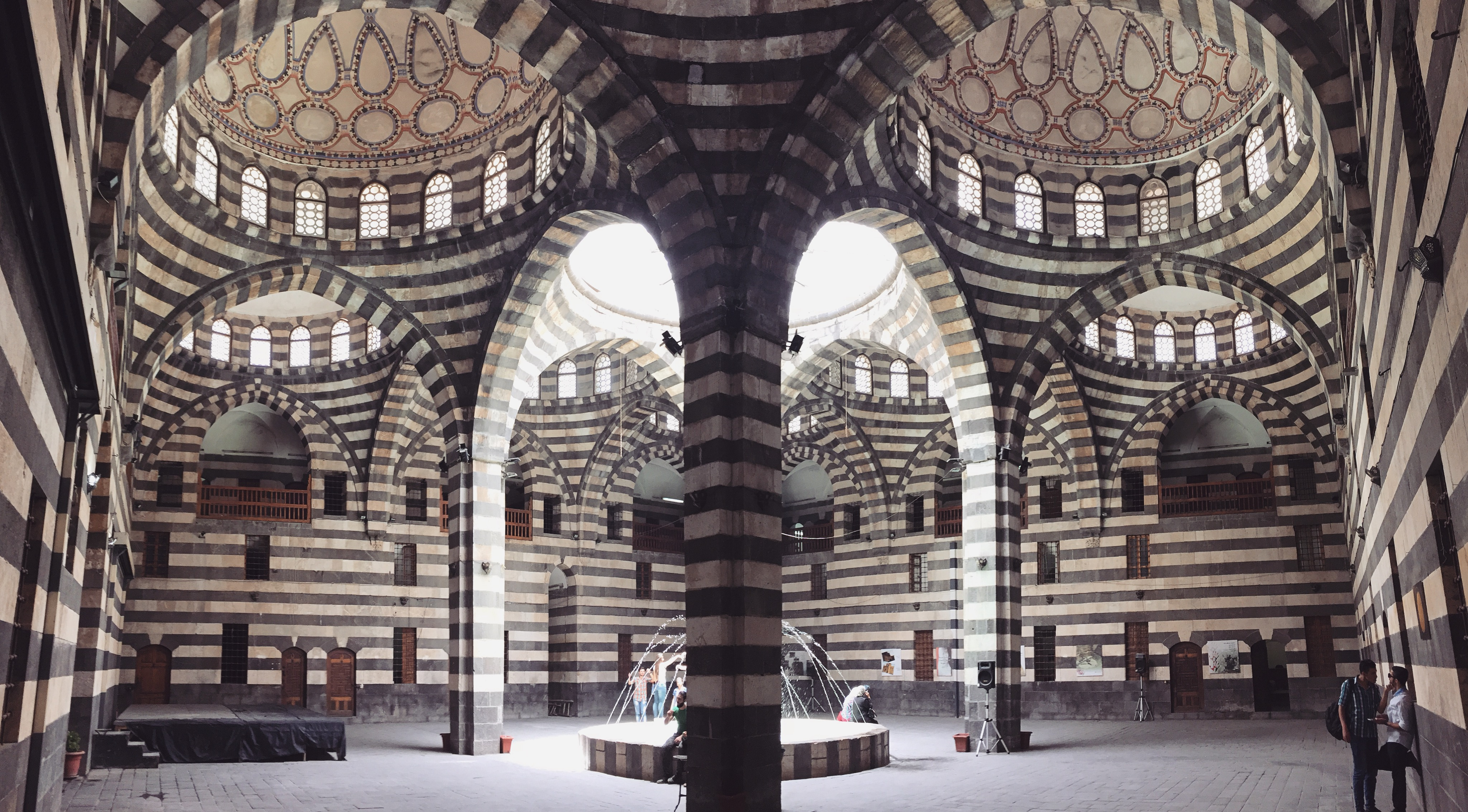
- Alternative names: As'ad Pasha al-Azm Khan

General information
- Type: Caravanserai, museum
- Architectural style: Damascene, Ottoman
- Location: Damascus, Syria, Al-Buzuriyah Souq
- Construction started: 1751
- Completed: 1752
- Renovated: 1990s
- Client: As'ad Pasha al-'Azm

Technical details
- Floor count: 2
- Floor area: 2,500 square metres (27,000 sq ft)

Renovating team
- Awards: Aga Khan Award for Architecture

Khan As'ad Pasha (Arabic: خَان أَسْعَد بَاشَا, romanized: Khān ʾAsʿad Bāşā) is the largest caravanserai (khān) in the Old City of Damascus, covering an area of 2,500 square metres (27,000 sq ft). Situated along Al-Buzuriyah Souq, it was built and named after As'ad Pasha al-Azm, the governor of Damascus, in 1751–52. Khan As'ad Pasha has been described as one of the finest khans of Damascus, and the most "ambitious" work of architecture in the city.

== Usage ==
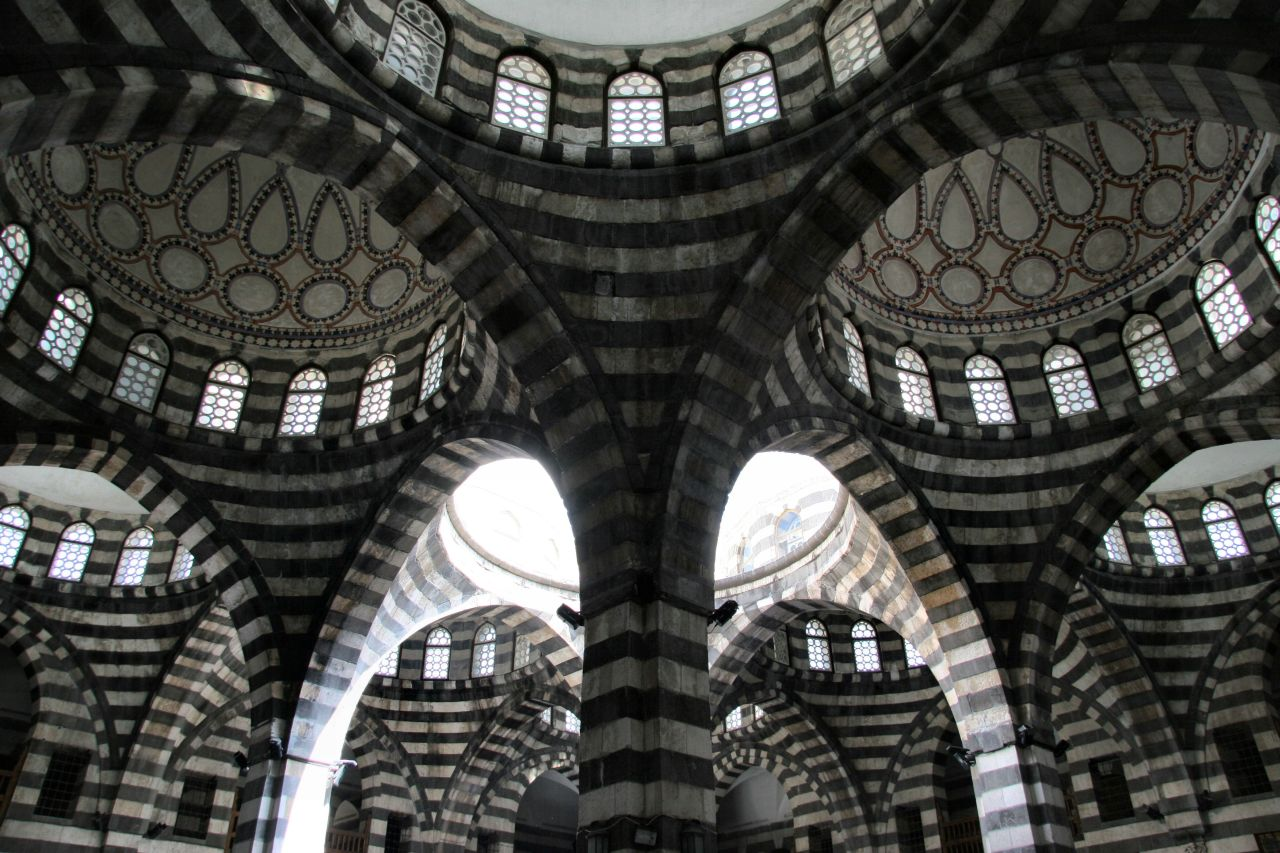
Arched ablaq dome

Throughout the Ottoman era, it hosted caravans coming from Baghdad, Mosul, Aleppo, Beirut and elsewhere in the Middle East. Rooms were rented to notable merchants of the time.

== Architecture ==
The design of the khan included eight small domes and one large central opening reminiscent of Persian architecture, while the eight domes reflect Shia tradition. The covered courtyard features a high ceiling which helped provide protection from the climate during the hot summer and cold winter seasons.

The restoration of the khān won the Aga Khan Award for Architecture.

== Gallery ==
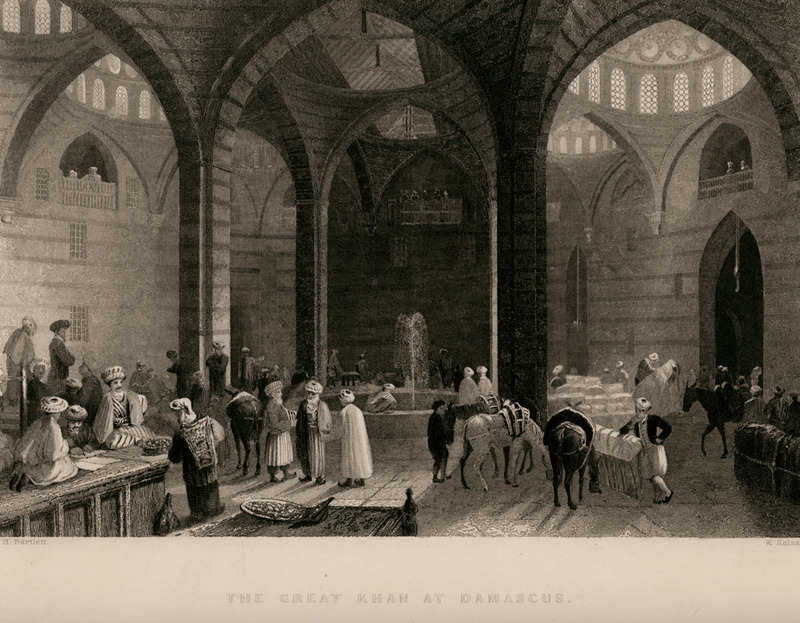
The khān, 1836

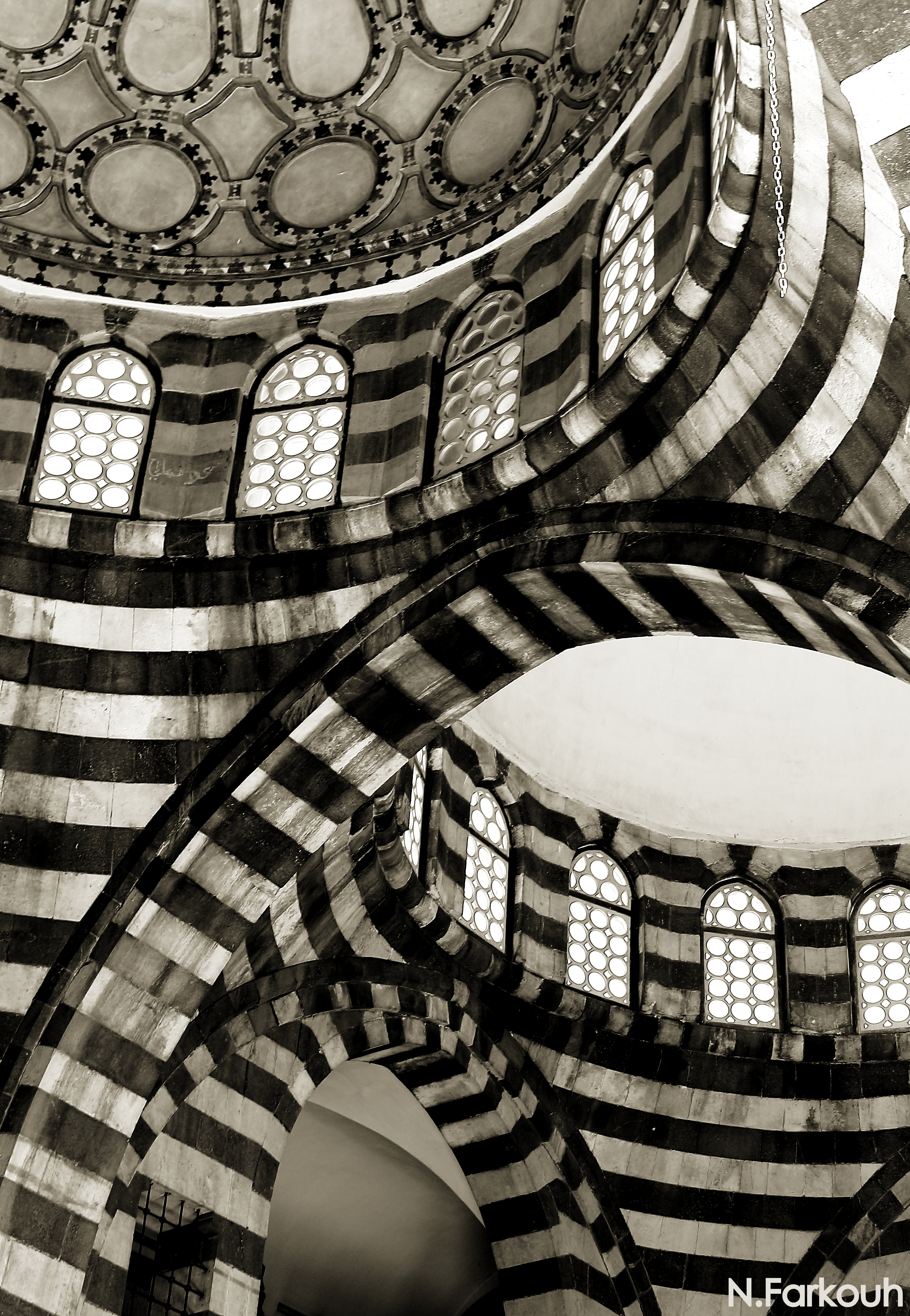
A pendentive

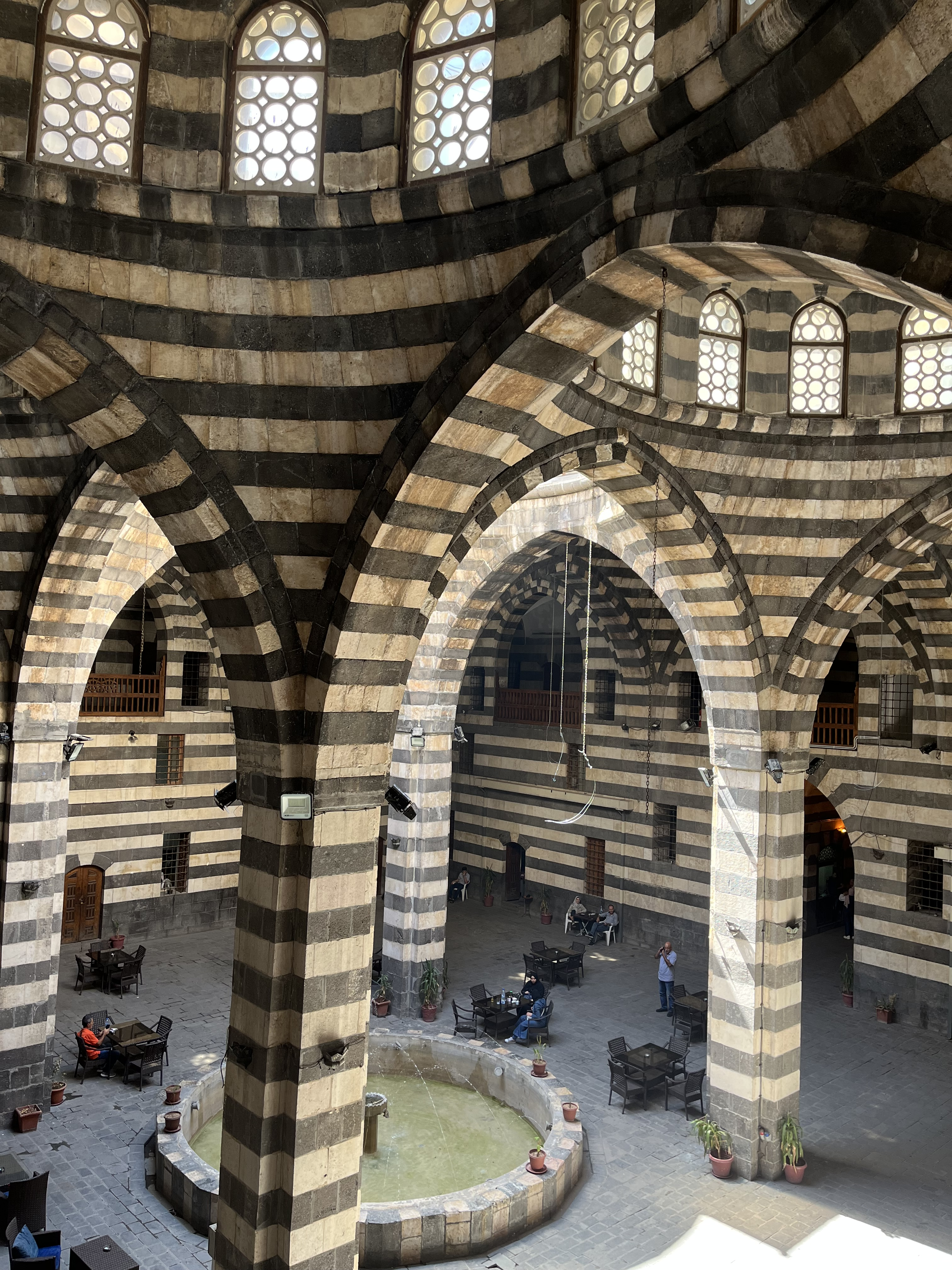
Interior courtyard

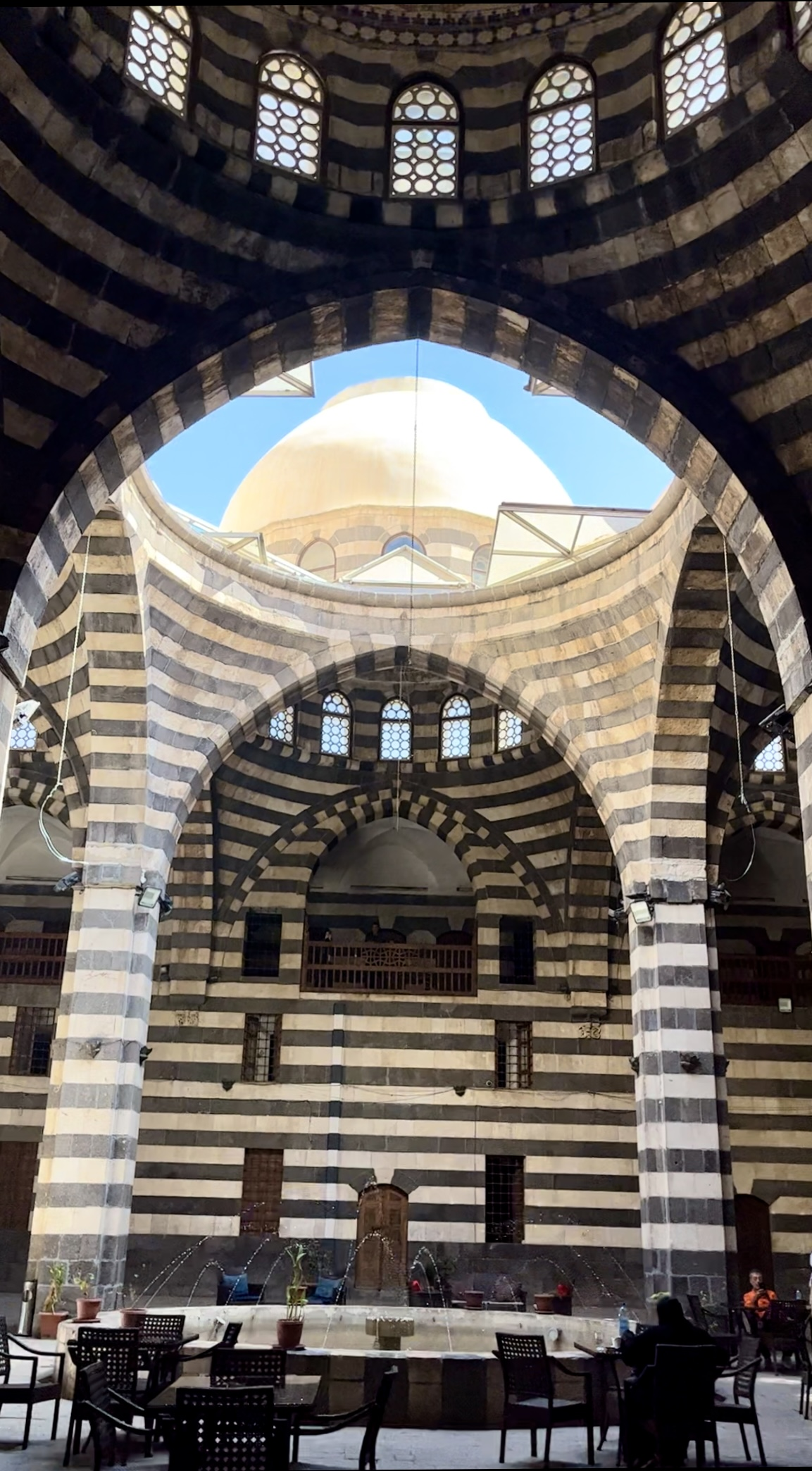

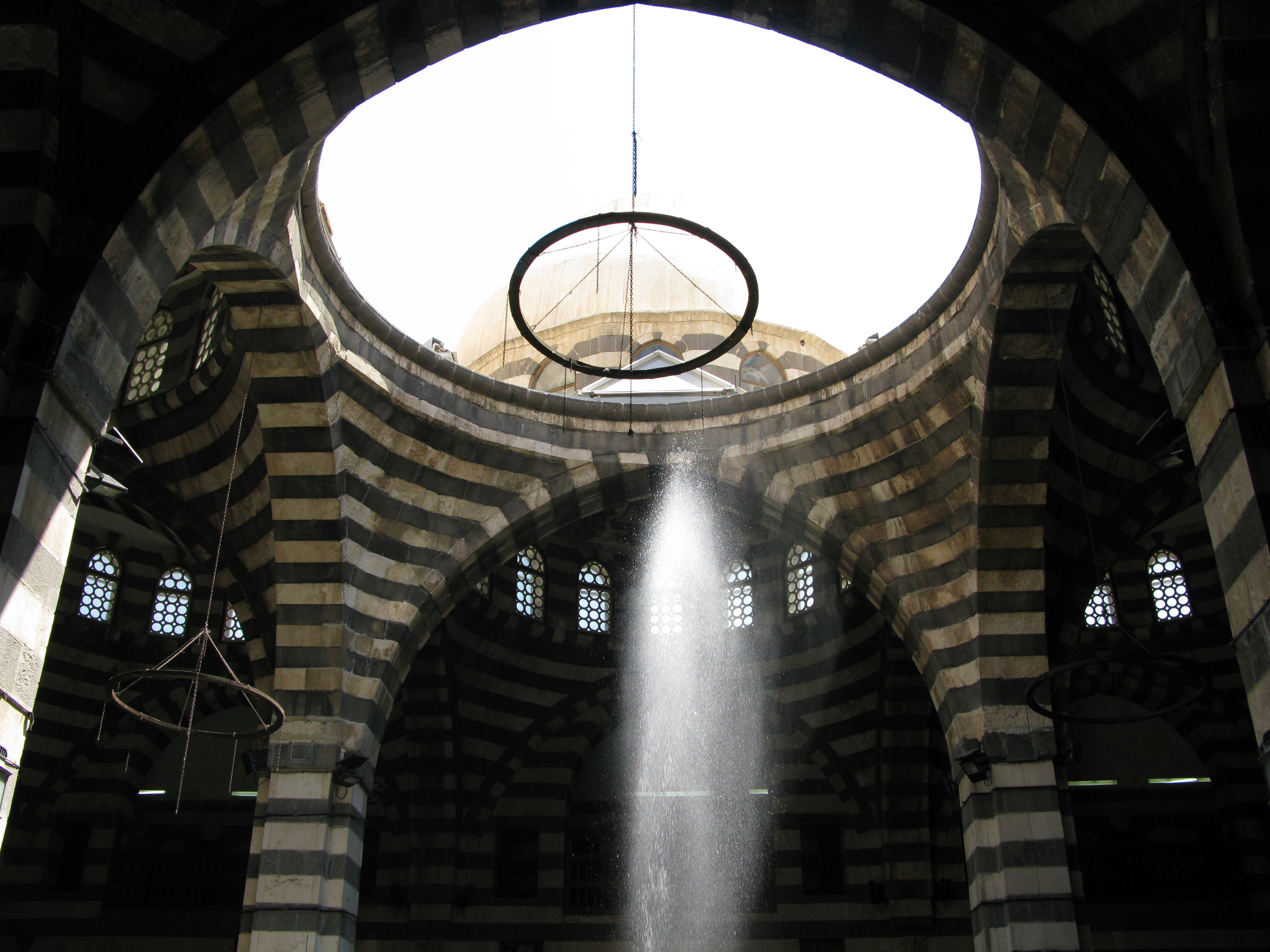
Arches

== See also ==
- Al-Azm Palace
- Jaqmaq Caravansarai
- Sulayman Pasha Caravansarai
- Tuman Caravansarai

== Bibliography ==
- Baedeker, K. (1906). Palestine and Syria: Handbook for Travellers. Baedeker.
- Carter, Terry; Dunston, Lara (2004). Syria & Lebanon. Lonely Planet.
- Hillenbrand, R. (2004). Islamic Architecture: Form, Function, and Meaning. Columbia University Press.
- Thomson, W.M. (1886). The Land and the Book: Or, Biblical Illustrations Drawn from the Manners and Customs, the Scenes and Scenery, of the Holy Land ... Harper & Brothers.
