= Al-Buzuriyah Souq =

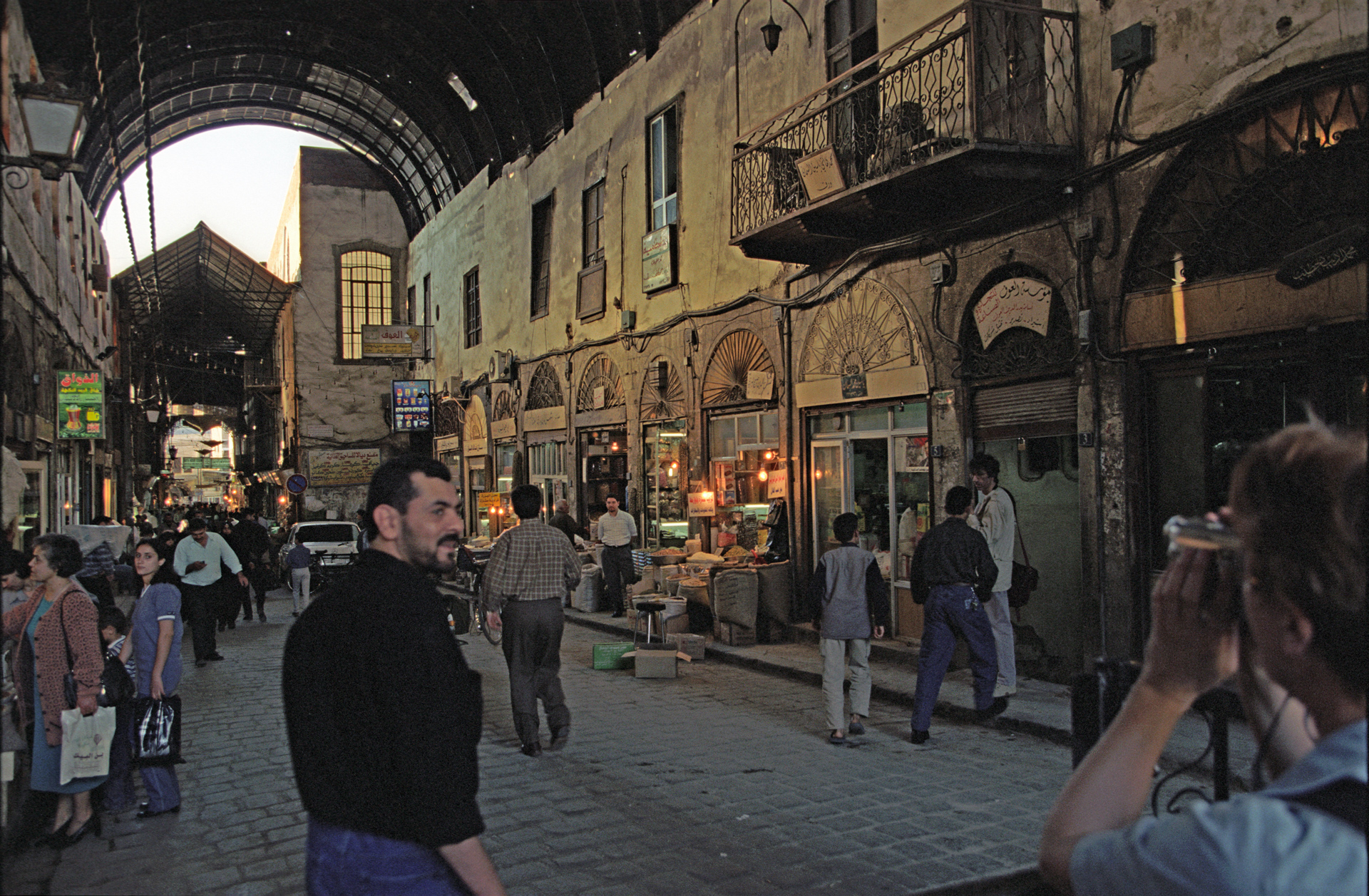
- Al-Buzuriyah Souq in 2001
- Interactive map of Al-Buzuriyah Souq
- Native name: سُوقُ ٱلْبُزُورِيَّةِ (Arabic)
- Length: 152 m (499 ft)
- Location: Damascus, Syria
- Coordinates: 33°30′34″N 36°18′22.5″E

Al-Buzuriyah Souq (Arabic: سُوقُ ٱلْبُزُورِيَّةِ, romanized: Sūq al-Buzūrīyah) is a historical souk located to the south of the Umayyad Mosque inside the old walled city of Damascus, Syria. The souk is famous for its spice vendors, and the many historical khans located along it, including Khan As'ad Pasha. On its southern end it meets Medhat Pasha Souq.

Perfumes and spices are sold on the market, as well as various types of sweets, products, dried fruit and soap (olive oil soap and the famous Syrian laurel soap).

== Gallery ==
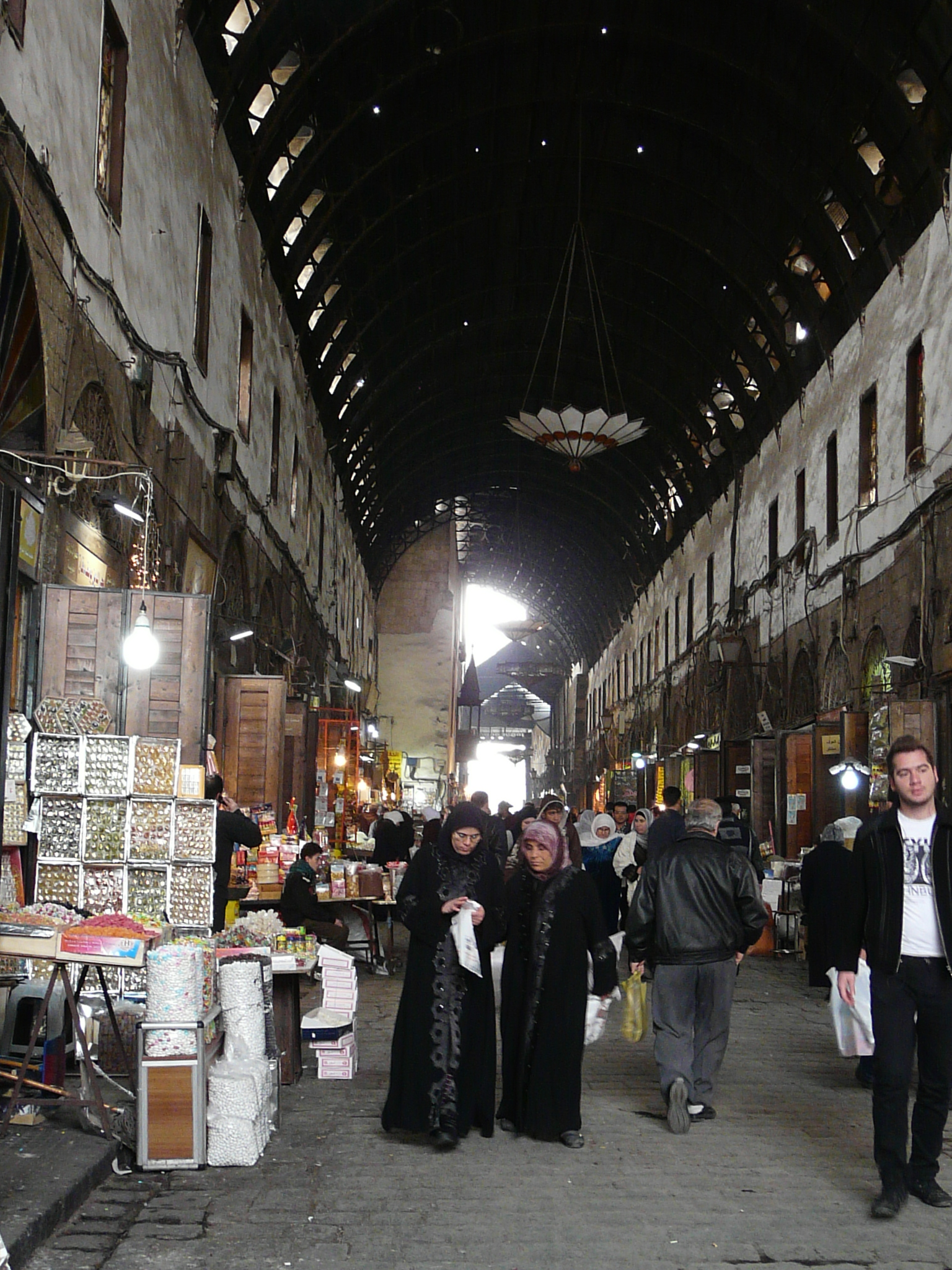
Souq Al-Buzuriyah in 2011

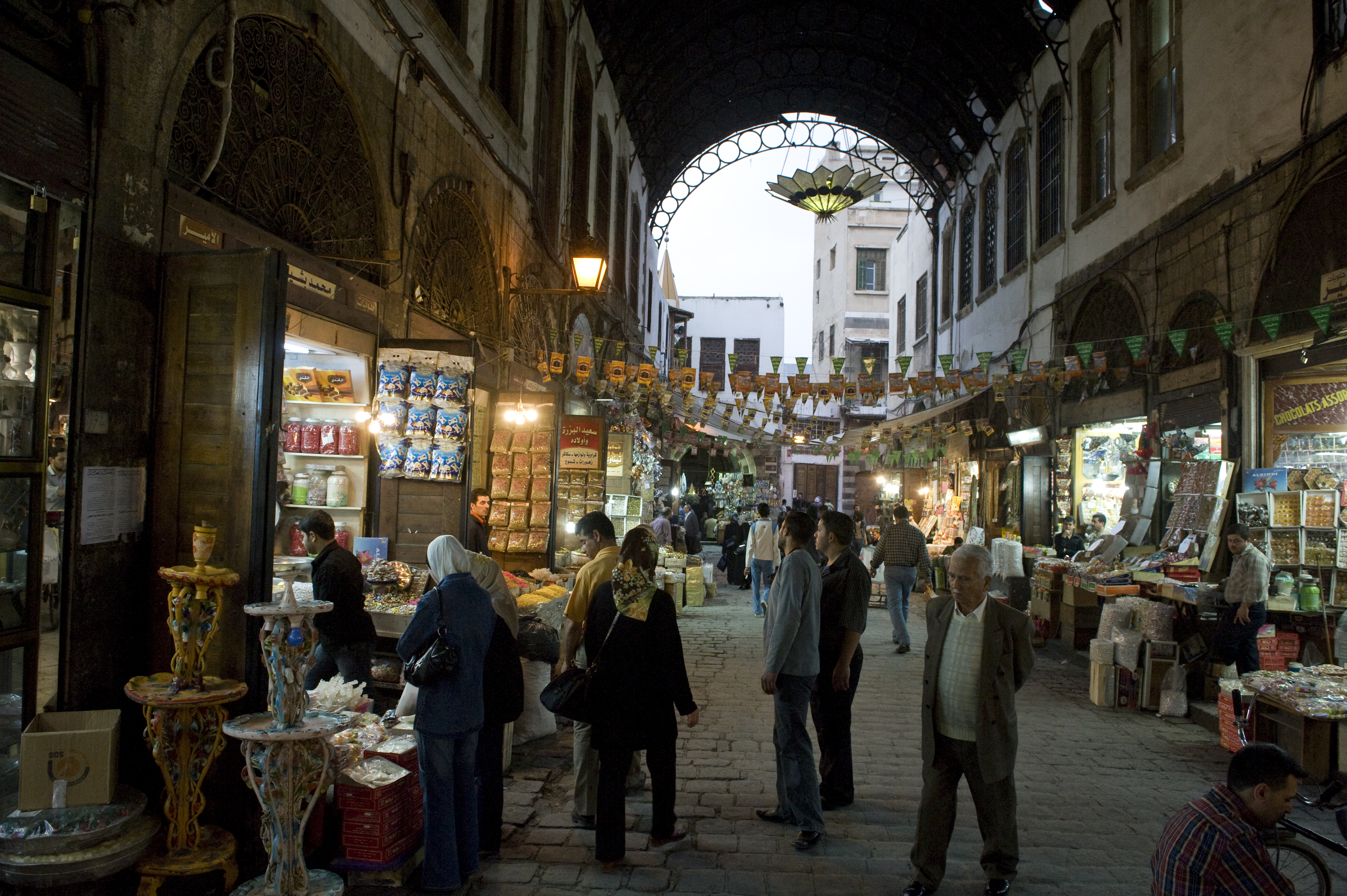
Souq Al-Buzuriyah in 2009

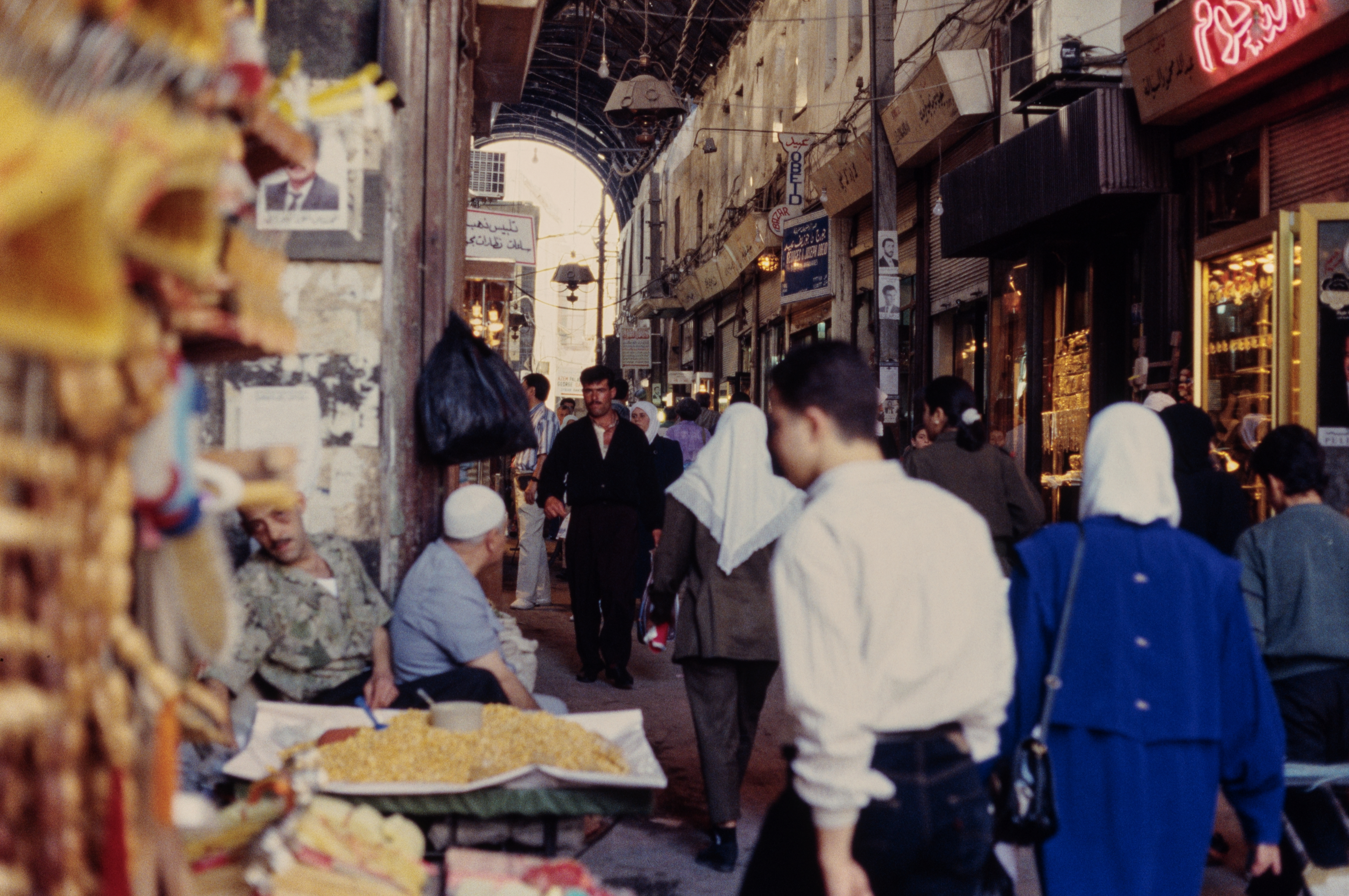
Souq Al-Buzuriyah in 1995

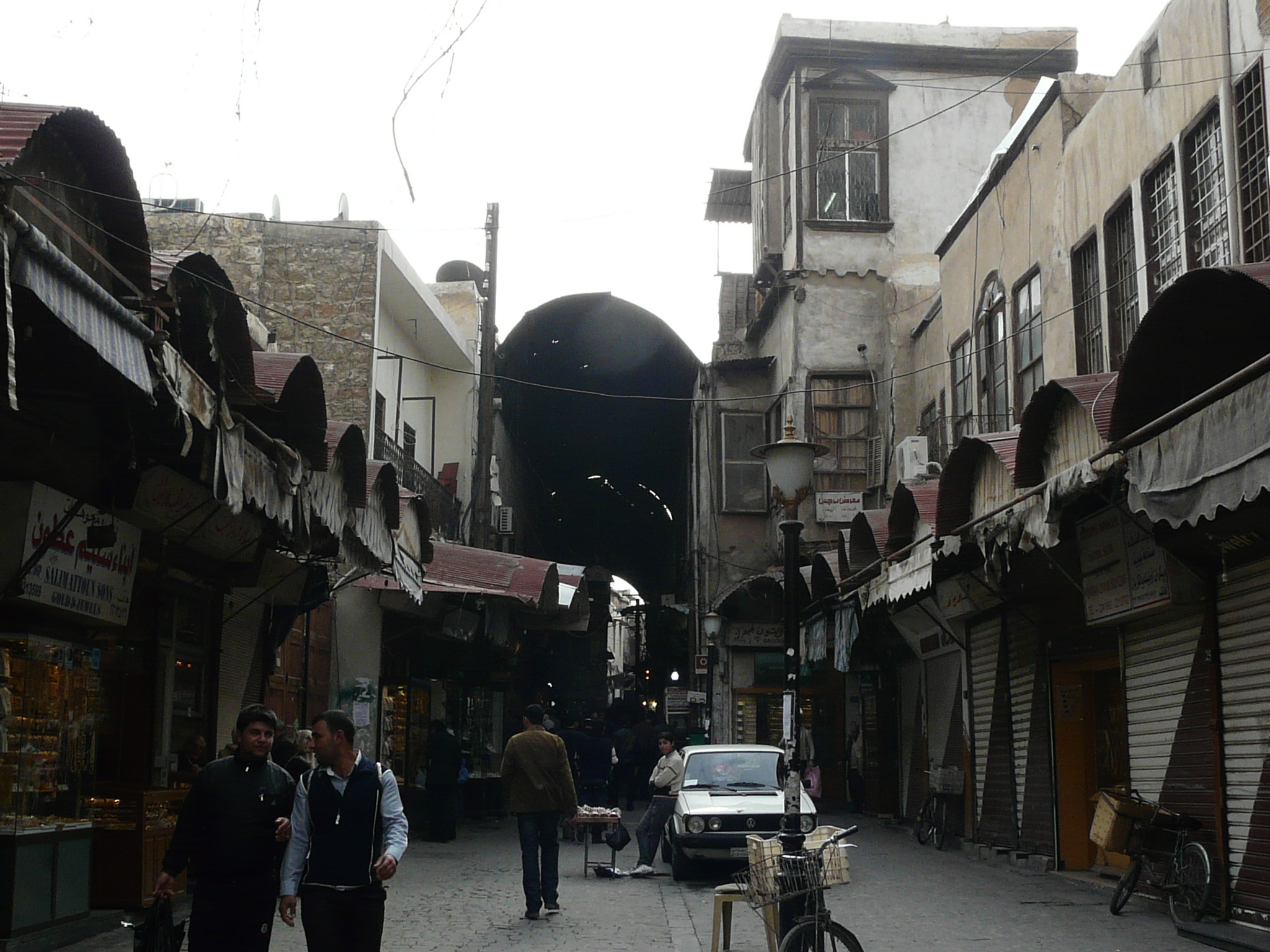
Souq from the outside

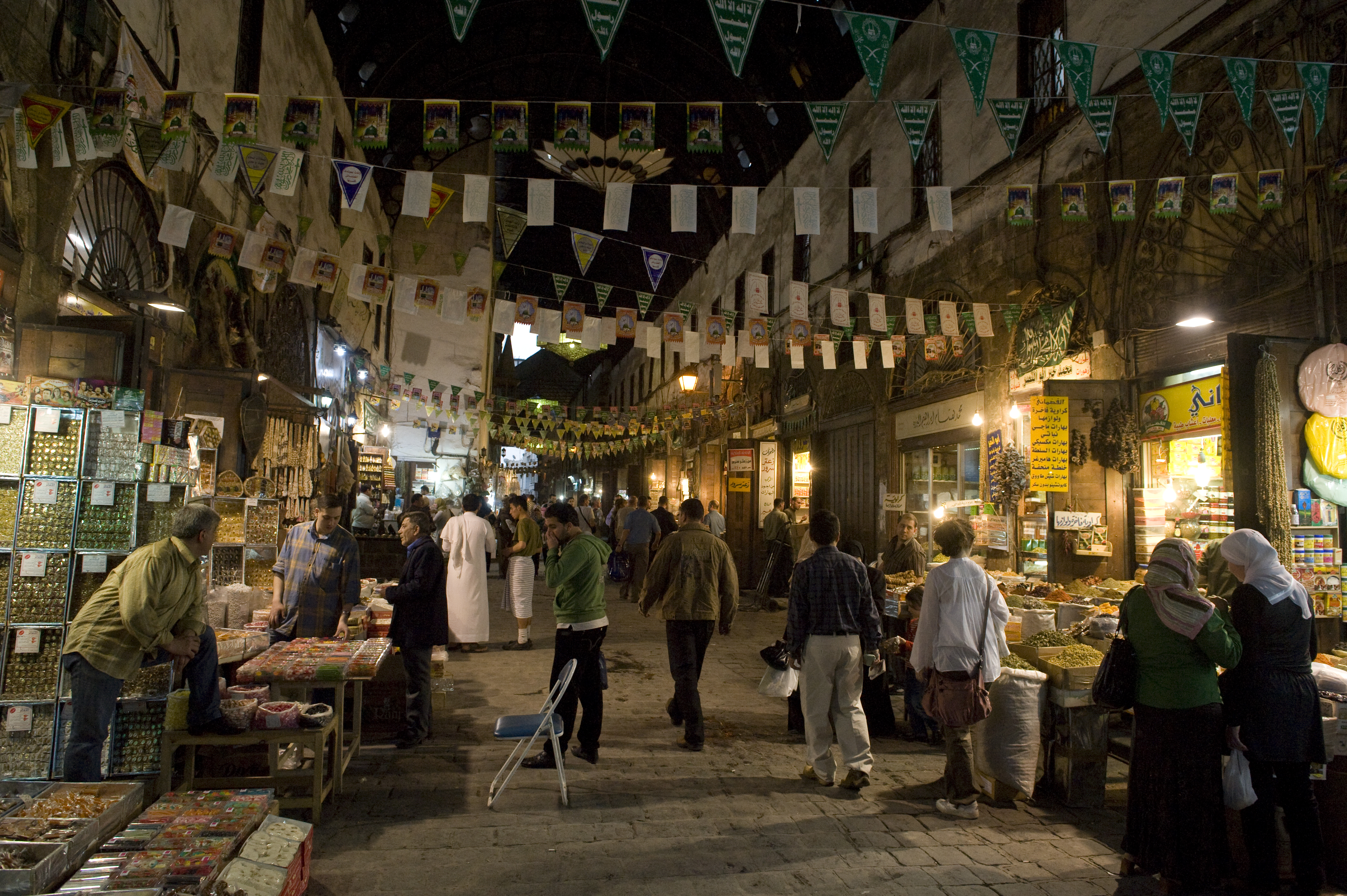
Souq at night

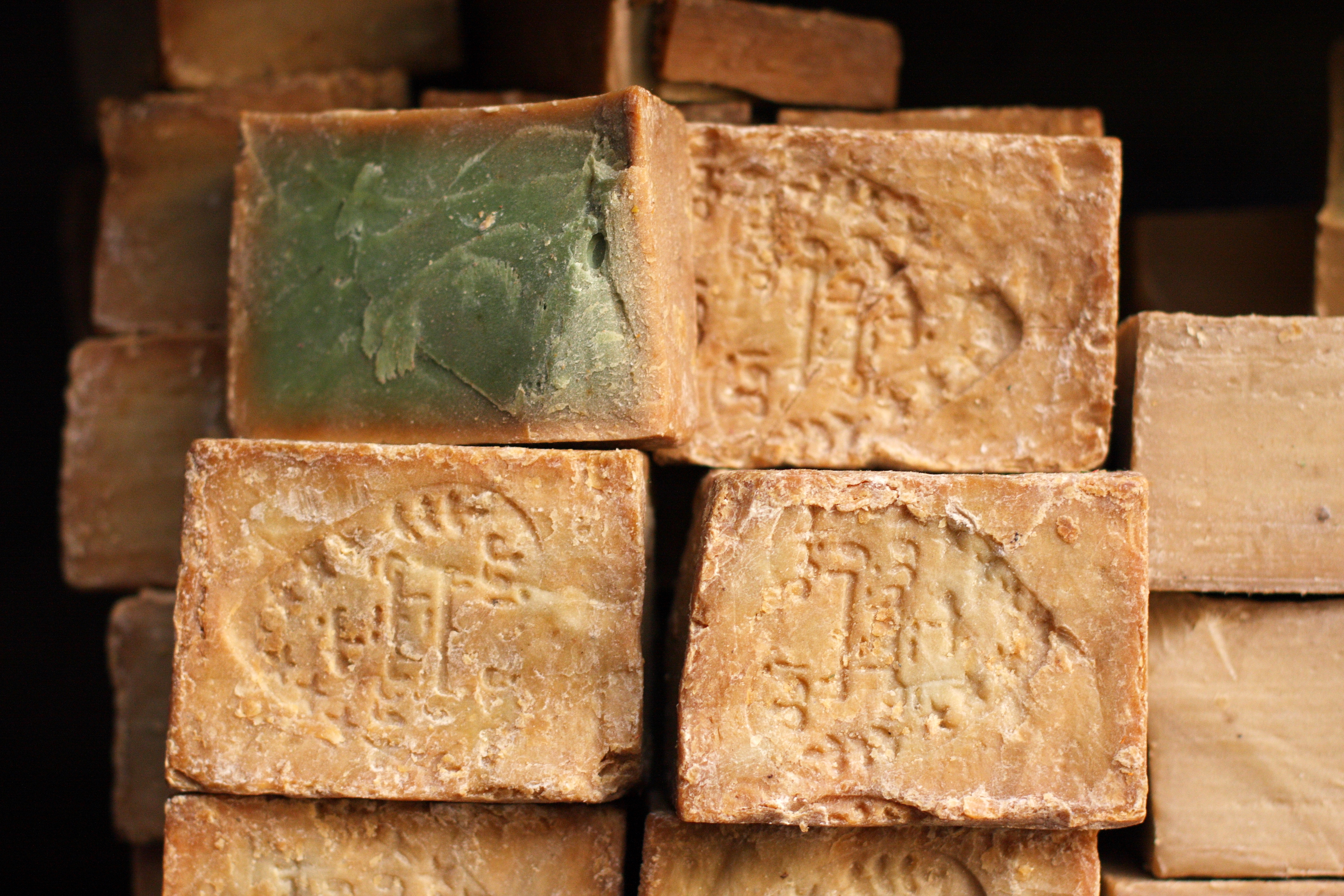
Syrian spice soap in Souq Al-Buzuriyah

== See also ==
- Al-Hamidiyah Souq
- Bazaar
- Bazaari
- Market (place)
- Medhat Pasha Souq
- Retail
- Souq
