= Madrasa of Amir Sunqur Sa'di =

Medieval Mamluk-era structure in Cairo, Egypt

- مدرسة سنقر السعدي
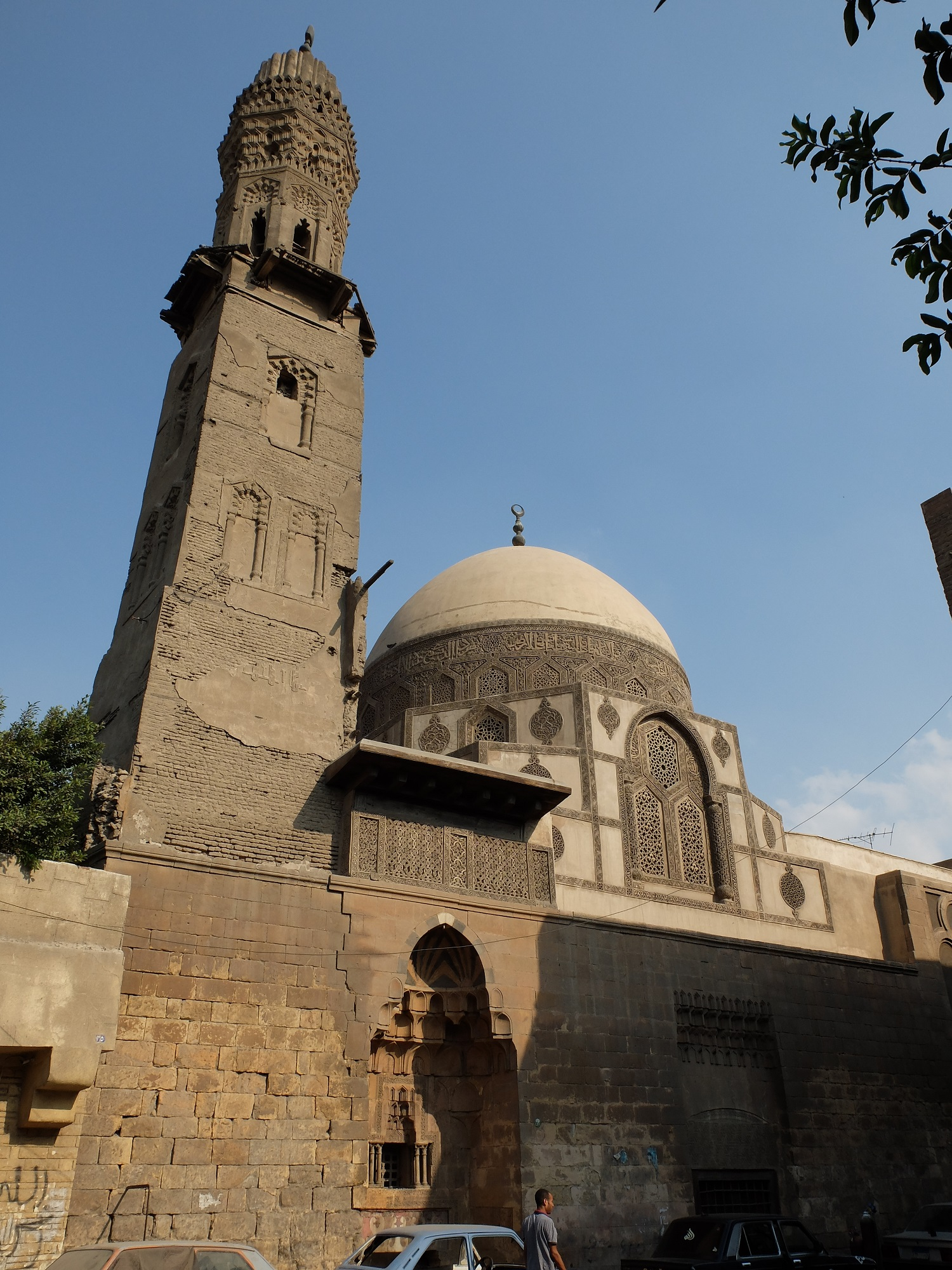
- The entrance portal is below and between the mausoleum dome and the minaret, as viewed from the street

Religion
- Affiliation: Sunni Islam (former)
- Sect: Mevlevi Sufism
- Ecclesiastical or organisational status: Madrasa (1321–c. 1607); Mausoleum (c. 1321–c. 1607); Takiyya (c. 1607–1945); Islamic museum (since 1988– )
- Status: Inactive (for worship) (repurposed as a museum)

Location
- Location: 31 Al Soufeya, Al-Darb al-Ahmar, Islamic Cairo
- Country: Egypt
- Interactive map of Madrasa of Amir Sunqur Sa'di
- Coordinates: 30°01′59″N 31°15′14″E

Architecture
- Type: Madrasa, mausoleum, takiyya
- Style: Mamluk; Ottoman; Islamic
- Founder: Amir Sunqur Sa'di
- Completed: 1321 CE (original); 19th century (Sufi lodge)

Specifications
- Dome: 2
- Minaret: 1
- Minaret height: 32 m (105 ft)
- Materials: Stone, wood, stucco, ablaq

The Madrasa of Amir Sunqur Sa'di (Arabic: مدرسة سنقر السعدي), also commonly known as the Mausoleum of (Sheikh) Hasan Sadaqa, is a former madrasa, mausoleum, and takiyya, located in the Al-Darb al-Ahmar neighbourhood of Islamic Cairo, Egypt. The medieval structure was built by amir Sunqur Sa'di between 1315 and 1321 CE, during the Mamluk era. Sunqur was forced to leave Egypt and was never buried there, but sheikh Hasan Sadaqa was later buried in the mausoleum, and therefore the building is often known by his name. From the 17th century the complex was converted into Mevlevi Sufi lodge (a takiyya, or more specifically a mawlawiyya).

The structure no longer operates for religious worship purposes and, in 1988, was converted into the Mawlawiyya Museum, also known as the Museo Mevlevi, an Islamic religious history museum.

== History ==
=== Foundation and construction in the Mamluk period ===
Amir Sunqur Sa'di was the commander of the "royal mamluks" under Sultan al-Nasir Muhammad, and a secretary of the army (na'ib al-jaysh). Al-Nasir's reign marked the peak of Cairo's prosperity in the medieval era, and a significant amount of construction took place at this time. The area northwest of the Citadel, in particular, was a previously sparsely-occupied district which was developed into a royal quarter with many palaces and mosques constructed by, or for, his most important amirs (Mamluk commanders or state officials).

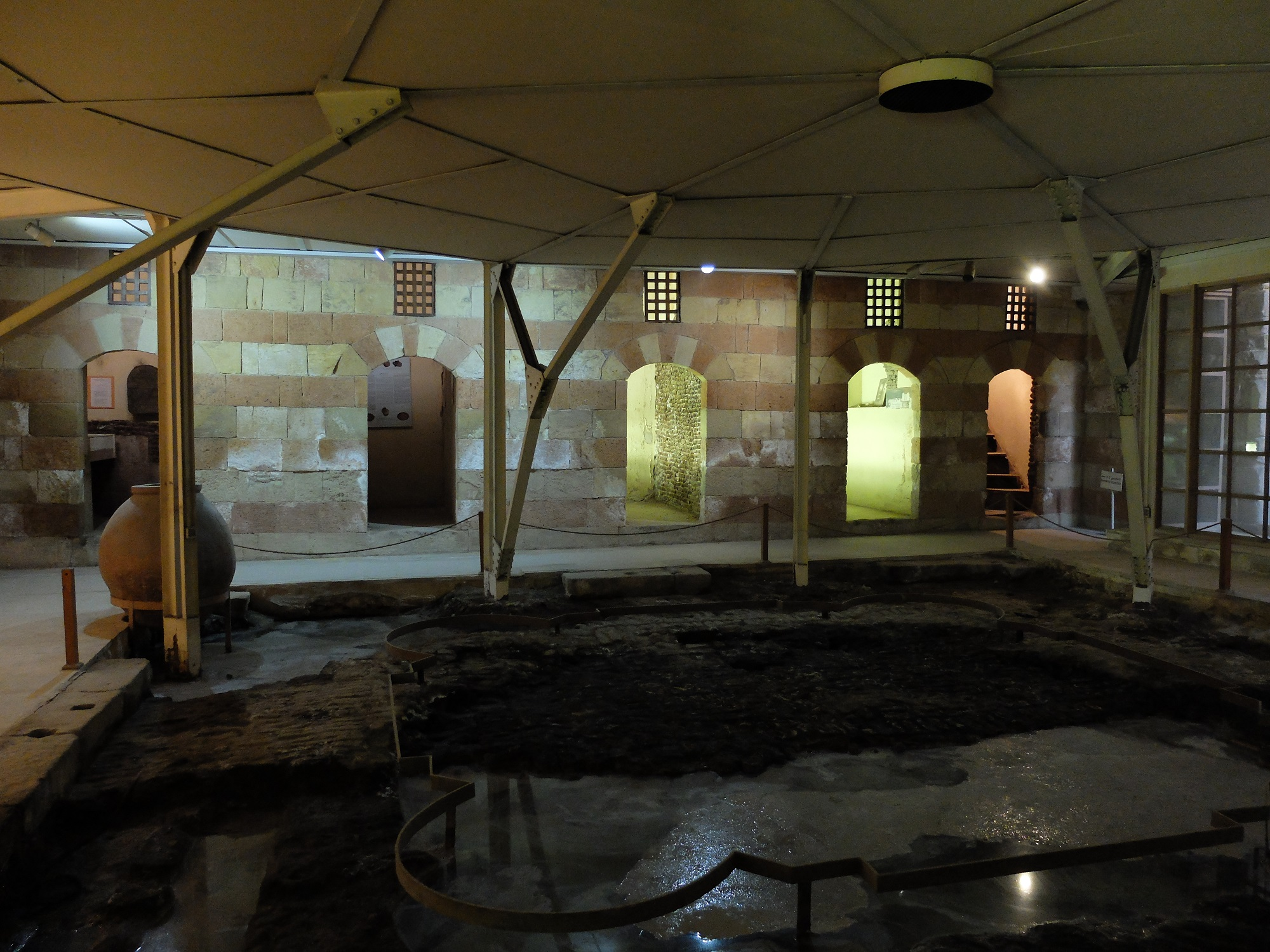
The remains of the 14th-century madrasa courtyard, now located below the floor of the Mevlevi lodge. Modern excavations in the middle revealed a 9th-century Tulunid fountain.

Between 1315 and 1321 CE (715-721 AH), Sunqur Sa'di built a madrasa (possibly intended as a khanqah), a convent (ribat) for women, and a mausoleum for himself. However, he later became involved in a quarrel with one of the most powerful amirs of his time, Amir Qawsun, whose monumental palace, built between 1330 and 1337, was located right next to the site of Sunqur's madrasa. Qawsun forced him to leave Egypt and flee to Tripoli (Lebanon) in 1323 and, as a result, he was never buried in his mausoleum. A contemporary sheikh by the name of Hasan Sadaqa was buried there instead.

There is some uncertainty as to whether the mausoleum was intended to be dedicated to Hasan Sadaqa's tomb from the beginning. The cenotaph over Hasan Sadaqa's tomb, near the chamber's mihrab, cites Sunqur as the founder of the building, but states that the building is the shrine (darih) of Hasan Sadaqa himself. This would seem to suggest that Sunqur dedicated the building to Hasan Sadaqa, but this would be unusual in Mamluk architectural history and it seems unlikely that a high-ranking Mamluk amir would construct such an impressive mausoleum and religious complex with no intention to use it for himself. Sunqur Sa'di's own ruined cenotaph, left unused, has been found in the center of the chamber.

Elsewhere, Hasan Sadaqa is described in historical sources as a wealthy notable, possibly a merchant, who sponsored the building, while his own cenotaph describes him as a Sufi sheikh. To add to the confusion, the mausoleum is dated from 1315, well before Sunqur fled Egypt in 1323 and before the mausoleum's completion in 1321, while other sources give his date of death as 1345, well after Sunqur had fled. One possible interpretation is that Hasan Sadaqa was a Sufi sheikh with great wealth who co-sponsored the foundation and construction of Sunqur's building, and thus at some point was granted the privilege of sharing the mausoleum with Sunqur. If so, this arrangement would nonetheless be unusual in Mamluk architectural traditions, but the question remains unresolved.

=== Later history and use as a Mevlevi Sufi lodge ===
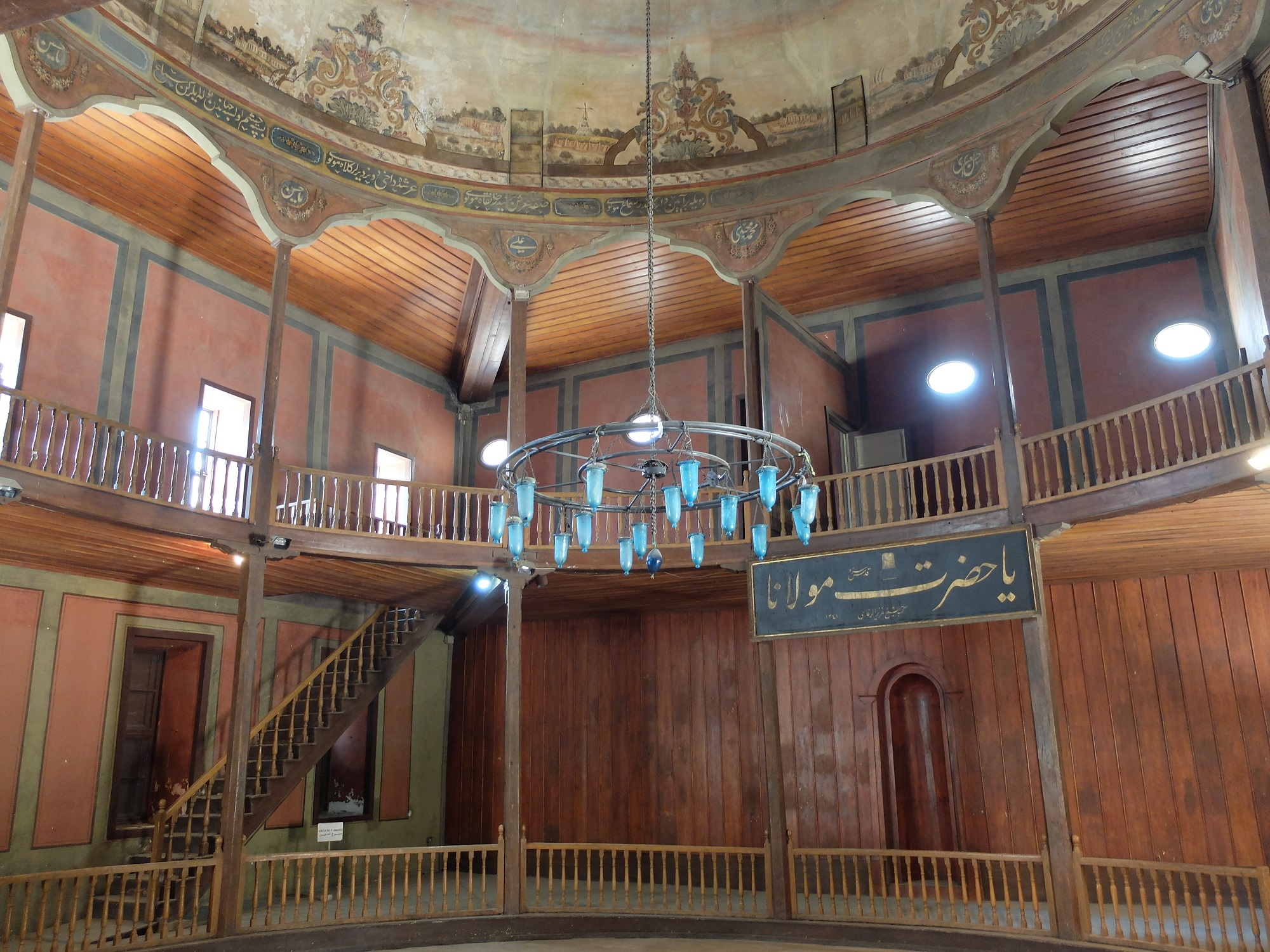
The 19th-century sama'khana, or ceremonial hall, of the Mevlevi lodge

The Mevlevi Sufi order, which originated in Turkey, likely arrived in Cairo after 1517, thanks to Egypt's integration into the Ottoman Empire. In 1607 the grounds of the madrasa and part of the ruins of Qawsun's palace were given over to the Mevlevi Sufi order as a donation from a Yemeni Ottoman pasha called Yusuf Sinan. It was part of a larger donation which included three other plots of land in Cairo and in other locations in the Nile Delta region. The Mevlevis adapted the site for use as a lodge (a takiyya or mawlawiyya) for their order. The original donation by Yusuf Sinan is well-documented and even contained instructions for the establishment's staff and their salaries: these included an imam, a muezzin, and 38 people required for performing the sama (whirling dervish), along with maintenance staff. A theatre or ceremonial hall for the performance of the sama was built in 1810 on top of the former courtyard of the original madrasa, with painted decoration dated from 1857. New tombs for the order's Sufi sheikhs were added in or near the original mausoleum over time. The Mevlevis remained at the site until 1945.

In the 1970s, excavations and restorations began, led by an Italian team, and the building was reopened in July 1988 as a small Islamic museum known as the Mawlawiyya (or Mevlevi) Museum, or Museo Mevlevi, exhibiting the historical remains and the restored Mevlevi lodge. During further archaeological investigations and restoration of the mausoleum between 2002 and 2007, the marble remains of the unused cenotaph of Sunqur Sa'di were found in the centre of the mausoleum chamber and reconstituted.

== Description ==
The madrasa structure itself only partially remains today, as the Mevlevi order built their facilities on top of it. The mausoleum and the sama ceremonial hall are in better shape and have been restored in recent times.

=== The Mamluk-era structure ===
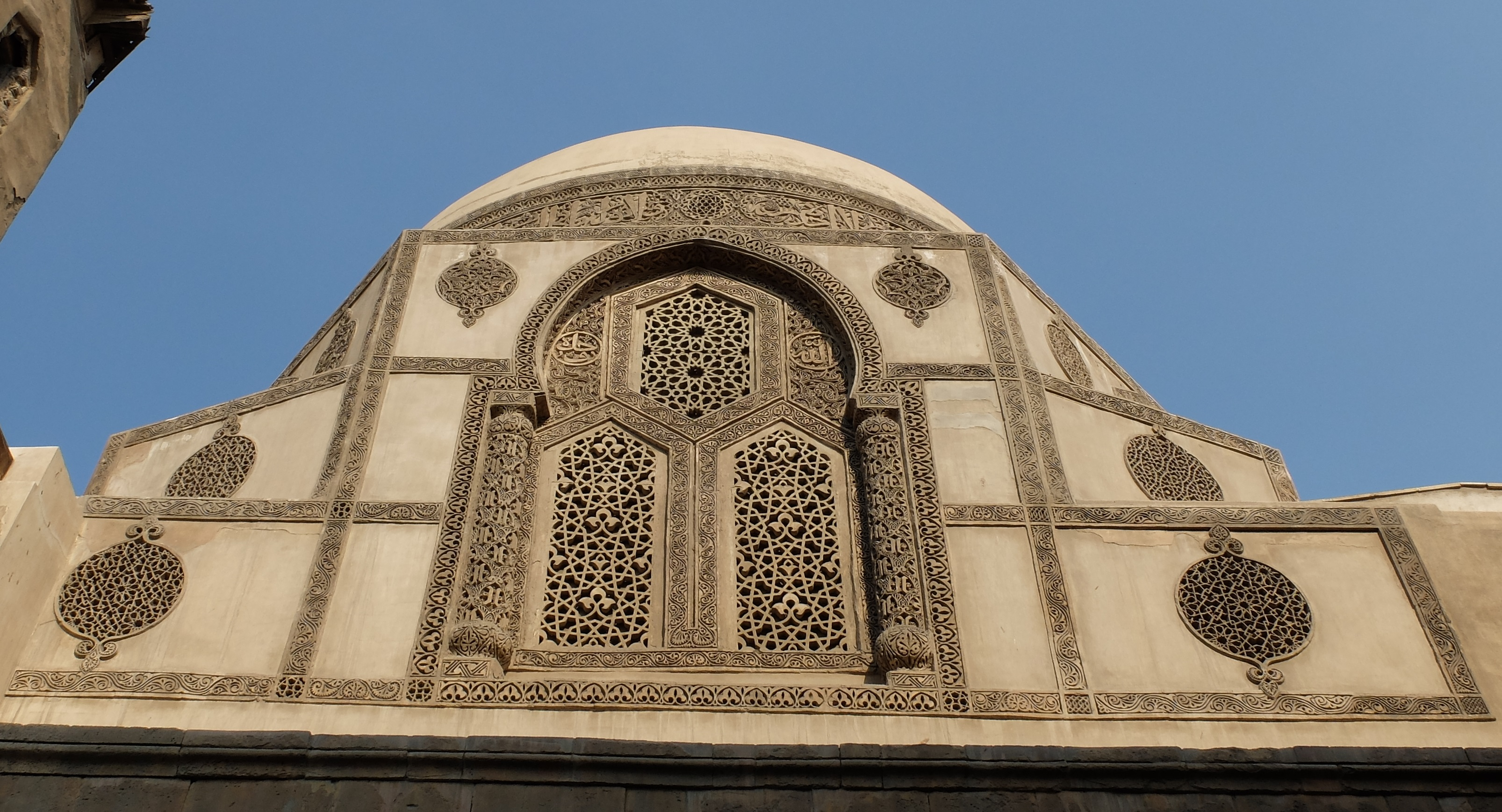
The detailed stucco decoration on the mausoleum exterior

The building's entrance from the street is through a doorway under a canopy of stone-carved decorations. To the left is the mausoleum and the former madrasa, marked by a dome and minaret at the building's corner. The exterior surface of the mausoleum dome, as well as the exterior of the minaret, are covered in lavish carved stucco decoration that is considered uncommon in Mamluk architecture. The minaret's overall shape is typical of the Bahri Mamluk period, with a square shaft and a fluted cap with a keel-arch profile, that is similar to the minaret of the Mausoleum of Salar and Sanjar al-Jawli. Inside, the madrasa's remains are located beneath the 19th-century Sufi lodge's theatre. The walls of the madrasa are made of ablaq (two-coloured) stone, around a central sahn around which were large iwans, and multiple smaller rooms. Only the northwest iwan remains today, adjacent to the mausoleum chamber. In the central courtyard are the remains of a fountain with a lobed profile, excavated during modern restorations, which dates from the Tulunid period in the 9th century. In another corner, an even older well (dating from before 850 CE) was also discovered.

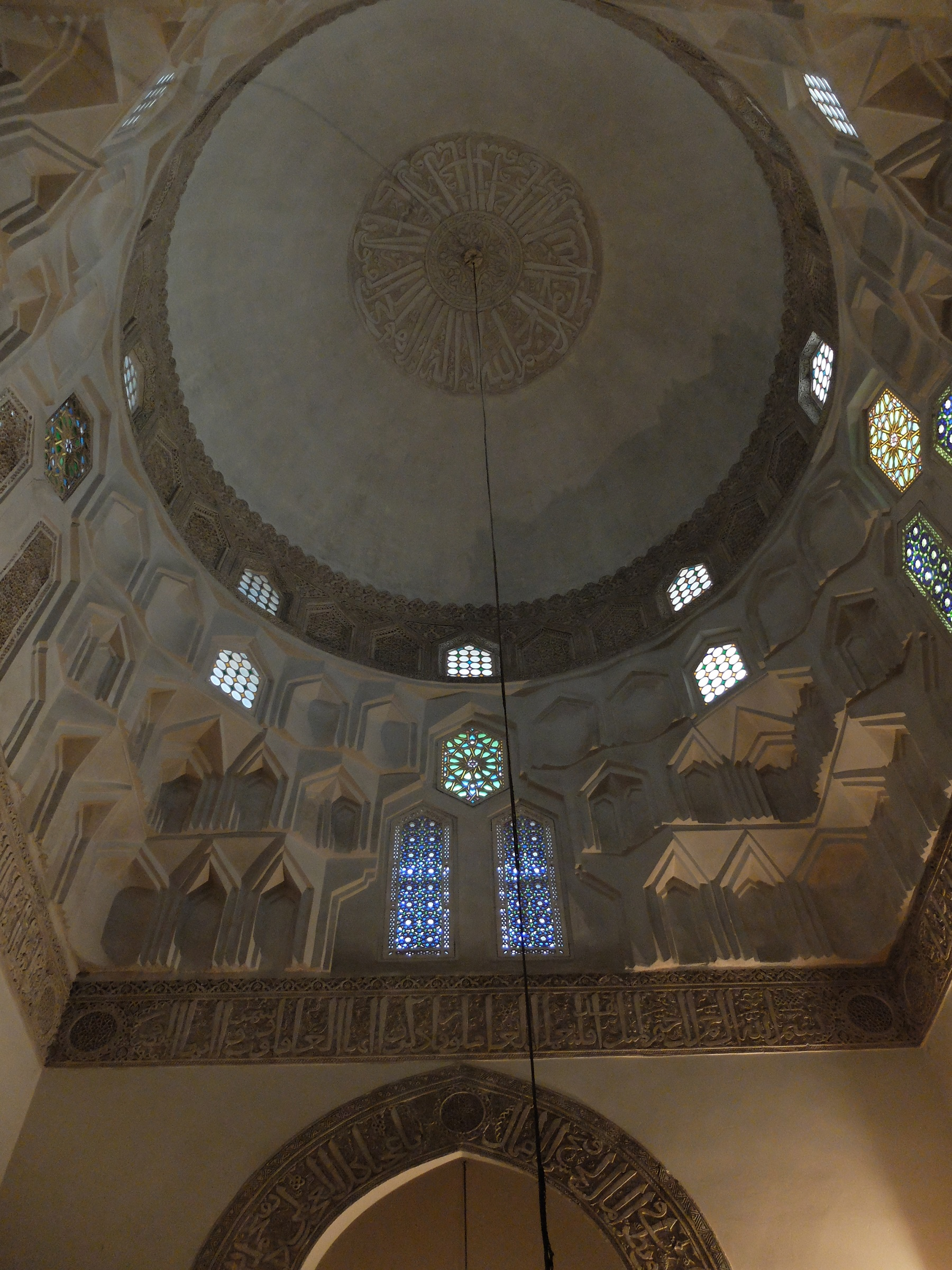
The mausoleum chamber, with muqarnas squinches and Arabic inscriptions in stucco. Most of the inscriptions are from the Maqama of al-Hariri, rather than from the Qur'an.

The mausoleum chamber is under the northwestern dome (visible from the street), at the structure's northern corner, and contains the cenotaph of Hasan Sadaqa. It is 7.8 by 8.4 metres (26 by 28 ft), meaning it is not quite square, and the dome above is slightly elliptic as a consequence. The squinches (the transition zones between the round dome and the square chamber) are composed of pendentives with muqarnas forms, with colored glass windows in between. The chamber's decoration otherwise consists of carved stucco bands containing Arabic calligraphy inscriptions, on arabesque backgrounds, running along the walls. One extraordinary feature of this mausoleum is the fact that these lengthy inscriptions are not from the Qur'an or any other religious text. Instead, they are excerpts from the Maqamat al-Hariri, a collection of stories by the poet al-Hariri which describe the adventures of a vagabond and trickster, Abu Zayd, who travels and relies on his wits and eloquence to survive. Although the Maqamat al-Hariri is valued as a work of Arabic literature and appears to have been popular with the Egyptian Mamluks of Sunqur's era, the decision to include this type of text instead of Qur'anic verses or other religious selections is considered bold and unusual. It may be that Sunqur was a connoisseur of literature, or that he simply had eccentric tendencies, which manifested here. The only Qur'anic inscription in the mausoleum is a short circular inscription of the Throne Verse at the apex of the dome.

The rooms of the ribat, built by Sunqur Sa'di, are now offices for the Italian-Egyptian Center for Restoration and Archaeology, which restored the building and opened the museum. The grounds also include a garden which was part of Qawsun's palace next-door but integrated into the precinct by the Mevlevis.

=== 19th-century Mevlevi Sufi lodge ===
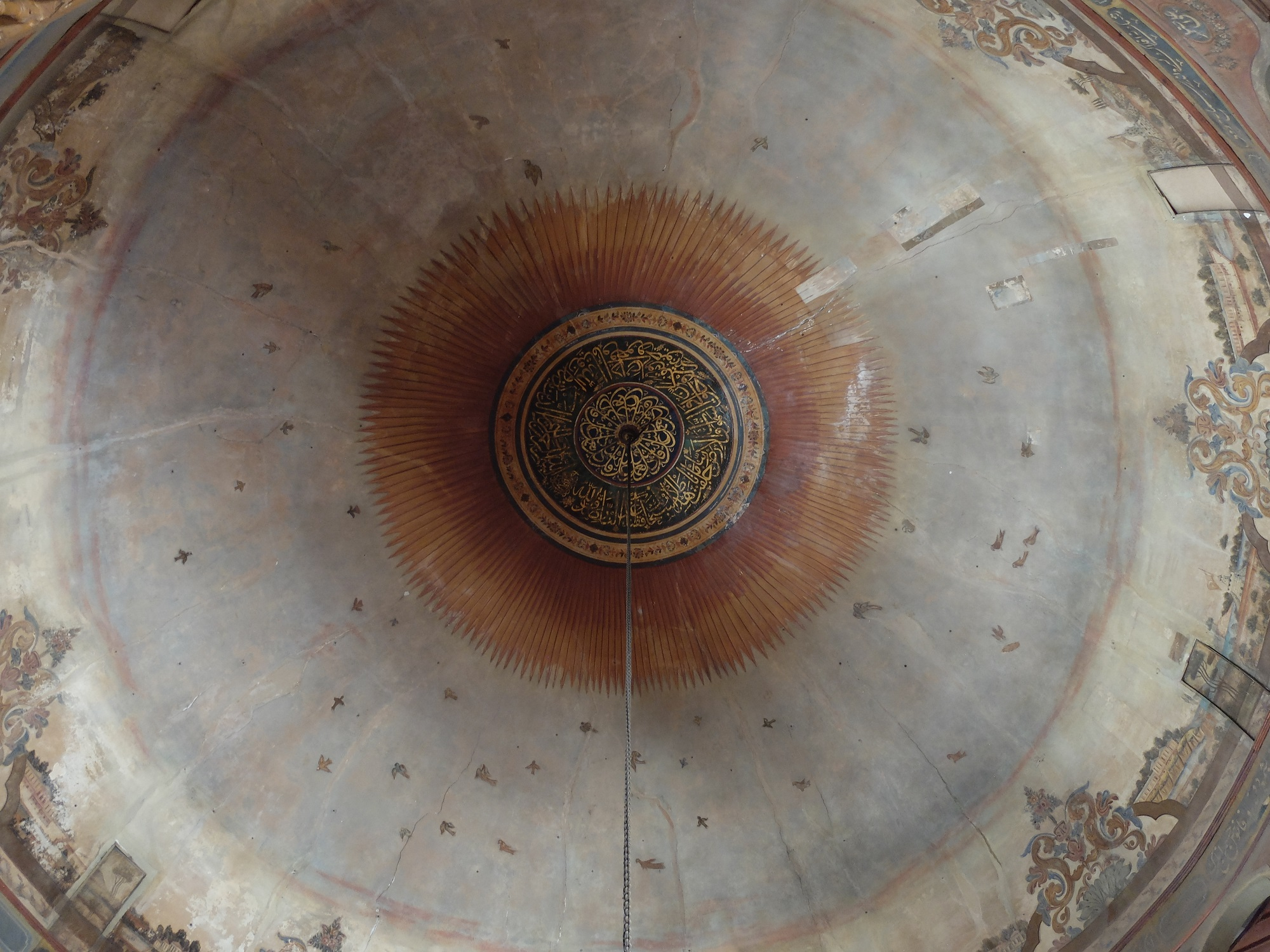
The dome over the Mevlevi ceremonial hall (the sama'khana). The painted decoration dates from 1857.

The Sufi ritual hall/theatre, known as a sama'khana (Arabic, "House of Listening") or semahane (Turkish), is made largely of wood, in an architectural style reminiscent of late Ottoman Baroque. It is built above the former madrasa's courtyard. The hall is 15 by 15 metres (49 by 49 ft), and is centered around a wide 10.65-metre (34.9 ft) circular floor, under another wide dome, where the sama was performed. The floor is surrounded on all sides by a two-storied gallery, though the old northwest iwan is still accessible on one side. The theatre's current structure was built in 1810 while the decoration dates from 1857. The decoration includes scenes of landscapes, gardens, and birds painted under the dome, plus a circular Arabic inscription at the dome's apex.

== See also ==
- Islam in Egypt
- List of madrasas in Egypt
- List of mausoleums in Egypt
- List of museums in Egypt
- List of museums of Islamic art
