= Palace of Yashbak =

Egyptian palace

Palace of Amir Yashbak (or Palace of Amir Qawsun)
- Qasr Yashbak, Qasr Qawsun, Qawsun Palace
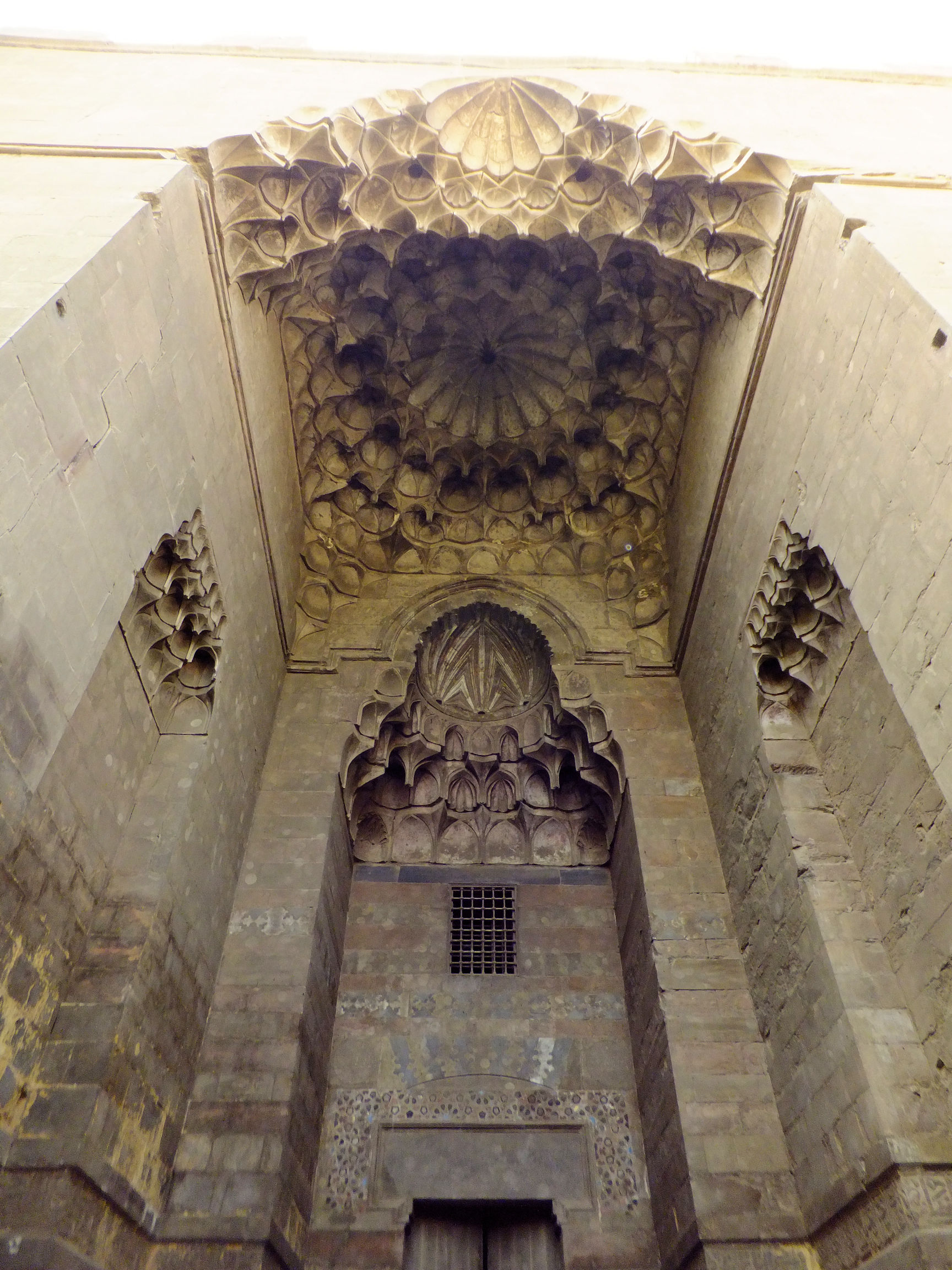
- Entrance portal of the palace
- Interactive map of Palace of Amir Yashbak (or Palace of Amir Qawsun)
- 30°01′57″N 31°15′17″E
- Type: palace
- Location: Cairo, Egypt

History
- Founder: Sultan al-Nasir Muhammad ibn Qalawun
- Built: 1330–1337
- Built for: (amir) Sayf al-Din Qawsun ibn Abdullah an-Nasiri as-Saqi (shortened to Qawsun)

Site notes
- Architectural styles: Mamluk, Islamic
- Restored: 1480s
- Restored by: (amir) Yashbak min Mahdi

Palace of Yashbak, also known as the Palace of Amir Qawsun, is a semi-ruined palace in Medieval Cairo, Egypt, originally built between 1330 and 1337 CE for the Mamluk amir (high official) known as Qawsun. It was restored and expanded again in the 1480s by the amir Yashbak min Mahdi under the reign of Sultan Qaytbay.

== History ==
The palace was built between 1330 and 1337 for amir Qawsun (full name: Sayf ad-Din Qawsun ibn Abdullah an-Nasiri as-Saqi) just north-west of Cairo's Citadel, in an area outside the main walled city which was developed during the prosperous reign of Sultan al-Nasir Muhammad. This area was once home to many such palaces of amirs and other powerful Mamluks, but Qawsun's palace is one of the few remaining examples today (along with the nearby Palace of Amir Taz). Qawsun's palace was actually commissioned by Sultan al-Nasir Muhammad himself for the benefit of Qawsun. The sultan commissioned more than one such palace in this area for his favourite amirs, apparently as part of his wider building program to develop a monumental royal quarter in the Citadel (which contained the sultan's own palace, the Qasr Ablaq, which overlooked the amirs' palaces below) and in the areas around it.

Qawsun himself was one of the most powerful amirs (commanders or high officials) under al-Nasir Muhammad and some of his successors, as well as al-Nasir's son-in-law. Another rival amir, Sunqur Sa'di, had built a madrasa and mausoleum for himself next to the site of Qawsun's palace in 1315–1321, but was later forced to leave Egypt after angering Qawsun. His structure still stands today and is also known as the Mausoleum of Hasan Sadaqa, who was later buried there instead.

In the late 15th century Yashbak min Mahdi, a powerful amir under Sultan al-Ashraf Qaytbay (1468–1496), restored and expanded Qawsun's palace for his own use, hence why it is also known today as the Palace of Yashbak.

== Architecture ==
Two thirds of the palace are ruined today, but some of its high walls and structure still stand. Its best-preserved element is its unusually massive and monumental entrance portal. This portal dates from two eras. The original entrance, from Qawsun's time, is a tall portal crowned with a hood of muqarnas sculpting and stone-carved patterns in ablaq (two-coloured) masonry. Unusually, it appears to be signed by its maker, a craftsman named Mahmud the Syrian, in a cartouche to the right of the entrance. In the late 15th century, Yashbak added to the portal by extending it with projecting walls on either side, with the space between these covered by an even more elaborate dome-like vault of stone muqarnas. The portal thus appears now as a deep recessed entrance with multiple decorative elements. Other decorative details include multi-coloured mosaics around the doorway and a large stone inscription running along the walls at eye level.

The entrance led into a square vestibule chamber covered by a dome. Much of the ground floor was made up of massive vaulted halls which were used as stables and storage, while the upper floor supported a lavish reception hall (known as a qa'a). The vaulted roofs were supported on massive horseshoe arches in ablaq masonry. The reception hall followed a standard layout: a large roofed court, about 12 meters long, with two iwans (vaulted chambers open to one side) facing each other at opposite ends of the court (similar to many madrasa courtyards in Mamluk architecture). This hall was covered by a wooden roof that probably also featured a lantern and whose scale must have required significant technical mastery. While most of the palace is now ruined, it is likely that it featured many of the usual decorative and architectural features of the time, such as central fountains, marble pavement, marble mosaics, stained-glass windows, wooden mashrabiyyas, and ceilings of carved, painted, and gilded wood.

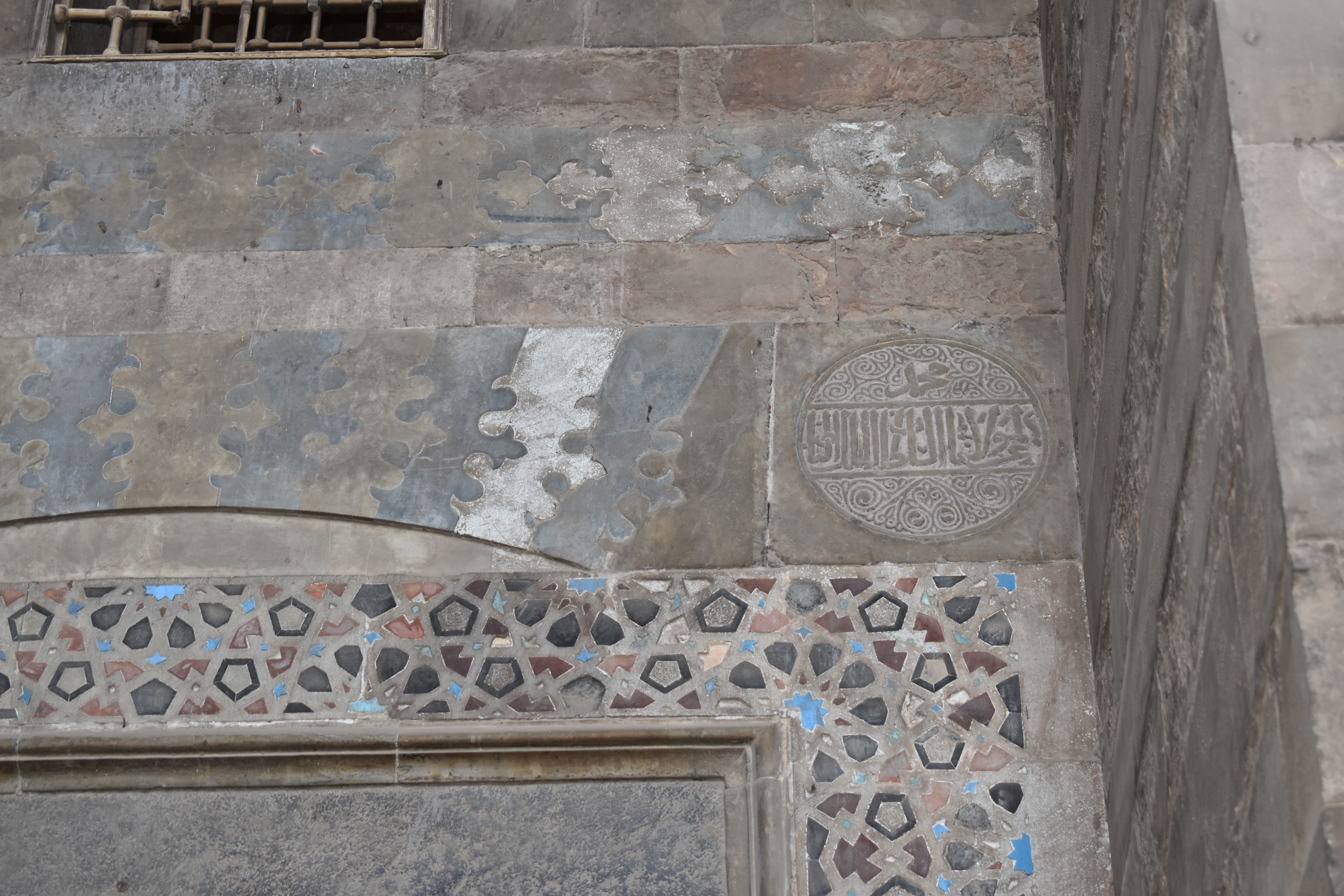
Details of the decoration above the doorway.

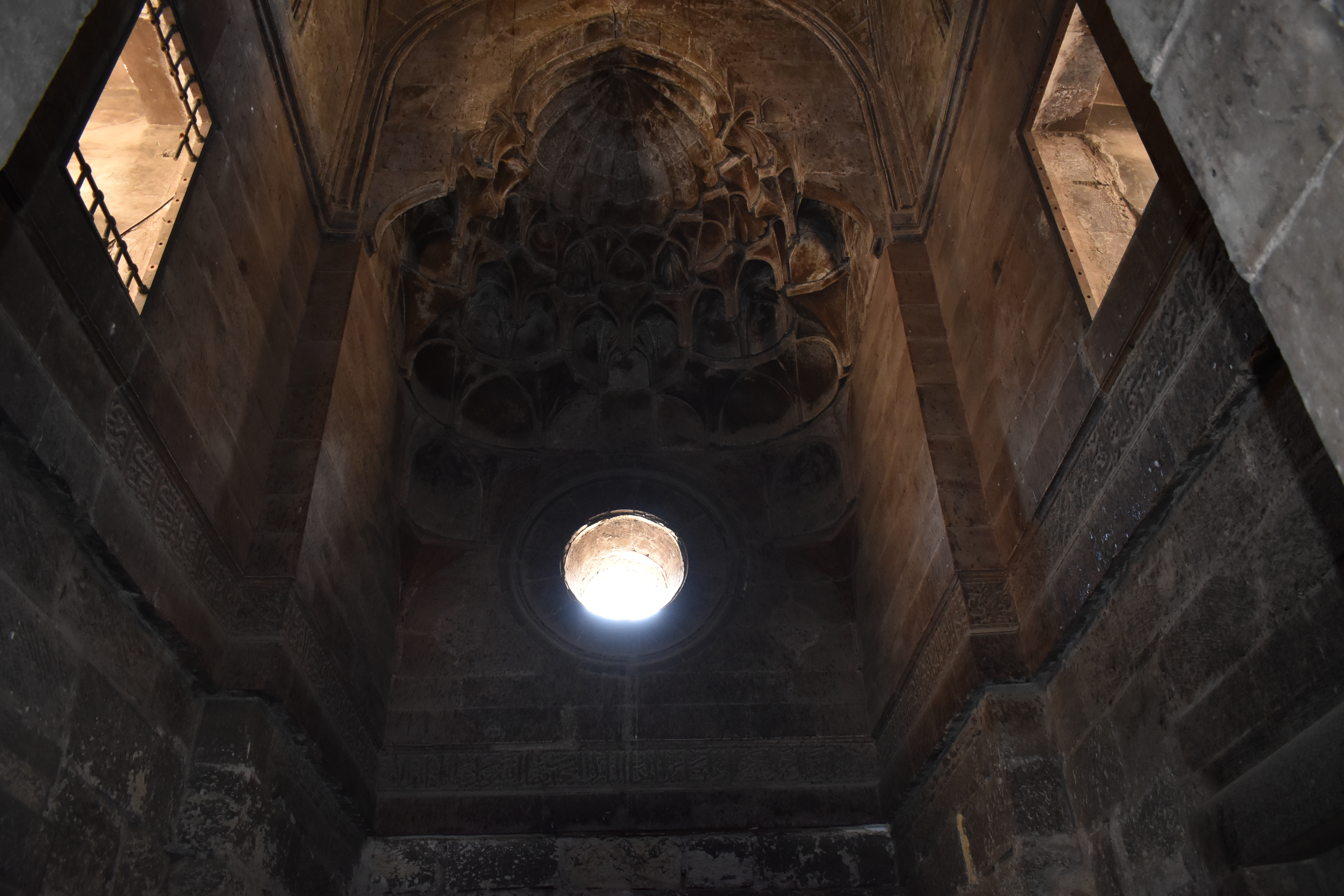
The vestibule behind the entrance.

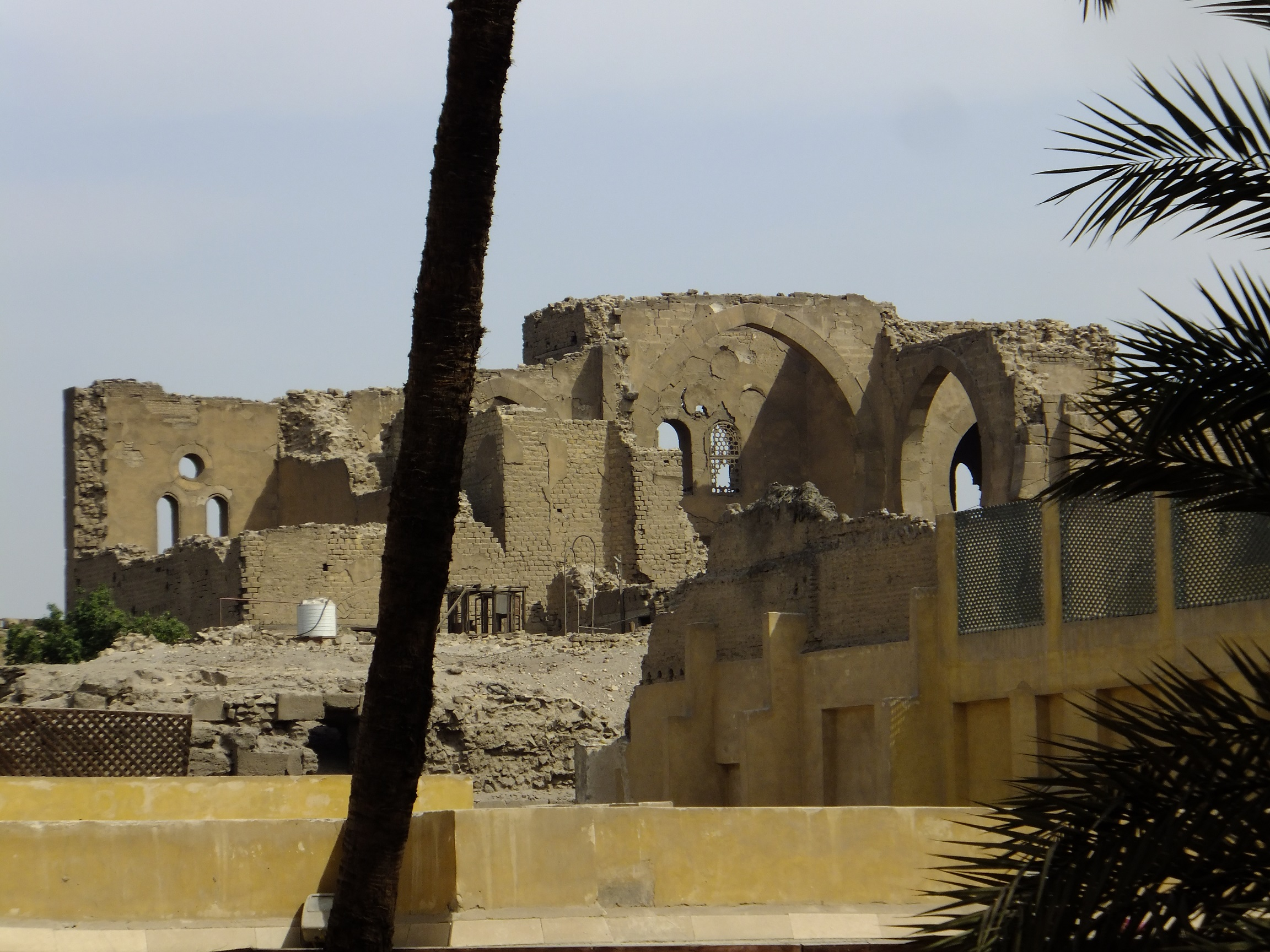
View from afar of the ruined walls of the palace.
