= Damascene architecture =

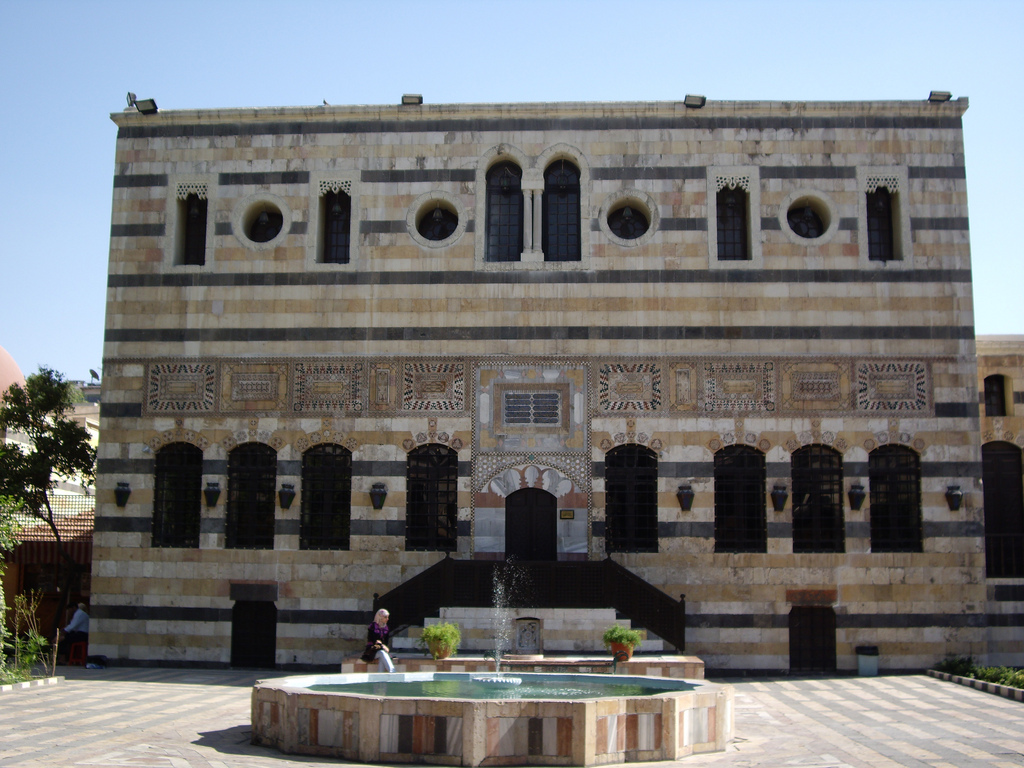
Al-Azm Palace, Damascus

Damascene architecture is a traditional architectural style associated with the historic city of Damascus. It represents a layered synthesis of artistic and structural influences accumulated over millennia, reflecting the city's role as a major cultural and political center. Characterized by inward-oriented residential forms, elaborate interior decoration, and distinctive masonry techniques such as Ablaq, Damascene architecture embodies both aesthetic refinement and environmental adaptation.

== History ==
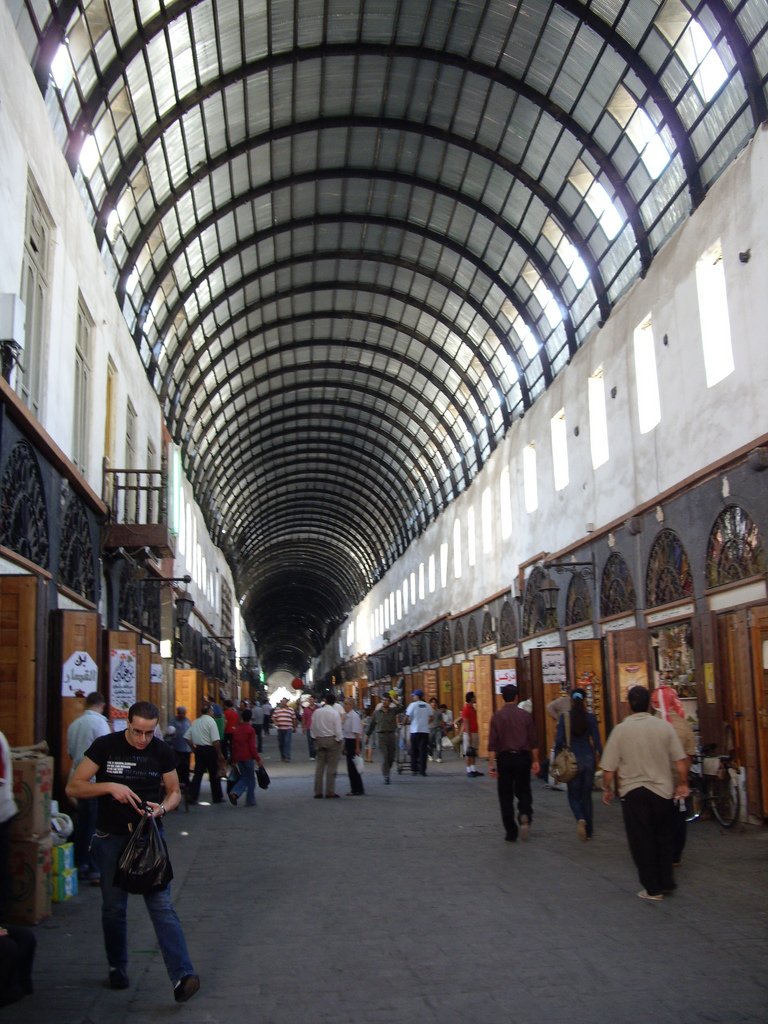
Midhat Pasha Souq, built in 64 BC

The architectural development of Damascus has been shaped by a succession of civilizations, each contributing elements that were adapted into a cohesive local style. Early foundations date to Aramean and later Roman periods, when urban planning concepts such as orthogonal street grids and monumental public buildings were introduced. Under the Roman Empire and later the Byzantine Empire, the city saw the construction of Temples, Colonnades, and Churches, traces of which influenced later Islamic structures.

A decisive transformation occurred during the Umayyad Caliphate (7th–8th centuries), when Damascus became the imperial capital. Architectural forms from Byzantine and late antique traditions were reinterpreted within an Islamic framework, producing hybrid designs that emphasized courtyards, arcades, and decorative abstraction. Subsequent empires including the Ayyubids, Mamluks, and Ottoman Empire, further enriched the style. The Ottoman Empire, in particular, influenced domestic architecture through refinements in spatial organization and interior ornamentation.

== Characteristics ==
One of the most notable examples of the traditional Damascene homes is the 18th century Azm Palace, residence of As'ad Pasha al-Azm, the Ottoman governor of Damascus, which continued to house the descendants of the al-Azm family for decades. The structure consists of several buildings and three wings: the harem, the selamlek and the khademlek. The harem is the family wing, which contains the private residence of the family and includes the baths, which are a replica of the public baths in the city on a smaller scale. The selamlek is the guest wing, and it comprises the formal halls, reception areas and large courtyards with traditional cascading fountain, while in the northern part of the palace were the servant quarters and the center of housekeeping activities.

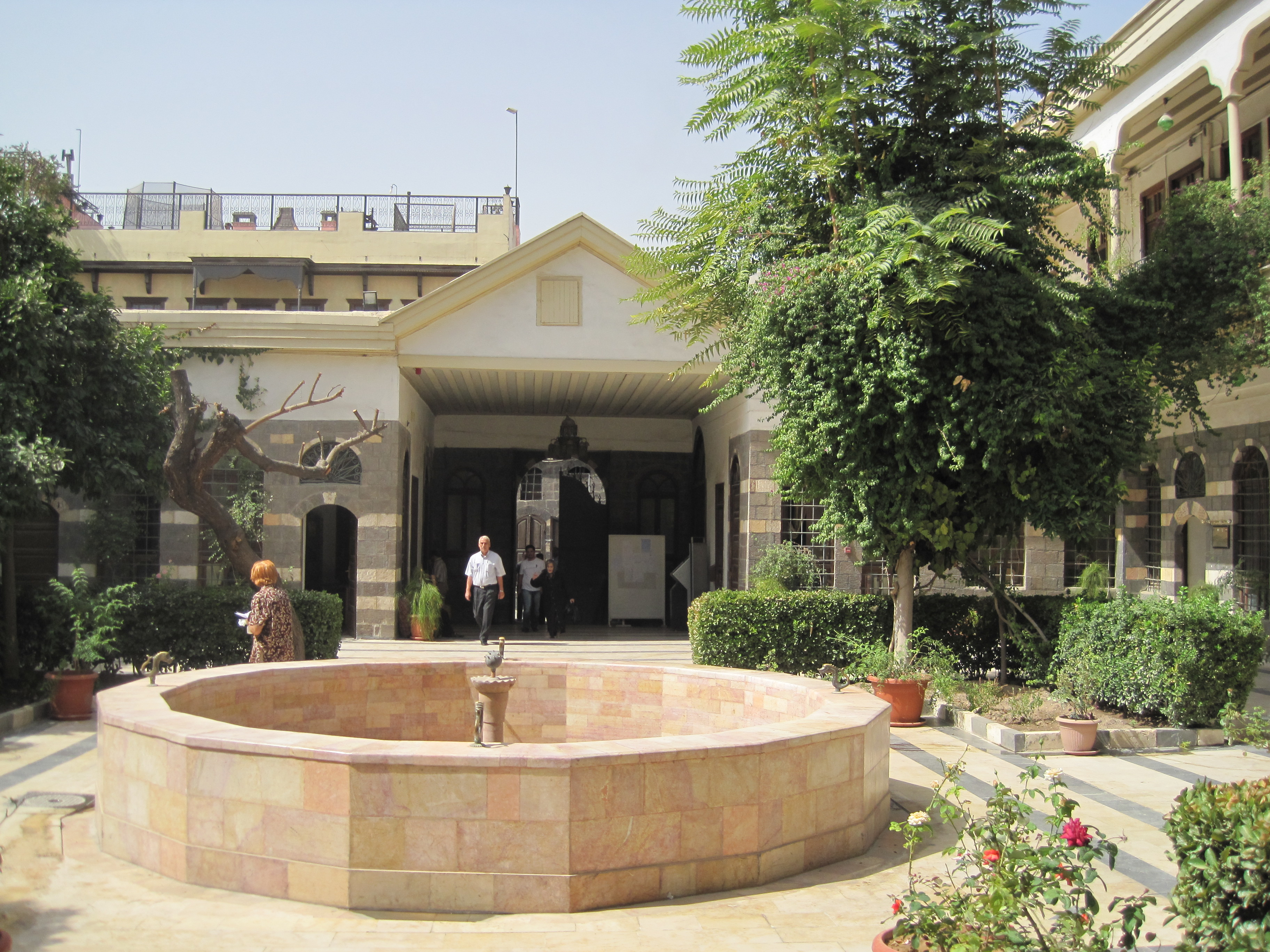
Damascus, Maktab Anbar, reception courtyard

=== Courtyard Houses ===
The most recognizable feature of Damascene architecture is the inward-facing courtyard house. Organized around a central open space (hosh), these residences prioritize privacy and environmental comfort. The courtyard functions as the heart of the home, often featuring a fountain, trees, and shaded seating areas. This design reflects both climatic necessity and social customs.

=== Inward Orientation and Spatial Hierarchy ===
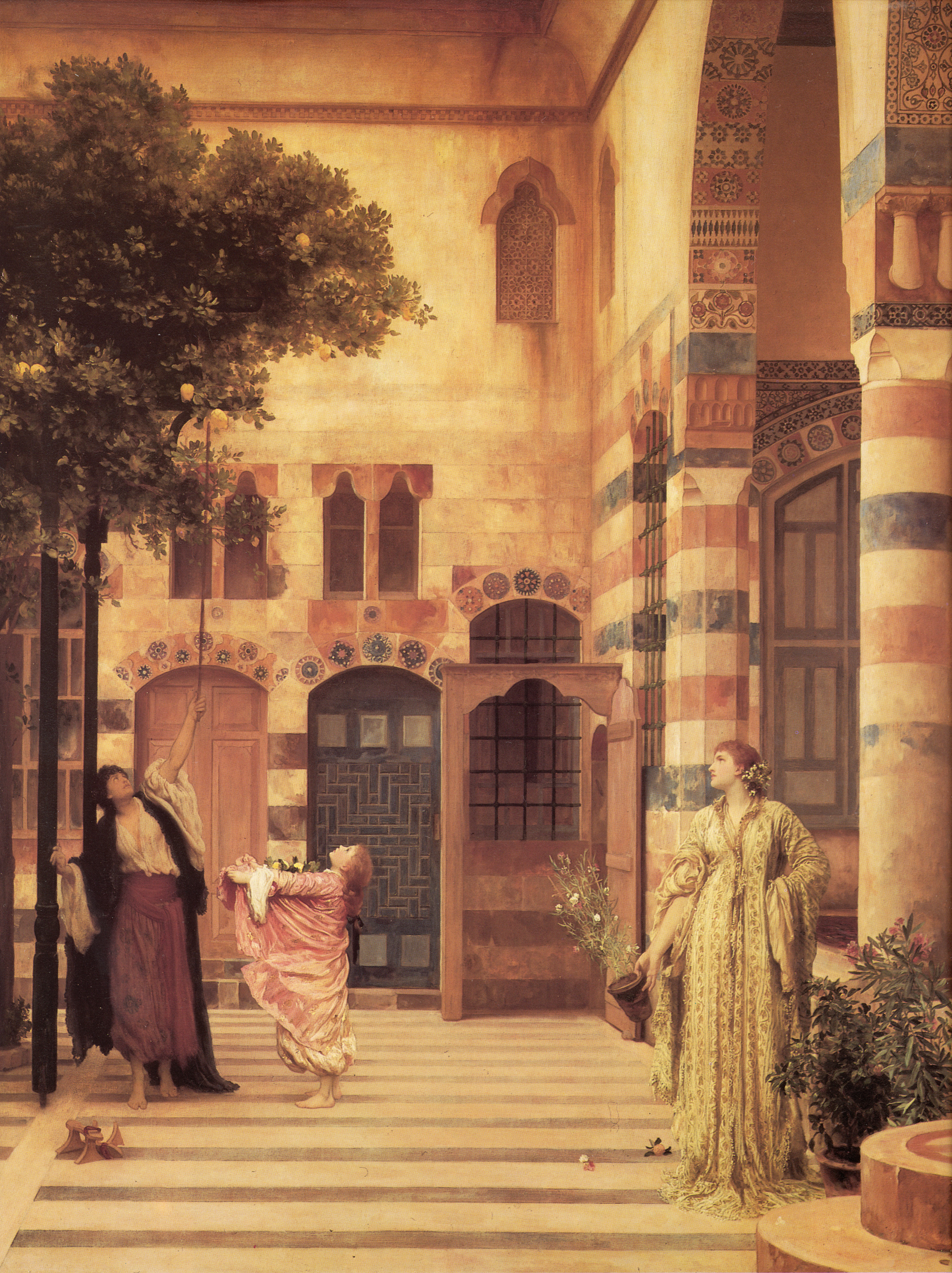
Damascene house interior depicted in; Old Damascus, Jew's Quarter (1874), by Frederick Leighton

Exterior façades of traditional houses are typically austere, with few windows and minimal ornamentation. In contrast, interiors are richly decorated. Spaces are arranged hierarchically, with distinct areas for family life and guest reception, illustrating cultural values surrounding hospitality and privacy.

=== Ablaq Masonry ===
A defining visual and structural element of Damascene architecture is ablaq, a technique involving alternating courses of light limestone and dark basalt. This method, widely used in Façades, arches, and courtyards, creates a striking striped appearance. Beyond its aesthetic appeal, ablaq also serves to emphasize architectural lines and structural rhythms.

The significance of ablaq lies in its role as both a decorative and identity-forming feature. While it appeared in earlier regional traditions, probably during the Byzantine period. it became particularly refined and emblematic in Damascus during the medieval Islamic period, especially under Mamluk patronage. Its consistent use distinguishes Damascene buildings from those in other regions, where stonework tends to be more uniform in color.

=== Decorative Arts ===
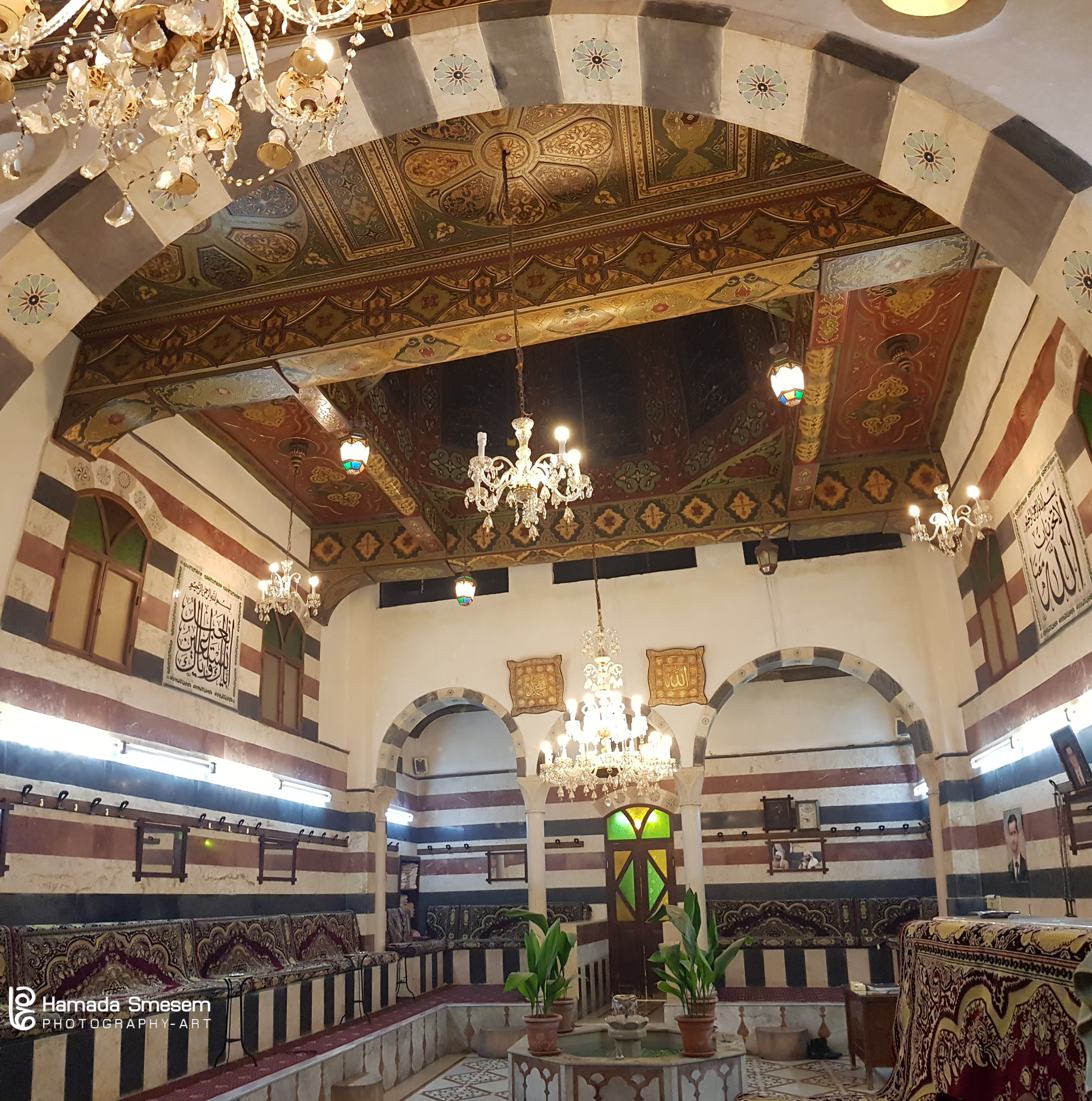
Al-Rifai Hammam in Old Damascus

Interior decoration is a major component of Damascene architecture. Notable elements include:

- Painted wooden panels in the ‘Ajami technique, often incorporating gold leaf
- Geometric and vegetal Arabesque patterns
- Calligraphic inscriptions
- Mashrabiya screens, which filter light and provide ventilation

These features demonstrate the integration of craftsmanship and artistic expression into everyday living spaces.

== Urban Form ==
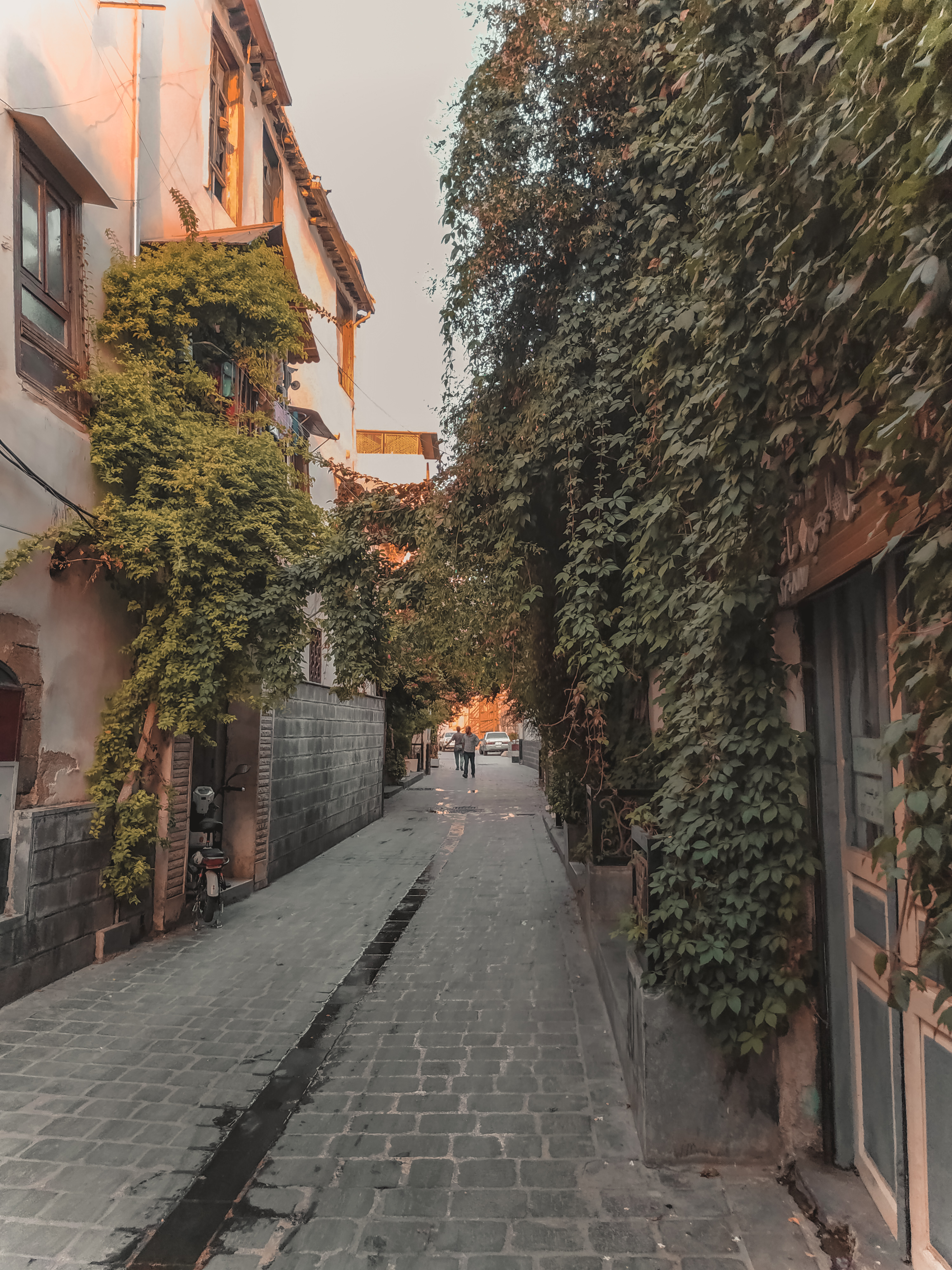
Narrow street in Old Damascus

The historic fabric of Damascus is composed of narrow, winding streets designed to provide shade and mitigate heat. Residential quarters are often organized into small neighborhoods, reinforcing social cohesion. The integration of homes, markets, mosques, and public baths reflects a multifunctional urban environment typical of pre-modern Islamic cities.

== Environmental Adaptation ==
Damascene architecture incorporates passive cooling strategies suited to the region's hot, dry climate. Thick stone walls provide insulation, while courtyards enable air circulation. Water features and vegetation contribute to cooling and humidity control, creating a comfortable microclimate within the home.
