= Al-Azm Palace =

Coordinates: 33°30′37″N 36°18′25″E

- قصر العظم
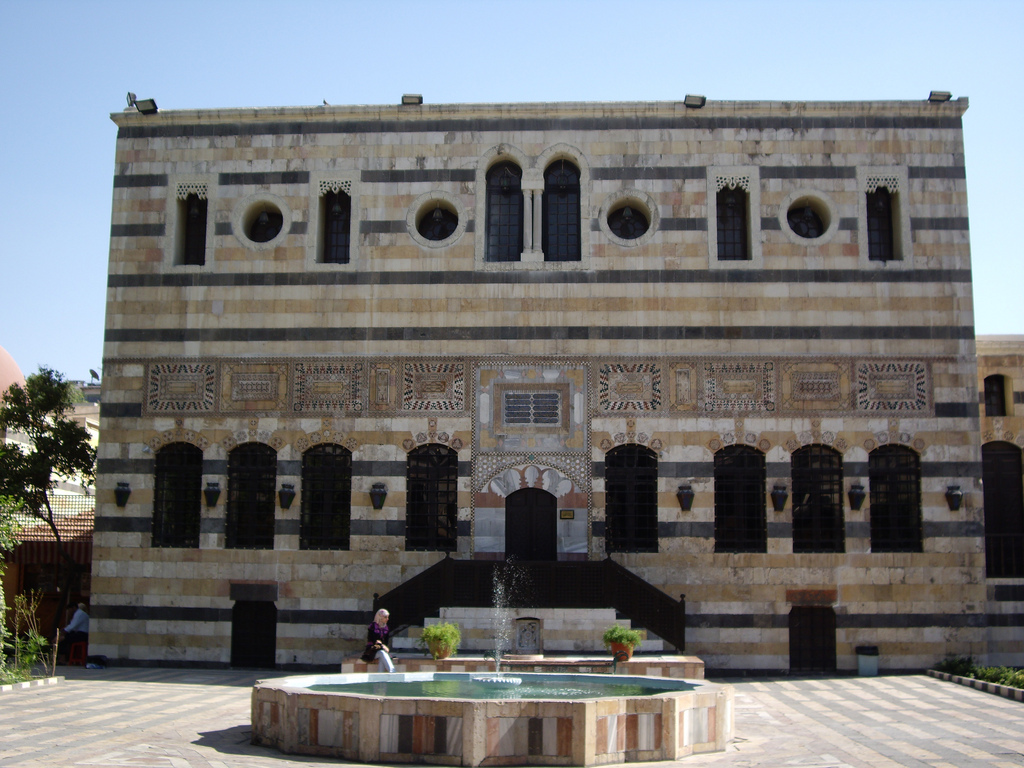
- Alternative names: Azem Palace, Azm Palace, Qasr al-Azm

General information
- Type: Palace, Museum
- Architectural style: Damascene architecture, with ablaq
- Location: Damascus, Syria, Al-Buzuriyah Souq
- Completed: 1749
- Renovated: 1945-1961
- Client: As'ad Pasha al-Azm
- Owner: Directorate-General of Antiquities and Museums

Technical details
- Floor count: 2
- Floor area: 6400 m^{2}

Renovating team
- Awards: Aga Khan Award for Architecture

UNESCO World Heritage Site
- Official name: Ancient City of Damascus
- Type: Cultural
- Criteria: i, ii, iii, iv, vi
- Designated: 1979 (3rd session)
- Reference no.: 20
- Region: Arab States

Al-Azm Palace (Arabic: قصر العظم Qaṣr al-ʿAẓm) is a palace in Damascus, Syria, built in 1749. Located north of Al-Buzuriyah Souq in the Ancient City of Damascus, the palace was built in 1749 to be the private residence for As'ad Pasha al-Azm, the governor of Damascus; during the French Mandate for Syria and the Lebanon, it housed the French Institute.

After the Syrian government had purchased the buildings from the Al-Azm family and extensive reconstruction, the palace houses the Museum of Arts and Popular Traditions.

== History ==
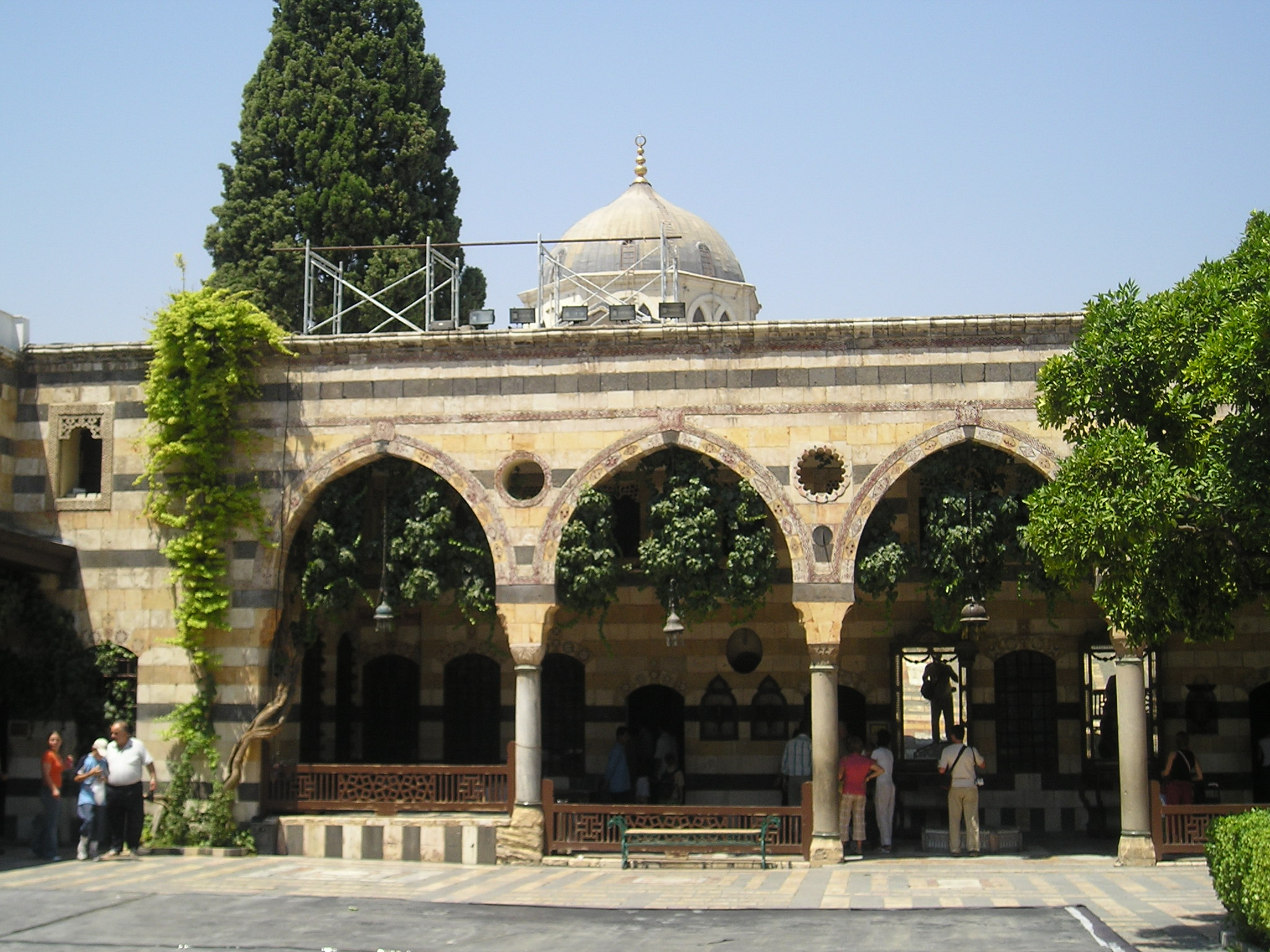
The northern facade of the courtyard

The palace was built during the Ottoman era over the former site of a Mamluk palace as a residence for the governor of Damascus, As'ad Pasha al-Azm during the reign of Sultan Mahmud I. Serving as a joint residence and guesthouse, the palace was a monument to 18th-century Arab architecture.

The palace was built by 800 workers in a span of three years, and the building was decorated with sophisticated and expensive decorative elements. A local Damascene barber, Shaikh Ahmad Al-Bidiri Al-Halaq recorded in his diary how "every time he [Al-Azem] heard of an antiquity or rare work of marble or porcelain, he would send someone to get it - with or without the owner's consent". After al-Azm's death, the palace continued as the home for his descendants during later generations.

While touring Damascus in 1898, Emperor Wilhelm II of Germany visited the palace.

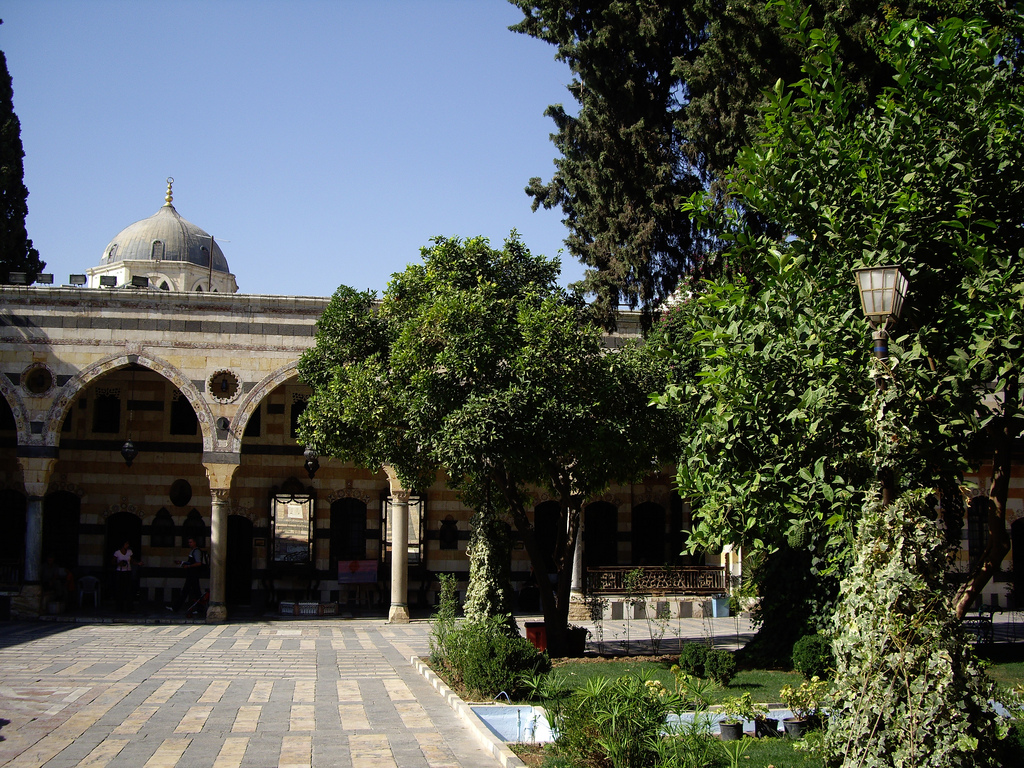
The courtyard and garden of the palace

The palace remained in the ownership of the Azm family until 1920, when the palace was sold to the French authorities. The central court or haremlek was purchased for 4000 gold pounds (after 1958 the name of the Syrian currency in English changed from "Lira" to "Pound").

During the Great Syrian Revolution, the French government shelled Damascus to repress the rebellion, and the old quarter of Damascus was also hit. This caused extensive damage to the palace, as the main reception room, the private baths and the roofs were all set on fire while the walls were destroyed. Following the end of the revolution, the French government set about reconstructing the buildings. The restoration work began immediately and was handled by architects Lucien Cavaro and Michel Ecochard. The architects conducted a simplified, less ornate reconstruction of the palace.

Following reconstruction, the French government used the palace to house the newly created French Institute, and Ecochard was commissioned to design a new house for the director of the institute. Although fairly modern, the new building blended perfectly into the 18th-century walls of the palace.

Upon Syrian independence in 1946, the French Institute left the building and the house was returned to the Azm family. Six years later, in 1951, it was purchased by the Syrian government for 100,000 Syrian pounds ($30,000), which transformed it into the Museum of Arts and Popular Traditions. Shafiq Imam was appointed as the director of the museum in 1954. The crowd for the museum's opening greatly exceeded expectations, which led Shafiq Imam to design a new staircase for the main hall to allow visitors to enter from one side and leave from another.

The palace received the Aga Khan Award for Architecture in 1983.

== Architecture ==
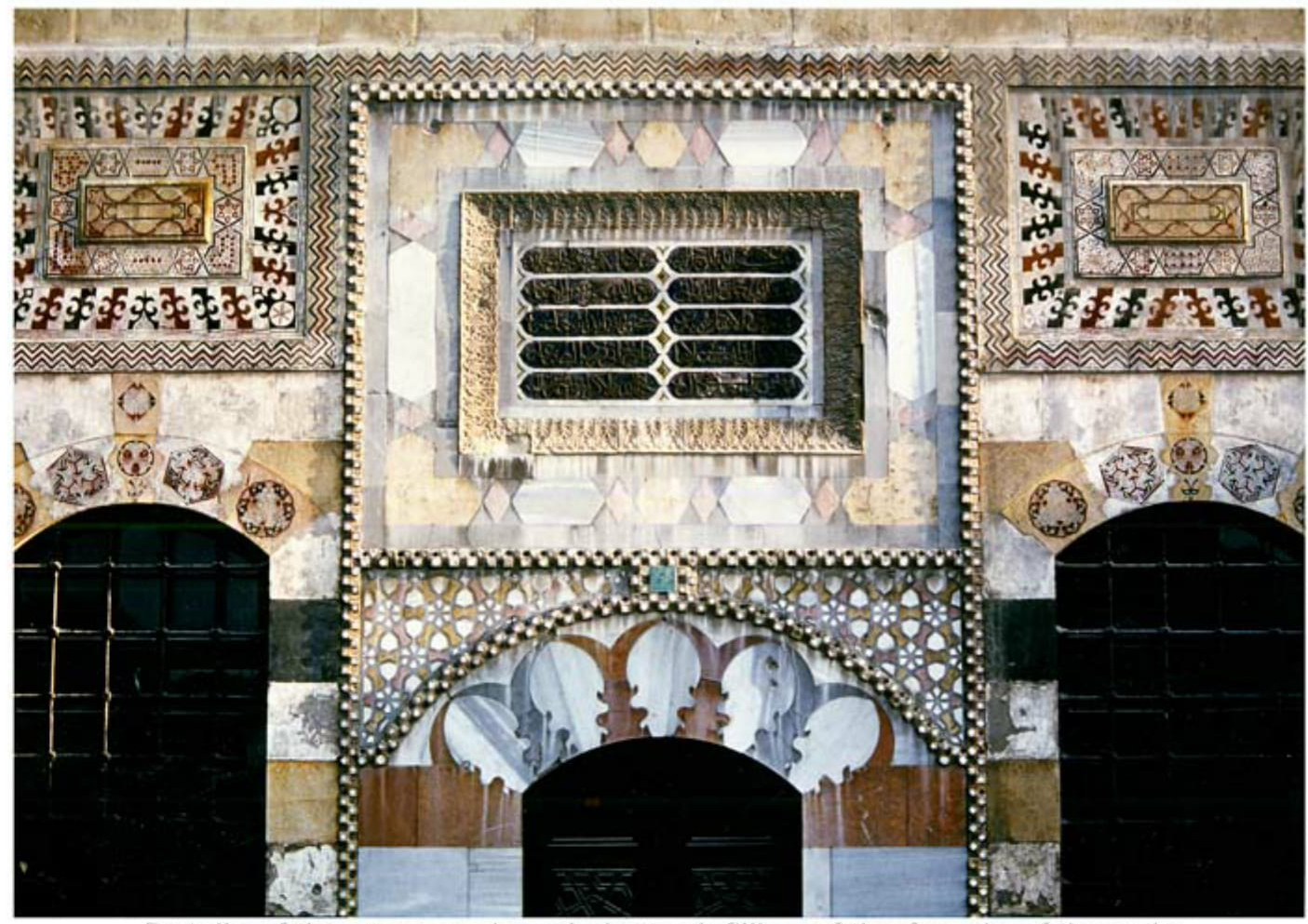
Details of the stonework in the palace

The palace has a surface of 6400 m^{2}, and its architecture is an example of Damascene traditional houses. The structure consists of several buildings and three wings: the harem, the selamlek and the khademlek. The harem is the family wing, which contained the private residences of the family and included the baths, which are a replica of the public baths (hammams) in the city on a smaller scale. The selamlek is the guest wing, comprising the formal halls, reception areas and large courtyards with a traditional cascading fountain, while in the northern part of the palace were the quarters for servants and housekeeping.

Another part of the palace are the traditional baths. They are composed of a succession of small rooms and narrow corridors leading to the main steam room in the heart of the building. Near the hammam is the main marble-floored reception hall, and behind it a second, smaller courtyard with a number of rooms now used to display various examples of traditional crafts such as glassware, copper and textiles.

Types of stones used in the building include limestone, sandstone, basalt, and marble, chosen to provide a varied decoration. The ceilings have painted wooden panels that display natural scenes.

Andrew Petersen, director of Research in Islamic Archaeology at the University of Wales Lampeter, stated that the use of ablaq (alternating courses of white limestone and black basalt) in this building is a "characteristic of the monumental masonry of Damascus."

== Museum of Arts and Popular Traditions ==
The Museum of Arts and Popular Traditions contains, among others, a collection of Syrian traditional costumes, most of which have been reproduced by the Syrian visual artist Ziad Zukkari.

== See also ==
- Ablaq
- Azem Palace (Hama)
- Bayt Farhi
- Maktab Anbar
