= Ziad Zukkari =

Syrian artist (1926-2014)

- زياد زكاري
- Born: 1926; Damascus, Syria
- Died: November 11, 2014; Damascus, Syria
- Known for: Painting, drawing, calligraphy
- Movement: Figurative
- Awards: Silver medal at the PHILATEC '64 international exhibition, at the Grand Palais, Paris, 1964

Ahmad Ziad Zukkari (Ziad Zukkari) (Arabic: زياد زكاري), (1926 – 11 September 2014) was a Syrian modern artist, painter and calligrapher. He was mainly a figurative painter who specialised in traditional scenes that represent traditional architecture and costumes. He also executed postage stamps. He painted most Syrian monuments and costumes. He was active starting in the mid-XIXth century, and was "the first to document the Syrian cultural heritage... omitting neither a comma nor a period." The historian Muhammad Bashir Zuhdi (1927–2020) stated that Zukkari "replaced the photographic camera with brushes". He painted the old souqs and khans, the monuments of Palmyra, and old popular costumes. The artist and art critique Adib Makhzoum stated that Zukkari is "an important source for documenting local costumes".

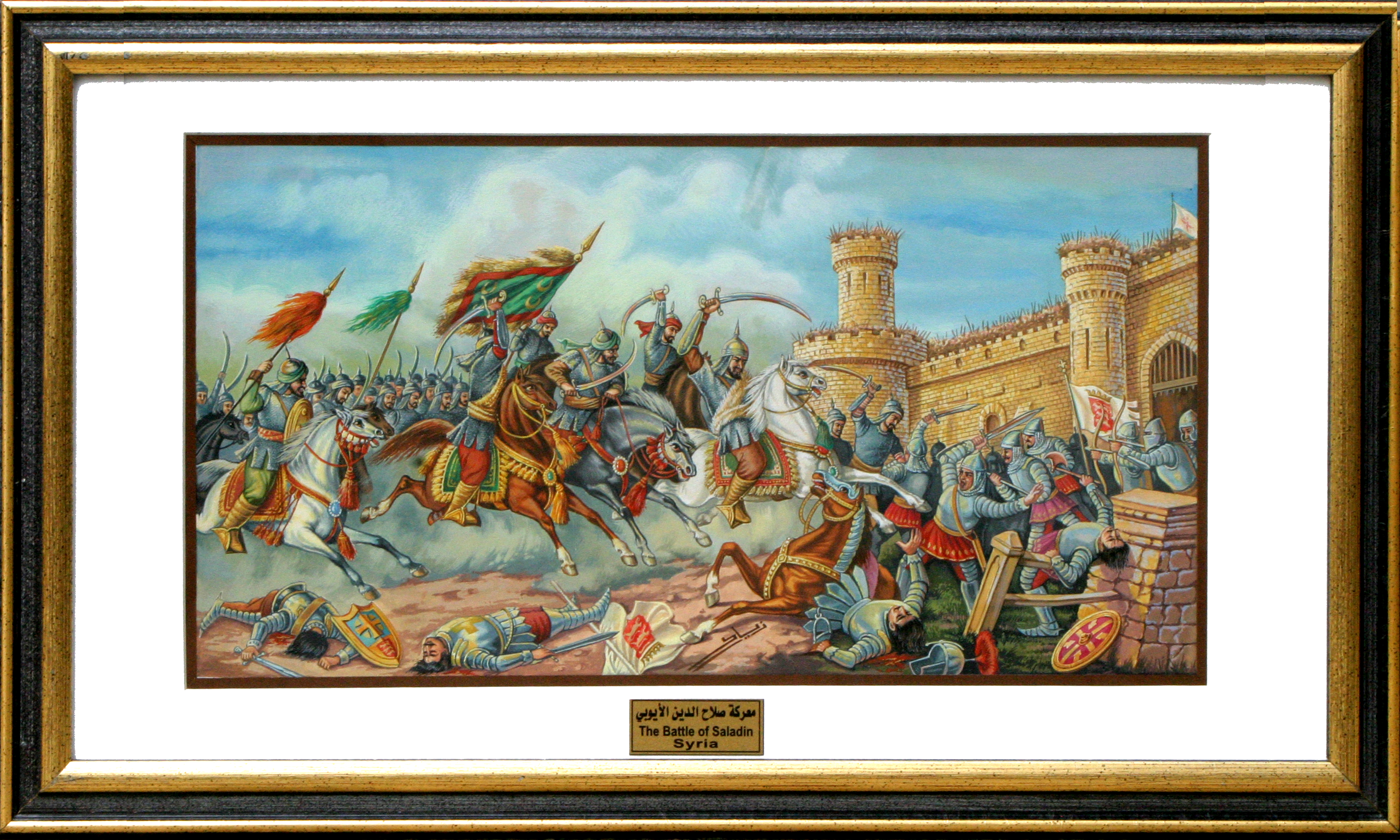
Battle of Saladin, Syria, by Zukkari

== Biography ==
Ziad Zukkari was born in 1926 in Damascus. At age eight, he started drawing, with white or coloured chalk, family trips and scenes of daily life on the walls of his family house in Douma. Later, his family left Douma to settle in Damascus, in the neighborhood of Al Bahsa Al Baraniyah, in front of the Al Tausiyah mosque (peacocks mosque), where many artists and calligraphers are living. He discovered the atelier of the painter Akram Khalqi located close to Arnous avenue in the neighborhood of Al-Salihiya, and he spent hours there.

While he was an employee with the Syrian Ministry of Culture, he made study trips in all governorates in order to systematically document the national heritage.

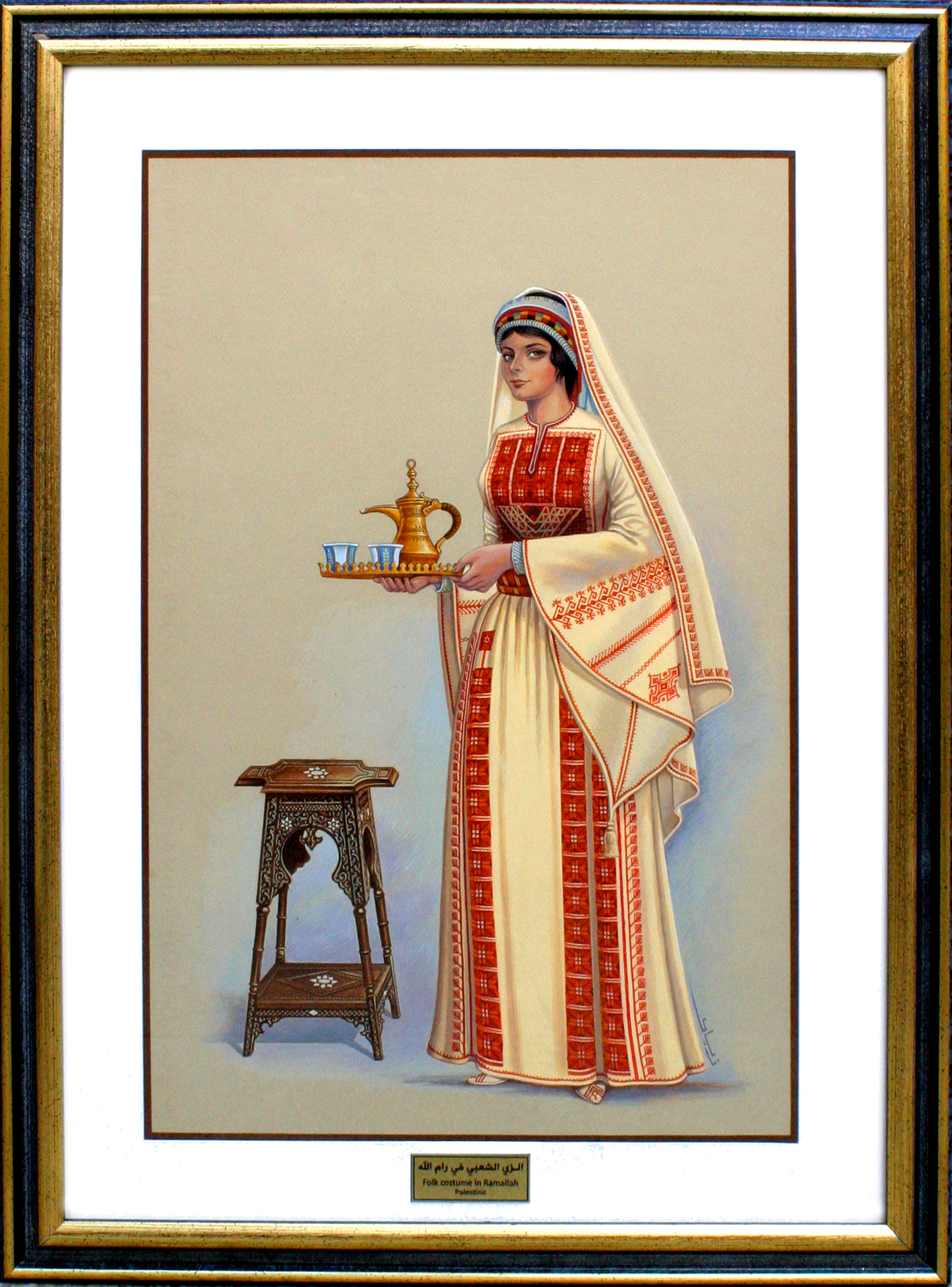
Traditional costume of Ramallah, in Palestine, by Zukkari

== Works ==
When Zukkari was a teenager, he participated in a fine arts exhibition in Damascus with a charcoal representation of a tiger hunting scene in ancient India. While the head of state (under French mandate), Taj al-Din al-Hasani, was delivering a speech during the inauguration ceremony, he made his portrait with pencil. An assistant of the president took the portrait and gave it to the president, and the next morning the portrait was published on the front page of the newspaper Al-Istiqlal Al-Arabi with the author's name and some words of encouragement. From then on, he would never stop drawing.

As a teenager, Zukkari found in a magazine a reproduction of a young lady in traditional costume from the region of Hauran, and he noticed many imperfections. He went to the Al-Azm Palace in Damascus and photographed traditional costumes, and later reproduced them with high precision in his atelier.

Zukkari made hundreds of trips in his country, including to the most remote small villages of the north. He met their inhabitants and documented their traditions. The journalist Al-Khaldi stated that he is a reference like no other for researchers in regional costumes and handicrafts. The artist Mamdouh Kashlan considered him a "master of representation of cultural heritage".

Zukkari's main contribution was to represent folk costumes in their context, by including on his canvas local monuments, whether archaeologic or historic, and handicrafts such as objects used for traditional Arabic coffee. He painted archaeological and other historic sites in Damascus, Palmyra, Hama, Homs, Deir ez-Zor and As-Suwayda. In particular, he painted the Umayyad Mosque in Damascus, the Citadel of Aleppo and the famous norias of Hama. He was also invited to Libya to reproduce men and women's traditional costumes.

Specialised in traditional costume painting, Zukkari participated in February 1986 in an international exhibition in Paris under the auspices of the World Tourism Organization, held on the occasion of the seventh World Tourism Day. During this exhibition, dedicated to the theme "Tourism: a vital force for world peace", he exhibited reproductions of traditional costumes from various governorates of Syria. In the wake of this exhibition, some of his canvases were exhibited at Le Méridien hotel of Paris on the occasion of the day of Syrian gastronomy.

Since the onset of his career, he tried to systematically represent the Syrian traditional costumes, especially those that were exhibited in the Al-Azm Palace of Damascus.

Zukkari also painted a collection of canvases representing Palestinian as well as Libyan costumes.

Zukkari drew postal stamps as well as fiscal stamps (fees) and stamps for the Engineers Syndicate (stamps for approval of engineering designs). In 1957, on the occasion of the national day of the commemoration of the independence of Syria, he designed a postal stamp representing the President of the Republic Shukri al-Quwatli. From 5 to 21 June 1964, he participated in the international philately exhibition PHILATEC '64 in the Grand Palais in Paris, and won the silver medal. For the Egyptian Post he designed an Egyptian stamp on the occasion of the nationalisation of the Suez Canal company in 1956, for which he received an award from Egyptian President Gamal Abdel Nasser. For the Syrian Post, he designed in 1973 a stamp representing the entry of Khalid ibn al-Walid in Damascus, and he created a Syrian stamp commemorating the 1100th anniversary of the death of the Arab surgeon Abu Bakr al-Razi. It is estimated that he created several dozen stamps.

A quasi-exhaustive collection of paintings representing with a perfect realism well-known monuments and sites attracted the interest of producers of postcards. Hence, Zukkari was also known as an illustrator of postcards at the beginning of the 1990s. Those postcards have become the most popular of Syria and are now found across the world.

He also painted official portraits, such as Gamal Abdel Nasser and Hafez al-Assad.

In September 2017, three years after his death, a retrospective exhibition was organised in his memory at the Cultural Center of Mazzeh.

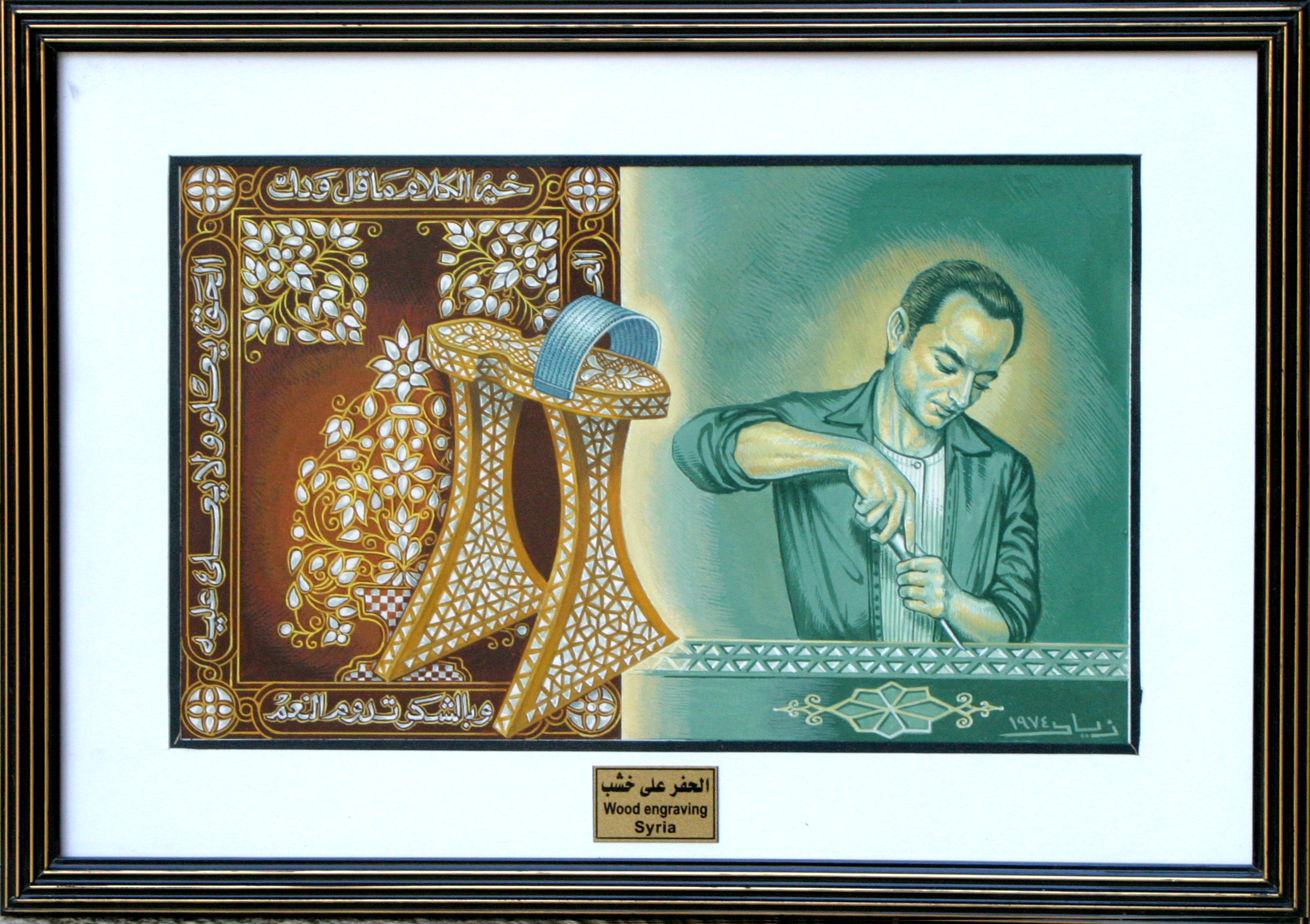
Wood carving by Zukkari

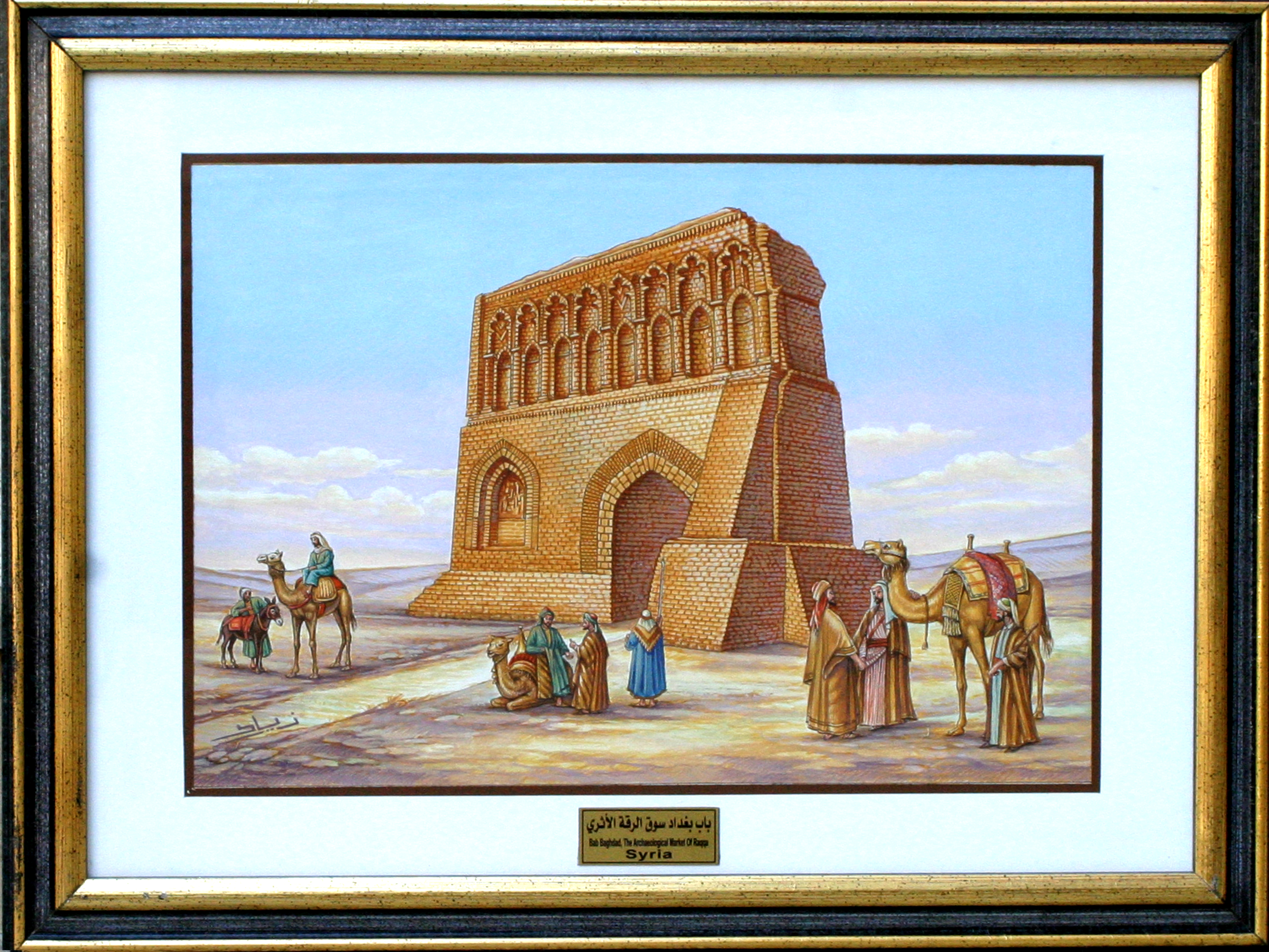
The Baghdad Gate, historic market of Raqqa, by Zukkari

== Awards ==
- Certificate from the Tishreen University for his contribution to scientific research, 5 October 1991
- Certificate from the Adham Ismail Centre for Plastic Arts, in recognition of his artistic activity in documenting cultural heritage, 7 September 2005
