= Ablaq =

Construction in stone of alternating colours

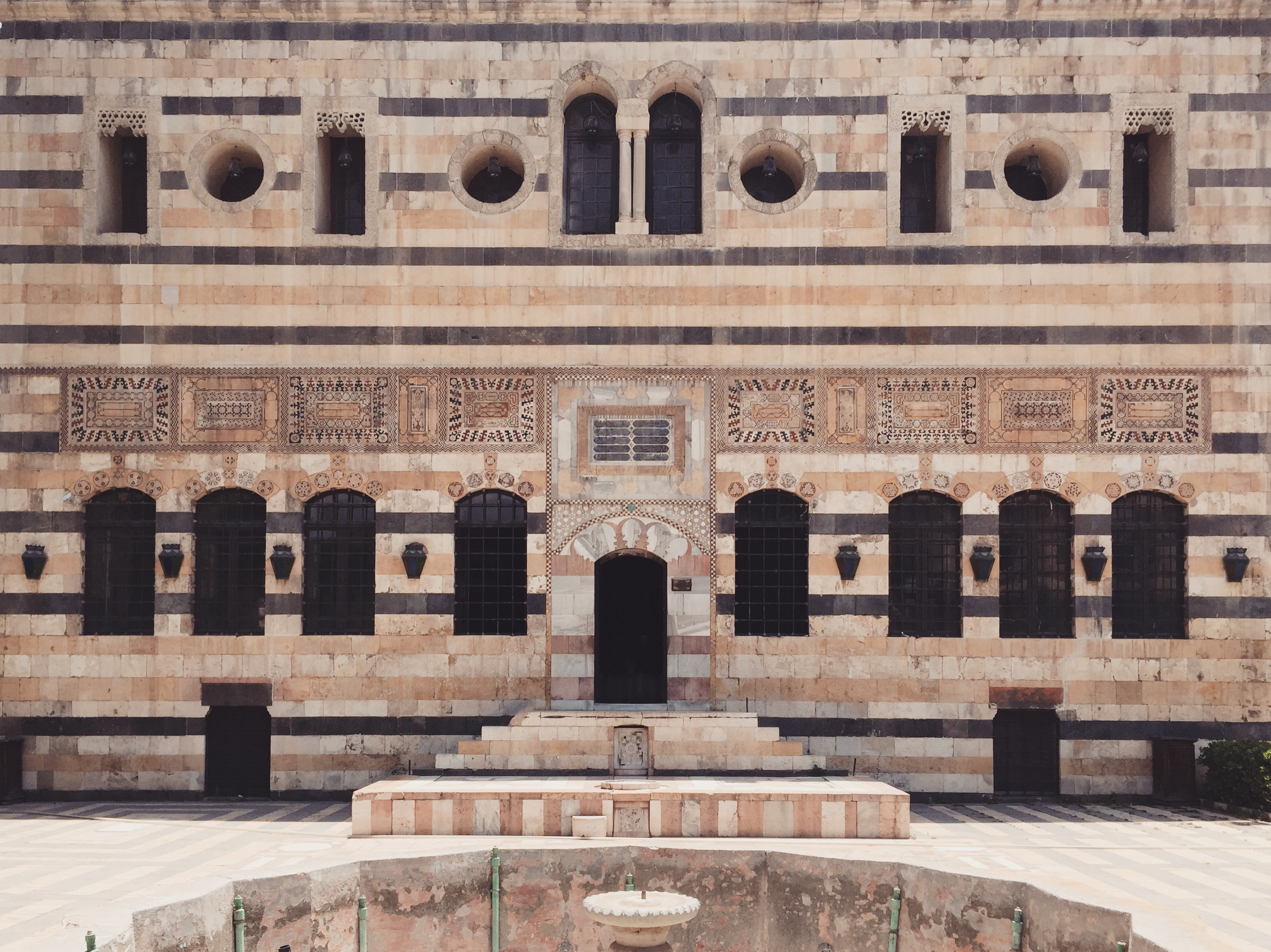
Reception hall of Azem Palace in Damascus, Syria, using ablaq technique (18th century)

Ablaq (Arabic: أبلق; particolored; literally 'piebald') is an architectural technique involving alternating or fluctuating rows of light and dark stone. It is an Arabic term describing a technique associated with Islamic architecture in the Arab world. The technique is used primarily for decorative effect. It may have its origins in earlier Byzantine architecture in the region, where alternating layers of white stone and orange brick were used in construction. Its use began early in the history of Islamic architecture.

== Origins ==
The ablaq decorative technique is thought to possibly be a derivative from the ancient Byzantine Empire, whose architecture used alternate sequential runs of light colored ashlar stone and darker colored orange brick. The first clearly recorded use of ablaq masonry is found in repairs to the north wall of the Great Mosque of Damascus in 1109.

The technique may have originated in Syria, where the local stone supply may have encouraged the use of alternating courses of light and dark stone. In the southern part of Syria there is abundance of black basalt as well as white-colored limestone. The supplies of each are about equal, so it was natural that masonry techniques of balanced proportions were used.

== Use in Islamic architecture ==
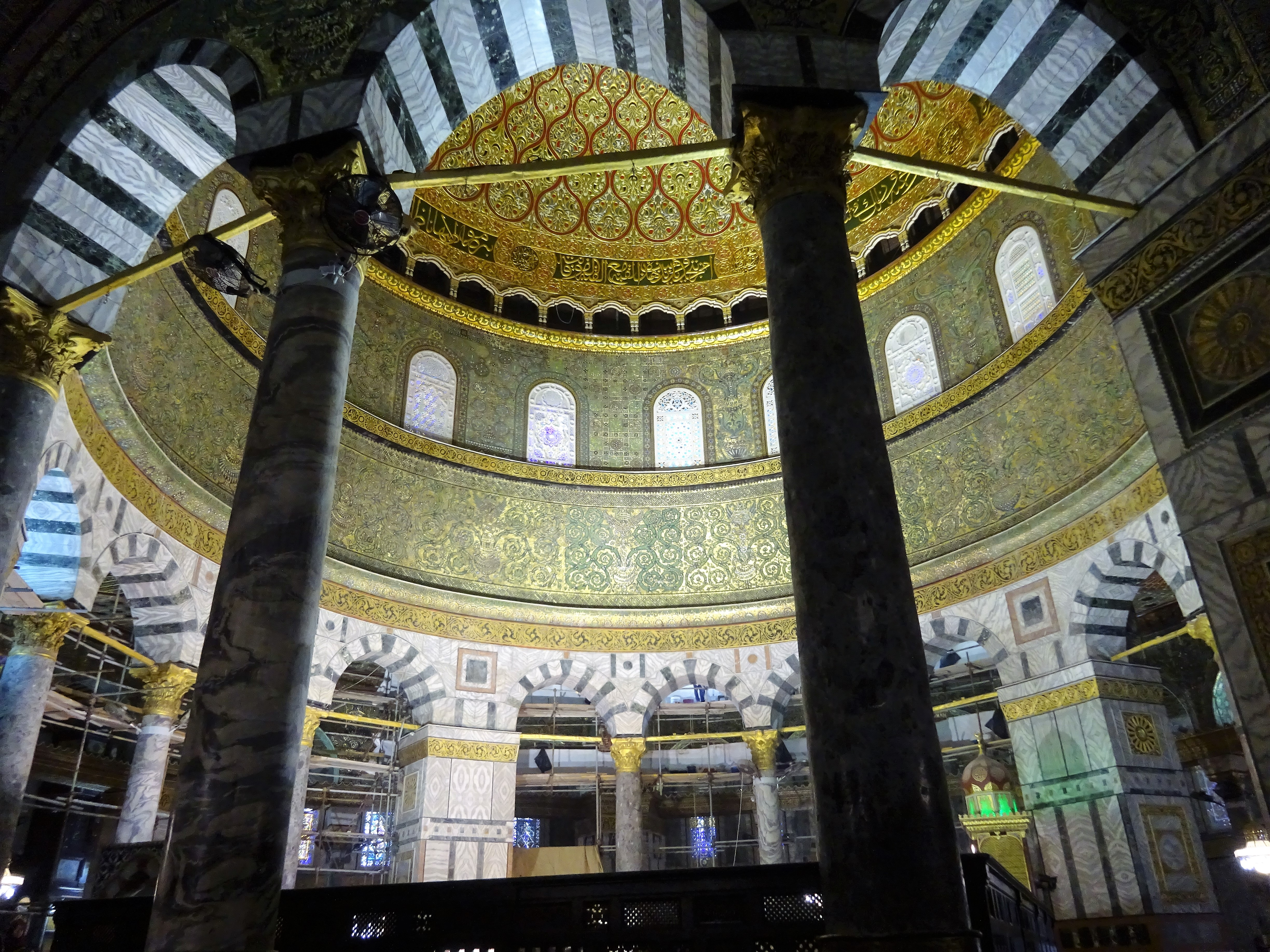
Interior of the Dome of the Rock, originally built in the 7th century, with ablaq used in the arches

The Dome of the Rock in Jerusalem, originally built in the late 7th century during the Umayyad period, features ablaq light and dark stone voussoirs in the arches of its inner colonnade. The origins of the marble ablaq treatments at the Dome of the Rock are controversial, with some scholars theorizing them to be from the original construction, and some saying they were later additions (and differing then as to the dates and identity of the builders). The alternating red and white masonry in the voussoirs of arches at the Great Mosque of Córdoba—built in the late 8th century and expanded on up till the 10th century—is another early example of such a technique, which could be related to earlier examples in Jerusalem and Damascus that the Umayyad rulers of Córdoba were familiar with. Andrew Petersen, a scholar of Islamic art and archeology, states that ablaq (alternating courses of white limestone and black basalt) is "a characteristic of the monumental masonry of Damascus."

Ablaq masonry appears around the dome in front of the prayer hall of the Zaytuna Mosque in Tunis, which was added during a renovation by the Zirids in 991. This feature was not seen in earlier Aghlabid architecture in this region but may have been a continuation of earlier local techniques from the Byzantine era.

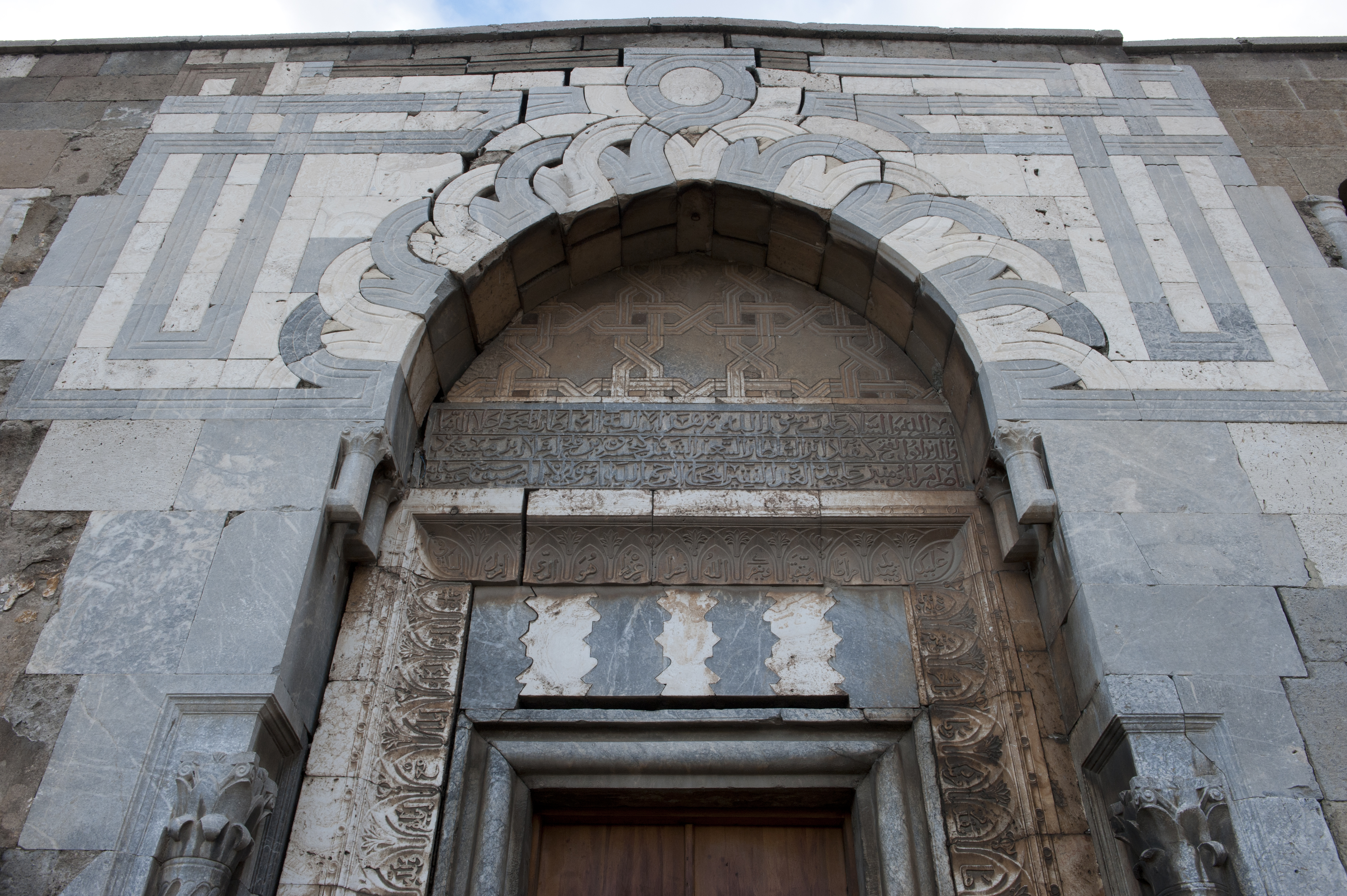
Ablaq stonework on the Alaeddin Mosque in Konya (13th century)

Ablaq appears in some 12th and 13th-century buildings in Diyarbakir built under the Artuqids, as well as in some late Ayyubid buildings in Damascus. It also appears in the portals of some 13th-century Seljuk monuments in Konya, such as the Alaeddin Mosque and the Karatay Madrasa, possibly due to the influence of Syrian craftsmen.

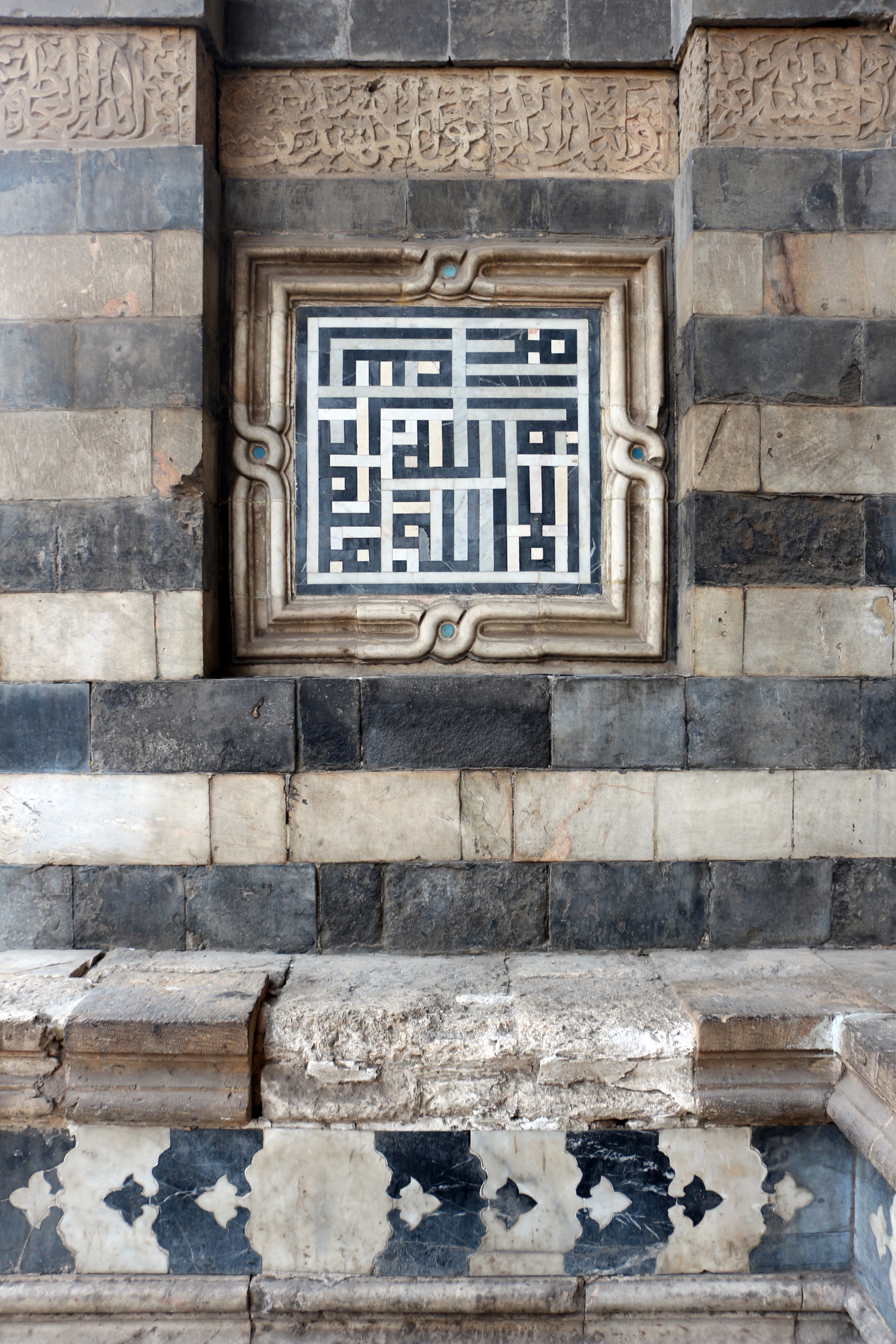
Detail of ablaq masonry, including "joggled" masonry (bottom), (Note: The square panel in the center is an Arabic inscription in Square Kufic executed in inlaid black and white marble.) at the entrance of the al-Mu'ayyad Mosque in Cairo (15th century, Mamluk period)

Ablaq became a prominent feature of Mamluk architecture in Syria, Egypt and Palestine in the 14th and 15th centuries. (Note: In addition to the many examples in present-day Egypt, Syria, and Palestine, a Mamluk-era caravanserai (khan) at Aqaba, Jordan, also contains a horseshoe arch with ablaq masonry.) During this period, black and white stone were often used as well as red brick in recurring rows, giving a three colored striped building. Ablaq masonry supplemented other decorative techniques such as the use of "joggled" voussoirs in arches, where stones of alternating colours were cut into interlocking shapes.

In 1266 the Mamluk sultan al-Zahir Baybars al-Bunduqdari built a palace in Damascus known as the Qasr al-Ablaq ("Ablaq Palace"), which was constructed with alterations of light and dark masonry. This name shows that the term ablaq was in regular usage for this type of masonry in the 13th century.

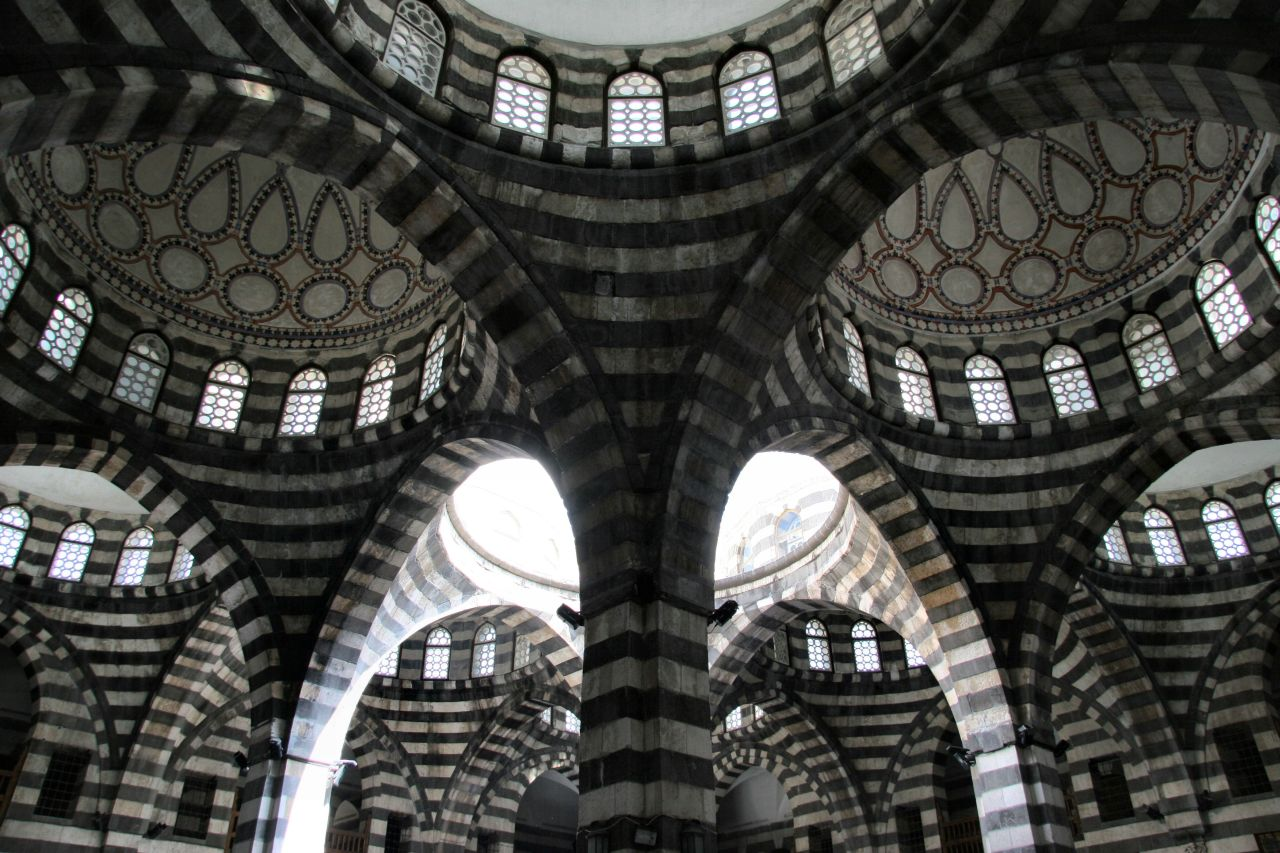
Khan As'ad Pasha in Damascus, Syria (18th century)

Construction with alternating layers of brick and stone was often used in early Ottoman architecture in Anatolia and the Balkans, but it fell out of fashion in later Ottoman imperial architecture. The traditional ablaq technique continued to be used regionally in the architecture of Ottoman Syria (16th century and after). Examples in Damascus include the Sulaymaniyya Takiyya (16th century), the Azm Palace (18th century), and the Khan As'ad Pasha (18th century).

Alternating black and white marble also became a feature of Tunisian architecture during its Ottoman period (16th to 19th centuries). Abdelaziz Daoulatli states that this habit began earlier in the Hafsid period, probably in the 14th century. Georges Marçais suggests that it was encouraged by the influence of the Mamluk style in Egypt.

== Use in Christian Europe ==
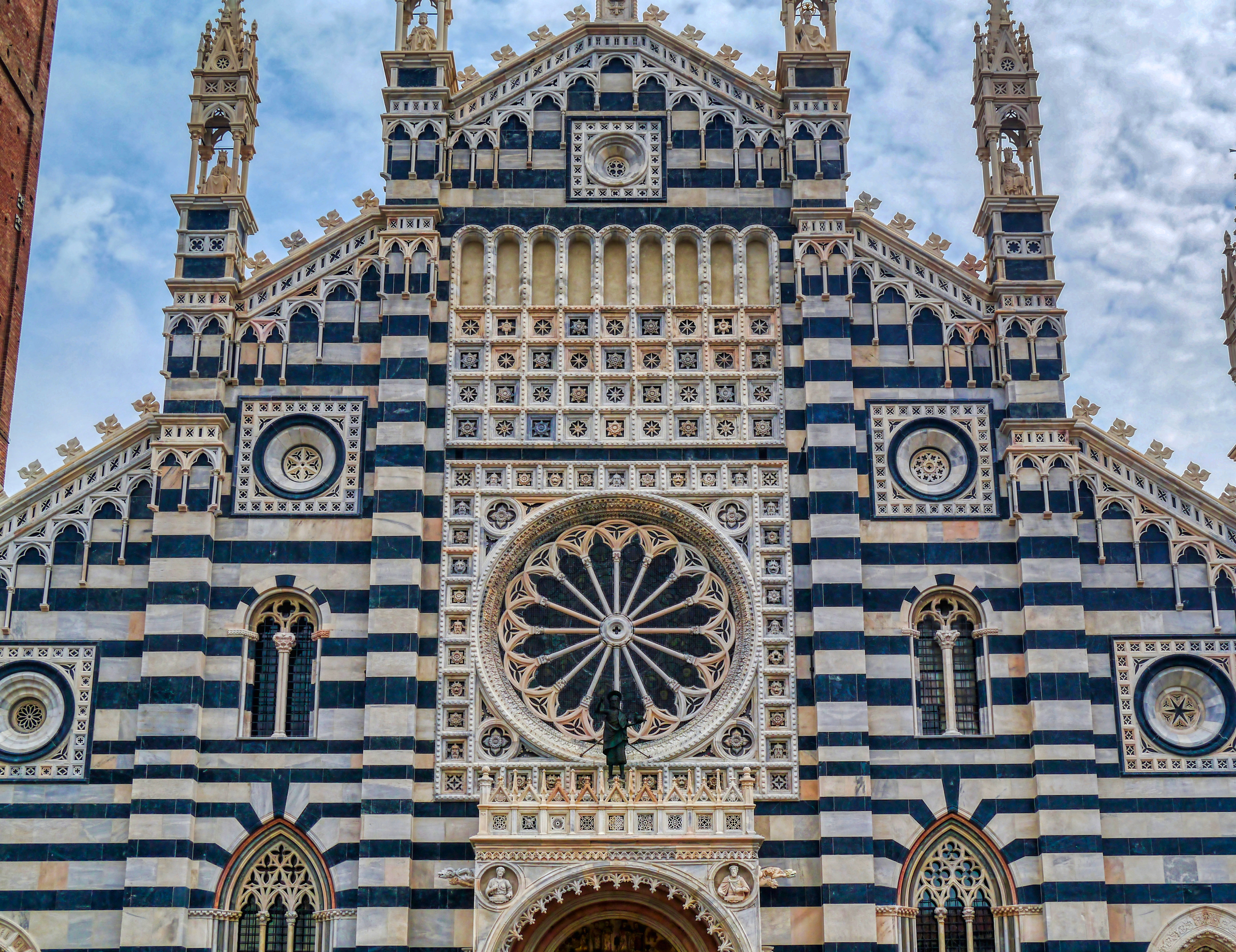
Alternating white and dark stone at the Monza Cathedral in Italy (14th century)

The technique of alternating light and dark stone constructions also appeared in Christian Europe around the mid 12th century, becoming present in architecture throughout much of the Mediterranean region more generally. It is uncertain whether this development in Christian Europe occurred independently or was influenced by existing examples in Syria. Notable examples include the 13th-century cathedrals of Monza, Siena, and Orvieto, as well as a palace in Genoa.

Pisan ecclesiastical monuments—particularly the Cathedral of Pisa and Church of San Sepolcro (commenced building 1113)—used ablaq, not simple "black and white in revetment" between the conquest of Jerusalem in the First Crusade (1099) and the completion of the latter ca. 1130. Various architectural motifs—ablaq, the zigzag arch, and voussoir (rippled and plain) were used. According to scholar Terry Allen, these embellishments were a direct appropriation of Muslim architecture, resulting from pilgrimage to Jerusalem and the wars in the Levant from resulting from the First Crusade. Visitors to Jerusalem could see ablaq at the Dome of the Rock and at the Church of the Holy Sepulchre, as well as other examples that may no longer be extant. Thus zigzags and ablaq became part of the repertoire of Romanesque architecture.

== See also ==
- Ablaq Palace (former palace in Cairo)
