= 1914 Ottoman census =

Census of the Ottoman Empire

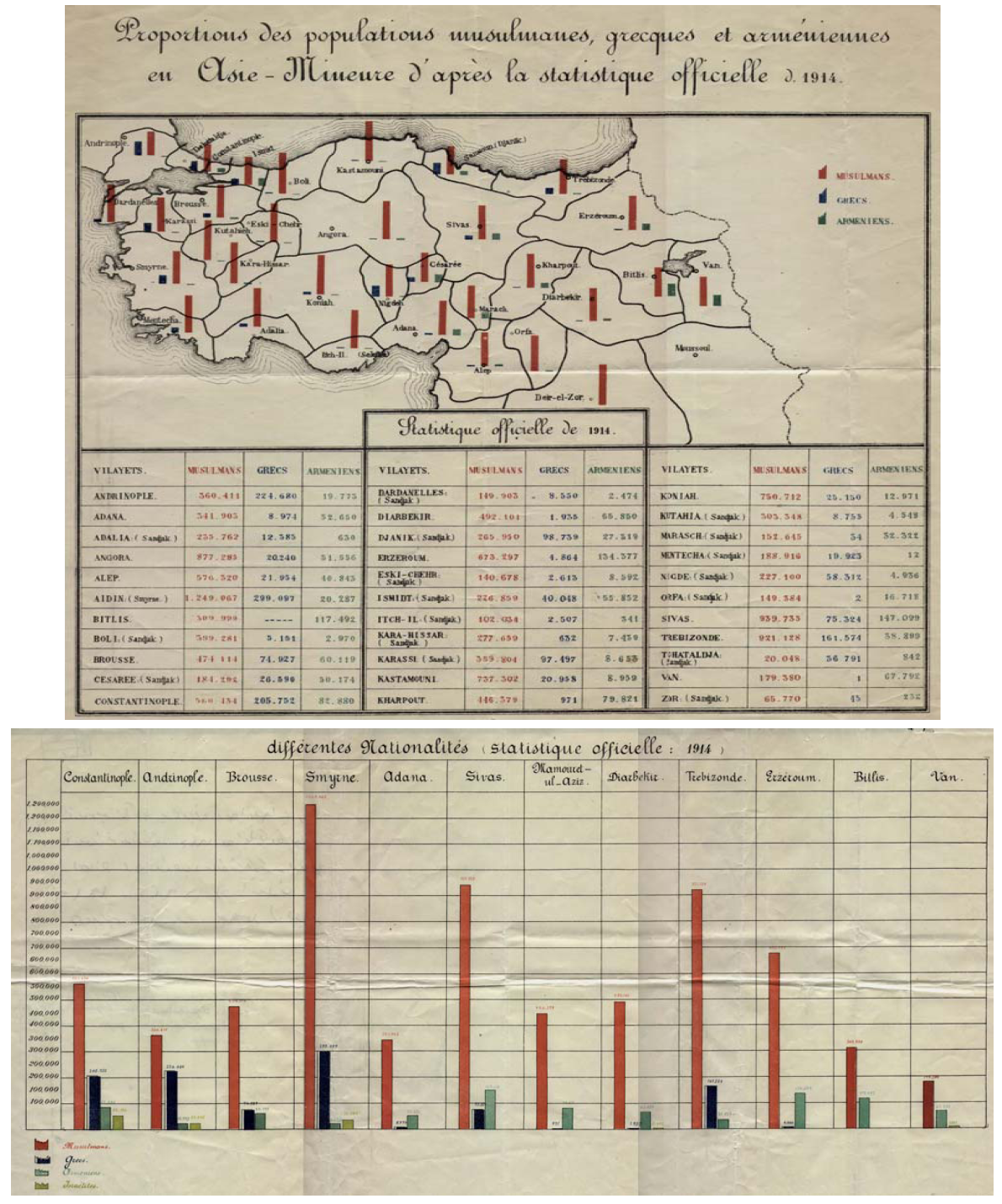
1914, Muslim, Greek and Armenian population.

The 1914 Ottoman census was published as the Memalik-i-Osmaniyyenin 1330 Senesi Nüfus Istatistiki. (Note: Population statistics of the Ottoman state in the year 1914 in Istanbul, 1919) According to the introduction, the statistics were derived from data collected during the 1905–06 Ottoman census, adjusted to reflect demographic and territorial changes.

The 1914 census data reflected major changes in the territorial boundaries and administrative divisions of the Ottoman state. The 1914 Ottoman general election provided a significant source of population data. The Empire's total population in the census was recorded as 18,520,015. The grand total for 1914 showed a "net gain" of 1,131,454 people from the 1905-06 Ottoman census survey. The data reflected the loss of territory and population in Europe due to the Balkan Wars, as the total net gain within the Ottoman state’s population was 3,496,068.

The census underestimated non-Muslim populations. For example, in Diyarbekir, the Armenian population was reported at 73,226 in the 1914 Ottoman census, but in September 1915, Reshid Bey announced that he had deported 120,000 Armenians from the province.

== Census data ==
Vilayet	Muslims	Greek Orthodox	Armenian Orthodox	Jews	Greek Catholics	Armenian Catholics	Protestants	Latins	Syriacs	Chaldeans	Jacobites	Maronites	Samarians	Nestorians	Yazidis	Gypsies	Druze	Cossacks	Serbs	Wallachians	Total	
Balkans
Çatalca^{1}	20,048	36,797	1,326	1,480	-	-	-	?														59,756
Edirne	360,417	224,459	25,725	22,515	21	48	115	?														631,094
Constantinople	560,434	205,375	134,962	52,126	387	9,918	1,213	2,905	?													909,978
Anatolia
Adana	341,903	8,537	50,139	66	437	2,511	5,036	?														411,023
Ankara	877,285	20,226	44,507	1,026	14	7,069	2,381	?														953,817
Antalya^{1}	235,762	12,385	630	250	-	-	-	?														249,686
Aydın	1,249,067	299,096	19,395	35,041	1	892	479	?														1,608,742
Bitlis	309,999	-	114,704	-	-	2,788	1,640	?														437,479
Bolu^{1}	399,281	5,146	2,961	20	5	9	2	?														408,648
Canik^{1}	265,950	98,739	27,058	27	-	261	1,257	?														393,302
Diyarbekir	492,101	1,822	55,890	2,085	113	9,960	7,376	?														619,825
Erzurum	673,297	4,859	125,657	10	5	8,720	2,241	?														815,432
Eskişehir^{1}	140,578	2,613	8,276	728	-	316	215	?														152,726
İçil^{1}	102,034	2,500	341	10	7	-	-	?														105,194
İzmit^{1}	226,859	40,048	55,403	428	-	449	1,937	?														325,153
Kale-i Sultaniye^{1}	149,903	8,541	2,474	3,642	9	-	67	?														165,815
Karahisar-i Sahip^{1}	277,659	632	7,437	7	-	2	9	?														285,820
Karesi^{1}	359,804	97,497	8,544	362	-	109	51	?														472,970
Kastamonu	737,302	20,958	8,959	8	-	-	-	?														767,227
Kayseri^{1}	184,292	26,590	48,659	-	-	1,515	2,018	?														263,074
Konya	750,712	25,071	12,971	4	79	-	254	?														789,308
Kütahya^{1}	303,348	8,755	3,910	-	-	638	-	?														316,894
Mamuret-ül-Aziz	446,379	971	76,070	-	-	3,751	8,043	?														538,227
Maraş^{1}	152,645	11	27,842	251	23	4,480	6,111	?														192,555
Menteşe^{1}	188,916	19,923	12	1,615	-	-	-	?														210,874
Niğde^{1}	227,100	58,312	4,890	-	-	45	769	?														291,117
Sivas	939,735	75,324	143,406	344	-	3,693	4,575	?														1,169,443
Trabzon	921,128	161,574	37,549	8	-	1,350	1,338	?														1,122,947
Urfa^{1}	149,384	2	15,161	-	865	1,557	1,652	?														170,988
Van Vilayet	179,380	1	67,792	1,383	-	-	-	?														259,141
Levant
Beyrut	648,314	87,244	1,188	15,052	24,210	277	3,823	?														824,873
Halep	576,320	13,772	35,104	12,193	8,182	5,739	8,643	?														667,790
Kudüs-i Şerif	266,044	26,035	1,310	21,259	1,086	-	1,733	?														328,168
Suriye	791,582	60,978	413	10,140	27,662	247	1,873	?														918,409
Zor^{1}	65,770	18	67	2	27	215	1	?														66,294
Total	15,044,846	1,729,738	1,161,169	187,073	62,468	67,838	65,844	24,845	54,750	4,133	13,211	6,932	47,406	164	8,091	6,957	11,169	7,385	1,006	14,908	82	18,520,016

As a result of the substantial territorial losses in Europe suffered during the Balkan Wars, the total population of the Empire fell to 18,520,016, of whom, an even larger percentage than before—15,044,846—were counted as Muslim, with 1,729,738 as Greek Orthodox, 1,161,169 as Armenian Gregorian, 187,073 as Jewish, 68,838 as Armenian Catholic, 65,844 as Protestant, and 62,468 as Greek Catholic. No separate figures were given for Franks (foreign nationals living in the Empire).

The capital, Constantinople (Istanbul) was an important location due to expulsions from the Balkan Wars. According to the 1914 census, its population increased slightly to 909,978, excluding Franks, with 560,434 Muslims, 205,375 Greek Orthodox, 72,963 Armenian Gregorian, 52,126 Jews, 9,918 Armenian Catholics, 2,905 Roman Catholics, 1,213 Protestants, and 387 Greek Catholics.

^{1} Sanjak
