= List of Armenian territories and states =

This is a list of Armenian states, countries and regions throughout history. It includes empires, countries, states, provinces, regions and territories that have or had in the past one of the following characteristics:

- An ethnic Armenian majority or significant portion of it
- Armenians are an official, constitutional or titular nation
- Armenian as an official language or the native language of the majority
- An Armenian ruling class or dynasty

== Prehistoric Armenia ==
- Nairi
- Hayasa-Azzi

== Historical political entities ==
=== Early ===
- Kingdom of Urartu (860 BC–590 BC)
- Orontid Armenia (6th century BC – 2nd century BC)
- Kingdom of Armenia (331 BC–428 AD)
- Kingdom of Sophene (3rd century – 94 BC)
- Kingdom of Commagene (163 BC – 72 AD)

=== Medieval ===
- Emirate of Armenia (637–884)
- Bagratid Armenia (885–1045)
- Vaspurakan Kingdom (908–1021) - a regional kingdom in Vaspurakan region
- Kingdom of Vanand (963–1064) - a regional kingdom in Kars region
- Kingdom of Lori (979–1118) - a regional kingdom in Lori region
- Kingdom of Syunik (987–1170) - a regional kingdom in Syunik region
- Kingdom of Artsakh (1000–1261) - a regional kingdom in Artsakh region
- Armenian Kingdom of Cilicia (1198–1375)
- Zakarid Armenia (1201–1330s)
- Principality of Khachen (11th century – 1750)

== Modern political entities ==
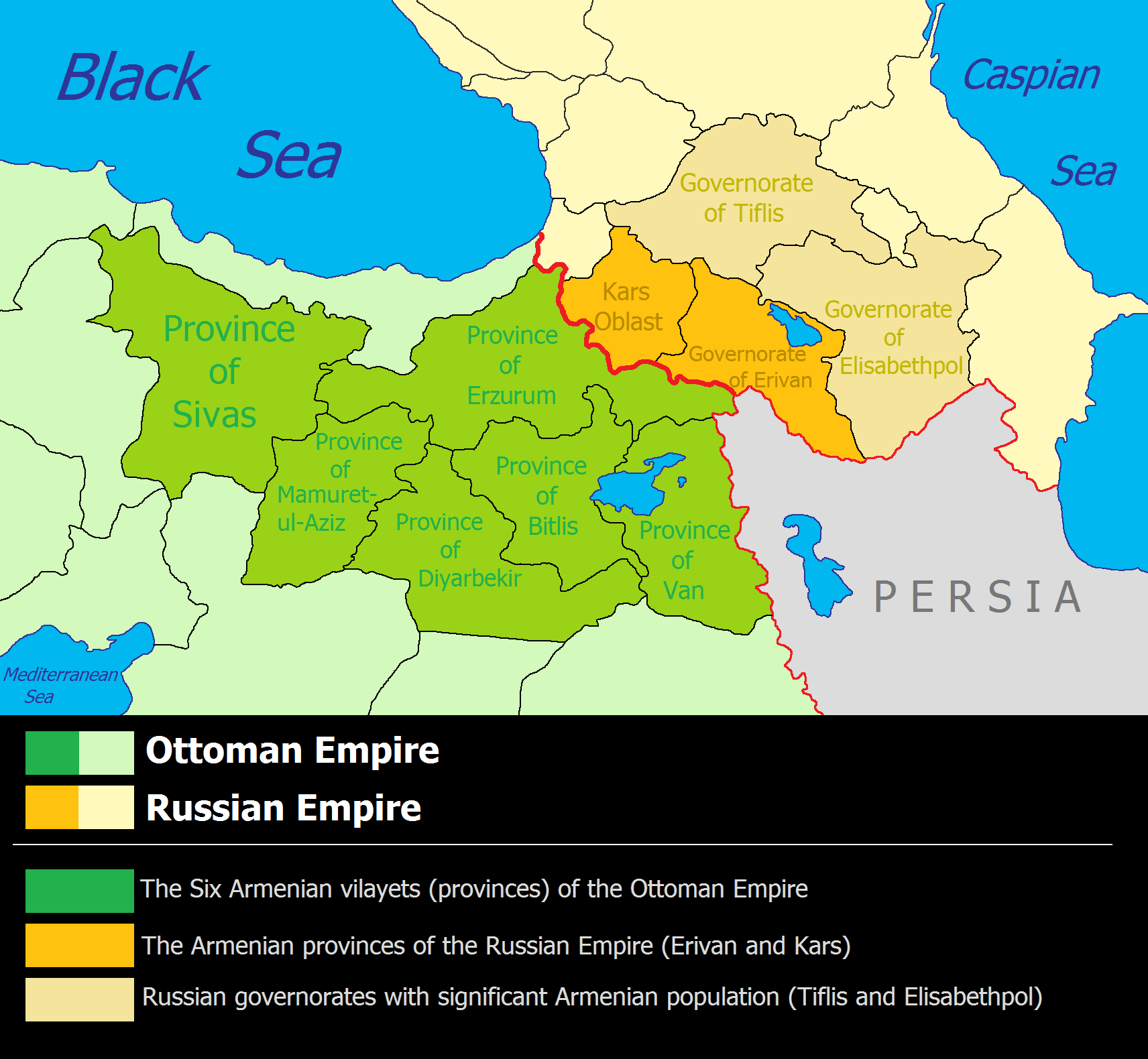
Early 20th century: Western (Ottoman) and Eastern (Russian) Armenias.

=== Ottoman Empire ===
Before 1864
- Erzurum Eyalet
- Adana Eyalet
- Eyalet of Diyarbekir
- Kars Eyalet
- Eyalet of Childir
- Eyalet of Van
1864-1923

Six Armenian vilayets

1. Bitlis Vilayet
2. Erzurum Vilayet
3. Diyarbekir Vilayet
4. Mamuretülaziz Vilayet
5. Van Vilayet
6. Sivas Vilayet

- Adana Vilayet
- Ankara Vilayet
- Trebizond Vilayet

=== Russian Empire ===
- Armenian Oblast (1828–1840) – about half of the population
- Erivan Governorate (1850–1917) – 3/5 of the population
- Kars Oblast (1878–1918) – about 1/3 of the population, plurality
- Elizavetpol Governorate (1868–1917) – about 1/3 of the population; majority in the Shusha uezd, significant part of the population of the Kazakh and Zangezur uezds
- Tiflis Governorate (1847–1917) – more than 1/4 of the population; majority in the Akhalkalaki uezd, plurality in the Borchaly uezd, second ethnic group in the Akhaltsikhe uezd

=== World War I and later years ===
- Republic of Van (1915–1918) in the Armenian-inhabited areas of the Ottoman Empire occupied by the Russian Empire
- Special Transcaucasian Committee (1917) included the Armenian inhabited regions of the Russian Empire
- Transcaucasian Commissariat (1917–1918) included the Armenian inhabited regions of the Russian Empire
- Transcaucasian Democratic Federative Republic (1918) included the Armenian inhabited regions of the Russian Empire
- First Republic of Armenia (1918–1920) was first-ever modern Armenian state
- Republic of Mountainous Armenia (1921) was formed in Syunik, Vayots Dzor and some parts of Nagorno-Karabakh

=== Soviet Union ===
- Armenian Soviet Socialist Republic (1920–1991)
- Nagorno-Karabakh Autonomous Oblast within Azerbaijan Soviet Socialist Republic (1923–1991) – about 3/4 of the total population

=== Post-Soviet states ===
- Republic of Artsakh (1991–2023) - unrecognized state, de jure part of Azerbaijan Republic

== Present political entities ==
This is the list of the current states and regions where Armenians are in absolute or relative ethnic majority, are one of the constitutional or recognized peoples or Armenian language is official:

- Armenia

== See also ==
- United Armenia, irredentist claim to regions historically and currently populated by Armenians
