= Adana vilayet =

First-level administrative division of the Ottoman Empire

ولايت اطنه Vilâyet-i Adana
- Vilayet of the Ottoman Empire
- 1869–1922
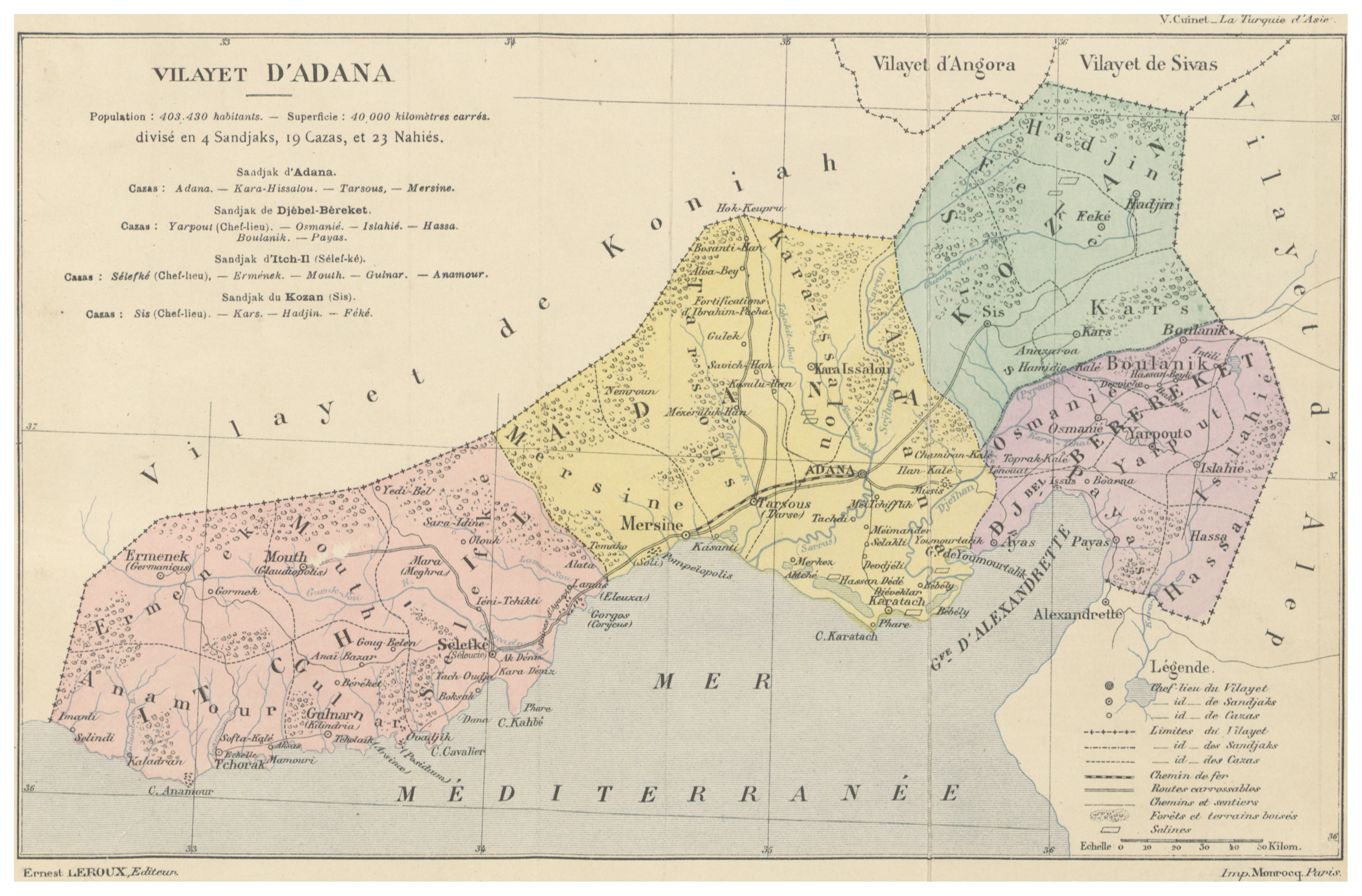
- The Adana Vilayet in 1892
- Capital: Adana
- Area
  - Coordinates: 36.87°N 34.58°E
- History
  - Established: 1869
  - Disestablished: 1922
Preceded by
Adana Eyalet
Succeeded by
Adana Province
Cebel-i Bereket Province
Mersin Province
İçel Province
- Today part of: Turkey

The Vilayet of Adana (Ottoman Turkish: ولايت اطنه, Vilâyet-i Adana) was a first-level administrative division (vilayet) of the Ottoman Empire in the south-east of Asia Minor, which encompassed the region of Cilicia. It was established in May 1869. Adana Vilayet bordered with Konya Vilayet (in west), Ankara Vilayet and Sivas Vilayet (in north), and Haleb Vilayet (in east and south). Adana Vilayet corresponds to the modern region of Çukurova in Turkey.

== Demographics ==
At the beginning of the 20th century, it reportedly had an area of 14,494 square miles (37,540 km^{2}), while the preliminary results of the first Ottoman census of 1885 (published in 1908) gave the population as 402,439. The accuracy of the population figures ranges from "approximate" to "merely conjectural" depending on the region from which they were gathered.

== Economic history ==
It was described by the 1911 Encyclopædia Britannica as rich in unexploited mineral wealth in the mountainous districts, and fertile in the coast-plain, which produced cotton, rice, cereals, sugar and fruit. In 1920, the region was noted for its forested western region, which had little agricultural production. The Cilicia region was noted for its agricultural production, including wheat, barley, oats, rice, seeds, opium, sugarcane and cotton. Cotton production became more popular before World War I. In 1912, the region produced 110,000 bales of cotton and 35,000 tons of cottonseed. Pyrite was mined in the region in the early 20th century.

== Administrative divisions ==
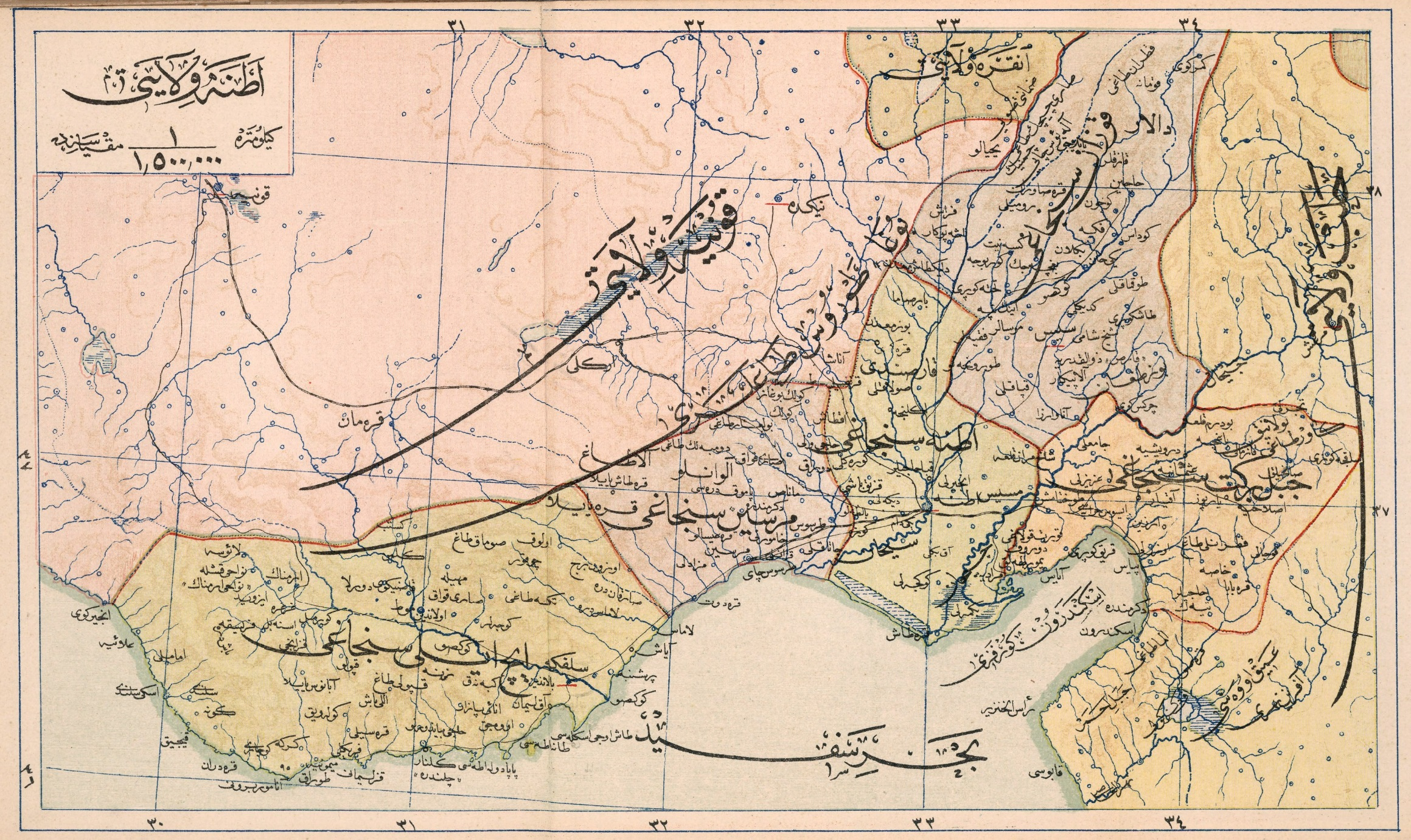
Map of subdivisions of Adana Vilayet in 1907

Sanjaks of the Vilayet and their kazas:

1. Sanjak of Adana (Adana (seat), Hamidiye, Karaisalı)
2. Sanjak of Mersin (Mersin (seat), Tarsus)
3. Sanjak of Cebel-i Bereket (Yarpuz (seat), Osmaniye, İslahiye, Bulanık, Hassa)
4. Sanjak of Kozan (Sis (seat), Hacın, Feke, Kars-ı Zülkadriye)
5. Sanjak of İçel (Silifke (seat), Anamur, Ermenek, Gülnar, Mut)

== See also ==
- Adana massacre
