= Devegeçidi Bridge =

Devegeçidi Bridge Devegeçidi Köprüsü
- Coordinates: 38°03′12″N 40°04′09.3″E
- Crosses: Devegeçidi stream
- Locale: Diyarbakır Province, Southeastern Anatolia Region, Turkey
- Other name(s): Kurdish: Pira Neqeba Deveyan

Characteristics
- Design: Arch bridge
- Material: Stone masonry and rubble
- Total length: 119.17 m (391.0 ft)
- Width: 6.40 m (21.0 ft)
- Longest span: 13.70 m (44.9 ft)
- No. of spans: 7
- Piers in water: 3

History
- Construction end: 1218

Devegeçidi Bridge, also known as Palu Bridge, Kara Köprü and Sultan Murad IV Köprüsü is a disused stone bridge of seven arches across the Devegeçidi stream 20 km (12 mi) north of Diyarbakır, in southeast Turkey, on the road to Ergani. (Note: Sinclair noted only six arches during his visit to the site. Possibly the smallest, northern arch was concealed at that time.) There is a separate bridge across the same stream that is often also called the Devegeçidi Bridge 13.5 km (8.4 mi) to the east, near the stream's confluence with the Tigris river.

There are three inscriptions on the southern portion of the bridge, one of which indicates that it was built in 1218 by the Artuqid ruler Melik Salih Nâsıreddin Mahmud. The bridge is made entirely of basalt blocks, some finely dressed others less so and has seven pointed arches, of which the southern two are the broadest. Deve Geçidi Bridge was last repaired in 1972.

The bridge became notorious as an execution site during the Armenian genocide; it is estimated at least 10,000 Armenians from Erzurum Vilayet were executed nearby.

== Sources ==
- Sinclair, T.A. (1989), Eastern Turkey: An Architectural and Archaeological Survey, vol. 3, Pindar Press, ISBN 0907132340
- "Bridges". Diyarbakır Büyükşehir Belediyesi.
