= Van vilayet =

First-level administrative division of the Ottoman Empire

ولايت وان Vilâyet-i Van
- Vilayet of the Ottoman Empire
- 1875–1922
- The Van Vilayet in 1900
- Capital: Van
- Population
  - Muslim, 1914: 179,982
  - Armenian, 1914: 67,792
  - Jewish, 1914: 1,383
- History
  - Established: 1875
  - Disestablished: 1922
Preceded by	Succeeded by
Van Eyalet	Turkey
- Today part of: Turkey

The Vilayet of Van (Ottoman Turkish: ولايت وان, romanized: Vilâyet-i Van; Armenian: Վանի վիլայեթ, romanized: Vani vilayet) was a first-level administrative division (vilayet) of the Ottoman Empire. At the beginning of the 20th century, it reportedly had a population of about 400,000 and an area of 15,000 square miles (39,000 km^{2}). Van Vilayet was one of the six Armenian vilayets and held, prior to the Armenian genocide during World War I, possessed a majority Armenian population, as well as Kurdish, Assyrian and Azeri minorities.

== History ==
In 1875, the eyalet of Erzurum was divided in six vilayets: Erzurum, Van, Hakkari, Bitlis, Hozat (Dersim) and Kars-Çildir. In 1888, by an imperial order Hakkari was joined to the vilayet of Van, and Hozat to Mamuret ul-Aziz.

As the border province of the north-eastern frontier, towards both the Russian Empire and Qajar Iran, it contained a number of garrisons. It was divided into the Sanjak of Van and the Sanjak of Hakkari and covered the present-day provinces of Van, Hakkari and parts of Şırnak, Muş and Bingöl ones.

During the Caucasus campaign of World War I, the Russians planned to invade the province after the breakdown of the Ottoman Army's offensive into Russia. The invasion threat led the Committee of Union and Progress to begin the Armenian genocide out of fear that Armenians in Van would support the Russian Caucasus Army.

== Demographics ==
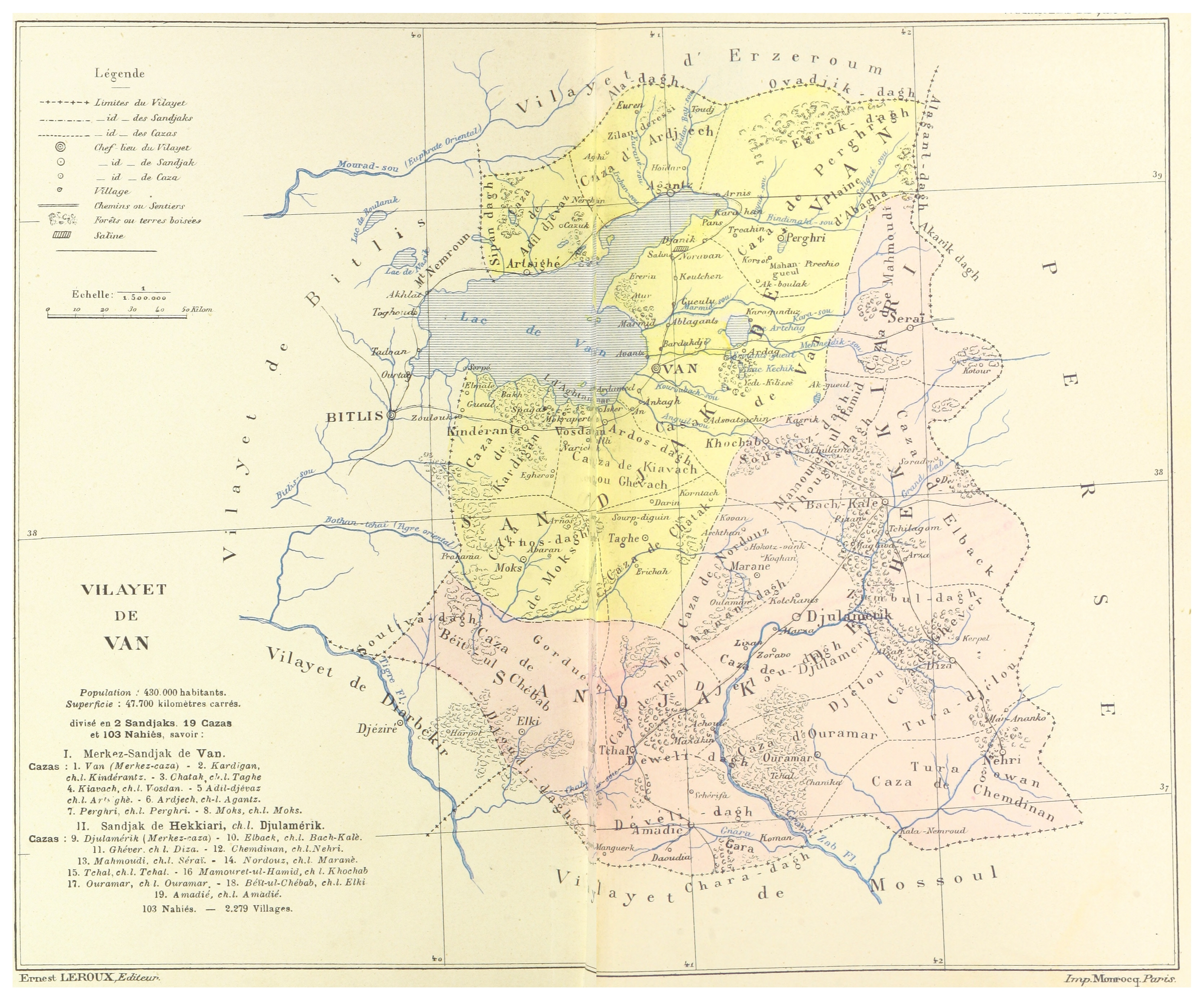
The Van Vilayet in 1892

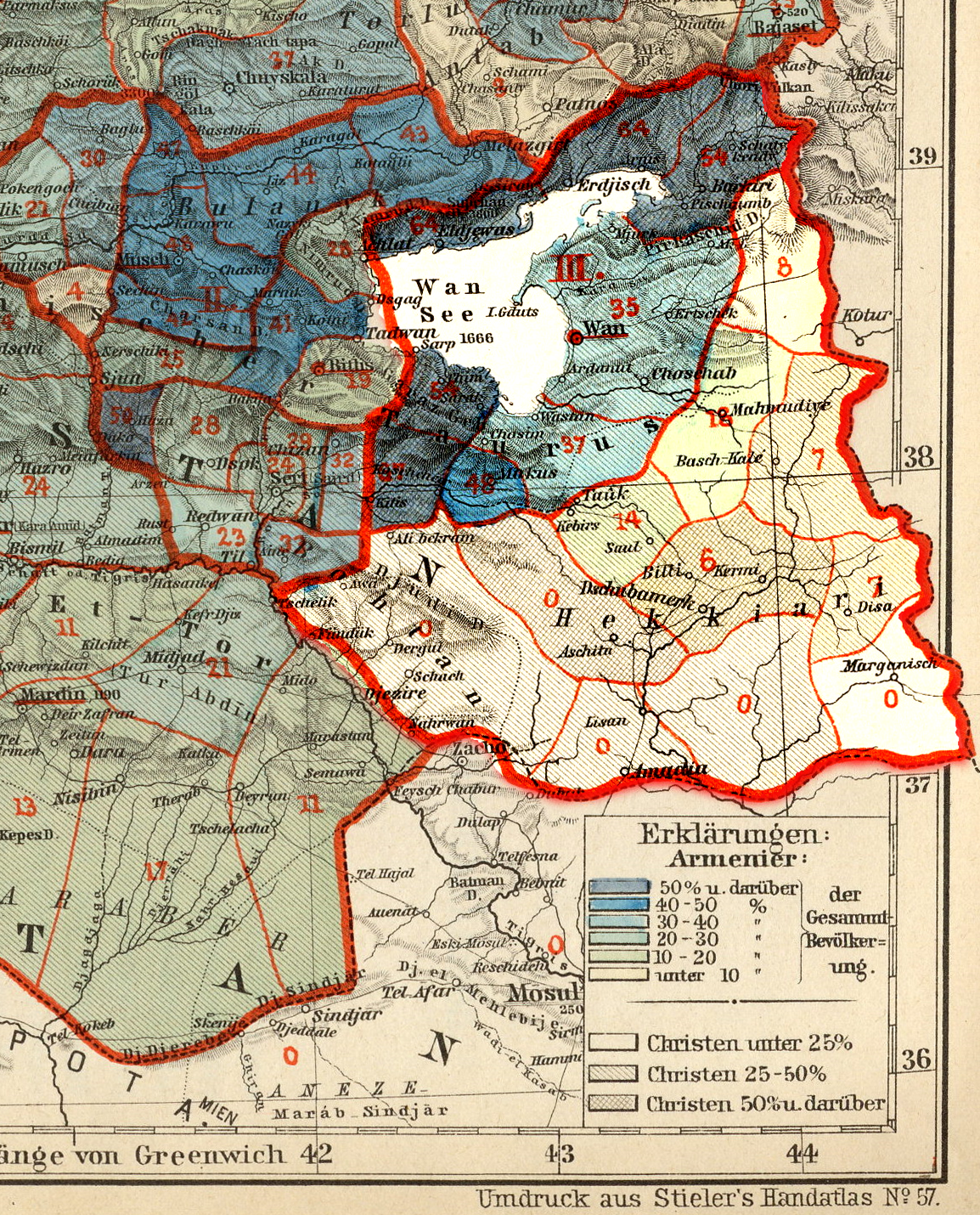
Armenian population of the Van province in 1896

At the beginning of the 20th century, Van Vilayet reportedly had an area of 15,440 square miles (40,000 km^{2}), while the preliminary results of the first Ottoman census of 1885 (published in 1908) gave the population as 376,297. The accuracy of the population figures ranges from "approximate" to "merely conjectural" depending on the region from which they were gathered.

Based on the official 1914 Ottoman Census, the population of Van province consisted of 179,422 Muslims and 67,797 Armenians. The Ottoman Census figures include only male citizens, excluding women and children. According to Armenian Patriarch of Constantinople, the corrected estimates for Van province (including women and children) was; 313,000 Muslims, 130,000 Armenians, and 65,000 others, including Assyrians.

== Geography ==
Vilayet of Van lay along the Persian frontier between the vilayets of Erzurum and Mosul. The northern sanjak comprised open plateau country N. and E. of the lake (with a large Armenian agricultural population and Kurdish seminomad tribes occupied chiefly in cattle and sheep raising), also of several fertile districts along the south shore of the lake. The southern sanjak was entirely mountainous, little developed and having the tribes only partly under government control. This comprised most of the upper basin of the Great Zab, with the country of the Hakkari Assyrians and many districts inhabited by Kurdish tribes, some of them large nomad tribes who descended for the winter to the plains of the Tigris.

The mineral wealth of the vilayet was never fully explored, but was believed to be great. There were petroleum springs at Kordzot, deposits of lignite at Sivan (now Avnik village in Bingöl) and Nurduz, several hot springs at Zilan Creek and Julamerk (Now Hakkari). Excellent tobacco was grown in Shemsdinan for export to Persia.

== Administrative divisions ==
Sanjaks of the Vilayet:

1. Sanjak of Van (Van, Erciş, Çatak, Adilcevaz, Gevaş)
2. Sanjak of Hakkari (Başkale, Hakkâri, Özalp, Şemdinli, Yüksekova, Gürpınar)

== Economy ==
Historically, the Van Vilayet produced millet. The economic center of the province was the city of Van. It was also a major wine producer. Both wine and brandy were made in small amounts. The vilayet also produced flax and hemp. Van also had a major sheep herding industry. As of 1906, there were over 3 million sheep in the vilayet. As of 1920, those numbers were reduced. Beekeeping was done by peasants, with honey being frozen and sold. The area also produced coal, lead, copper and borax, orpiment, gas, granite, lime, chalk, gypsum, gold, and salt.
