= Erzurum vilayet =

Administrative division of the Ottoman Empire in Asia (1867-1923)

ولايت ارضروم Vilâyet-i Erzurum
- Vilayet of the Ottoman Empire
- 1867–1923
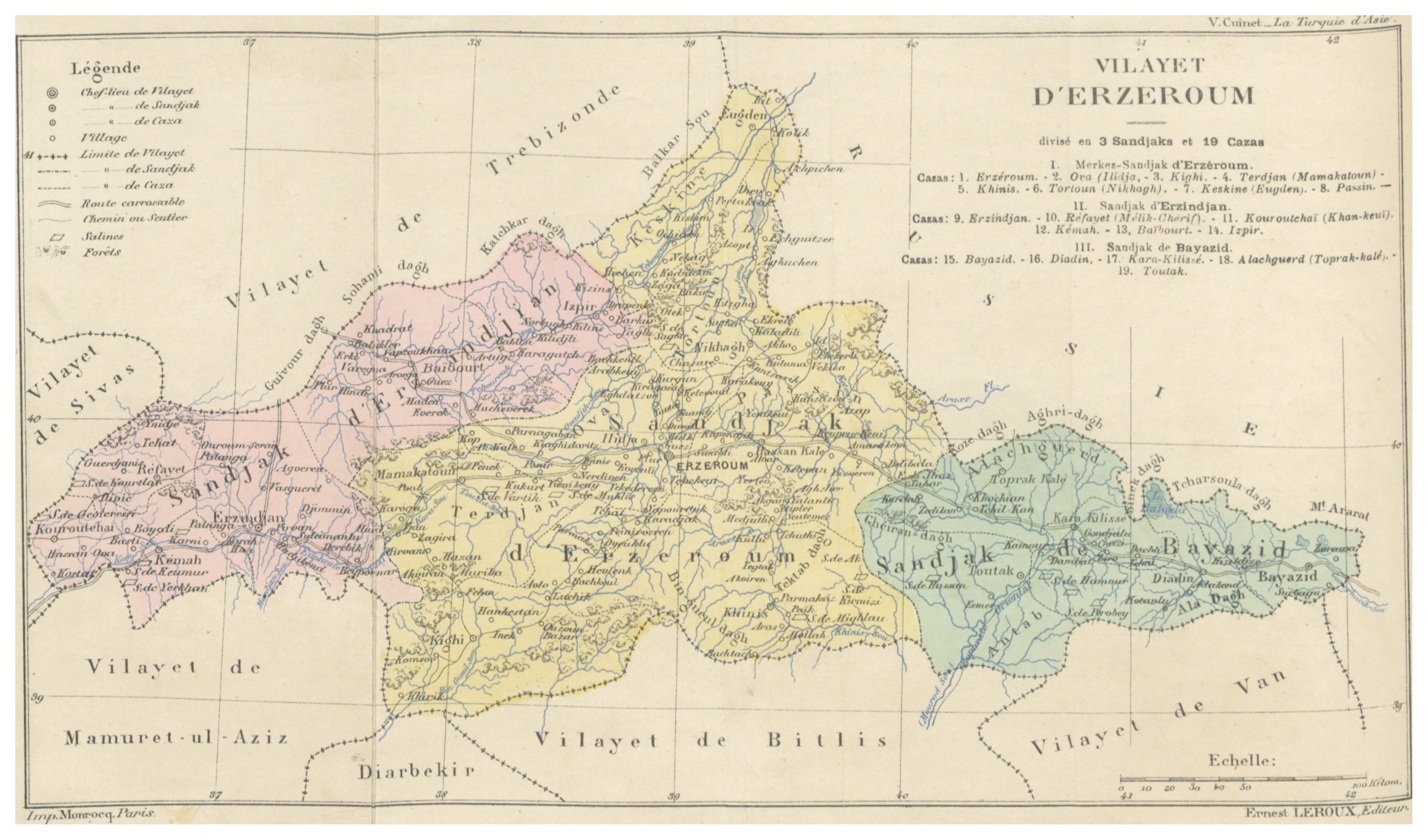
- The Erzurum Vilayet in 1890
- Capital: Erzurum
- History
  - Vilayet Law: 1867
  - Declaration of the Republic of Turkey: 1923
Preceded by	Succeeded by
Erzurum Eyalet	Bitlis Vilayet; Kars Oblast
- Today part of: Ağrı, Ardahan, Erzurum, Iğdır, Kars, Van

The Vilayet of Erzurum (Armenian: Էրզրումի նահանգ, Ottoman Turkish: ولايت ارضروم, Vilâyet-i Erzurum) was a first-level administrative division (vilayet) of the Ottoman Empire.

The vilayet of Erzurum shared borders with the Persian and Russian empires in the east and north-east, in the north with the Trebizond Vilayet, in the west with the vilayet of Sivas, and in the south with the vilayets of Bitlis, Mamuret-ül Aziz and Van.

At the beginning of the 20th century, Erzurum Vilayet reportedly had an area of 29,614 square miles (76,700 km^{2}), while the preliminary results of the first Ottoman census of 1885 (published in 1908) gave the population as 645,702. The accuracy of the population figures ranges from "approximate" to "merely conjectural" depending on the region from which they were gathered. It was one of the Six Vilayets in the eastern part of the Ottoman Empire, and, prior to World War I, many Armenians lived there. Also there lived small communities of Georgians, Pontic Greeks and Caucasus Greeks, and other ethnic groups, both Muslim and Christian (mainly Armenian Apostolic).

== History ==
The Erzurum Eyalet was one of the first Ottoman provinces to become a vilayet after an administrative reform in 1865, and by 1867 it had been reformed into the Erzurum Vilayet.

In 1875 it was divided in six vilayets: Erzurum, Van, Hakkari, Bitlis, Hozat (Dersim) and Kars-Çildir. In 1888 by an imperial order Hakkari was joined to the vilayet of Van, and Hozat to Mamuret ul-Aziz.

The Kars and Çildir regions were lost in the Russo-Turkish War (1877–1878) and ceded to the Russian Empire, which administered it as the Kars Oblast until 1917.

== Administrative divisions ==
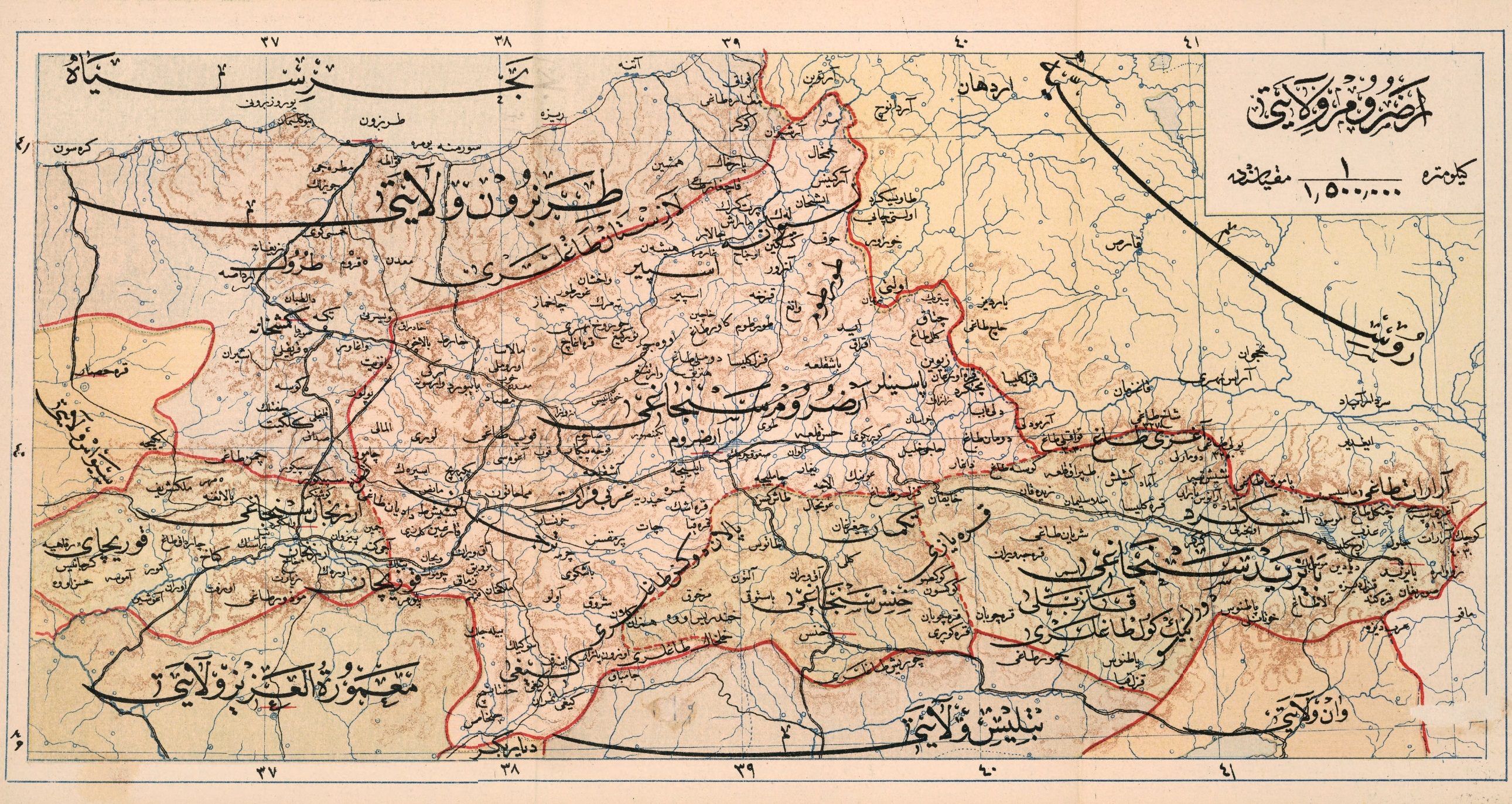
Map of subdivisions of Erzurum Vilayet in 1907

Sanjaks of the vilayet:

1. Sanjak of Erzurum (Erzurum, Pasinler, Bayburt, İspir, Tercan, Tortum, Yusufeli, Kiğı, Narman, Hınıs)
2. Sanjak of Erzincan (Erzincan, Pülümür, Refahiye, İliç, Kemah)
3. Sanjak of Bayazid (Beyazit, Eleşkirt, Diyadin, Tutak, Ağrı)

== Demographics ==
In 1893, there were in total 19 Kaza (districts). In all kaza's Muslims (Sunni and Alevi) were the majority. Lowest percentage of Muslims (64%) was in the kaza of Hınıs. Most of the Protestants and Catholics were Armenian.

Population of the Sanjaks, in thousands, according to the Ottoman census of 1893
Groups	Erzurum	Bayezid	Erzincan	Total
Muslims	312,2	47,4	85,9	445,5
Armenian Apostolic	73,9	8,3	19	101,2
Catholics	5,4	1,3	-	6,7
Protestants	1,7	0,1	0,2	2
Greek Orthodox	1,5	-	2	3,5
Others	0,2	-	-	0,2
Total	394,9	57,1	107,1	559

== See also ==
- Western Armenia
