= Sivas vilayet =

First-level administrative division of the Ottoman Empire

ولايت سيوس Vilâyet-i Sivas
- Vilayet of the Ottoman Empire
- 1867–1922
- The Sivas Vilayet in 1900
- Capital: Sivas
- History
  - Vilayet Law: 1867
  - Disestablished: 1922
Preceded by	Succeeded by
Rûm Eyalet	Sivas Province

The Vilayet of Sivas (Armenian: Սեբաստիայի նահանգ, Ottoman Turkish: ولايت سيوس, romanized: Vilâyet-i Sivas) was a first-level administrative division (vilayet) of the Ottoman Empire, and was one of the Six Armenian vilayets. The vilayet was bordered by Erzurum Vilayet to the east, Mamuretülaziz Vilayet to the south-east, the Trebizond Vilayet to the north and Ankara Vilayet to the west.

At the beginning of the 20th century, it had an area of 32,308 square miles (83,680 km^{2}), while the preliminary results of the first Ottoman census of 1885 (published in 1908) gave the population as 996,126. The accuracy of the population figures ranges from "approximate" to "merely conjectural" depending on the region from which they were gathered.

== History ==
The Vilayet of Sivas was created in 1867 when eyalets were replaced with vilayets under the "Vilayet Law" (Turkish: Teşkil-i Vilayet Nizamnamesi) and was dissolved in 1922 by Atatürk's reorganization.

From 1913 to 1916, Ahmed Muammer was the Vali (governor) of the vilayet, and he has been accused of being complicit in actions against the Armenian population.

== Administrative divisions ==
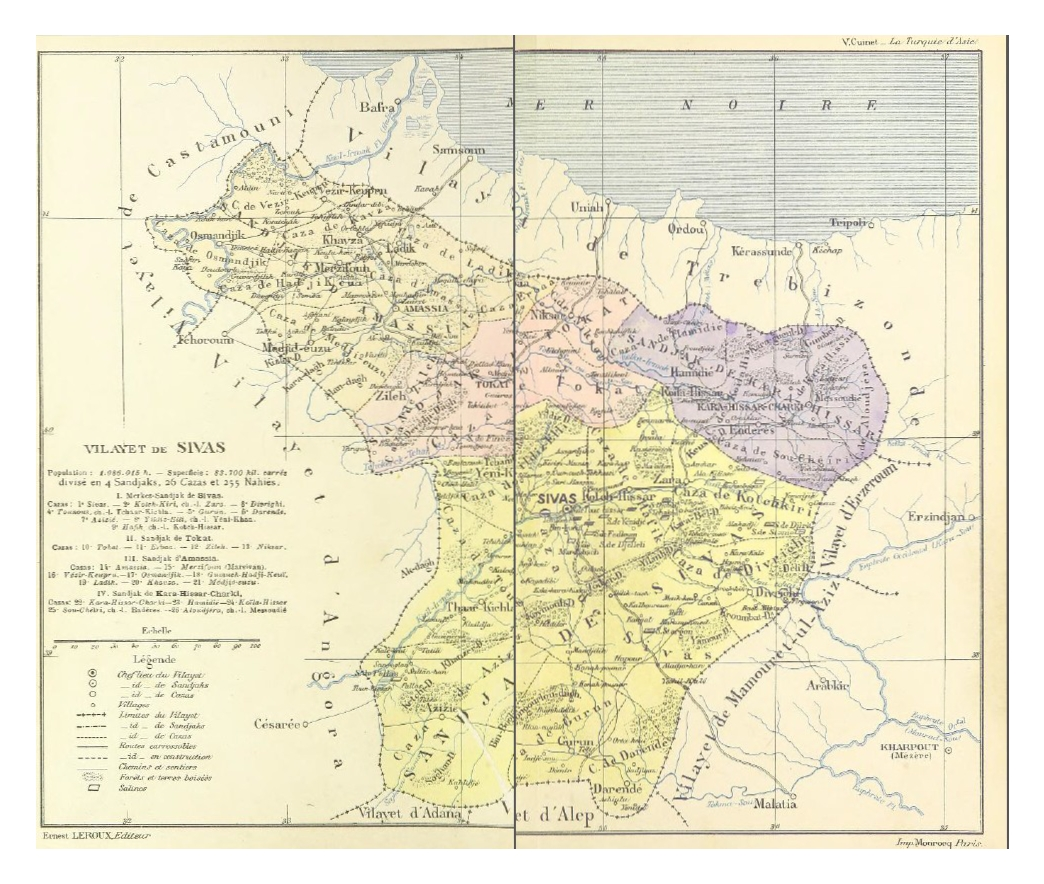
Sanjaks of the Vilayet in 1890

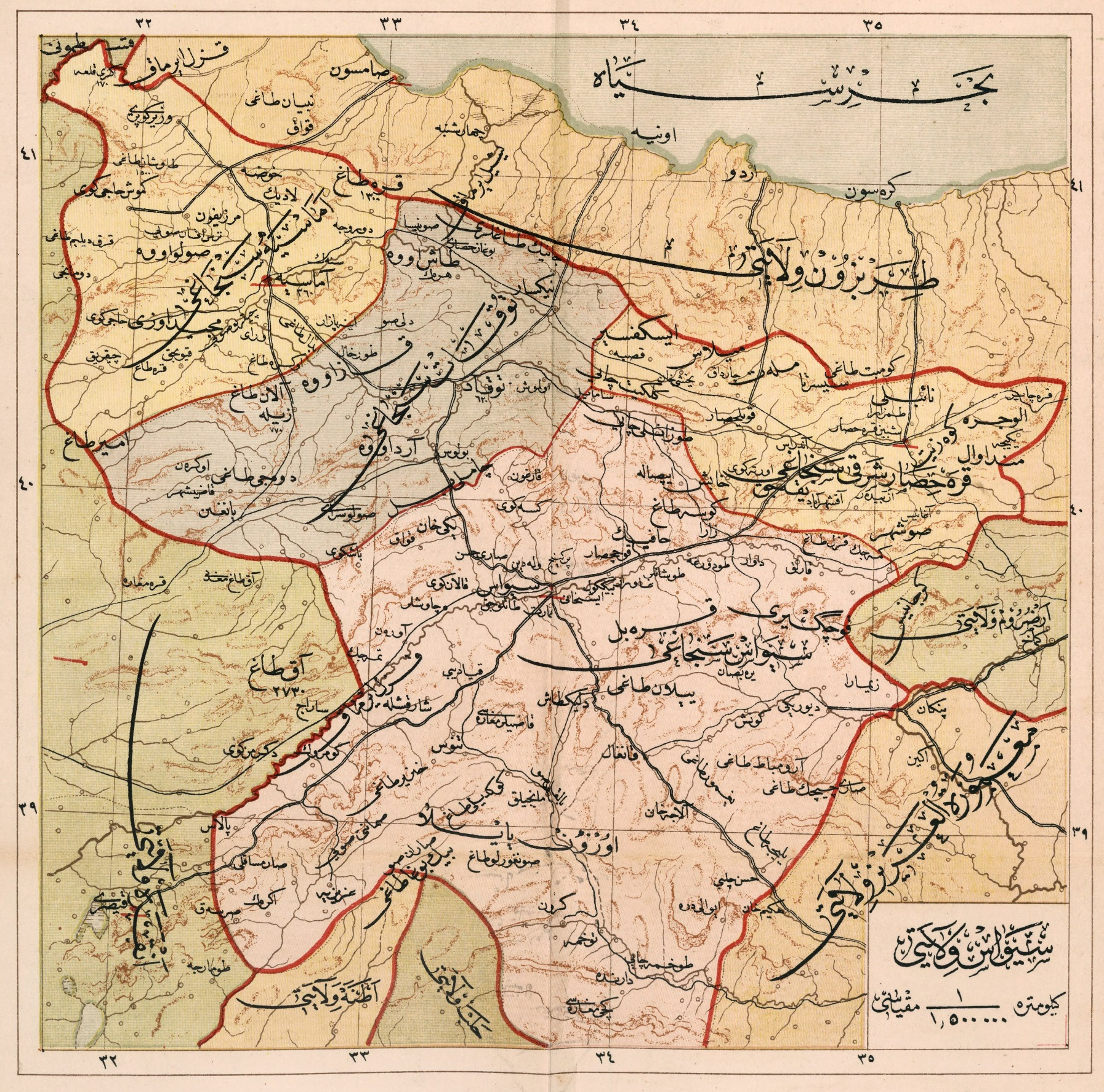
Map of subdivisions of Sivas Vilayet in 1907

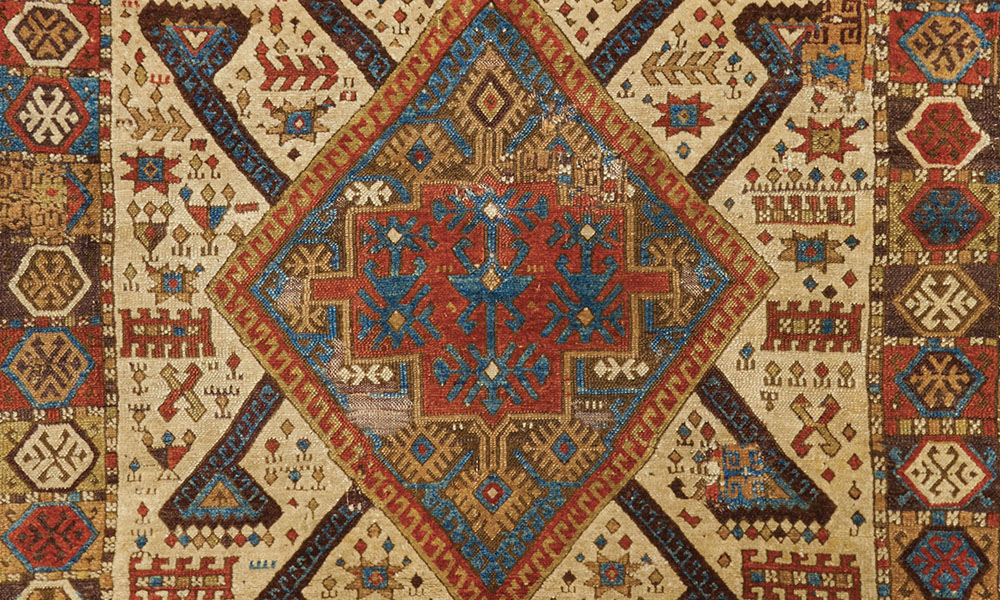
East Anatolian rug (detail), from the Şarkişla-Sivas region. Made ca. 1800

Sanjaks of the Vilayet:

1. Sanjak of Sivas (Sivas, Bünyan, Şarkışla, Hafik, Darende, Divriği, Aziziye, Kangal, Zara, Gürün, Yıldızeli)
2. Sanjak of Amasya (Amasya, Havza, Mecitözü, Vezirköprü, Gümüşhacıköy, Merzifon, Ladik)
3. Sanjak of Karahisar-ı Şarki (Şebinkarahisar, Alucra, Hamidiye, Suşehri (Endires till 1875), Koyulhisar)
4. Sanjak of Tokad (Created from Sivas sanjak in 1880 and gained Erbaa and Zile kazas from Amasya one) (Tokat, Erbaa, Zile, Niksar (Before 1880 it was part of Canik Sanjak of Trabzon Vilayet), Reşadiye)

Not: Reşadiye (İskefsir till 1909) was nahiya center in Hamidiye kaza of Sanjak of Karahisar-ı Şarki till 1906.
