= Constantinople vilayet =

First-level administrative division of the Ottoman Empire

İstanbul
- Vilayet of the Ottoman Empire
- 1878–1922
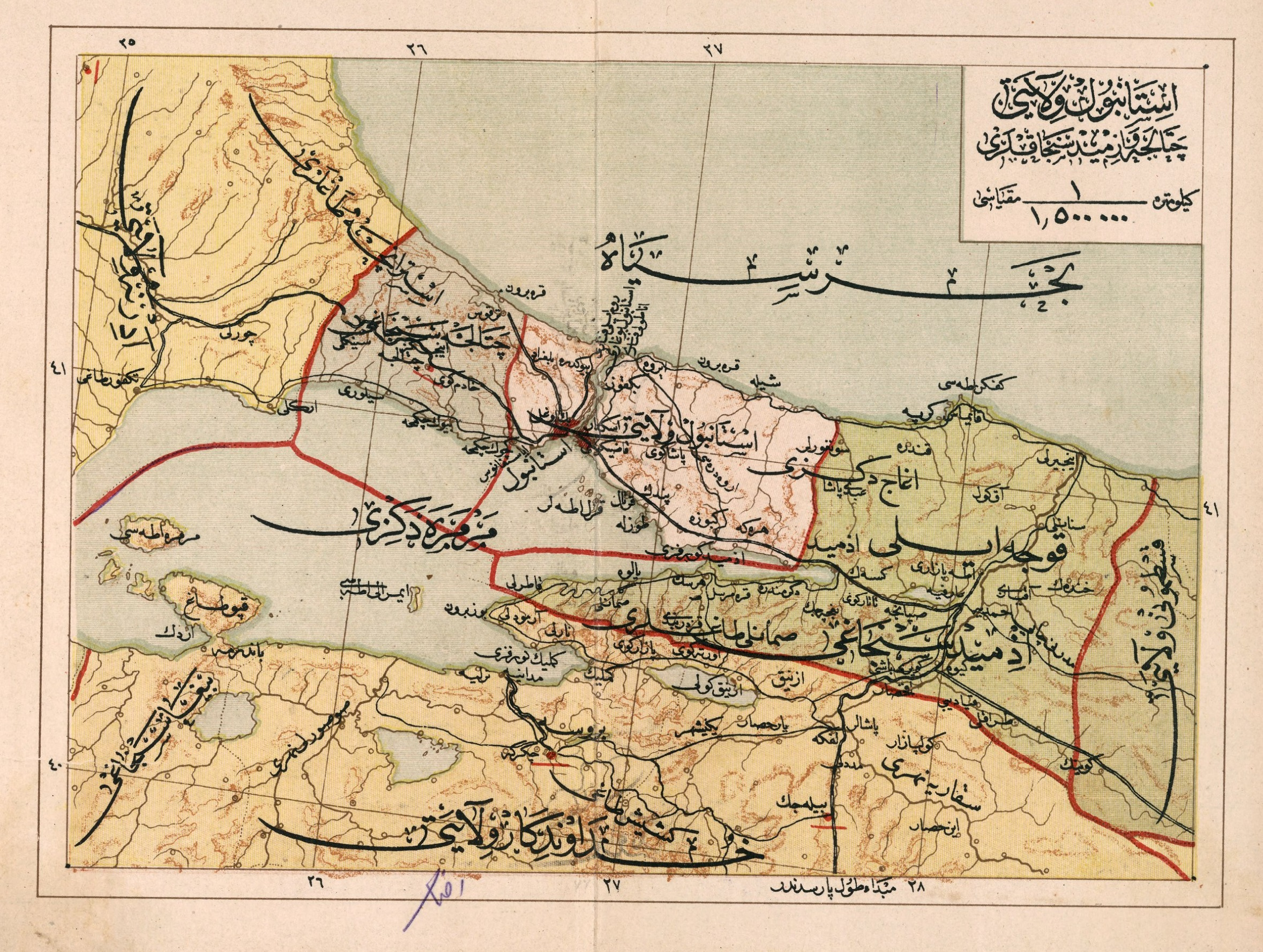
- Capital: Constantinople (now Istanbul)
- Population
  - Muslim, 1914: 560,434
  - Greek, 1914: 205,752
  - Armenian, 1914: 82,880
  - Jewish, 1914: 52,126
- History
  - Established: 1878
  - Disestablished: 1922
| Preceded by | Succeeded by |
| İstanbul Eyaleti | Istanbul Province |
- Today part of: Turkey

The Vilayet of Constantinople or Istanbul (Turkish: Vilâyet-i İstanbul, ولایت استانبول) was a first-level administrative division (vilayet) of the Ottoman Empire, encompassing the imperial capital, Constantinople (Istanbul).

== History ==
It had a special organisation, as it was placed under the immediate authority of the Minister of Police (Zabtiye Naziri), who filled a role equivalent to the governor (wali) in other vilayets.

It included Stamboul (the inner city, known in Turkish as Istanbul) and the quarters of Eyüp, Kassim Pacha, Pera and Galata, and all the suburbs from Silivri on the Sea of Marmara to the Black Sea on the European side, and from Ghili on the Black Sea to the end of the Gulf of İzmit on the Asiatic side.

In 1878, a provincial structure, with a governor (wāli) and provincial officers, was established to perform the same functions within Constantinople that provincial authorities performed elsewhere in the Empire.

== Administrative divisions ==
Sanjaks and kazas, circa 1877:

- Sanjak of Stamboul: kazas of Fatih-Sultan-Mehmet, Eyüp, Kartal, Prince Islands
- Sanjak of Pera: kazas of Galata, Yeniköy.
- Sanjak of Scutari: kaza of Beykoz.
- Sanjak of Büyükçekmece, kaza of Çatalca.

== Demography ==
Ethnic Groups in Constantinople Vilayet
1. Islam (62.0%)
2. Orthodox (23.0%)
3. Apostolic (9.00%)
4. Judaism (6.00%)

Istanbul vilayet 1914 population
| Township | Muslim | % | Greek Orthodox | % | Armenian | % | Jewish | % | Others | % | Total |
| Fatih (Downtown) | 279,056 | 72.1% | 64,287 | 16.6% | 28,095 | 7.3% | 13,441 | 3.5% | 2,013 | 0.5% | 386,892 |
| Bakırköy | 28,967 | 61.8% | 11,221 | 23.9% | 5,954 | 12.7% | 364 | 0.8% | 390 | 0.8% | 46,896 |
| Adalar | 1,586 | 14.3% | 8,725 | 78.7% | 652 | 5.9% | 79 | 0.7% | 45 | 0.4% | 11,087 |
| Beyoğlu | 117,267 | 44.9% | 75,971 | 29.1% | 30,642 | 11.7% | 31,080 | 11.9% | 6,135 | 2.4% | 261,095 |
| Üsküdar | 70,447 | 63.1% | 19,832 | 17.8% | 13,949 | 12.5% | 6,836 | 6.1% | 579 | 0.5% | 111,643 |
| Gebze | 26,220 | 81.6% | 5,856 | 18.2% | 47 | 0.2% | 0 | 0.0% | 21 | 0.1% | 32,144 |
| Kartal | 8,257 | 45.0% | 6,862 | 37.4% | 3,216 | 17.5% | 13 | 0.1% | 0 | 0.0% | 18,348 |
| Beykoz | 14,466 | 77.0% | 3,708 | 19.7% | 325 | 1.7% | 292 | 1.6% | 1 | 0.0% | 18,792 |
| Şile | 14,168 | 61.4% | 8,913 | 38.6% | 0 | 0.0% | 0 | 0.0% | 0 | 0.0% | 23,081 |
| Total | 560,434 | 61.6% | 205,375 | 22.6% | 82,880 | 9.1% | 52,126 | 5.7% | 9,163 | 1.0% | 909,978 |
Armenians: 72,962 Gregorian and 9,918 Catholic. The province has a total population of 1,213 Protestants and 387 Greek Catholics.

== See also ==
- History of Istanbul
