= Vilayet =

First-order administrative division of the later Ottoman Empire

Law of the vilayets (French: loi des vilayets; 1867), in Volume II of Legislation ottomane, published by Gregory Aristarchis and edited by Demetrius Nicolaides

A vilayet (Ottoman Turkish: ولایت, 'province'; [vi.laː.jet]), also known by various other names, was a first-order administrative division of the later Ottoman Empire. It was introduced in the Vilayet Law of 21 January 1867, part of the Tanzimat reform movement initiated by the Ottoman Reform Edict of 1856. The Danube Vilayet had been specially formed in 1864 as an experiment under the leading reformer Midhat Pasha. The Vilayet Law expanded its use, but it was not until 1884 that it was applied to all of the empire's provinces. Writing for the Encyclopaedia Britannica in 1911, Vincent Henry Penalver Caillard claimed that the reform had intended to provide the provinces with greater amounts of local self-government but in fact centralized more power with the sultan and local Muslims at the expense of other communities.

== Names ==
The Ottoman Turkish vilayet (ولایت) was a loanword borrowed from Arabic wilāya (وِلَايَة), an abstract noun formed from the verb waliya (وَلِيَ, 'to administer'). In Arabic, it had meant 'province', 'region', or 'administration' as general ideas, but following the Tanzimat reforms the Ottoman term formalized it in reference to specific areas in a defined hierarchy. It was borrowed into Albanian vilajet, Bulgarian vilaet (вилает), Judaeo-Spanish vilayet, and French vilaïet and vilayet, which was used as a lingua franca among the educated Jews and Christians. It was also translated into Armenian as gawaŕ (գաւառ), Bulgarian as oblast (област), Judaeo-Spanish as provinsiya, and Greek as eparchía (επαρχία) and nomarchía (νομαρχία).

The early Republic of Turkey continued to use the term vilayet until it renamed them il in the late 1920s.

== Organization ==
The Ottoman Empire had already begun to modernize its administration and regularize its eyalets in the 1840s, but the Vilayet Law extended this throughout the empire, regulating the hierarchy of administrative units.

Each vilayet or province was governed by a vali appointed by the sultan. Acting as the sultan's representative, he was notionally the supreme head of administration in his province, subject to various caveats. Military administration was entirely separate, although the vali controlled local police. His council comprised a secretary (mektupçu), a comptroller (defterdar), a chief justice (müfettiş-i hükkâm-ı şeriyye), and directors of foreign affairs, public works, and agriculture and commerce, each nominated by the respective ministers in Istanbul. The defterdar in particular answered directly to the finance minister rather than the vali. A separate vilayet council was composed of four elected members, comprising two Muslims and two non-Muslims.

If the vali fell ill or was absent from the capital, he was variously replaced by the governor of the chief sanjak (merkez sancak) near the capital, the muavin, and the defterdar. A similar structure was replicated in the lower hierarchical levels, with executive and advisory councils drawn from the local administrators and—following long-established practice—the heads of the millets, the various local religious communities.

The Vilayet Law (1864) saw a general reorganization, with the hierarchy vilayet—sanjak—kaza—nahiye, the vilayet administrated by the Vali under whose authority was the mutasarrif of the sanjak appointed by the Sultan, the kaymakam of the kaza appointed by the Interior Ministry, the mudür of the nahiye, the muhtar of the village.

== Lists ==
=== 1870s ===
Vilayets, sanjaks and autonomies in the mid-1870s:

- Constantinople Vilayet
- Adrianople Vilayet: sanjaks of Adrianople (Edirne), Tekirdağ, Gelibolu, Filibe, Sliven.
- Danube Vilayet: sanjaks of Ruse, Varna, Vidin, Tulcea, Turnovo, Sofia, Niš.
- Bosnia Vilayet: sanjaks of Bosna-Serai, Zvornik, Banja Luka, Travnik, Bebkèh, Novi Pazar.
- Vilayet of Herzegovina: sanjaks of Mostar, Gacko.
- Salonica Vilayet: sanjaks of Salonica, Serres, Drama.
- Janina Vilayet: sanjaks of Ioannina, Tirhala, Ohrid, Preveze, Berat.
- Monastir Vilayet: sanjaks of Manastir (now Bitola), Prizren, Üsküb, Dibra.
- Scutari Vilayet: sanjak of Scutari.
- Vilayet of the Archipelago: sanjaks of Rhodes, Midilli, Sakız, Kos, Cyprus.
- Vilayet of Crete: sanjaks of Chania, Rethymno, Candia, Sfakia, Lasithi.
- Vilayet of Hudavendigar: sanjaks of Bursa, Izmid, Karasi, Karahisar-i-Sarip, Kütahya.
- Vilayet of Aidin: sanjaks of Smyrna (now İzmir), Aydın, Saruhan, Menteşe.
- Vilayet of Angora: sanjaks of Angora (now Ankara), Yozgat, Kayseri, Kırşehir.
- Vilayet of Konya: sanjaks of Konya, Teke, Hamid, Niğde, Burdur.
- Vilayet of Kastamonu: sanjaks of Kastamonu, Boli, Sinop, Çankırı.
- Kosovo Vilayet
- Vilayet of Trebizond: sanjaks of Trebizond (Trabzon), Gümüşhane, Batumi, Canik.
- Vilayet of Sivas: sanjaks of Sivas, Amasya, Karahisar-ı Şarki.
- Vilayet of Erzurum: sanjaks of Erzurum, Tchaldir, Bayezit, Kars, Mouch, Erzincan, Van.
- Vilayet of Diyarbekir: sanjaks of Diyarbakır, Mamuret-ul-Aziz, Mardin, Siirt, Malatya.
- Vilayet of Adana: sanjaks of Adana, Kozan, İçel, Paias.
- Vilayet of Syria: sanjaks of Damascus, Hama, Beirut, Tripoli, Hauran, Akka, Belka, Kudus-i-Cherif (Jerusalem).
- Vilayet of Aleppo: sanjaks of Aleppo, Maraş, Urfa, Zor.
- Vilayet of Baghdad: sanjaks of Baghdad, Mosul, Sharazor, Sulaymaniyah, Dialim, Kerbela, Helleh, Amara.
- Vilayet of Basra: sanjaks of Basra, Muntafiq, Najd, Hejaz.
- Emirate of Mecca: Mecca, Medina.
- Vilayet of Yemen: sanjaks of Sana'a, Hudaydah, Asir, Ta'izz.
- Vilayet of Tripolitania: sanjaks of Tripoli, Bengazi, Khoms, Djebal gharbiyeh, Fezzan.
- Mount Lebanon Mutasarrifate
- Principality of Samos
- Mount Athos (part of the Sanjak of Salonica)

=== 1905 ===
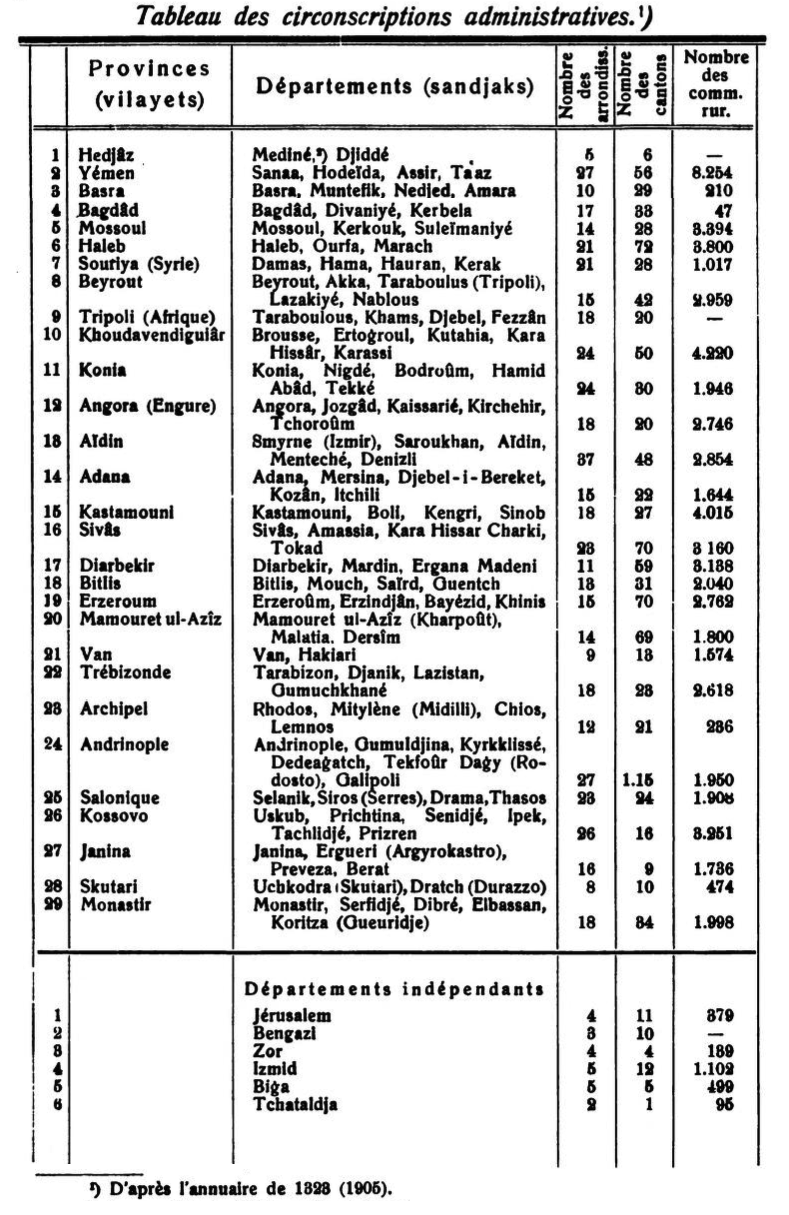
Table of Ottoman Administrative Divisions, 1905

By 1905, the Ottoman Empire had lost administrative control over Bosnia & Herzegovina, Bulgaria and Eastern Rumelia, Crete and Cyprus, even though these were all still under nominal Ottoman sovereignty, as was Egypt. In this list, the numbering and place names are indicated as in the French-language source, with present-day names in parentheses where different:

1. Hedjâz (Hejaz): Sanjaks of Mediné (Medina) and Djiddé (Jeddah)
2. Yemen: Sanjaks of Sanaa, Hodeïda (Hodeidah), Assir (Asir), and Ta'az (Taiz)
3. Basra: Sanjaks of Basra, Muntefik (Al-Muntafiq), Nedjed (Najd), and Amara (Amarah)
4. Bagdâd: Sanjaks of Bagdâd (Baghdad), Divaniyé (Al Diwaniyah), and Kerbela (Karbala)
5. Mossoul: Sanjaks of Mossoul (Mosul), Kerkouk (Kirkuk), and Souleïmaniyé (Sulaymaniyah)
6. Haleb: Sanjaks of Haleb (Aleppo), Ourfa (Urfa), and Marach (Kahramanmaraş)
7. Syria: Sanjaks of Damas (Damascus), Hama, Hauran, and Kerak (Al-Karak)
8. Beirout: Sanjaks of Beirout (Beirut), Akka (Acre), Taraboulus (Tripoli in Lebanon), Lazakiyé (Latakia), and Nablous (Nablus)
9. Tripoli: Sanjaks of Taraboulous (Tripoli in Libya), Khams (Al-Khums), Djebel (Jabal al Gharbi), and Fezzân
10. Khoudavendiguiâr: Sanjaks of Brousse (Bursa), Ertoġroul (Bilecik), Kutahia (Kütahya), Kara Hissâr (Afyonkarahisar), and Karassi (Balıkesir)
11. Konia: Sanjaks of Konia (Konya), Nigdé (Niğde), Bodroûm (Bodrum), Hamid Abâd (Isparta), and Tekké (Antalya)
12. Angora: Sanjaks of Angora (Ankara), Jozgâd (Yozgat), Kaissarié (Kayseri), Kirchehir (Kırşehir), and Tchoroûm (Çorum)
13. Aïdin: Sanjaks of Smyrne (İzmir), Saroukhan (Manisa), Aïdin (Aydın), Menteché (Muğla), and Denizli
14. Adana: Sanjaks of Adana, Mersina (Mersin), Djebel-i-Bereket (Yarpuz), Kozân, and Itchili (Silifke)
15. Kastamouni: Sanjaks of Kastamouni (Kastamonu), Boli (Bolu), Kengri (Çankırı), and Sinob (Sinop)
16. Sivâs: Sanjaks of Sivâs, Amassia (Amasya), Kara Hissar Charki (Şebinkarahisar), and Tokad (Tokat)
17. Diarbekir: Sanjaks of Diarbekir (Diyarbakır), Mardin, and Ergana Madeni (Maden)
18. Bitlis: Sanjaks of Bitlis, Mouch (Muş), Saïrd (Siirt), and Guentch (Genç)
19. Erzeroum: Sanjaks of Erzeroûm (Erzurum), Erzindjân (Erzincan), Bayézid (Doğubayazıt), and Khinis (Hınıs)
20. Mamouret ul-Azîz: Sanjaks of Mamouret ul-Azîz / Kharpoût (Elazığ), Malatia (Malatya), and Dersîm (Tunceli)
21. Van: Sanjaks of Van and Hakiari (Hakkâri)
22. Trébizonde: Sanjaks of Tarabizon (Trabzon), Djanik (Samsun), Lazistan (Rize), Gumuchkhané (Gümüşhane)
23. Archipel (Aegean Sea): Sanjaks of Rhodos (Rhodes), Midilli (Mytilene), Chios, and Lemnos
24. Andrinople: Sanjaks of Andrinople (Edirne), Gumuldjina (Komotini), Kirkkilissé (Kırklareli), Dedeaġatch (Alexandroupolis), Tekfoûr Daġy / Rodosto (Tekirdağ), and Galipoli (Gelibolu)
25. Salonique: Sanjaks of Selanik (Thessaloniki), Siros (Serres), Drama, and Thasos
26. Kossovo: Sanjaks of Uskub (Skopje), Prichtina (Pristina), Senidjé (Sjenica), Ipek (Peja), Tachildjé (Pljevlja), and Prizren
27. Janina: Sanjaks of Janina (Ioannina), Ergueri / Argyrokastro (Gjirokastër), Preveza, and Berat
28. Skutari: Sanjaks of Skutari (Shkodër) and Dratch / Durazzo (Durrës)
29. Monastir: Sanjaks of Monastir (Bitola), Serfidjé (Servia), Dibré (Debar), Elbassan (Elbasan), and Koritza (Korçë)

The same document added Jerusalem, Bengazi, Zor, Izmid, Biġa, and Tchataldja as independent departments, but did not mention the Mount Lebanon Mutasarrifate and Principality of Samos, both self-administered under a leader appointed by the Ottoman government. The Sharifate of Mecca was another special case, coexisting with the Hejaz vilayet without being subordinate to it.

=== 1917 ===
Vilayets and independent sanjaks in 1917:

Vilayets included:

- Vilayet of Constantinople
- Vilayet of Adrianople
- Vilayet of Adana
- Vilayet of Angora
- Vilayet of Aidin
- Vilayet of Baghdad
- Vilayet of Basra
- Vilayet of Beirut
- Vilayet of Bitlis
- Vilayet of Aleppo
- Vilayet of Bursa
- Vilayet of Diarbekr
- Vilayet of Erzurum
- Vilayet of Syria
- Vilayet of Sivas
- Vilayet of Trebizond
- Vilayet of Kastamuni
- Vilayet of Konia
- Vilayet of Mamuret ul-Aziz
- Vilayet of Mosul
- Vilayet of Van

Independent sanjaks included:

- Sanjak of Eskishehir
- Sanjak of Urfa
- Sanjak of Izmid
- Sanjak of Ichili
- Sanjak of Boli
- Sanjak of Teke
- Sanjak of Janyk
- Sanjak of Chatalja
- Sanjak of Zor
- Sanjak of Kara Hissar Sahib
- Sanjak of Karasi
- Sanjak of Dardanelles
- Sanjak of Kaisari
- Sanjak of Kutahia
- Sanjak of Marash
- Sanjak of Menteshe
- Sanjak of Nigde

Vassal states and autonomous provinces:

- Eastern Rumelia (Rumeli-i Şarkî): autonomous province (Vilayet in Turkish) (1878–1885); unified with Bulgaria in 1885
- Sanjak of Benghazi (Bingazi Sancağı): autonomous sanjak. Formerly in the vilayet of Tripoli, but after 1875 dependent directly on the ministry of the interior at Constantinople.
- Sanjak of Biga (Biga Sancağı) (also called Kale-i Sultaniye) (autonomous sanjak, not a vilayet)
- Sanjak of Çatalca (Çatalca Sancağı) (autonomous sanjak, not a vilayet)
- Cyprus (Kıbrıs) (island with special status) (Kıbrıs Adası)
- Khedivate of Egypt (Mısır) (autonomous khedivate, not a vilayet) (Mısır Hidivliği)
- Sanjak of Izmit (İzmid Sancağı) (autonomous sanjak, not a vilayet)
- Mutasarrifyya/Sanjak of Jerusalem (Kudüs-i Şerif Mutasarrıflığı): independent and directly linked to the Minister of the Interior in view of its importance to the three major monotheistic religions.
- Sharifate of Mecca (Mekke Şerifliği) (autonomous sharifate, not a vilayet)
- Mount Lebanon Mutasarrifate (Cebel-i Lübnan Mutasarrıflığı): sanjak or mutessariflik, dependent directly on the Porte.
- Principality of Samos (Sisam Beyliği) (island with special status)
- Tunis Eyalet (Tunus Eyaleti) (autonomous eyalet, ruled by hereditary beys)

=== 1927 ===
The early Turkish Republic had 63 vilayet in the 1927 Turkish census:

1. Ankara vilayet
2. Istanbul vilayet
3. Artvin vilayet
4. Edirne vilayet
5. Ertuğrul (Bilecik) vilayet
6. Erzurum vilayet
7. Ordu vilayet
8. Erzincan vilayet
9. Izmir vilayet
10. Eskişehir vilayet
11. Adana vilayet
12. Afyonkarahisar vilayet
13. Aksaray vilayet
14. Elaziz vilayet
15. Amasya vilayet
16. Antalya vilayet
17. Urfa vilayet
18. Aydın vilayet
19. Içel vilayet
20. Bayezid vilayet
21. Bitlis vilayet
22. Bursa vilayet
23. Bozok vilayet
24. Bolu vilayet
25. Burdur vilayet
26. Tekirdağ vilayet
27. Tokat vilayet
28. Canik vilayet
29. Cebel-i Bereket vilayet
30. Çankırı vilayet
31. Çanakkale vilayet
32. Çorum vilayet
33. Hakkâri vilayet
34. Hamîdâbâd vilayet
35. Denizli vilayet
36. Diyarbekir vilayet
37. Rize vilayet
38. Zonguldak vilayet
39. Siirt vilayet
40. Sinop vilayet
41. Sivas vilayet
42. Saruhan vilayet
43. Trabzon vilayet
44. Gazi Ayıntab (Gaziantep) vilayet
45. Kars vilayet
46. Kırklareli vilayet
47. Karahisâr-ı Şarkî (Şebinkarahisar) vilayet
48. Karesi (Balıkesir) vilayet
49. Kastamonu vilayet
50. Kırşehir vilayet
51. Kayseri vilayet
52. Kocaeli vilayet
53. Konya vilayet
54. Kütahya vilayet
55. Gümüşhane vilayet
56. Giresun vilayet
57. Mardin vilayet
58. Mersin vilayet
59. Maraş vilayet
60. Menteşe (Muğla) vilayet
61. Malatya vilayet
62. Niğde vilayet
63. Van vilayet

== Maps ==
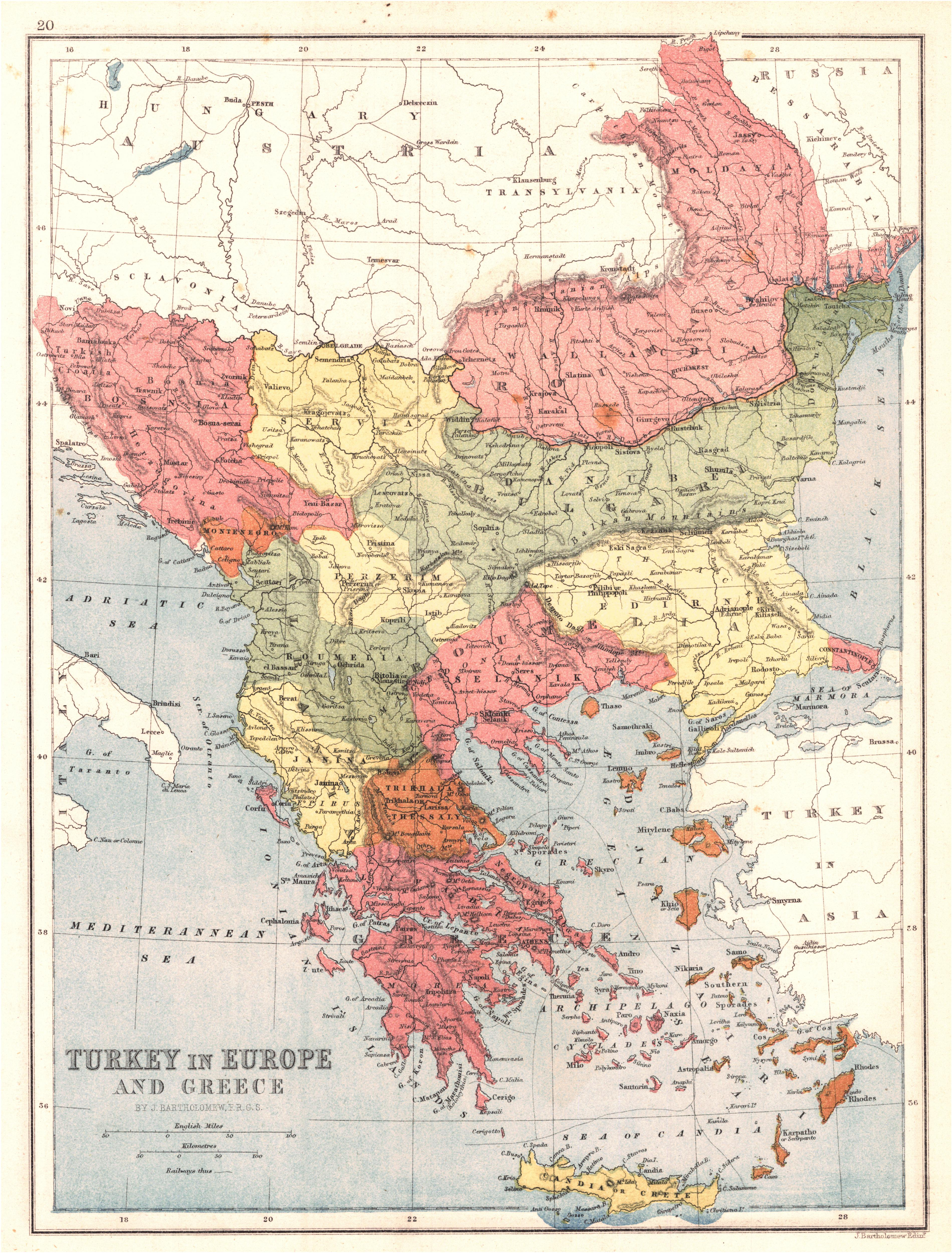
Vilayets of Europe in 1870

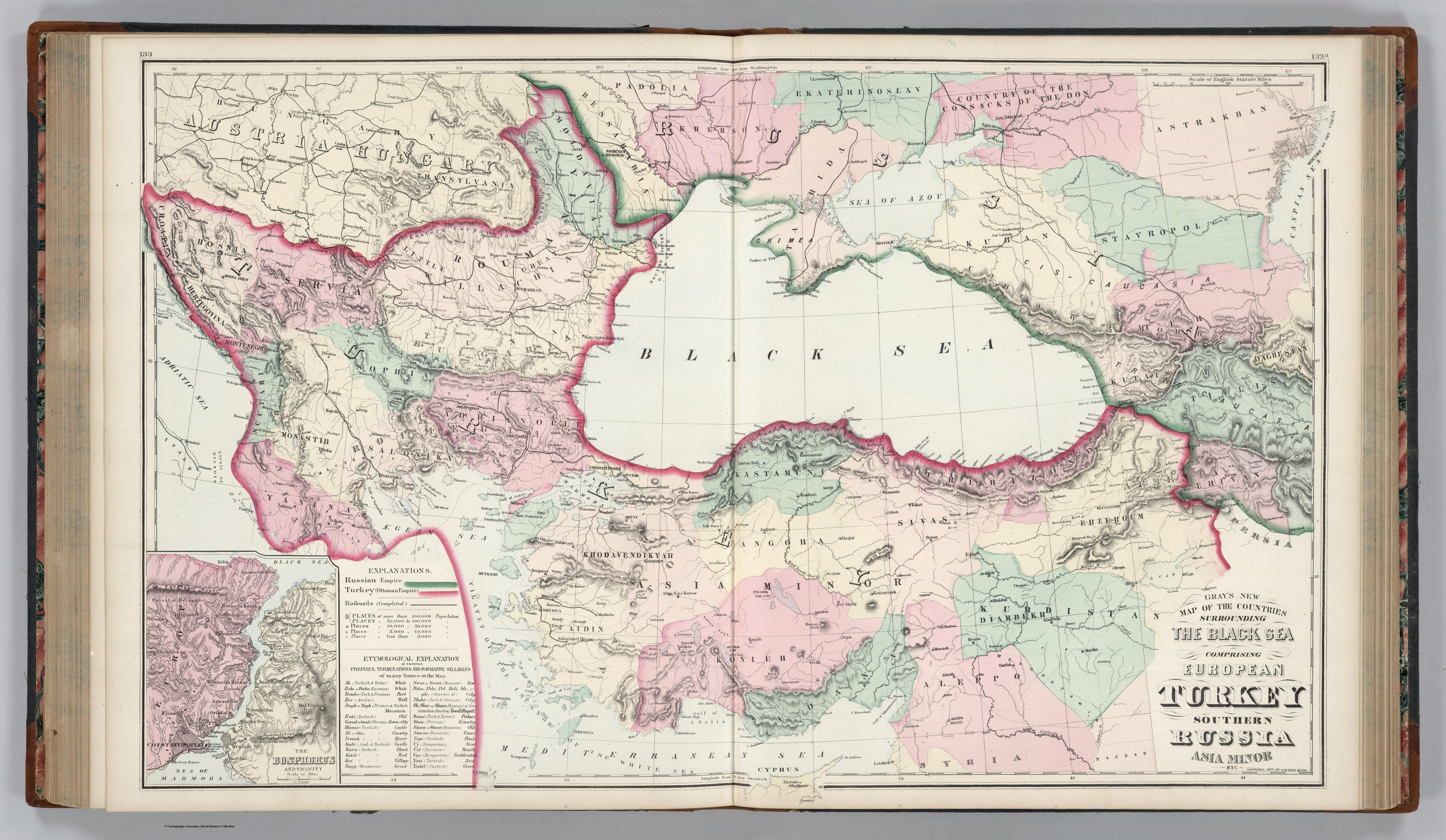
Vilayets in 1877

Vilayets of Europe in 1893

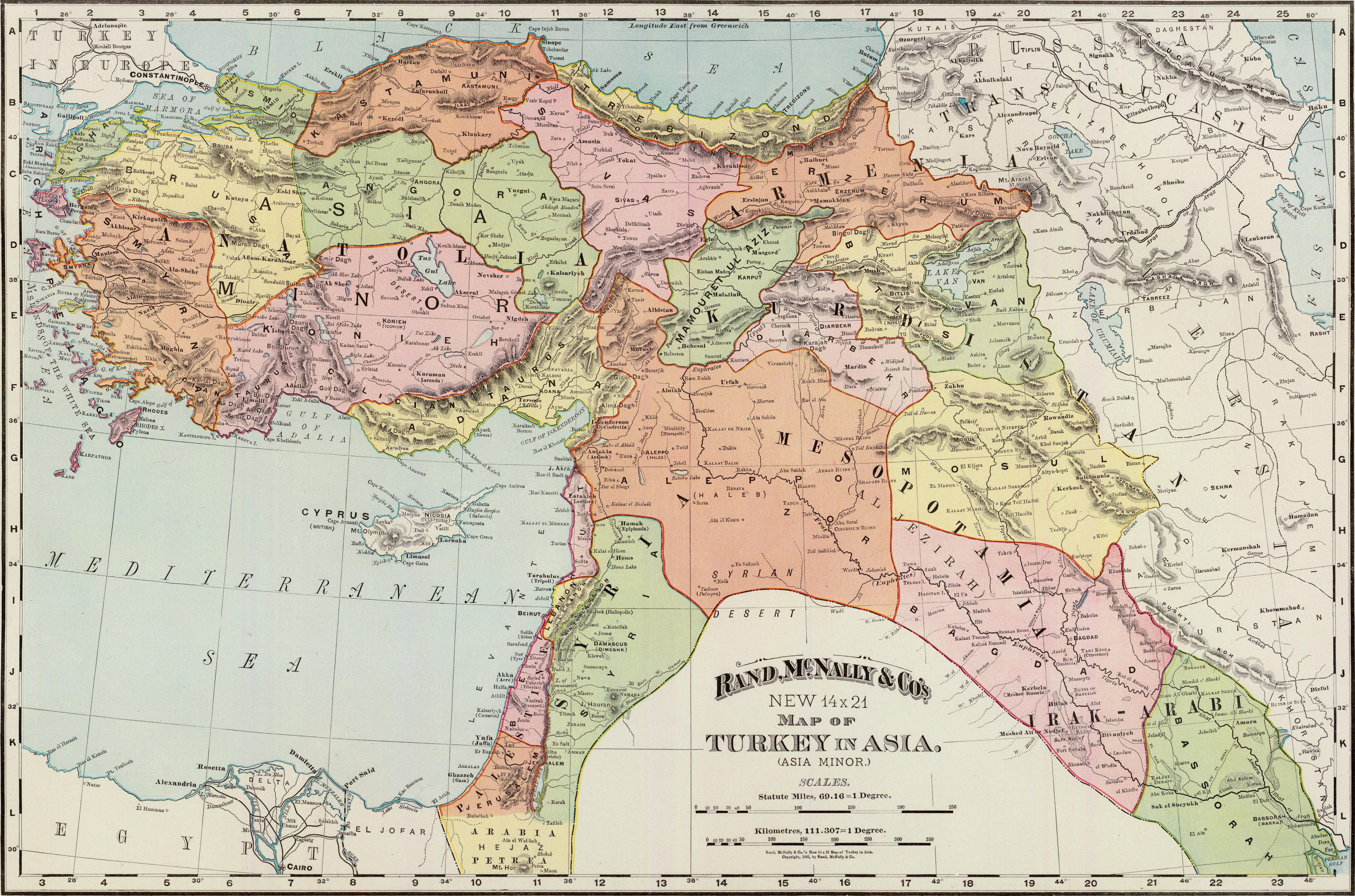
Vilayets of Asia in 1897

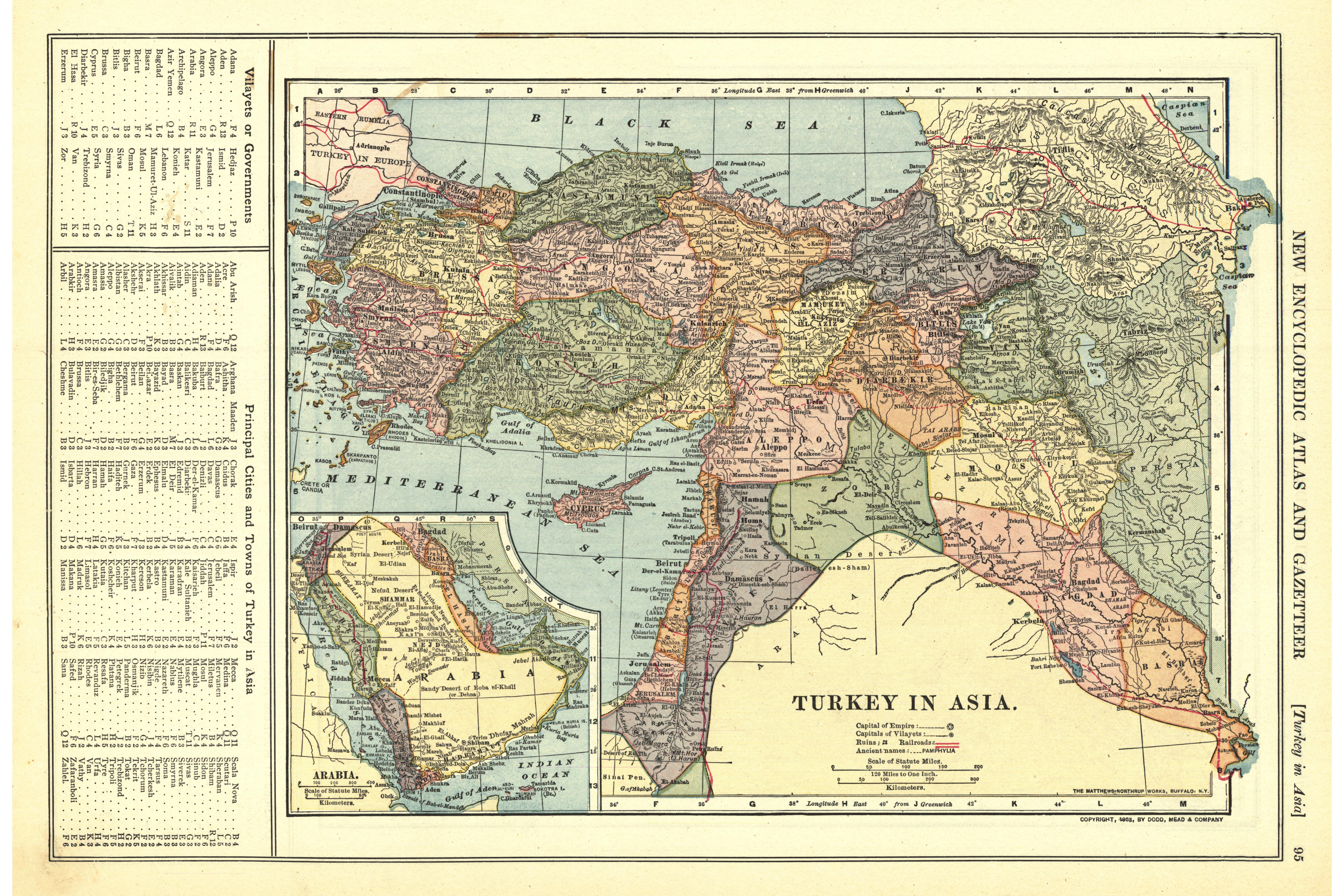
Vilayets of Asia in 1909

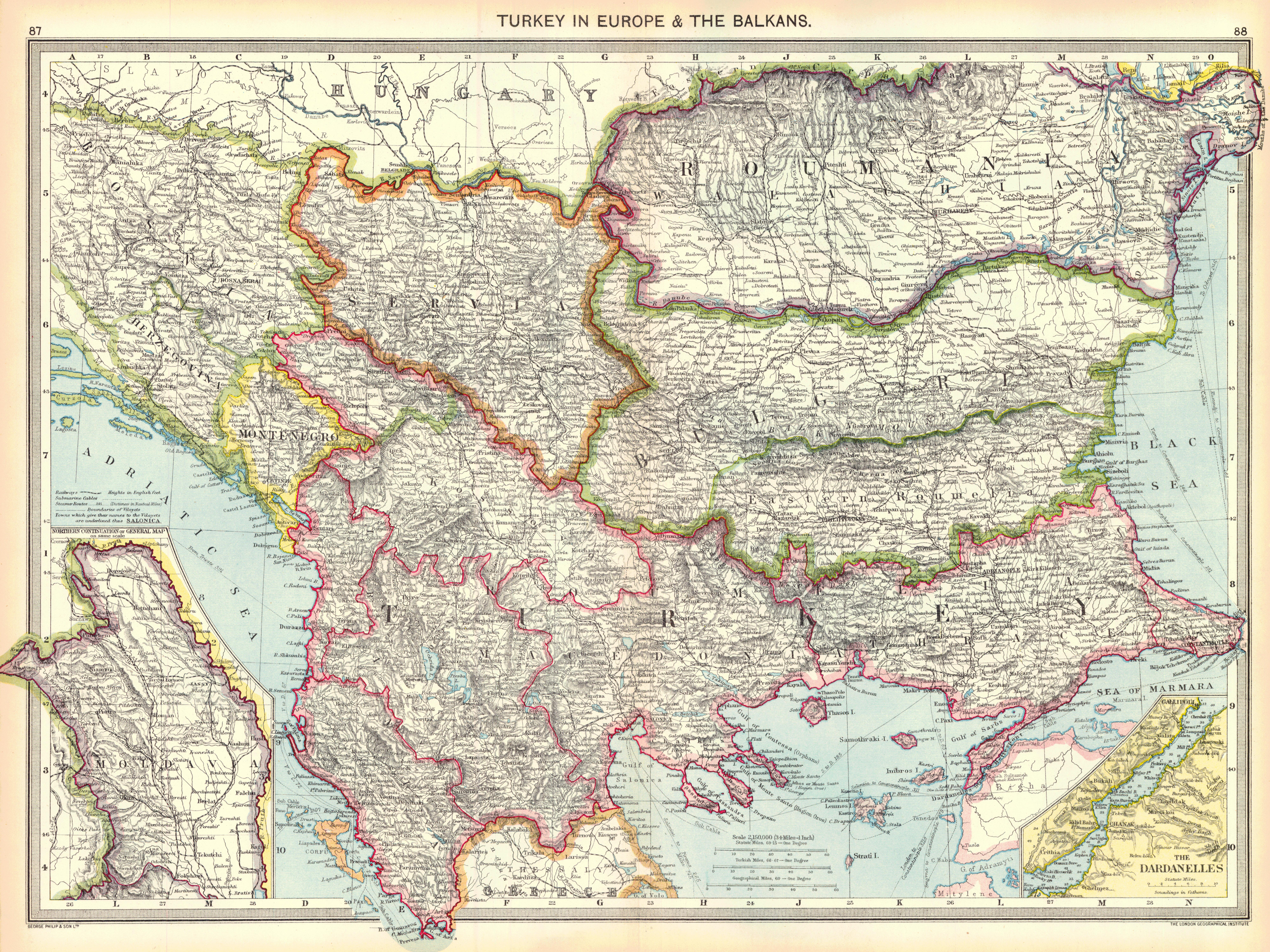
Vilayets of Europe in 1910

Vilayets of Asia in 1911

== See also ==
- Provinces of Turkey
- Six Vilayets, the Armenian vilayets of the empire
- Vilayet Law
