= Konya vilayet =

First-level administrative division of the Ottoman Empire

ولايت قونيه Vilâyet-i Konya
- Vilayet of the Ottoman Empire
- 1867–1923
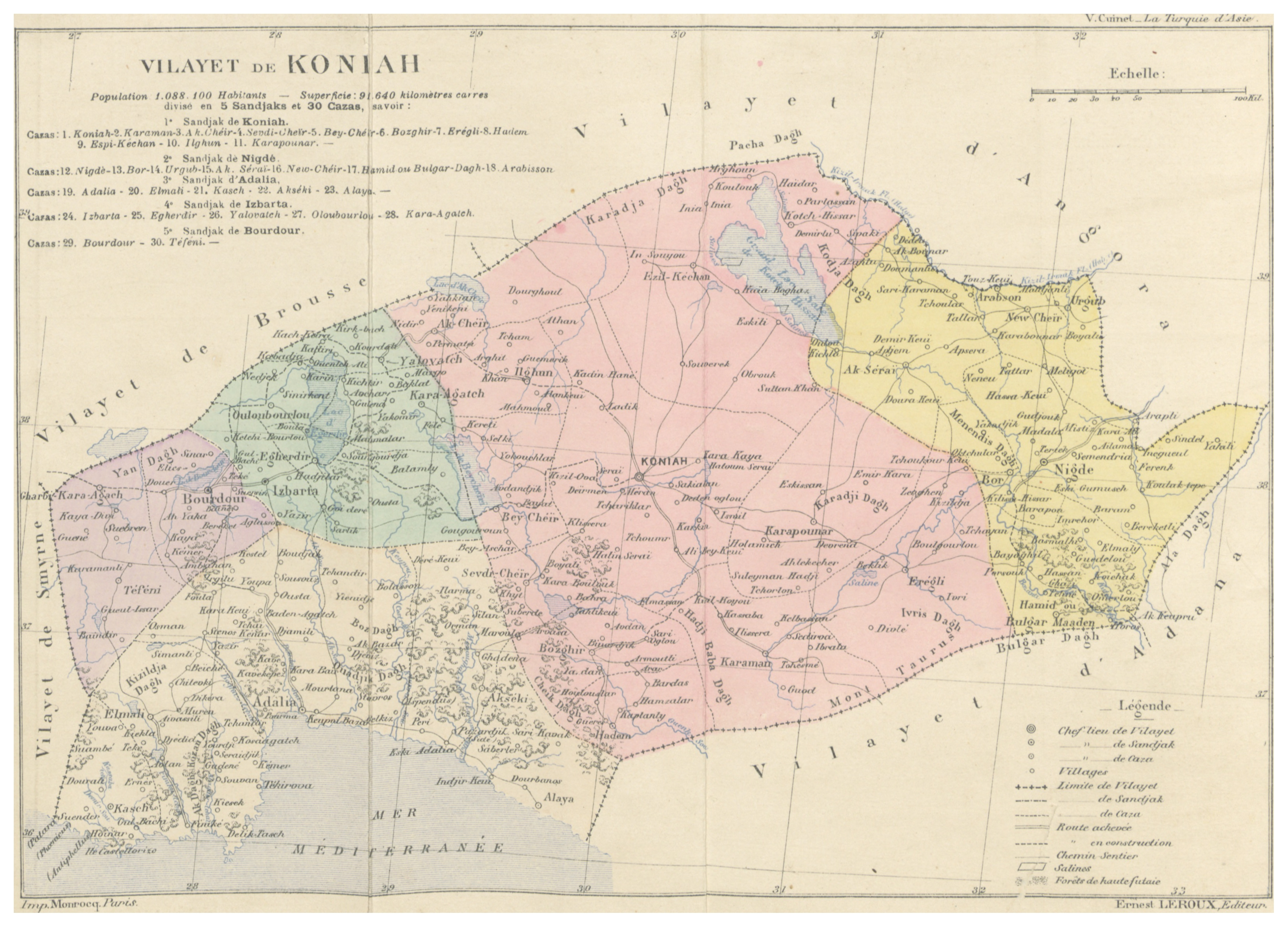
- The Konya Vilayet in 1890
- Capital: Konya
- History
  - Vilayet Law: 1867
  - Disestablished: 1923
| Preceded by | Succeeded by |
| Karaman Eyalet | Turkey |
- Today part of: Turkey

The Vilayet of Konya (Ottoman Turkish: ولايت قونيه, romanized: Vilâyet-i Konya) was a first-level administrative division (vilayet) of the Ottoman Empire in Asia Minor which included the whole, or parts of, the ancient regions of Pamphylia, Pisidia, Phrygia, Lycaonia, Cilicia and Cappadocia.

== Demographics ==
At the beginning of the 20th century, Konya Vilayet reportedly had an area of 91,620 km2, while the preliminary results of the first Ottoman census of 1885 (published in 1908) gave the population as 1,088,100. The accuracy of the population figures ranges from "approximate" to "merely conjectural" depending on the region from which they were gathered. As of 1920, less than 10% of the population was described as being Christian, with the majority of Christian populations by the sea.

== History ==
It was formed in 1864 by adding to the old eyalet of Karaman the western half of Adana, and part of southeastern Anatolia.

== Economy ==
The population was for the most part agricultural and pastoral. The only industries were carpetweaving and the manufacture of cotton and silk stuffs. There were mines of chrome, mercury, sulphur, cinnabar, argentiferous lead and rock salt. The principal exports were salt, minerals, opium, cotton, cereals, wool and livestock; and the imports cloth-goods, coffee, rice and petroleum. The vilayet was traversed by the Anatolian railway, and contained the railhead of the Ottoman line from Smyrna.

== Governors ==
- Ferid Pasha (until late 1902)
- Biren Mahmud Tewfik Bey (Dec 1902 - ?)

== Administrative divisions ==
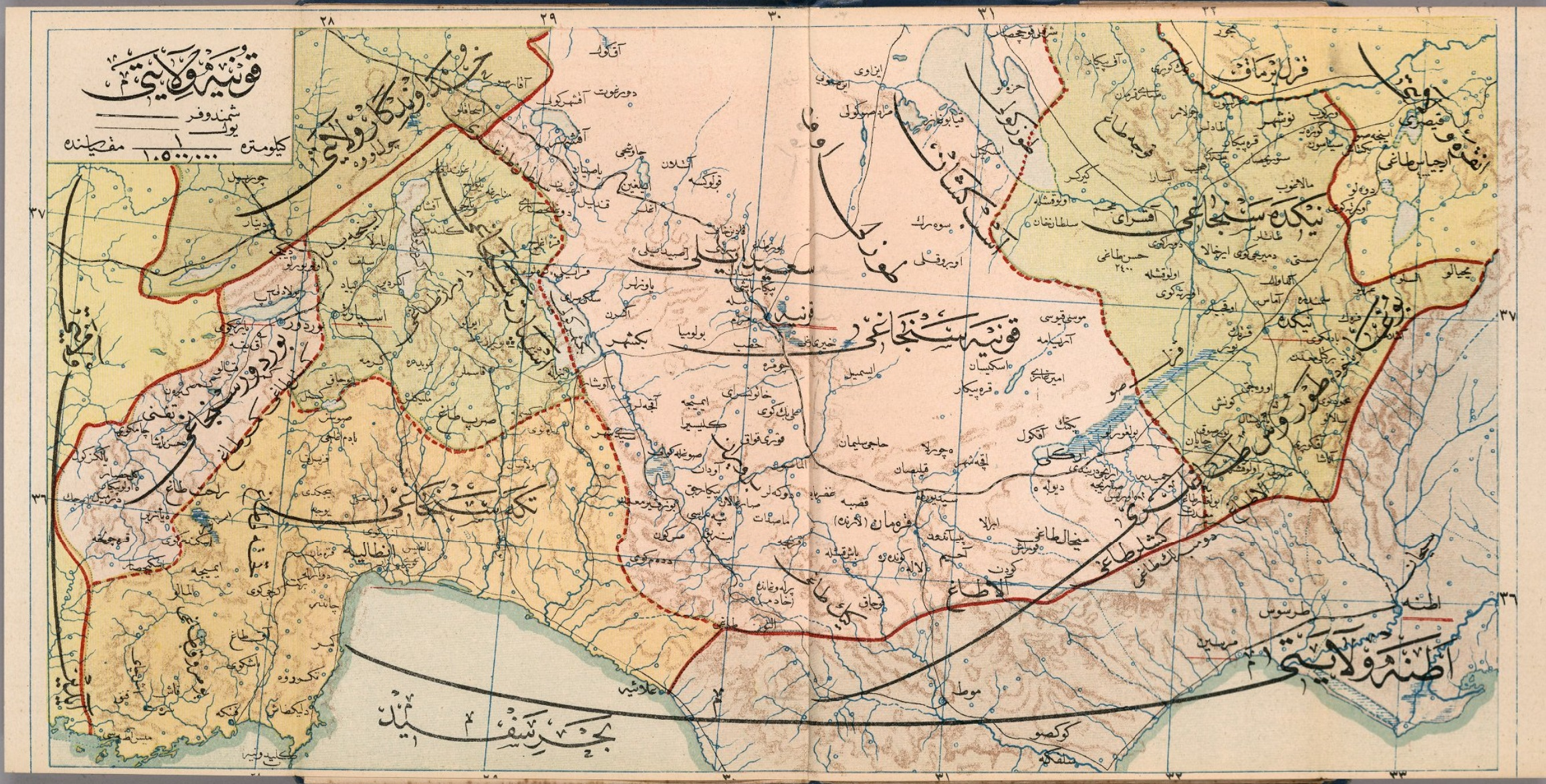
Map of subdivisions of Konya Vilayet in 1907

Sanjaks of the Vilayet:

1. Sanjak of Konya (Konya, Akşehir, Seydişehir, Ilgın, Bozkır, Karaman, Ereğli, Karapınar)
2. Sanjak of Nigde (Niğde, Nevşehir, Ürgüp, Aksaray, Bor, Arapsun)
3. Sanjak of Burdur (Isparta, Uluborlu, Eğirdir, Şarkikaraağaç, Yalvaç)
4. Sanjak of Antalya (Teke) (Antalya, Elmalı, Alanya, Akseki, Kaş)
5. Sanjak of Hamidabad
