= Mamuret-ul-Aziz vilayet =

First-level administrative division of the Ottoman Empire

Mamuret-ul-Aziz Vilayet ولايت معمورة العزيز Vilayet-i Ma'muretül'aziz Vilayet de Mamouret-ul-Aziz
- Vilayet of the Ottoman Empire
- 1879–1923
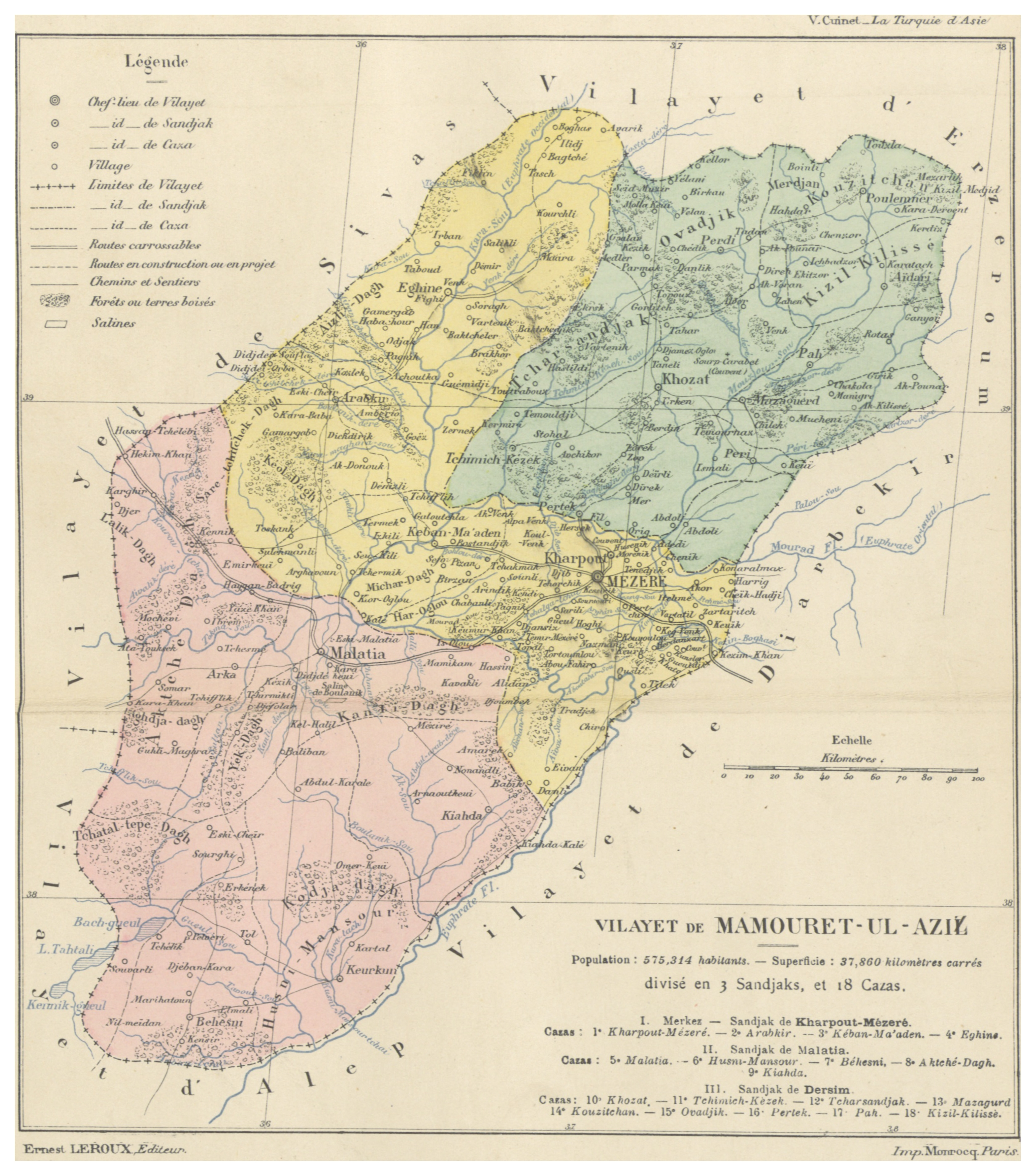
- The Vilayet of Mamuret-ul-Aziz in 1892
- Capital: Mezereh
- Population
  - Muslim, 1914: 446,379
  - Greek, 1914: 971
  - Armenian, 1914: 79,821
- History
  - Established: 1879
  - Disestablished: 1923
Preceded by	Succeeded by
Diyarbekir Vilayet	Turkey

The Vilayet of Mamuret-ul-Aziz, (Note: Vilayet of Ma'muretül'aziz, Redhouse Yeni Türkçe-İngilizce Sözlük, On İkinci Basım, Redhouse Yayınevi, 1991, ISBN 975-413-022-1, p. 729, Ma'mûretü'l-Azîz, Ma'muretül Aziz or Mamûretü'l-Azîz (Ottoman: ولايت معمورة العزيز Vilâyet-i Ma'muretül'azizor معمورة العزيز ولايتى Ma'muretül'aziz Vilâyeti, Ma'muretül'aziz Vilâyeti Salnamesi (The Yearbook of the Vilayet of Ma'muretül'aziz), 1894, Ma'muretül'aziz Vilâyeti Salnamesi "Yearbook of the Vilayet of Ma'muretül'aziz"), Ma'muretül'aziz Vilâyet matbaası, [Elazığ], 1312 [1894]. in the website of HathiTrust Digital Library.) also referred to as Harput Vilayet (Armenian: Խարբերդի վիլայեթ Kharberdi Vilayet’) was a first-level administrative division (vilayet) of the Ottoman Empire in the late 19th and early 20th centuries. It was also one of the Six vilayets. The vilayet was located between Euphrates and Murat river valleys. To the northwest was Sivas Vilayet.

== History ==
The Vilayet of Mamuret-ul-Aziz in 1900

The vilayet was created in 1879-80 from a part of the Diyarbekir Vilayet that included Malatya. In 1888 by an imperial order, Hozat Vilayet was joined to Mamuret ul-Aziz.

Rev. Dr. Herman N. Barnum account of Harpoot in the 1800s,

The city of Harpoot has a population of perhaps 20,000, and it is located a few miles east of the river Euphrates, near latitude thirty-nine, and east from Greenwich about thirty-nine degrees. It is on a mountain facing south, with a populous plain 1,200 feet below it. The Taurus Mountains lie beyond the plain, twelve miles away. The Anti-Taurus range lies some forty miles to the north in full view from the ridge just back of the city. The surrounding population are mostly farmers, and they all live in villages. No city in Turkey is the center of so many Armenian villages, and the most of them are large. Nearly thirty can be counted from different parts of the city. This makes Harpoot a most favorable missionary center. Fifteen out-stations lie within ten miles of the city. The Arabkir field, on the west, was joined to Harpoot in 1865, and the following year…the larger part of the Diarbekir field on the south; so that now the limits of the Harpoot station embrace a district nearly one third as large as new England.

== Demographics ==
At the beginning of the 20th century it reportedly had an area of 14,614 square miles (37,850 km^{2}), while the preliminary results of the first Ottoman census of 1885 (published in 1908) gave the population as 575,314. The accuracy of the population figures ranges from "approximate" to "merely conjectural" depending on the region from which they were gathered.

In 1912, according to the Russian statistics the vilayet of Mamuret-ul-Aziz had 450,000 residents; 182,000 were Turks, 168,000 were Armenians, 95,000 were Kurds and 5,000 were Syriac Orthodox.

== Administrative divisions ==
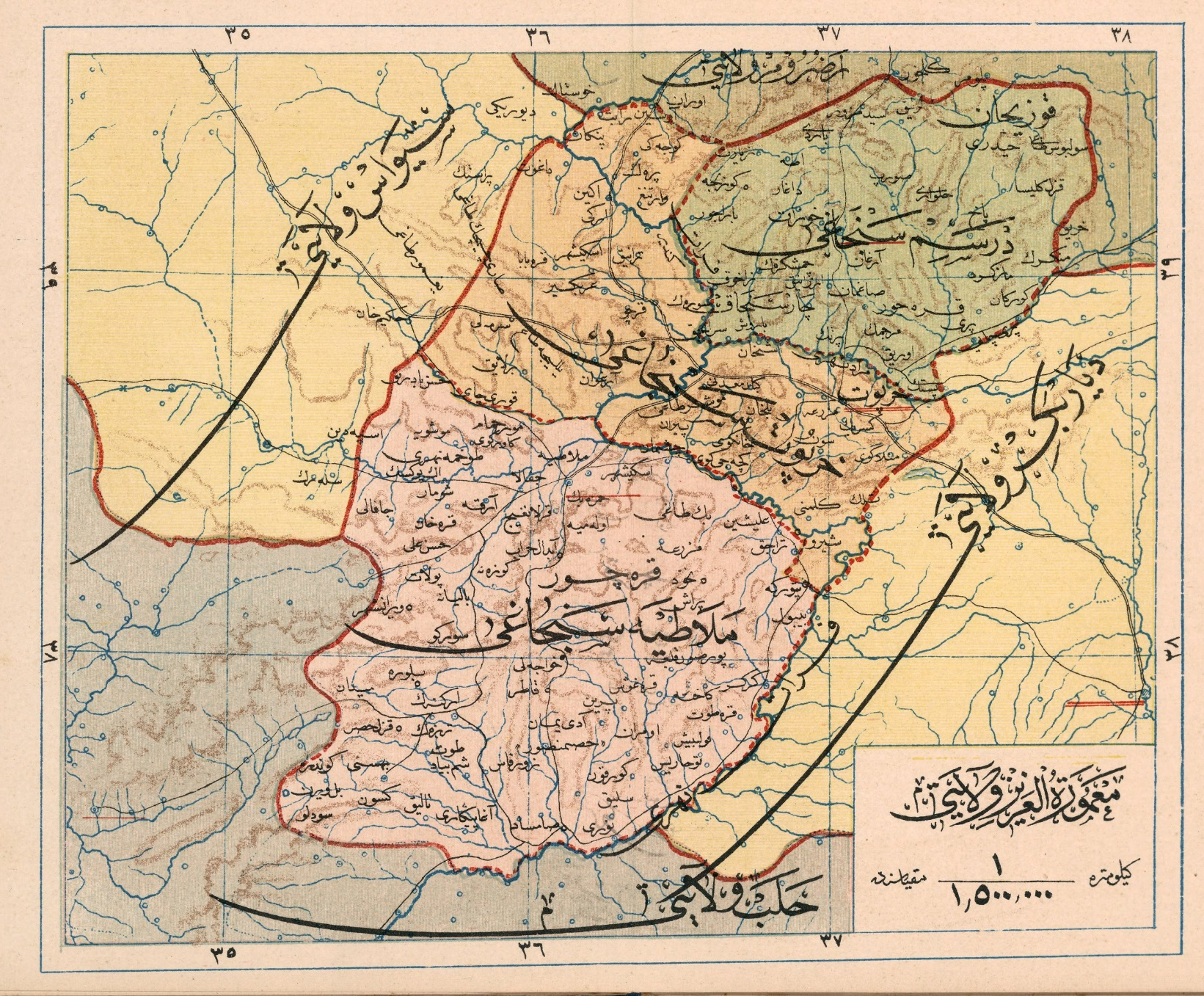
Map of subdivisions of Mamuret-ul-Aziz Vilayet in 1907

Sanjaks of the vilayet:

1. Mamuret-ul-Aziz Sanjak (Ma'muretül'aziz, Kemaliye, Arapgir, Pütürge)
2. Malatya Sanjak (Malatya, Besni, Adıyaman, Kâhta, Akçadağ)
3. Dersim Sanjak (Hozat, Tunceli, Çemişgezek, Akpazar, Ovacık, Nazımiye, Mazgirt)
