= Angora vilayet =

First-level administrative division of the Ottoman Empire

ولايت آنقره Vilâyet-i Ânḳara
- Vilayet of the Ottoman Empire
- 1867–1922
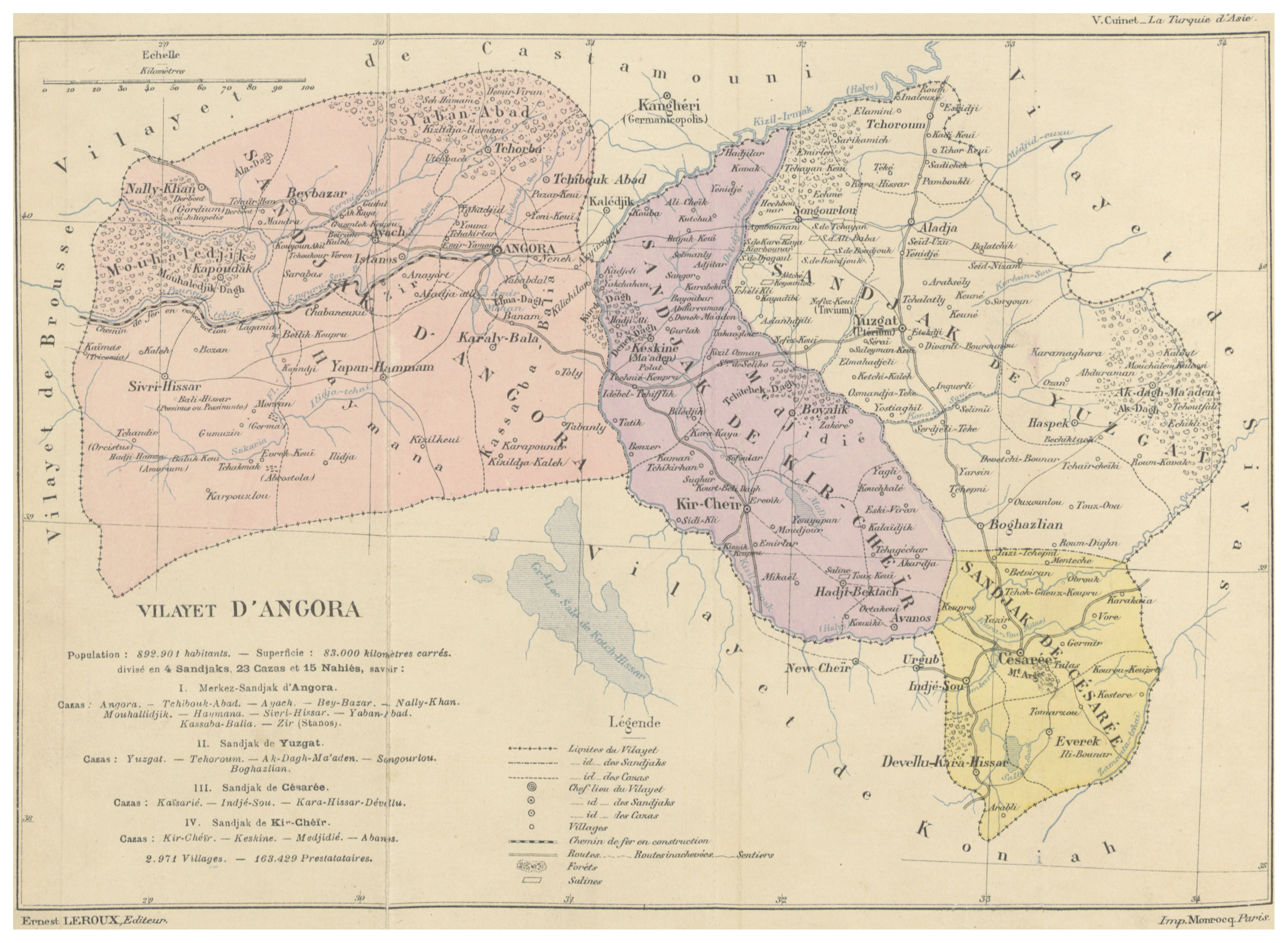
- The Angora Vilayet in 1890
- Capital: Angora (Ankara)
- History
  - Vilayet Law: 1867
  - Disestablished: 1922
Preceded by	Succeeded by
Ankara Eyalet	Ankara Province
- Today part of: Turkey

The Vilayet of Angora (Ottoman Turkish: ولايت آنقره, romanized: Vilâyet-i Ankara) or Ankara was a first-level administrative division (vilayet) of the Ottoman Empire, centered on the city of Angora (Ankara) in north-central Anatolia, which included most of ancient Galatia.

== Demographics ==
At the beginning of the 20th century, it reportedly had an area of 32,339 square miles (83,760 km^{2}), while the preliminary results of the first Ottoman census of 1885 (published in 1908) gave the population as 892,901. The accuracy of the population figures ranges from "approximate" to "merely conjectural" depending on the region from which they were gathered. As of 1920, The population of Angora Vilayat is consisted mostly Muslim Turks . Also Armenian Minority was exist .

== Economy ==
It was an agricultural country, depending for its prosperity on its grain, wool and the mohair obtained from the Angora goats. An important industry was carpet-weaving at Kırşehir and Kayseri. There were mines of silver, copper, lignite and salt, and many hot springs, including some of great repute medicinally. Rock salt and fuller's earth was also mined in the area.

Weaving was a popular industry in the vilayet but declined after the introduction of the railroad, where locals would export wool and mohair instead of weaving it. A small carpet industry was also found in the region in the early 20th century.

== Administrative divisions ==
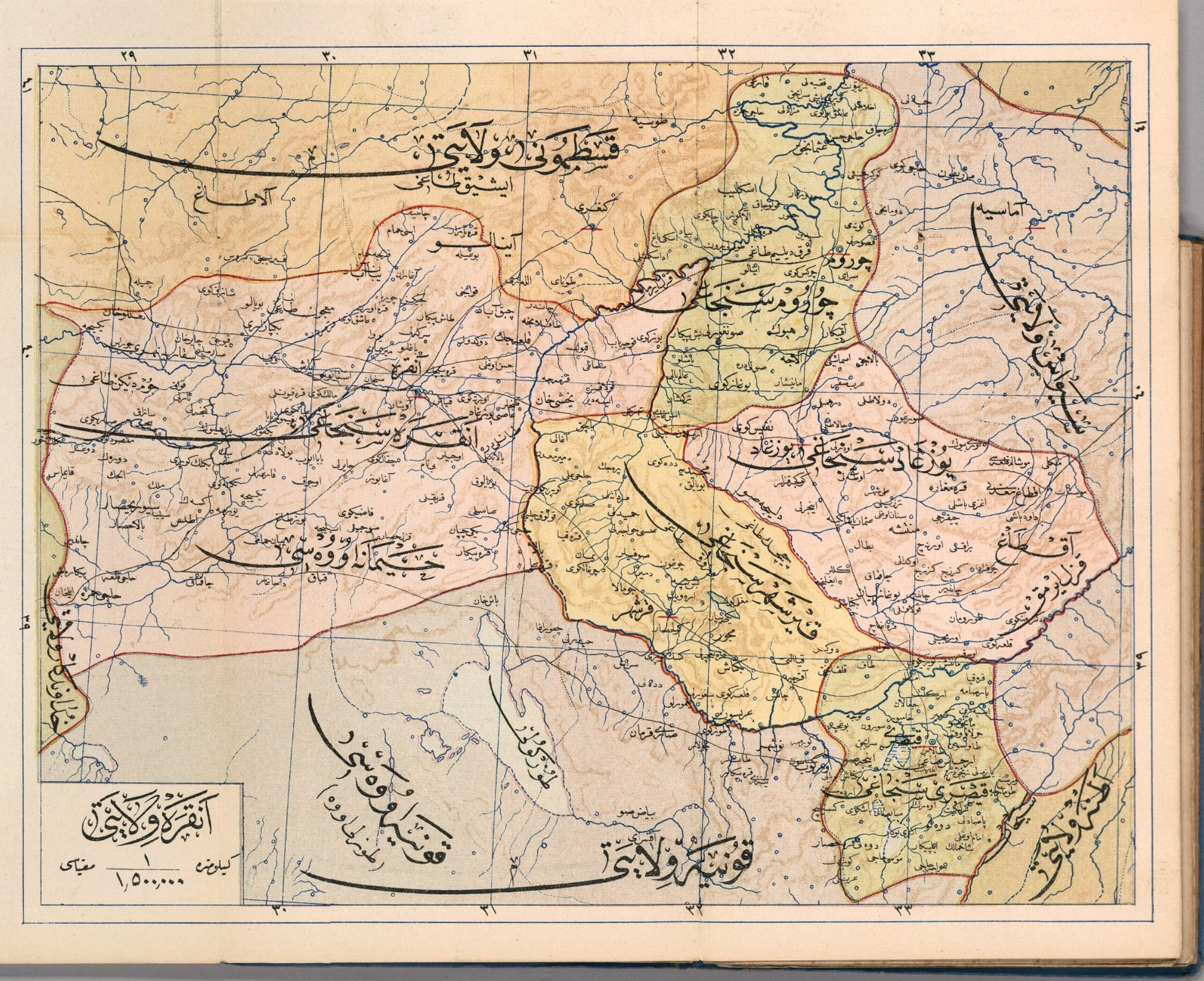
Map of subdivisions of Angora Vilayet in 1907

Sanjaks of the Vilayet:

1. Sanjak of Ankara (Ankara, Ayaş, Beypazarı, Sivrihisar, Çubuk, Nallıhan, Haymana, Kızılcahamam, Mihalıççık, Balâ, Kalecik)
2. Sanjak of Bozok (Yozgat, Akdağmadeni, Boğazlıyan)
3. Sanjak of Kayseri (Kayseri, Develi, İncesu)
4. Sanjak of Kırşehir (Kırşehir, Mucur, Hacıbektaş, Keskin, Çiçekdağı, Avanos)
5. Sanjak of Çorum (Çorum, Osmancık, Kargı, Sungurlu, İskilip)
