= Trebizond vilayet =

First-level administrative division of the Ottoman Empire

ولايت طربزون Vilâyet-i Ṭrabzōn Vilayet de Trébizonde
- Vilayet of the Ottoman Empire
- 1867–1922
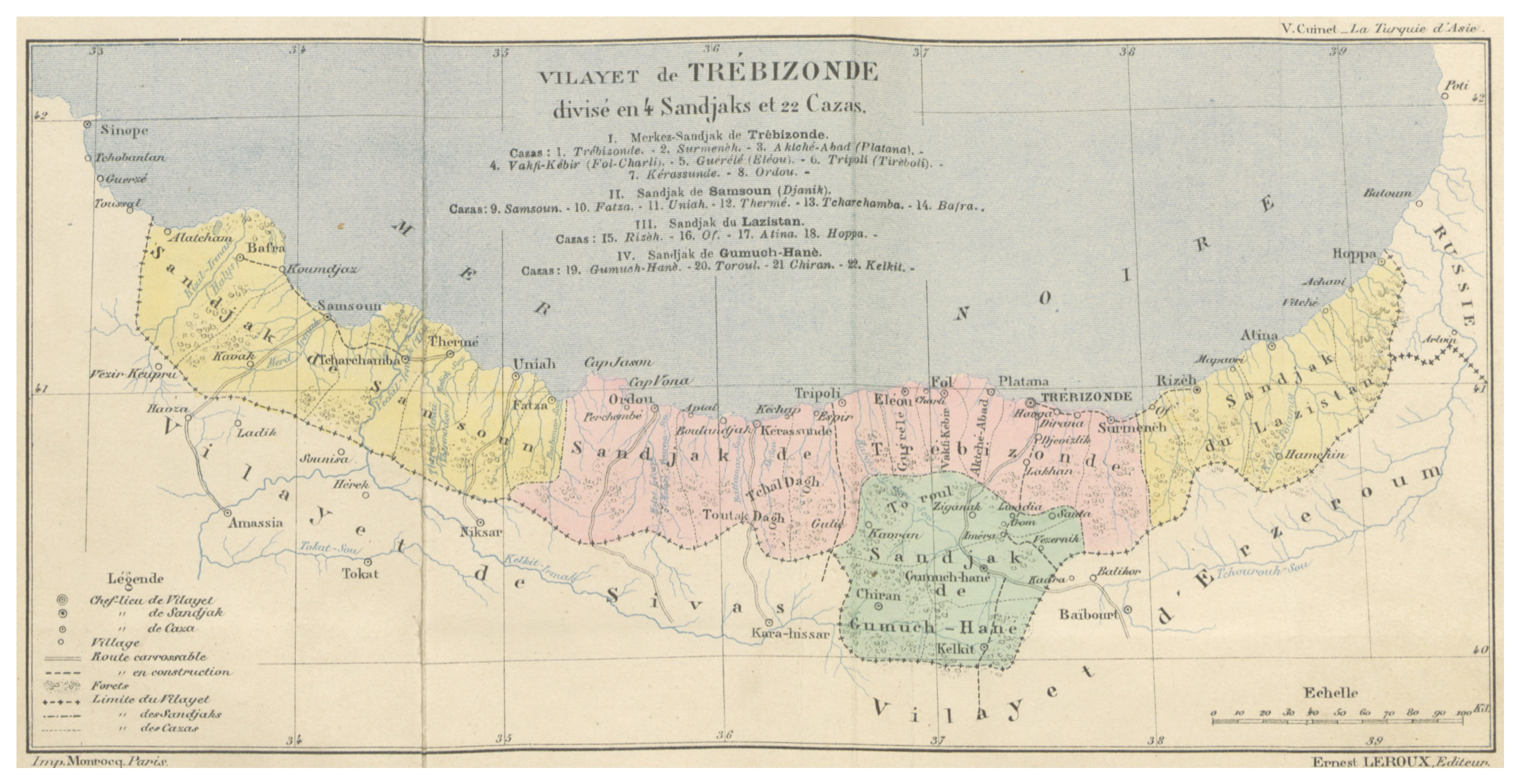
- The Trebizond Vilayet in 1890
- Capital: Trabizond
- History
  - Vilayet Law: 1867
  - Disestablished: 1922
Preceded by
Trebizond Eyalet
Succeeded by
Giresun Province
Gümüşhane Province
Ordu Province
Rize Province
Samsun Province
Trabzon Province
Kutais Governorate
- Today part of: Turkey

The Vilayet of Trebizond (Ottoman Turkish: ولايت طربزون, romanized: Vilâyet-i Ṭrabzōn; French: Vilayet de Trébizonde) was a first-level administrative division (vilayet) in the north-eastern part of the Ottoman Empire, corresponding to the area along the eastern Black Sea coastline and the interior highland region of the Pontic Alps.

At the beginning of the 20th century, it reportedly had an area of 12,082 square miles (31,290 km^{2}), while the preliminary results of the first Ottoman census of 1885 (published in 1908) gave the population as 1,047,700. The accuracy of the population figures ranges from "approximate" to "merely conjectural" depending on the region from which they were gathered.

After the Russian-Turkish War of 1877–1878, the sanjak of Lazistan was established. Rize became the center of the district due to the cession of Batumi, the former centre of the sanjak, to Russia with kaza of Artvin. The salname of the year 1344h/1904-1905 mentioned several Armenian pharmacists. The Vilayet also counted with a considerable Pontic Greek population.

During World War I eastern half of vilayet (Kazas of Görele, Vakfıkebir, Akçaabat, Trabzon, Of and Maçka with sanjaks of Lazistan and Gümüşhane) was occupied by Russian troops by summer 1916. It was retaken by Ottomans in 1918.

== Demographics ==
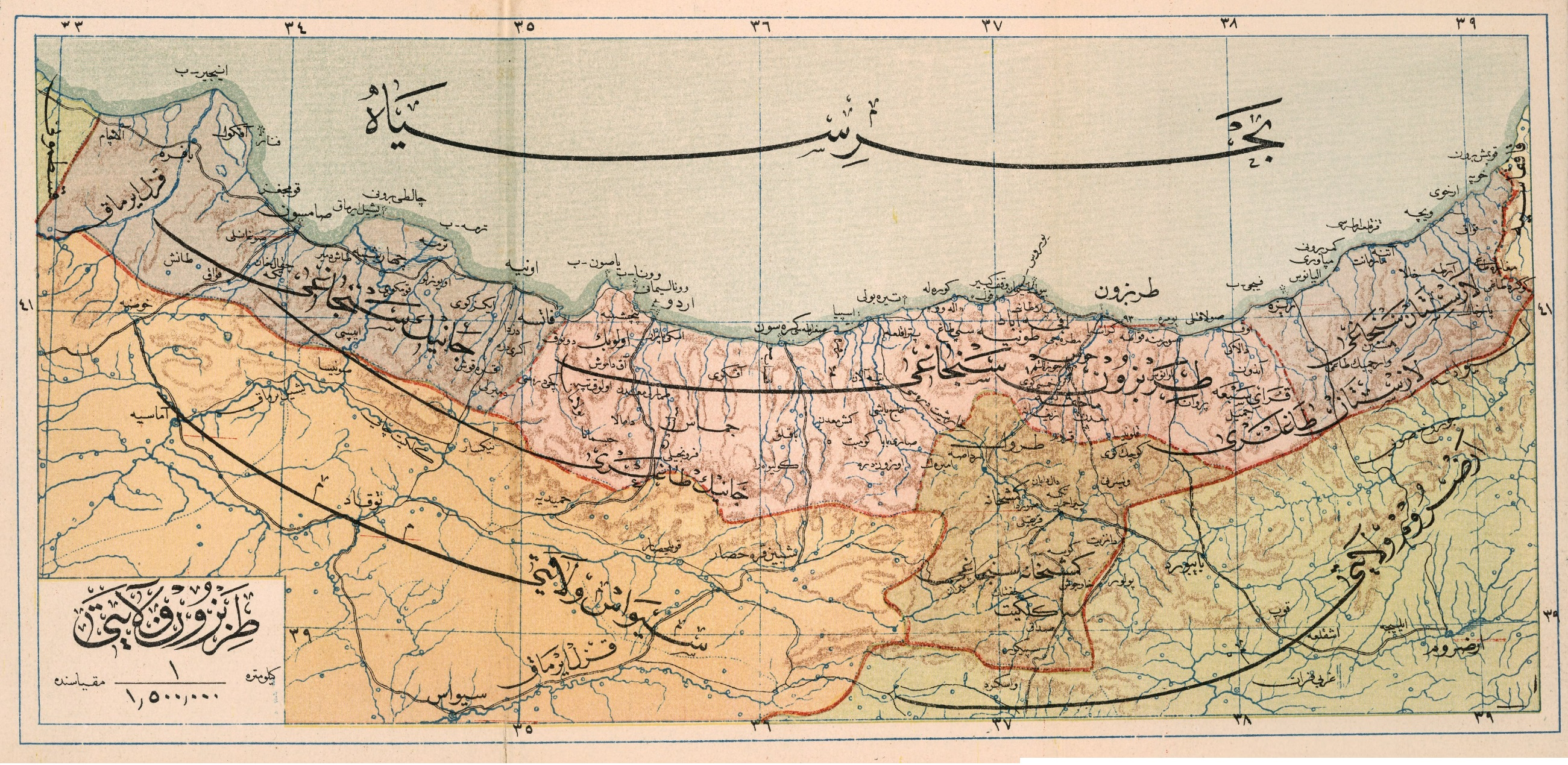
Map of subdivisions of Trebizond Vilayet in 1907

The Sanjak of Trabzon had a Muslim majority since the 16th century. Western estimates given in the 19th century about the City of Trabzon estimate a Turkish majority.

=== Census of 1914 ===
Ethno-religious composition of the districts of the Trabzon vilayet 1914
Sanjak/Kaza	Muslims	Greek Orthodox	Armenian	Jewish	Others (Note: Armenian Catholics and Protestants)	Total
Trabzon	64,726	23,806	14,846	8	1,472	104,858
Ordu	111,421	18,505	12,349	–	1,216	143,491
Of	75,050	1,819	–	–	–	76,869
Akçaabat	56,401	6,561	3,517	–	–	66,479
Tirebolu	48,999	10,530	868	–	-	60,397
Sürmene	57,698	9,762	323	-	–	67,783
Giresun	92,301	24,138	2,275	–	–	118,714
Görele	42,823	1,648	312	–	–	44,783
Vakfıkebir	28.484	13	51	–	–	28,548
Maçka	17,950	19,575	258	–	-	37,783
Trabzon Sanjak	595,853	116,357	36,149	8	2,668	749,705
Lazistan (Rize)	122,055	1,507	5	–	–	123,567
Atina	50,297	171	28	–	–	50,496
Hopa	38,156	44	2	–	–	38,202
Lazistan sanjak	210,508	1,722	35	-	-	212,265
Gümüşhane	29,639	9,179	1,817	–	–	40,635
Şiran	29,686	30,547	24	-	–	60,257
Torul	22,312	3,155	392	–	–	25,859
Kelkit	33,130	614	482	–	–	34,226
Gümüşhane sanjak	114,767	43,495	2,715	-	-	160,977
Canik (Samsun)	44,992	54,709	4,791	18	533	105,044
Ünye	58,351	5,251	5,861	9	–	69,472
Bafra	48,944	30.838	1,735		–	81,517
Fatsa	35,678	3,026	1,250	–	385	40,339
Çarşamba	54,353	3,948	10,820	–	609	69,730
Terme	23,632	967	2,601	–	–	27,200
Canik sanjak	265,950	98,739	27,319	27	1,267	393,302
Total	1,187,078	260,313	64,607	35	3,935	1,516,249

== Administrative divisions ==
The vilayet included three sanjaks (four after 1889) and 22 kazas. Sanjaks of the Vilayet:

1. Trabzon Sanjak (Trabzon, Ordu, Giresun, Tirebolu, Görele, Vakfıkebir, Sürmene, Of, Akçaabat, Maçka)
2. Gümüşhane Sanjak (Gümüşhane, Kelkit, Şiran, Torul)
3. Lazistan Sanjak (Its center was Batumi at first until 1878, later Rize after 1878) (Rize, Atina, Artvin; Sometimes included Of as well)
4. Canik Sanjak (Its center was Samsun after 1889) (Samsun, Bafra, Ünye, Fatsa, Çarşamba, Terme)
