= Ottoman Syria =

Region of Syria under Ottoman rule (1516–1918)

- Region of the Ottoman Empire
- 1516–1918
- Flag of the Ottoman Empire

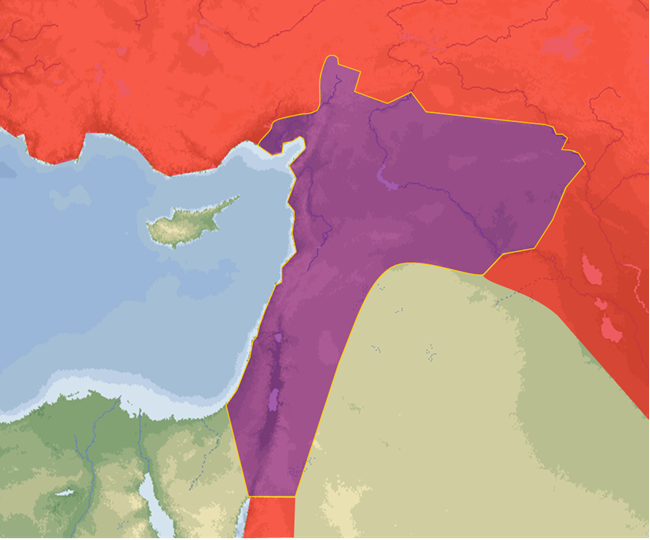
- Ottoman territories which correspond with the Syrian provinces are shown in purple
- Capital: Administered from Constantinople
- Area
  - Coordinates: 34°N 37°E
- Government
  - Type: Monarchy
- History
  - Battle of Marj Dabiq: 1516
  - First Egyptian–Ottoman War: 1831–1833
  - Second Egyptian–Ottoman War: 1839–1841
  - Sinai and Palestine campaign: 1918
Preceded by	Succeeded by
Mamluk Sultanate	Occupied Enemy Territory Administration

Ottoman Syria (Arabic: سوريا العثمانية) is a historiographical term used to describe the group of divisions of the Ottoman Empire within the region of the Levant, usually defined as being east of the Mediterranean Sea, west of the Euphrates River, north of the Arabian Desert and south of the Taurus Mountains.

Ottoman Syria was organized by the Ottomans upon conquest from the Mamluk Sultanate in the early 16th century as a single eyalet (province) of the Damascus Eyalet. In 1534, the Aleppo Eyalet was split into a separate administration. The Tripoli Eyalet was formed out of Damascus province in 1579 and later the Adana Eyalet was split from Aleppo. In 1660, the Eyalet of Safed was established and shortly afterwards renamed the Sidon Eyalet; in 1667, the Mount Lebanon Emirate was given special autonomous status within the Sidon province, but was abolished in 1842 and reconfigured in 1861 as the Mount Lebanon Mutasarrifate. The Syrian eyalets were later transformed into the Syria Vilayet, the Aleppo Vilayet and the Beirut Vilayet, following the 1864 Tanzimat reforms. Finally, in 1872, the Mutasarrifate of Jerusalem was split from the Syria Vilayet into an autonomous administration with a special status.

== History ==
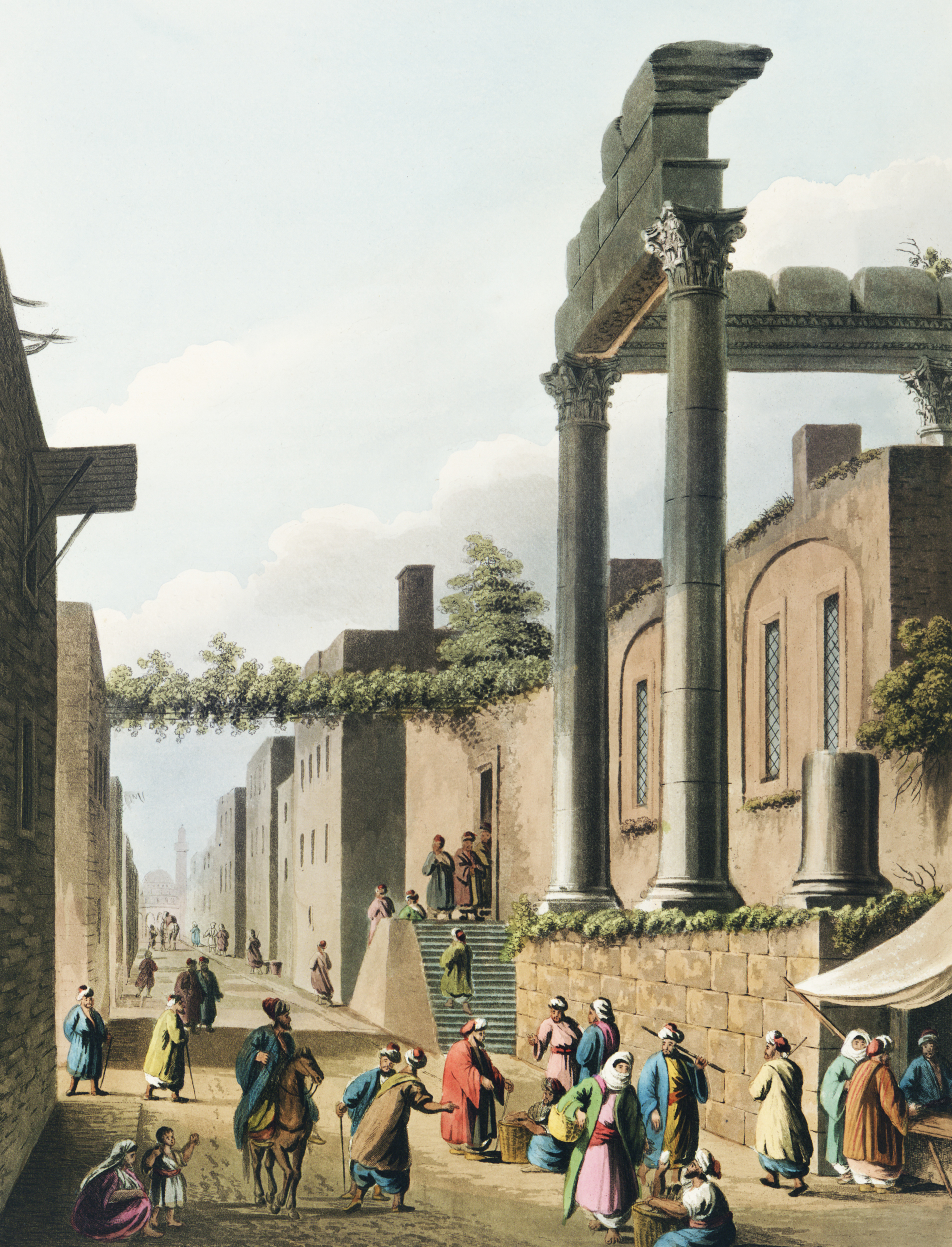
Mosque at Latakia, from Views in the Ottoman Dominions, in Europe, in Asia, and some of the Mediterranean islands (1810) illustrated by Luigi Mayer (1755–1803).

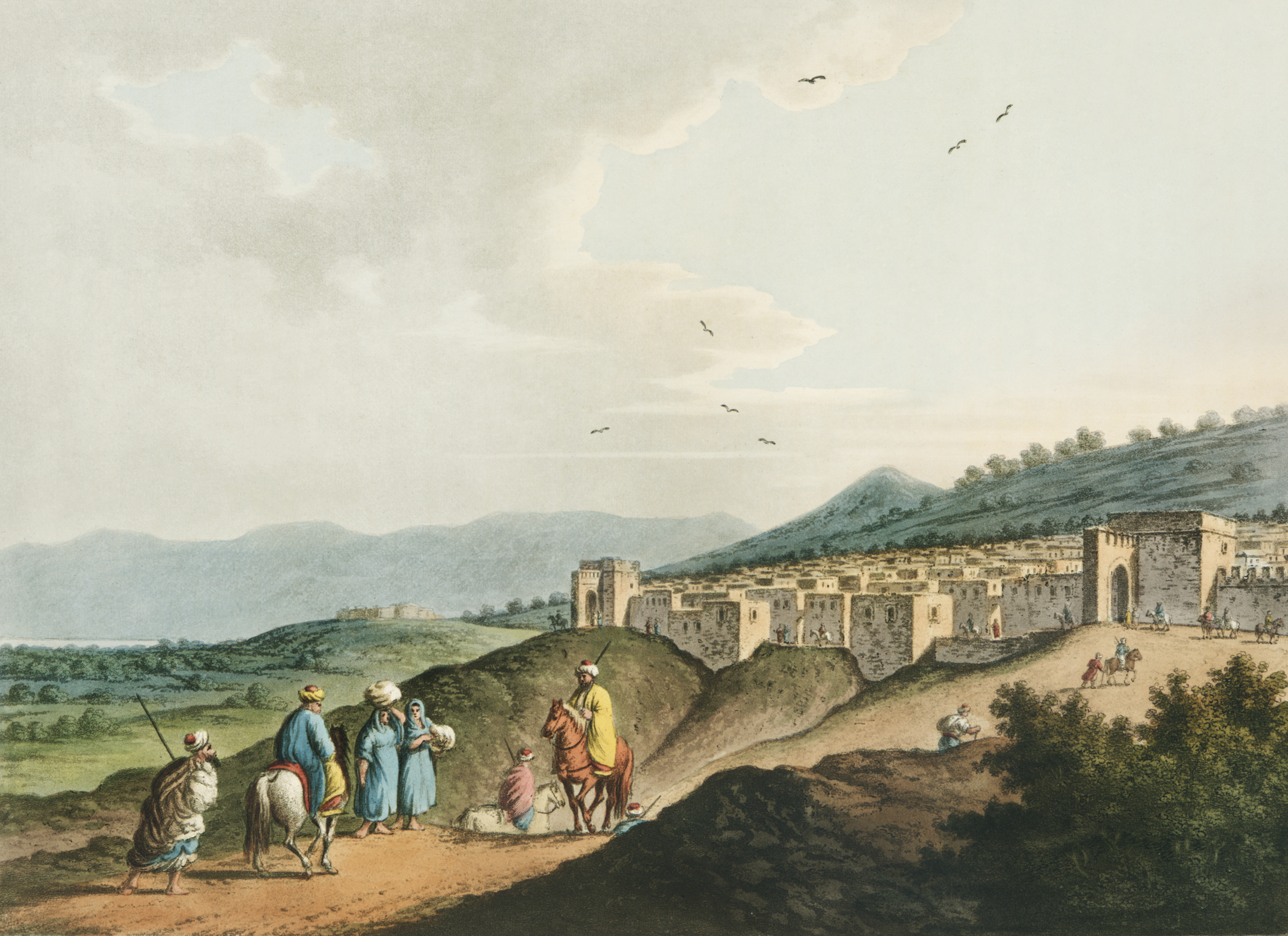
Town of Bethlehem, Ottoman Syria from an 1810 illustration by Luigi Mayer.

Before 1516, Syria was part of the Mamluk Empire centered in Lower Egypt. The Ottoman Sultan Selim I conquered Syria in 1516 after defeating the Mamlukes at the Battle of Marj Dabiq near Aleppo in northern Syria. Selim carried on his victorious campaign against the Mamlukes and conquered Egypt in 1517 following the Battle of Ridanieh, bringing an end to the Mamluk Sultanate.

== Administrative divisions ==
When he first seized Syria in 1516, Selim I kept the administrative subdivisions of the Mamluk period unchanged. After he came back from Egypt in July 1517, he reorganized Syria into one large province or eyalet named Şam (Arabic/Turkish for "Syria"). The eyalet was subdivided into several districts or sanjaks.

=== 1549–1663 ===
In 1549, Syria was reorganized into two eyalets. The northern Sanjak of Aleppo became the center of the new Eyalet of Aleppo. At this time, the two Syrian Eyalets were subdivided as follows:

- The Eyalet of Aleppo (Arabic: إيالة حلب)
  - The Sanjak of Aleppo (حلب)
  - The Sanjak of Adana (أضنة)
  - The Sanjak of Ablistan (Marash (مرعش))
  - The Sanjak of Aintab (عينتاب)
  - The Sanjak of Birejik (البيرة) (Urfa (أورفة))
  - The Sanjak of Kilis (كلز)
  - The Sanjak of Ma'arra (معرة النعمان)
  - The Sanjak of Hama (حماة)
  - The Sanjak of Salamiyah (سلمية)
  - The Sanjak of Homs (حمص)
- The Eyalet of Damascus (Arabic: إيالة دمشق)
  - The Sanjak of Damascus (دمشق)
  - The Sanjak of Tripoli (طرابلس)
  - The Sanjak of Acre (عكا)
  - The Sanjak of Safad (صفد)
  - The Sanjak of Nablus (نابلس)
  - The Sanjak of Jerusalem (القدس)
  - The Sanjak of Lajjun (اللجون)
  - The Sanjak of Salt (السلط)
  - The Sanjak of Gaza (غزة)

In 1579, the Eyalet of Tripoli was established under the name of Tripoli of Syria (Turkish: Trablusşam; Arabic: طرابلس الشام). At this time, the eyalets became as follows:

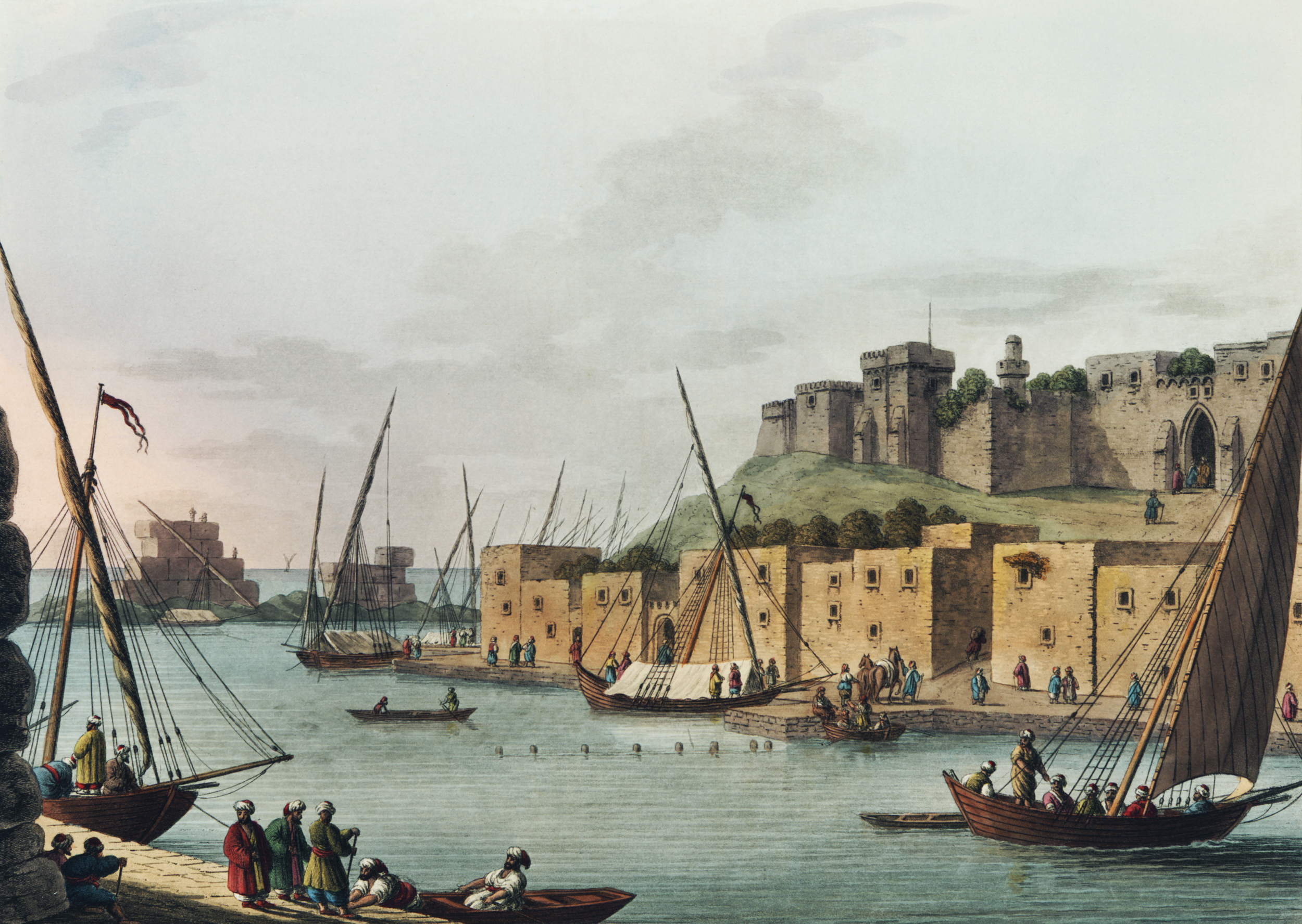
Tartus in Ottoman Syria, from an 1810 illustration by Luigi Mayer.

The Eyalet of Aleppo included the Sanjaks of Aleppo, Adana, Marash, Aintab, and Urfa.

The Eyalet of Tripoli included the Sanjaks of Tripoli, Latakia, Hama and Homs.

The Eyalet of Damascus included the Sanjaks of Damascus, Beirut, Sidon (Sidon-Beirut), Acre, Safad, Nablus, Jerusalem, Gaza, Hauran and Ma'an.

In 1660, the Eyalet of Safad was established. It was later renamed the Eyalet of Sidon, and later, the Eyalet of Beirut.

=== 1831–1841 ===
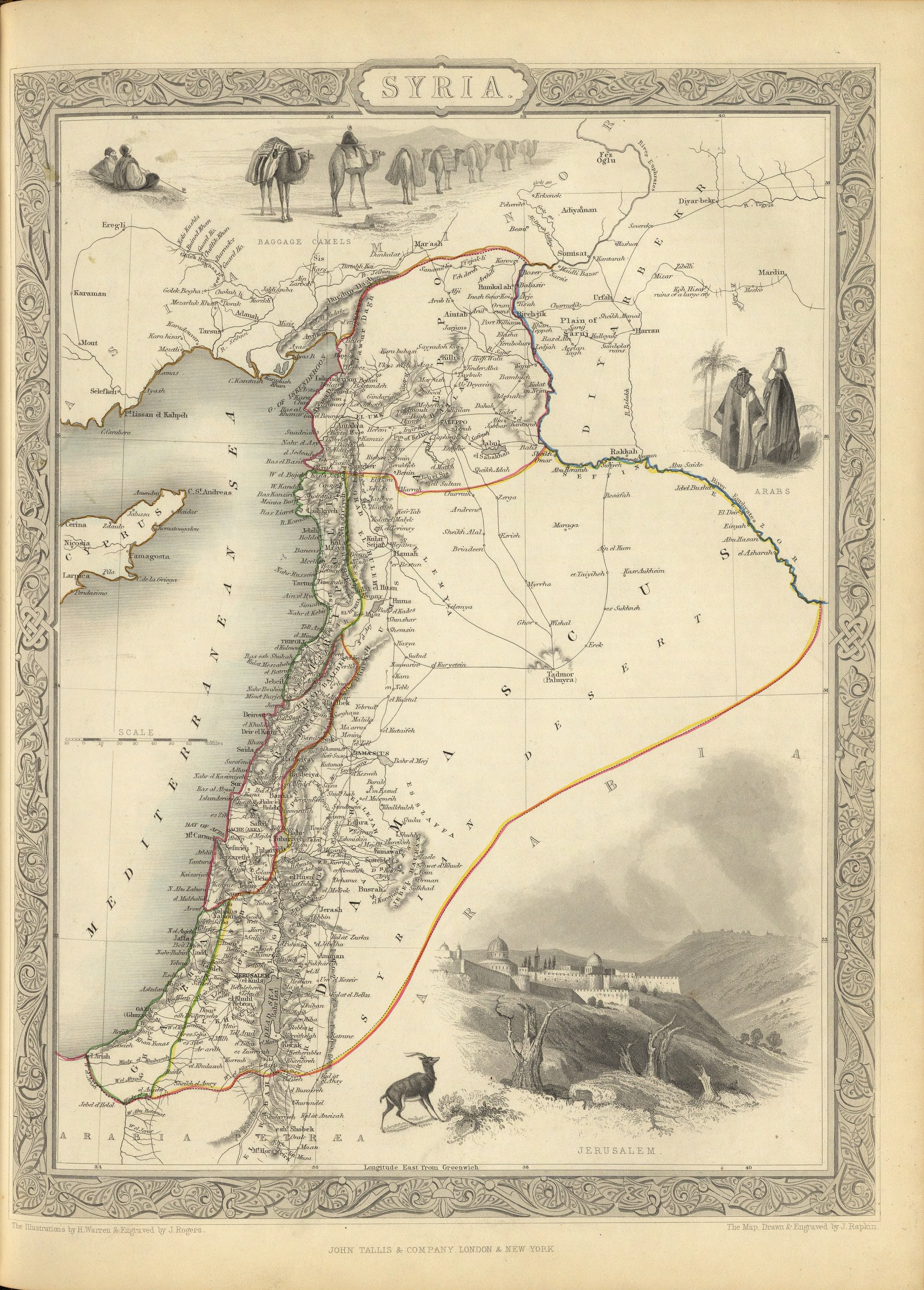
1851 map of Ottoman Syria, showing the Eyalets of Aleppo, Damascus, Tripoli, Acre and Gaza.

In 1833, the Syrian provinces were ceded to Muhammed Ali of Egypt in the Convention of Kutahya. The firman stated that "The governments of Candia and Egypt are continued to Mahomet Ali. And in reference to his special claim, I have granted him the provinces of Damascus, Tripoli-in-Syria, Sidon, Saphet, Aleppo, the districts of Jerusalem and Nablous, with the conduct of pilgrims and the commandment of the Tcherde (the yearly offering to the tomb of the Prophet). His son, Ibrahim Pacha, has again the title of Sheikh and Harem of Mekka, and the district of Jedda; and farther, I have acquiesced in his request to have the district of Adana ruled by the Treasury of Taurus, with the title of Mohassil."

In this period, the Sublime Porte's firmans (decrees) of 1839 and, more decisively, of 1856 – equalizing the status of Muslim and non-Muslim subjects – produced a dramatic alienation of Muslims from Christians. In the words of one writer, "The former resented the implied loss of superiority and recurrently assaulted and massacred Christian communities – in Aleppo in 1850, in Nablus in 1856, and in Damascus and Lebanon in 1860. Among the long-term consequences of these bitter internecine conflicts were the emergence of a Christian-dominated Lebanon in the 1920s – 40s and the deep fissure between Christian and Muslim Palestinian Arabs as they confronted the Zionist influx after World War I."

=== 1861 ===
Following the massacre of thousands of Christian civilians during the 1860 civil conflict in Mount Lebanon and Damascus, and under growing European pressure, mainly from France, an Ottoman edict issued in 1861 transformed the "Double Kaymakamate", the former regime based on religious rule that led to civil war, into the Mount Lebanon Mutasarrifate, governed by a mutasarrıf who, according to law, had to be a non-Lebanese Christian.

=== 1864 ===
As part of the Tanzimat reforms, an Ottoman law passed in 1864 provided for a standard provincial administration throughout the empire with the eyalets becoming smaller vilayets, governed by a vali (governor) still appointed by the Sublime Porte but with new provincial assemblies participating in administration.

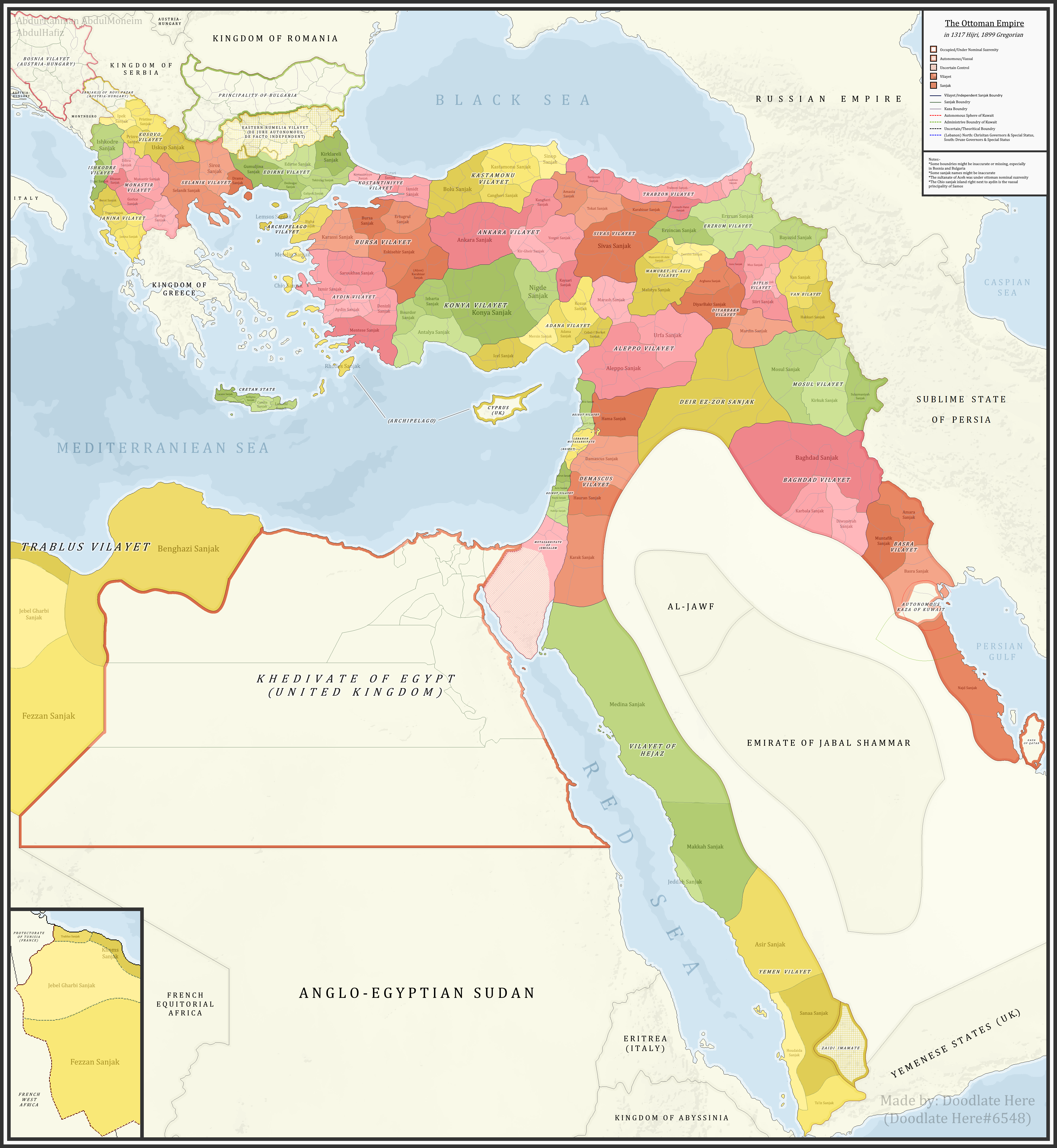
A map showing the administrative divisions of the Ottoman Empire in 1317 Hijri, 1899 Gregorian, Including Ottoman Syria.

=== 1872–1918 ===
In 1872 Jerusalem and the surrounding towns became the Mutasarrifate of Jerusalem, gaining a special administrative status.

From 1872 until World War I subdivisions of Ottoman Syria were:

- Aleppo Vilayet (Arabic: ولاية حلب)
- Sanjak of Zor (Arabic: سنجق دير الزور)
- Beirut Vilayet (Arabic: ولاية بيروت)
- Syria Vilayet (Arabic: ولاية سورية)
- Mutasarrifate of Mount Lebanon (Arabic: متصرفية جبل لبنان)
- Mutasarrifate of Jerusalem (Arabic: متصرفية القدس الشريف)
- Mutasarrifate of Karak (from 1895) (Arabic: متصرفية الكرك)

The sanjak Zor and the major part of the vilayet Aleppo may or may not be included in Ottoman Syria. The Geographical Dictionary of the World, published in 1906, describes Syria as:

"a country in the [south-west] part of Asia, forming part of the Turkish Empire. It extends eastward from the Mediterranean Sea to the river Euphrates and the Syrian Desert (the prolongation northward of the Arabian Desert), and southward from the Alma-Dagh (ancient Amanus), one of the ranges of the Taurus, to the frontiers of Egypt (Isthmus of Suez) It lies between the parallels of 31° and 37° [north latitude]. It comprises the vilayet of Syria (Suria), or of Damascus, the vilayet of Beirut, the [south-west] part of the vilayet of Aleppo, and the mutessarrifliks of Jerusalem and the Lebanon.

Palestine is included in [the country] Syria, comprising the mutessarriflik of Jerusalem and part of the vilayets of Beirut and Syria.

The designation Syria is sometimes used in wider sense so as to include the whole of the vilayet of Aleppo and the Zor Sanjak, a large part of Mesopotamia being thus added."

About Syria in 1915, a British report says:

"The term Syria in those days was generally used to denote the whole of geographical and historic Syria, that is to say the whole of the country lying between the Taurus Mountains and the Sinai Peninsula, which was made up of part of the Vilayet of Aleppo, the Vilayet of Bairut, the Vilayet of Syria, the Sanjaq of the Lebanon, and the Sanjaq of Jerusalem. It included that part of the country which was afterwards detached from it to form the mandated territory of Palestine."

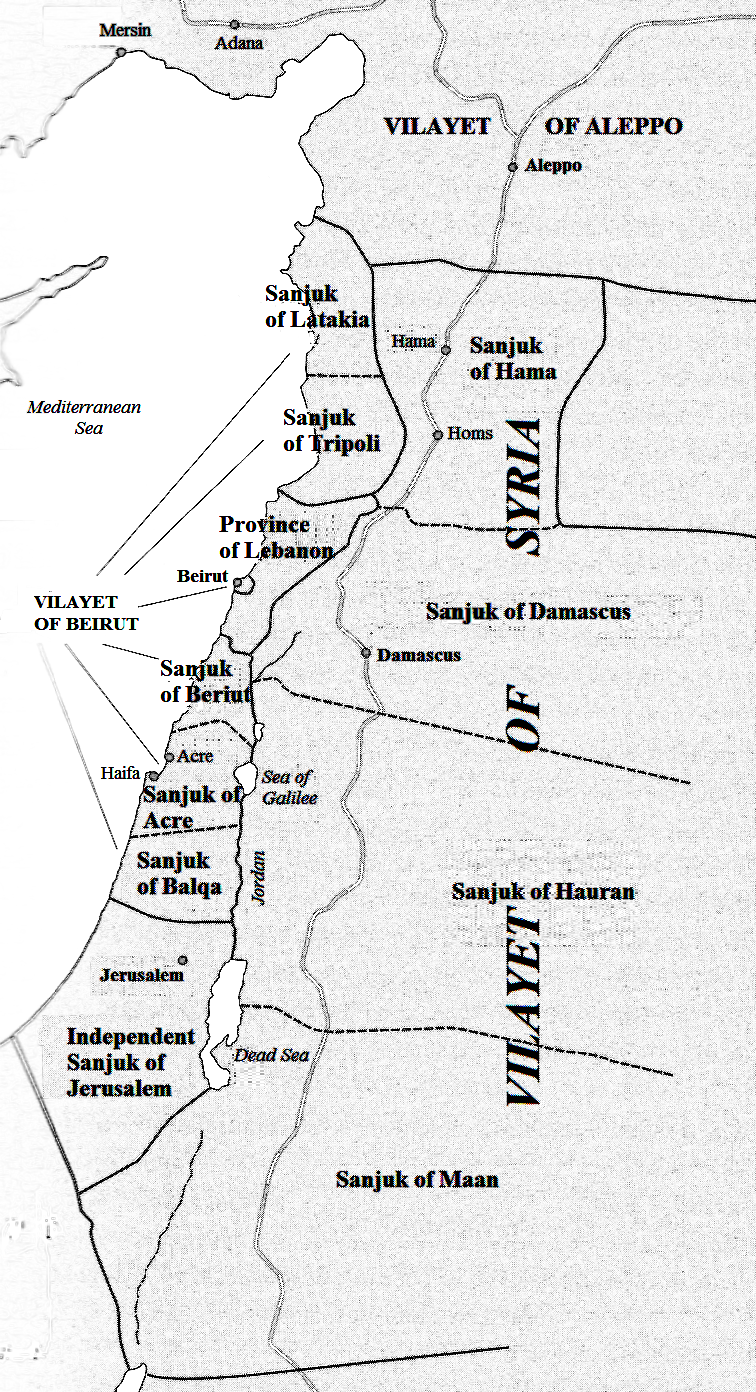
"Independent" Sanjak of Jerusalem shown within Ottoman administrative divisions in the Eastern Mediterranean coast after the reorganisation of 1887–88

Ottoman Syria until World War I. Present borders in grey.

== Contemporary maps, showing Eyalets (pre-Tanzimat reforms) ==
Maps of Contemporary Ottoman Syria showing Eyalets (pre 1864 Vilayet Law)
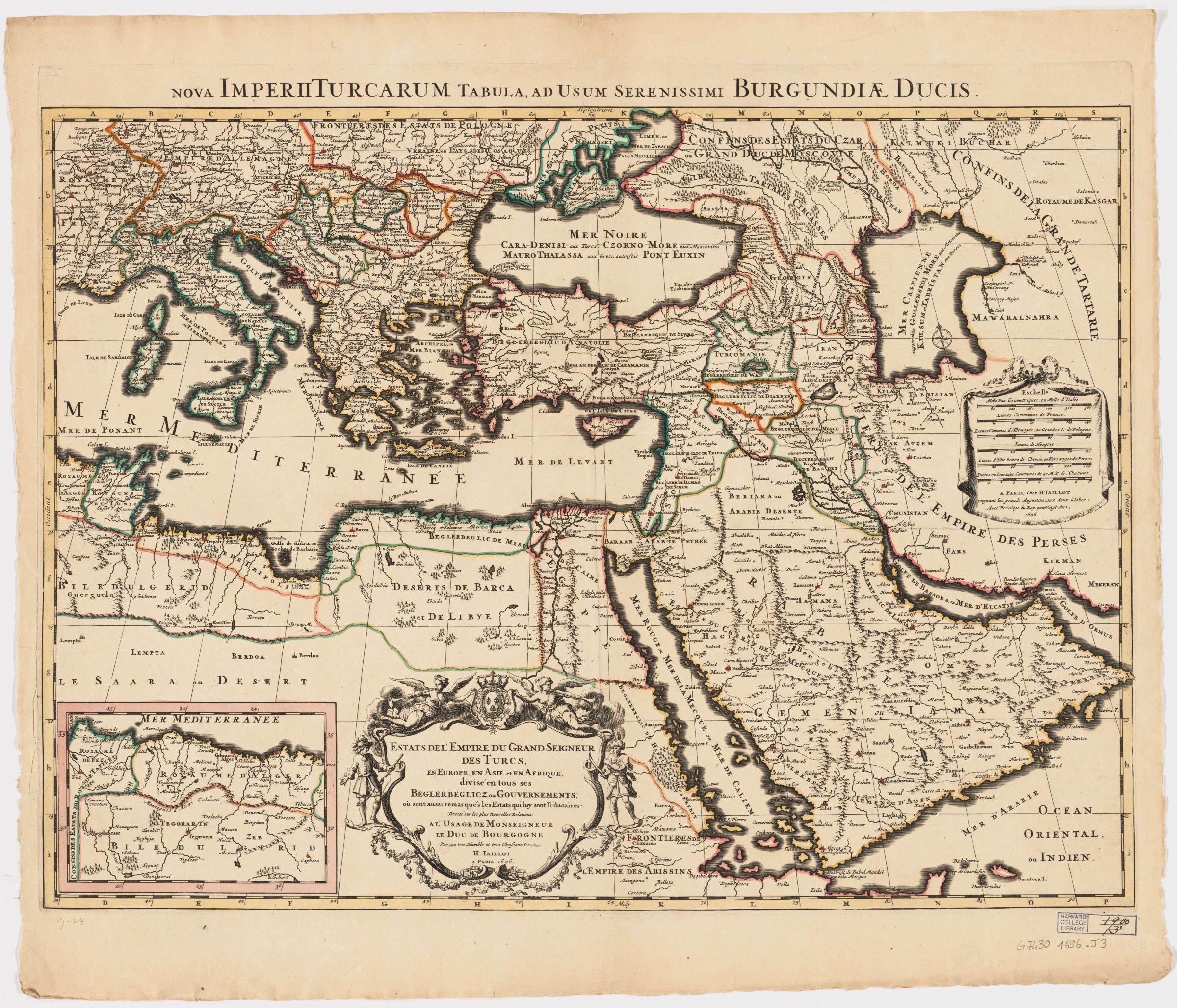
1696 (Jaillot), showing Eyalets

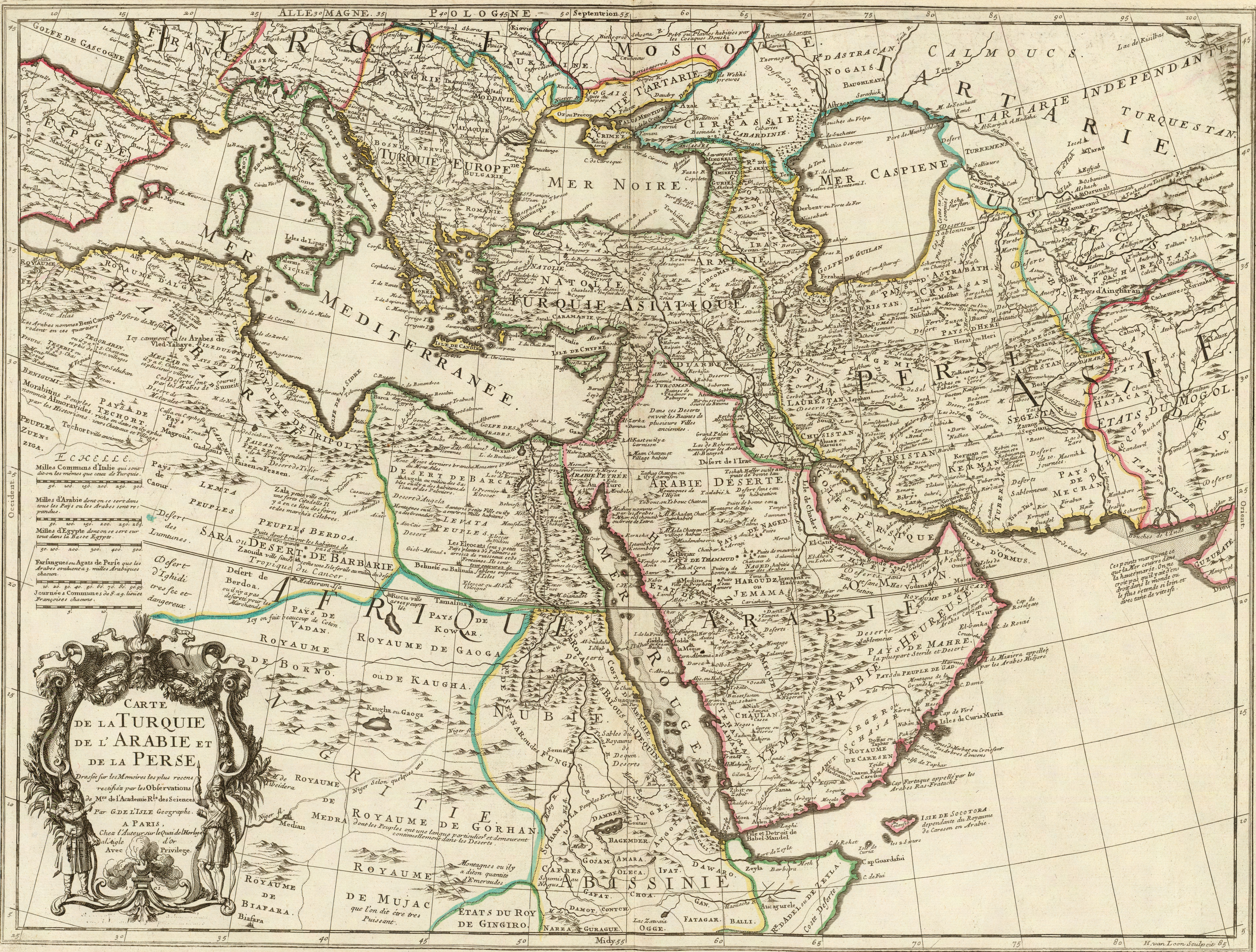
1707

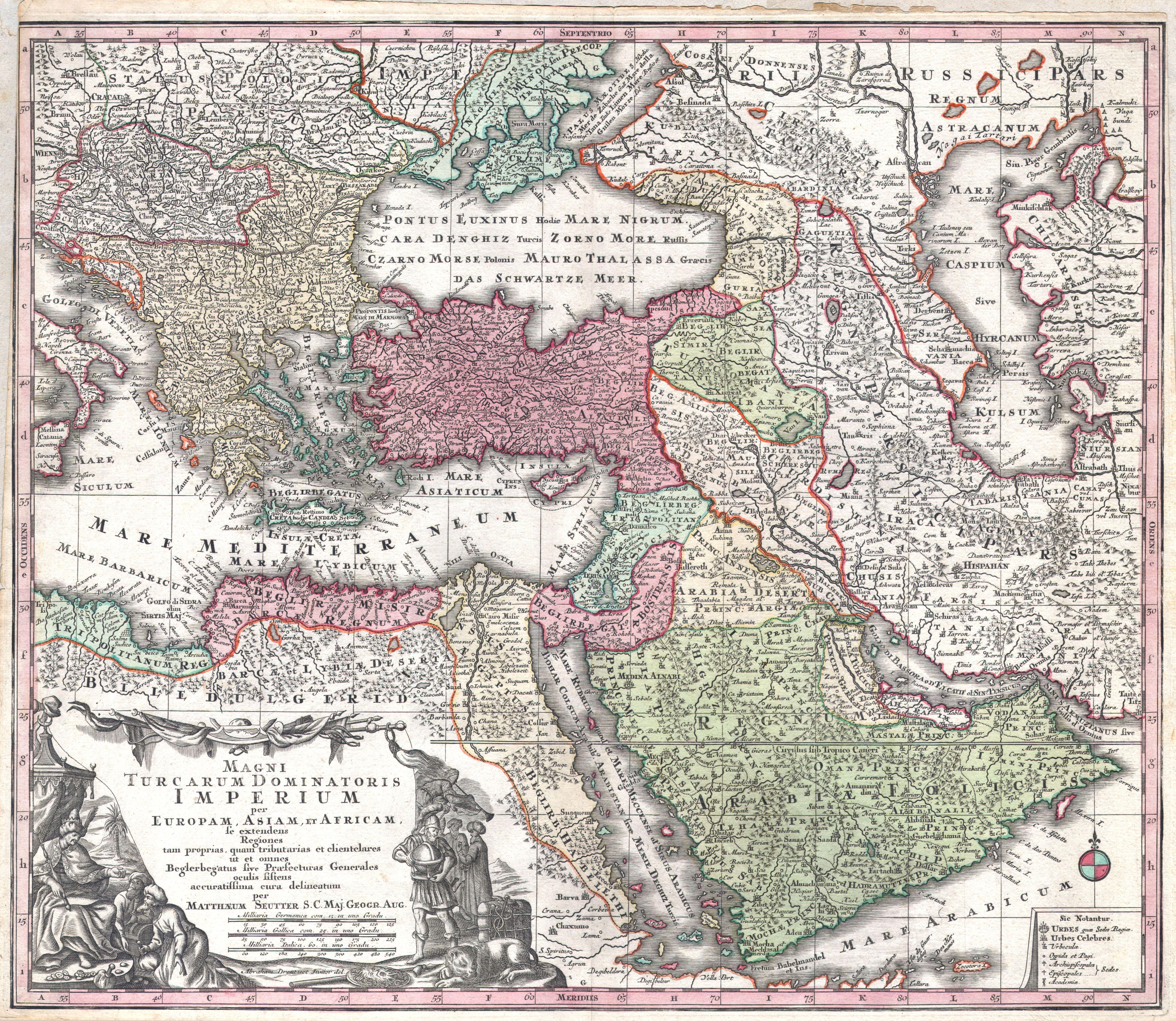
1740 (Seutter), showing Eyalets

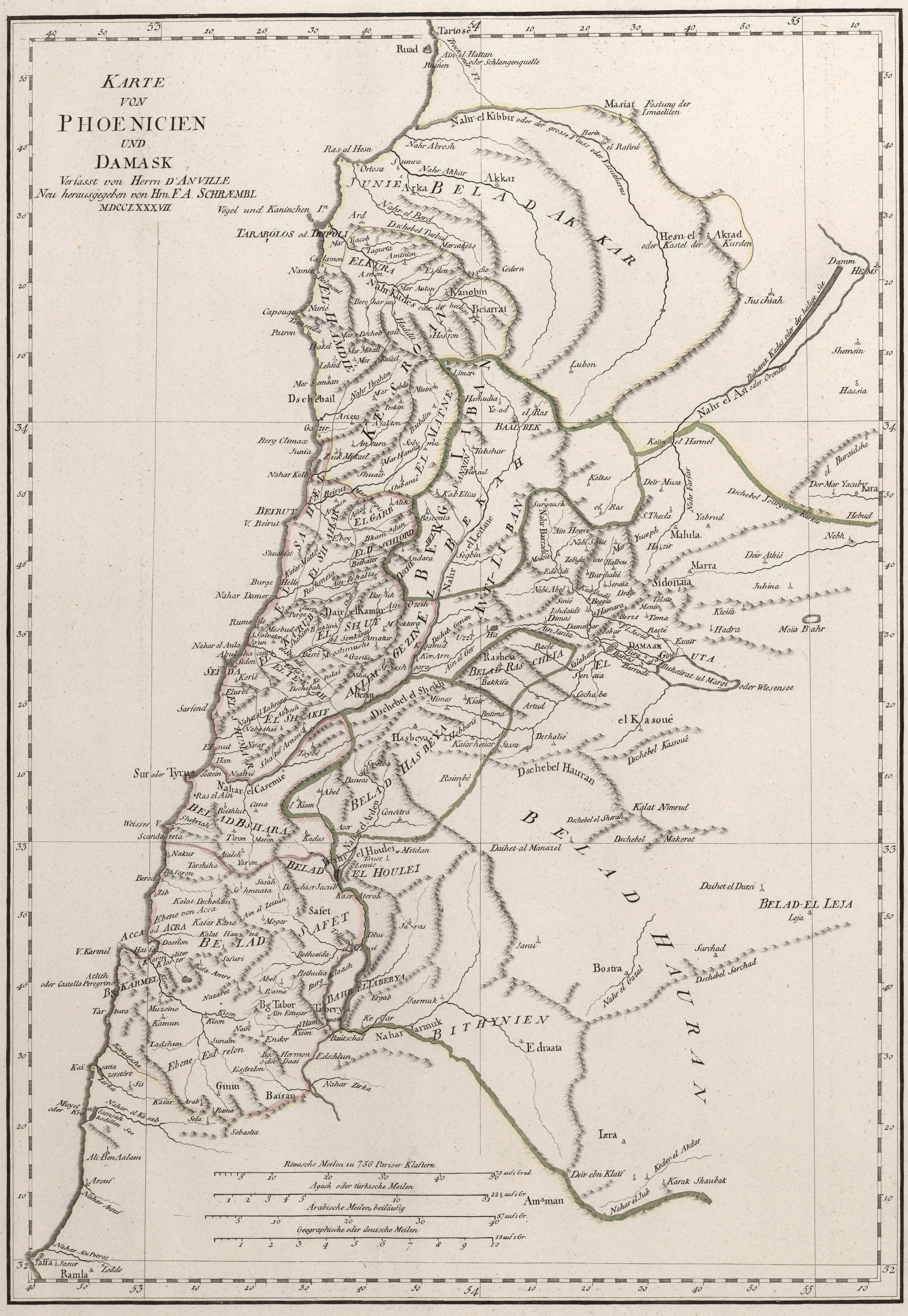
1787 map

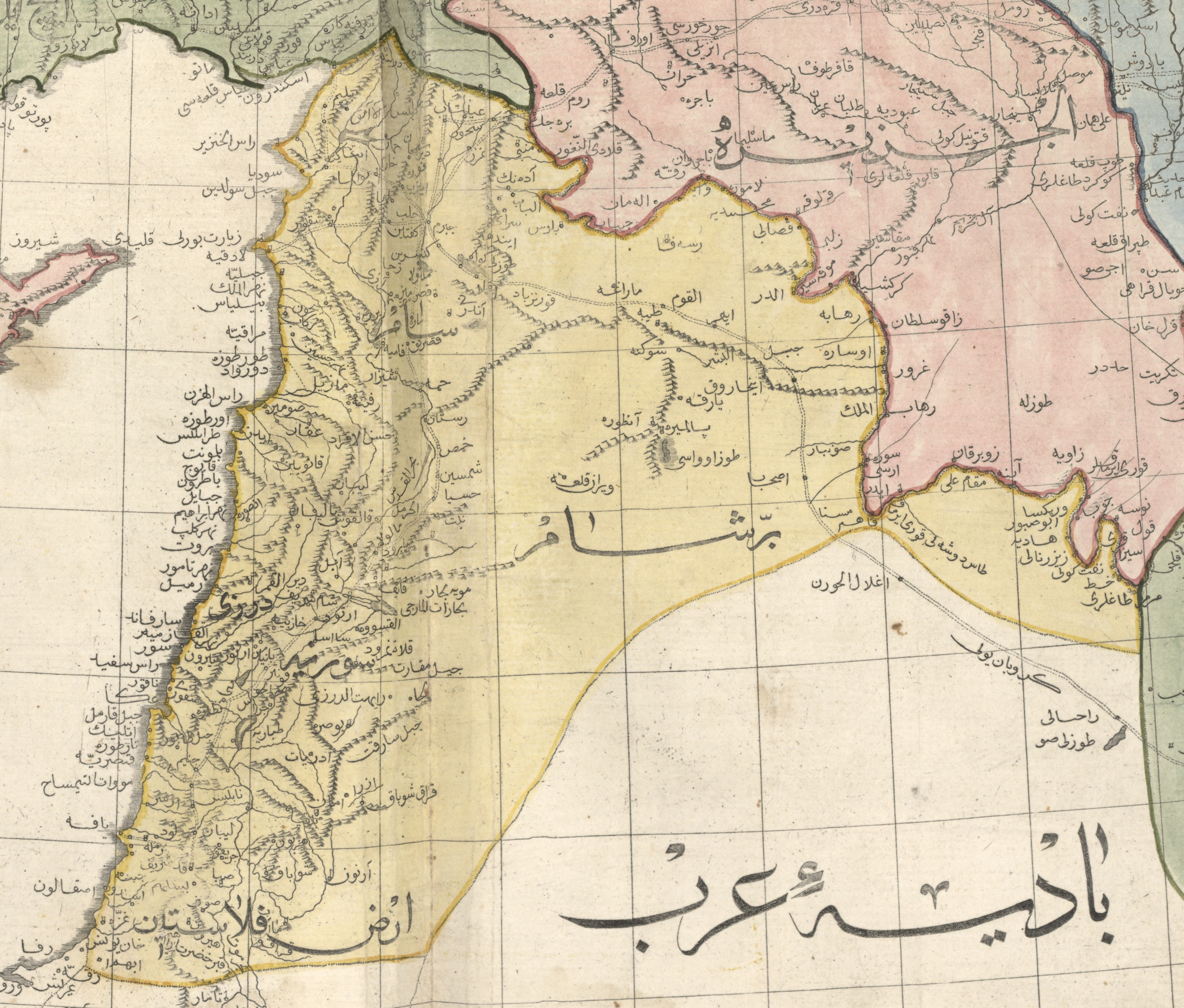
1803, from Cedid Atlas

1835 map by Heinrich Berghaus

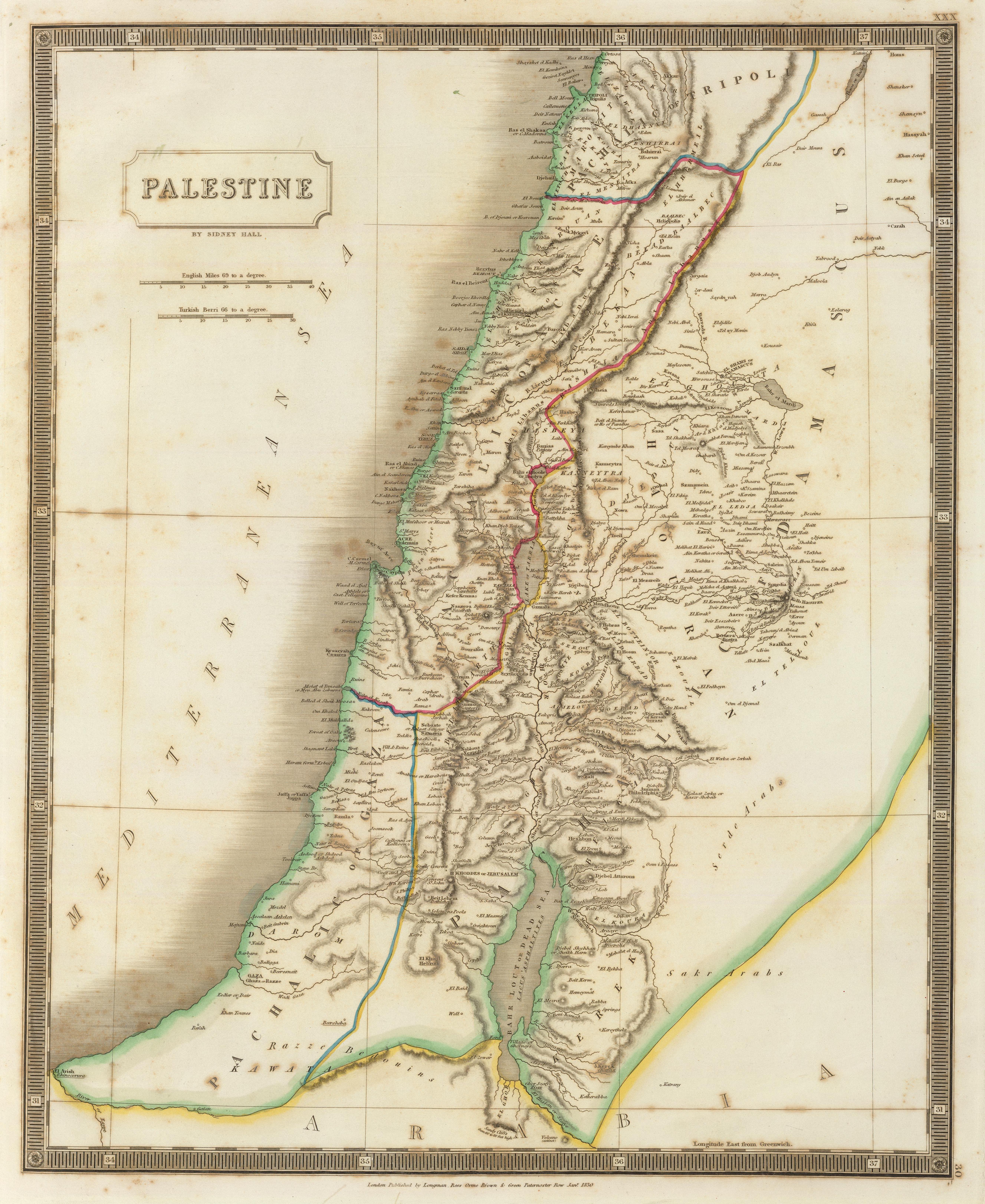
1830 map by Sidney Hall

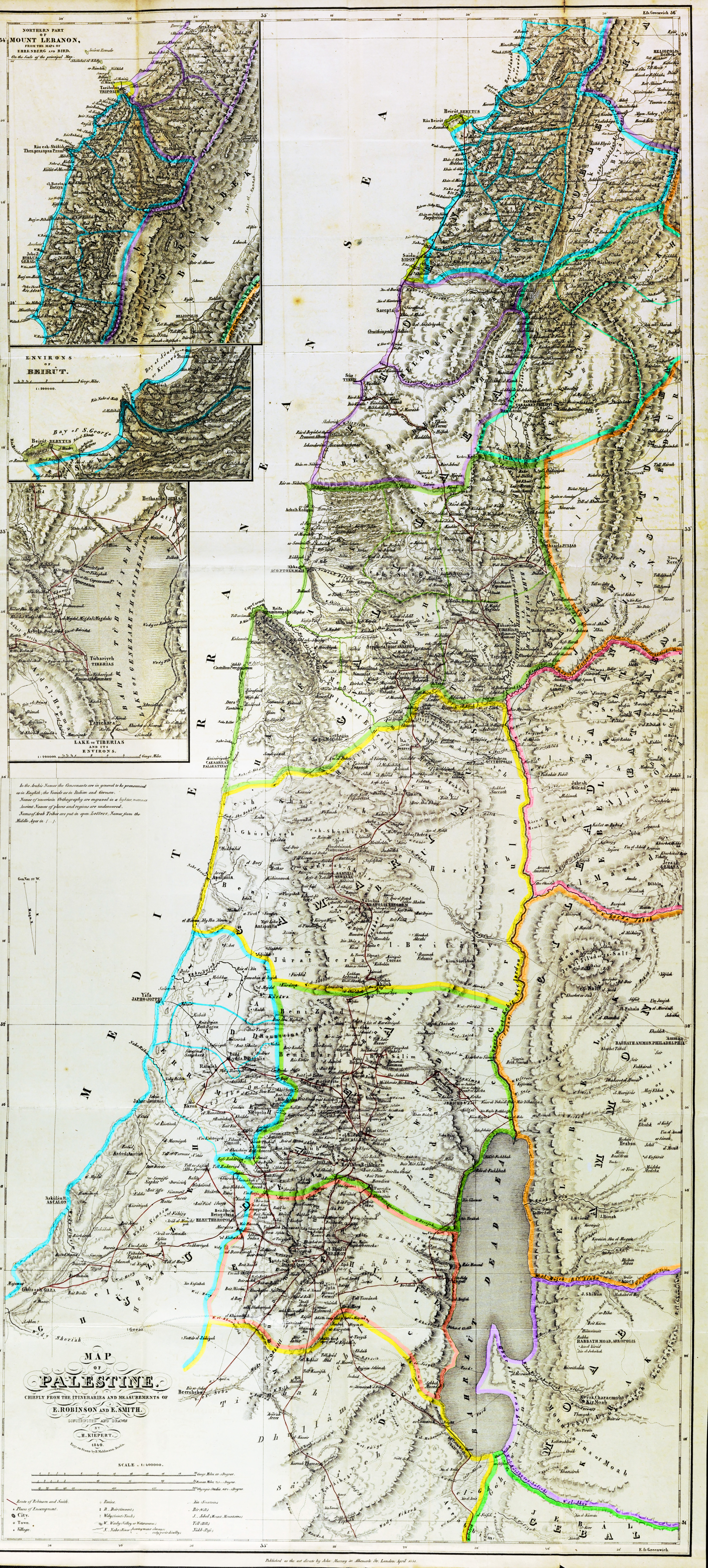
1841 Kiepert map of Palestine showing Ottoman subdivisions

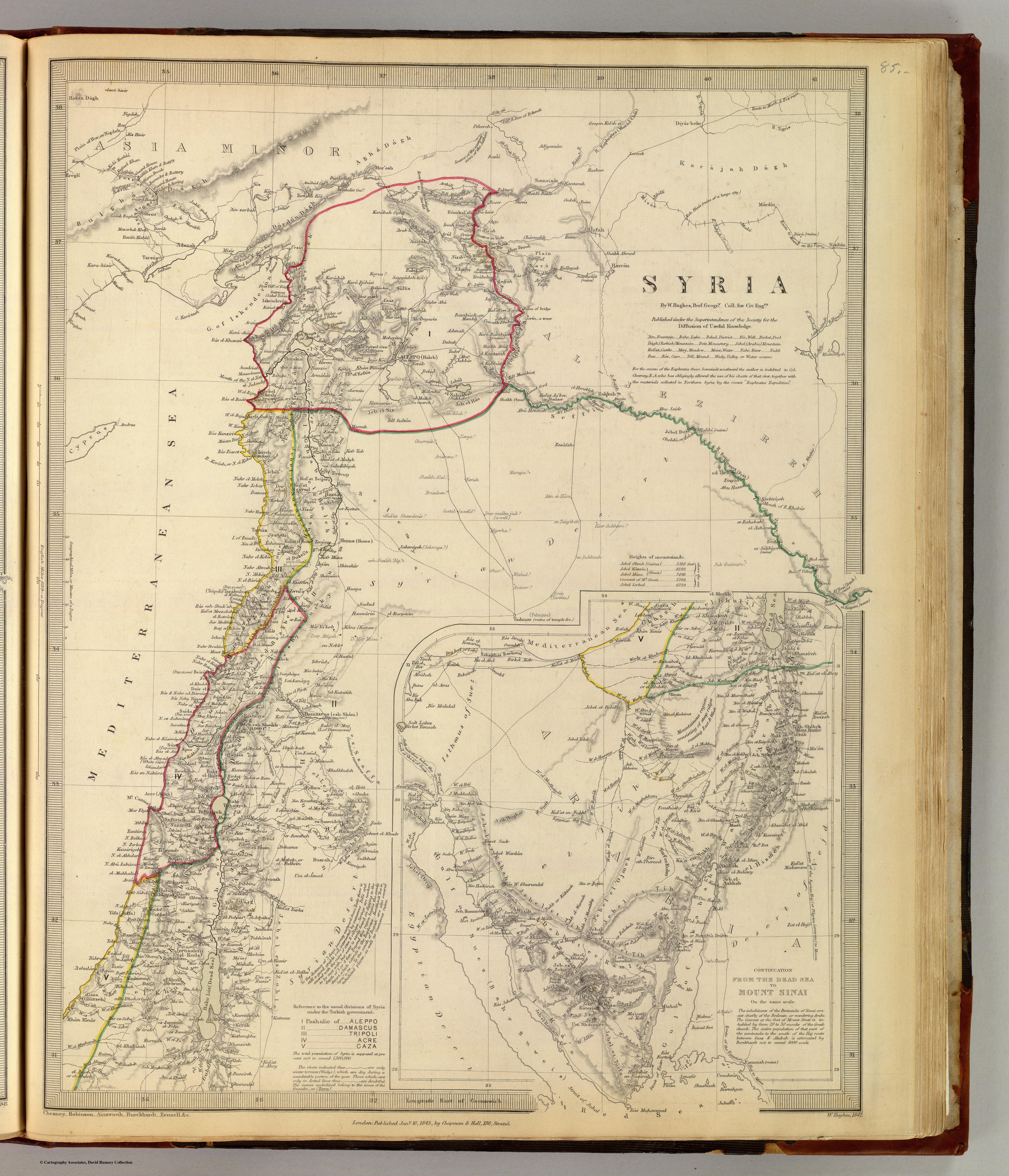
1842, showing "Pashalics"

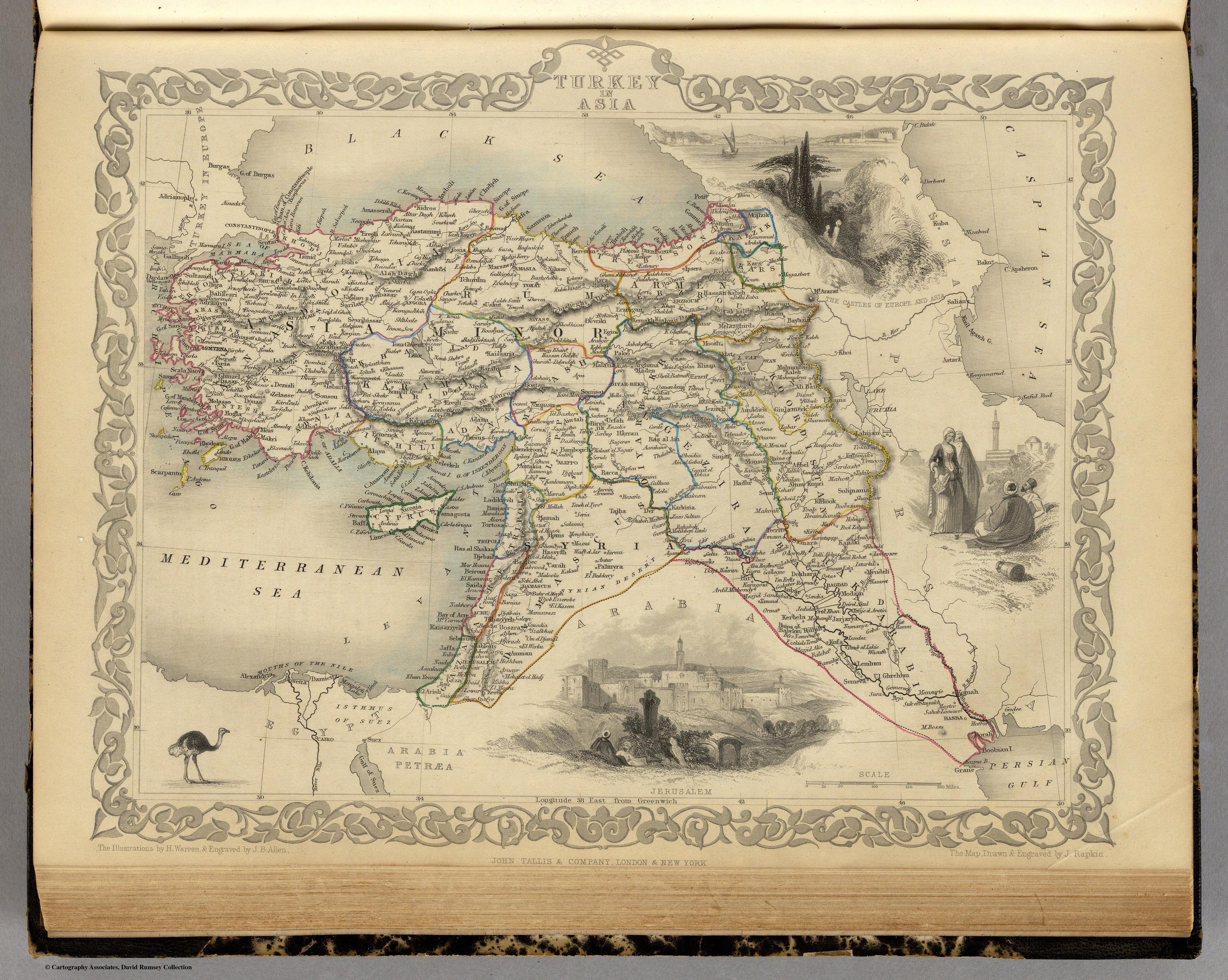
1851

== Contemporary maps, showing Vilayets (post-Tanzimat reforms) ==
Maps of Contemporary Ottoman Syria showing Vilayets (post-Tanzimat reforms)
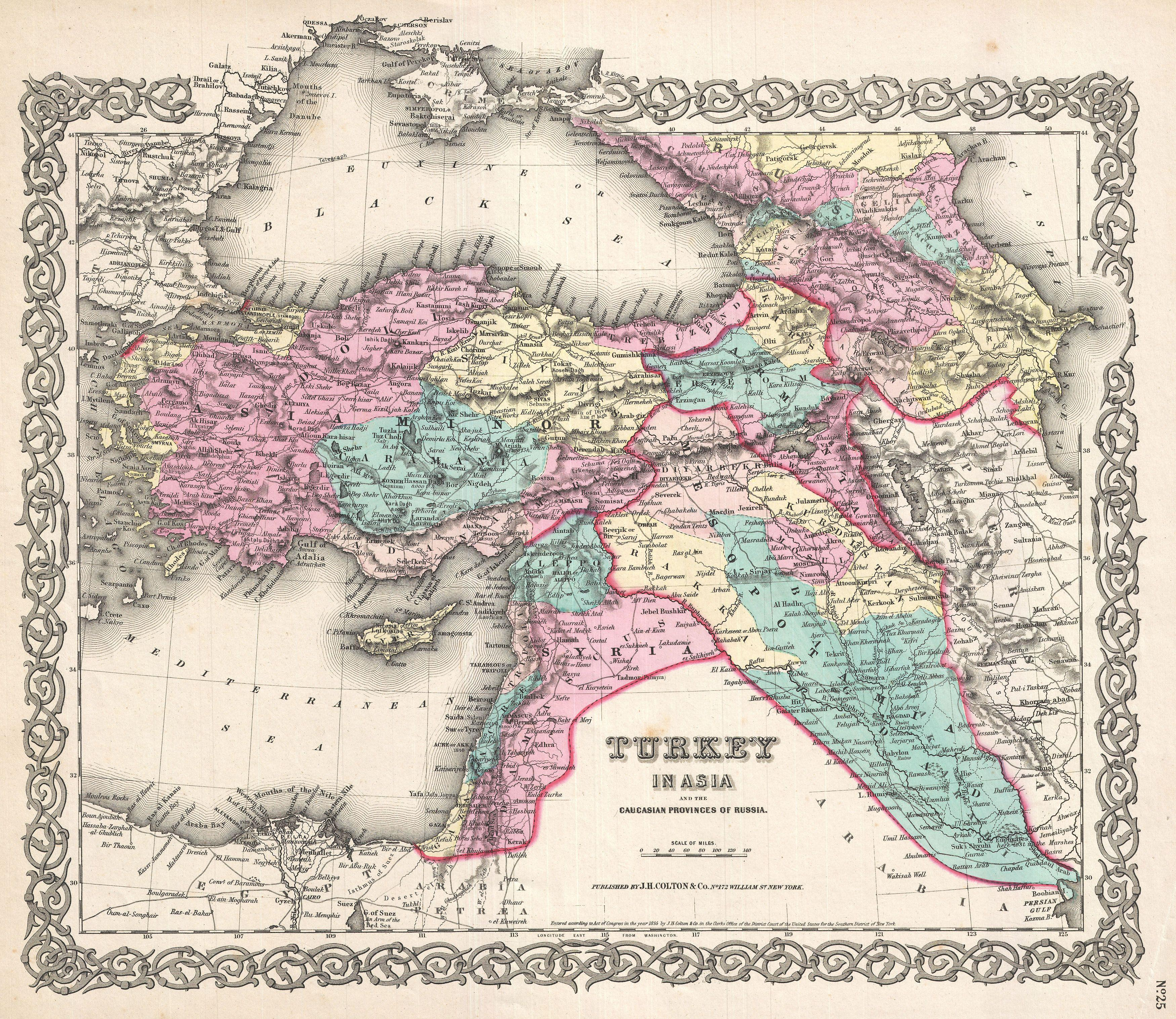
1855, showing sanjaks

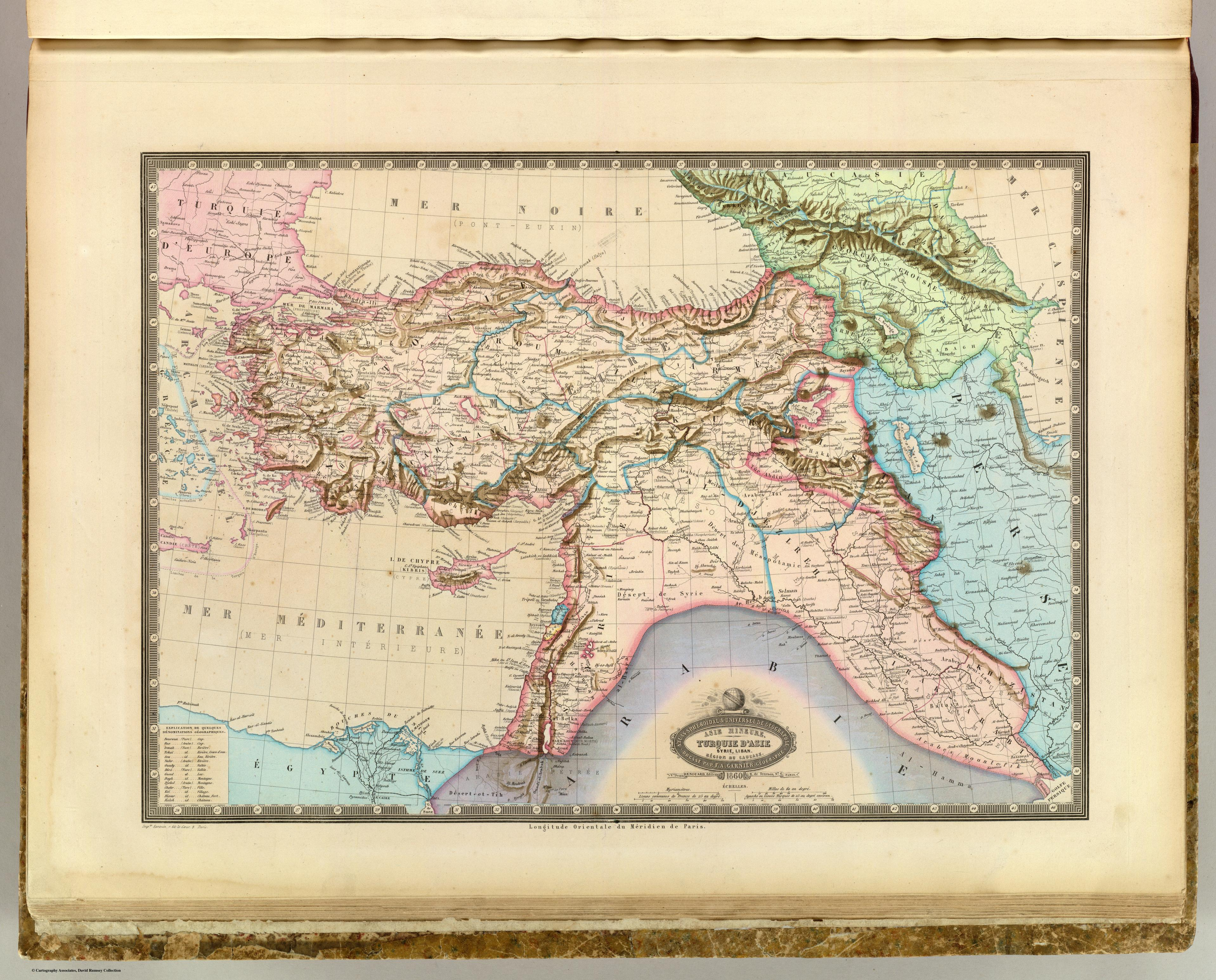
1862

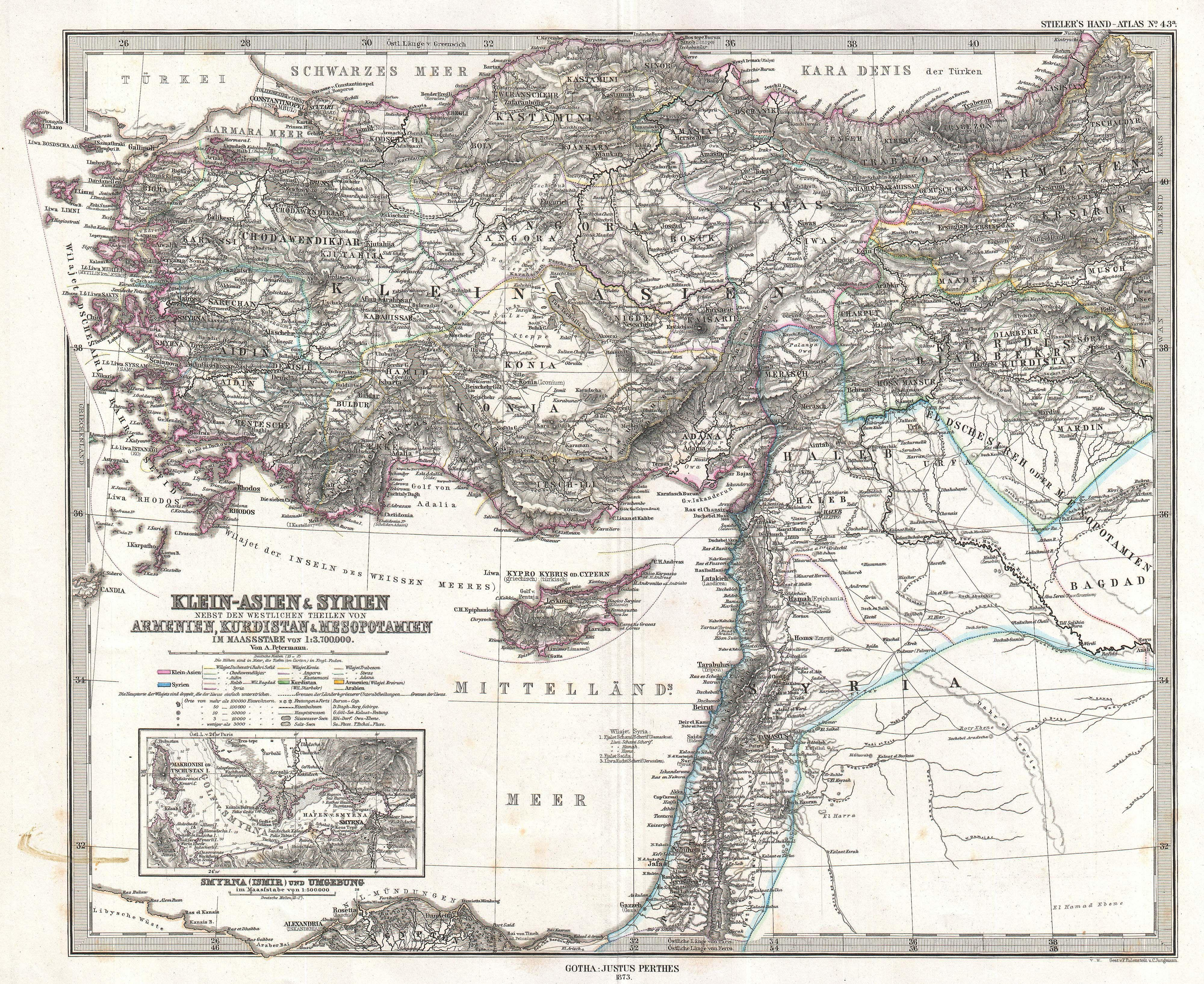
1873

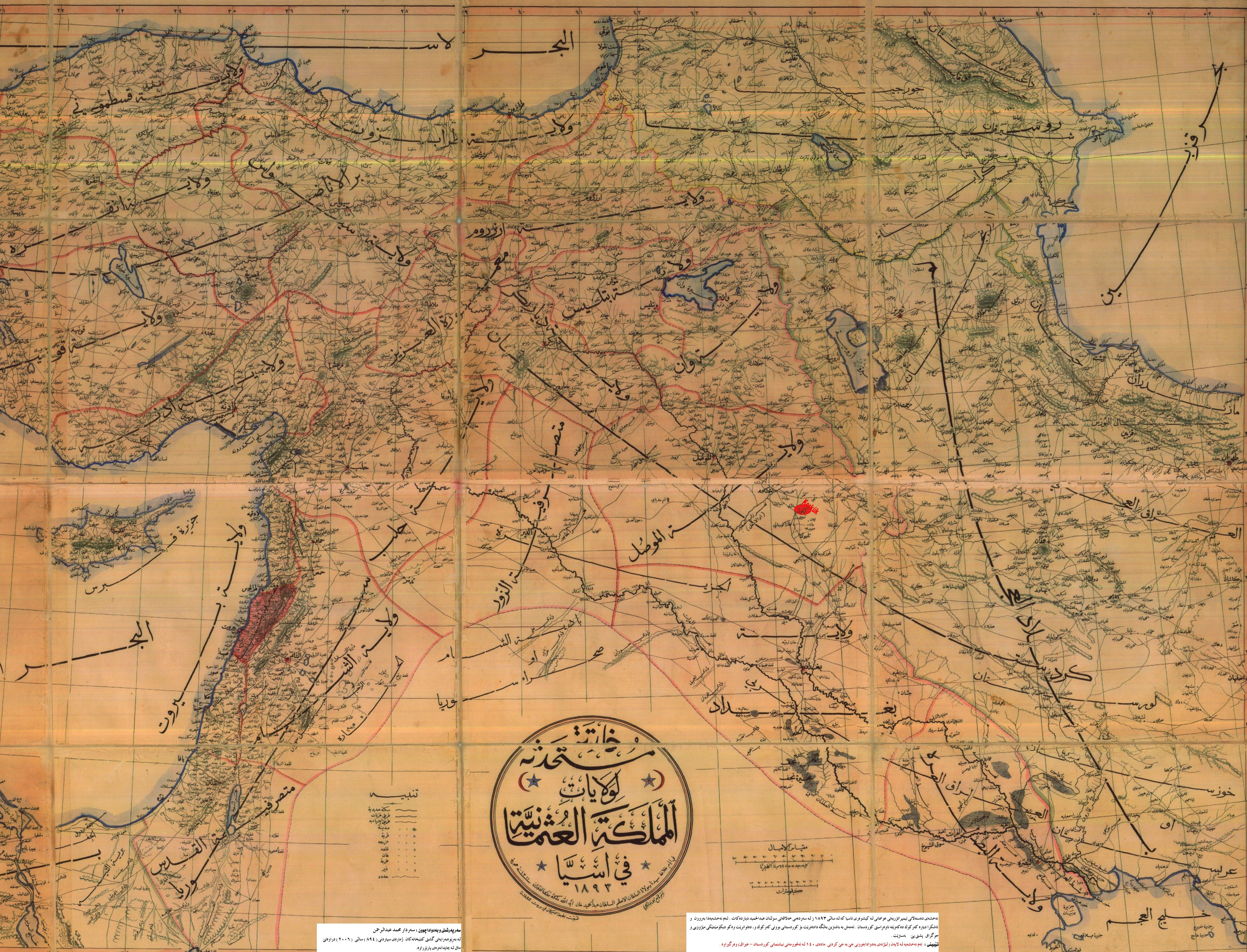
1893

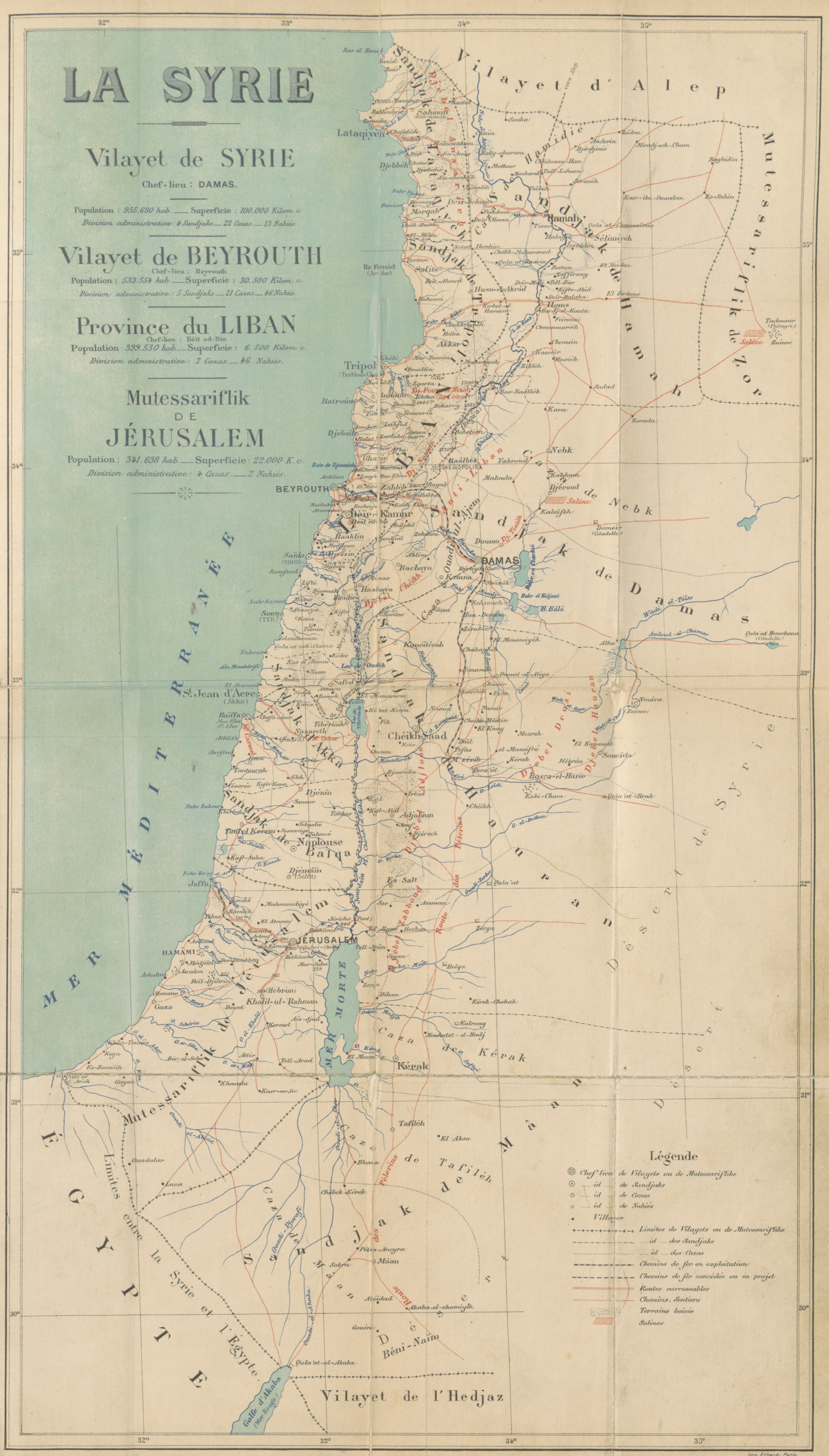
1896

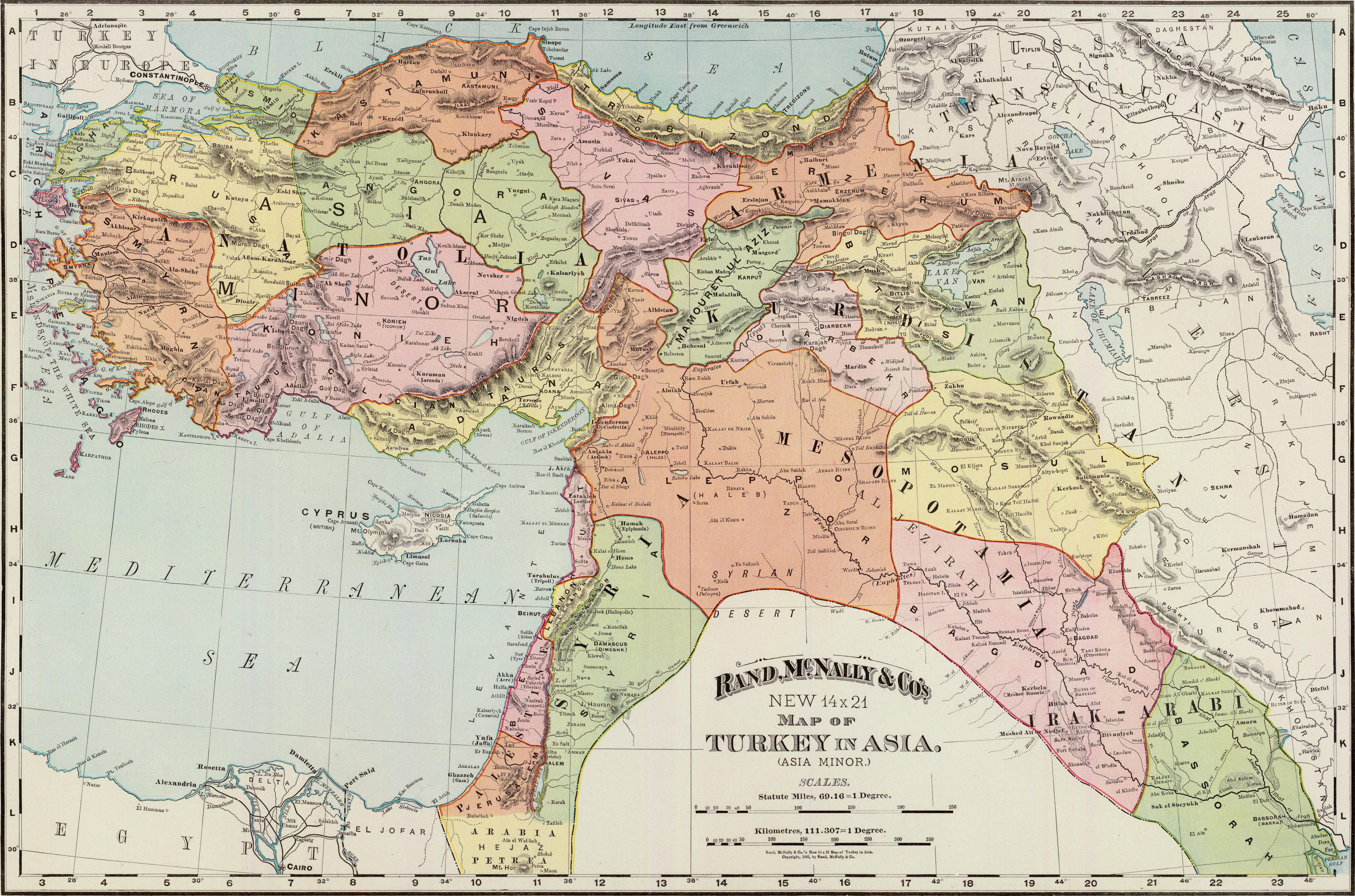
1897

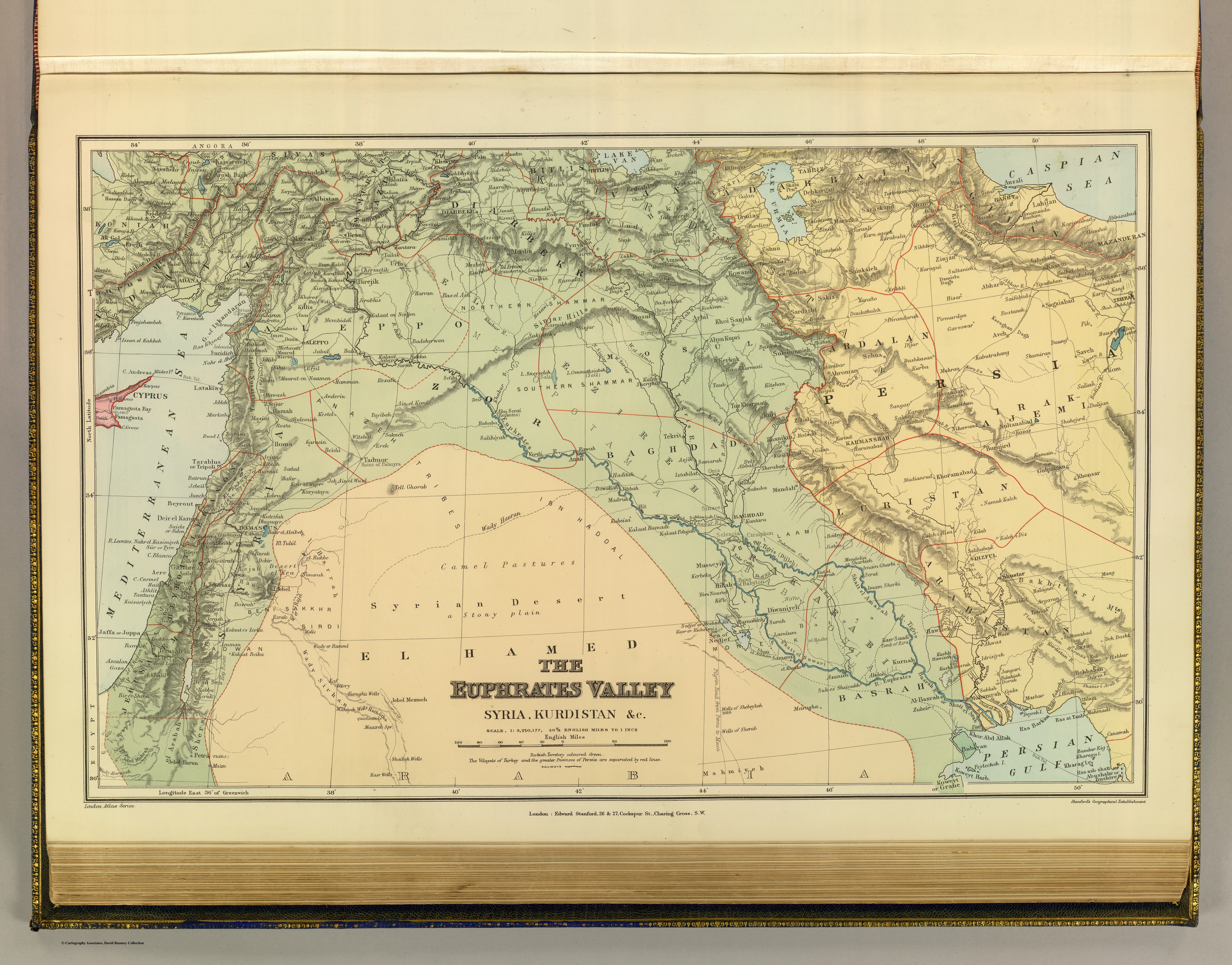
1900 (Stanford), showing Vilayets

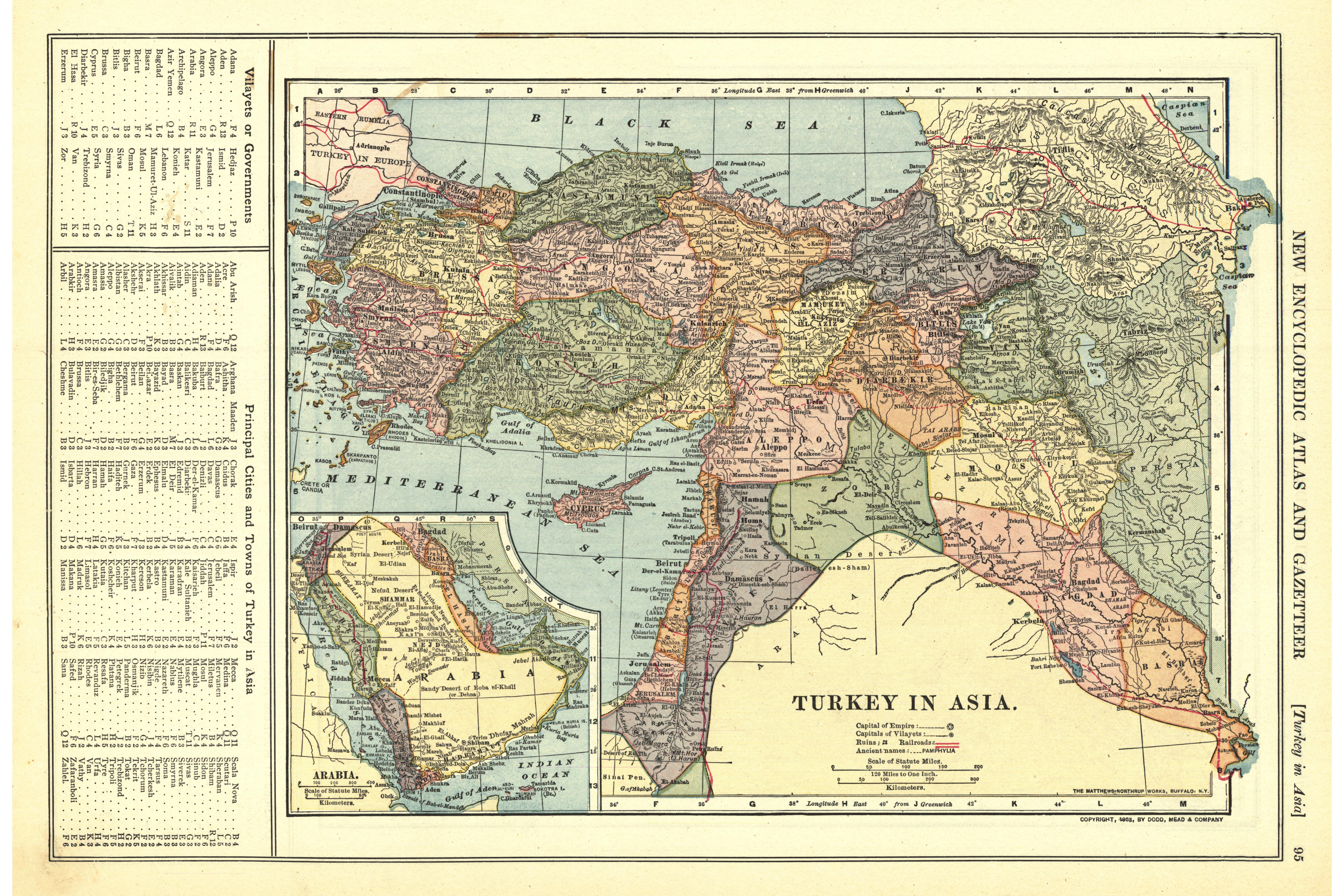
1909

1911

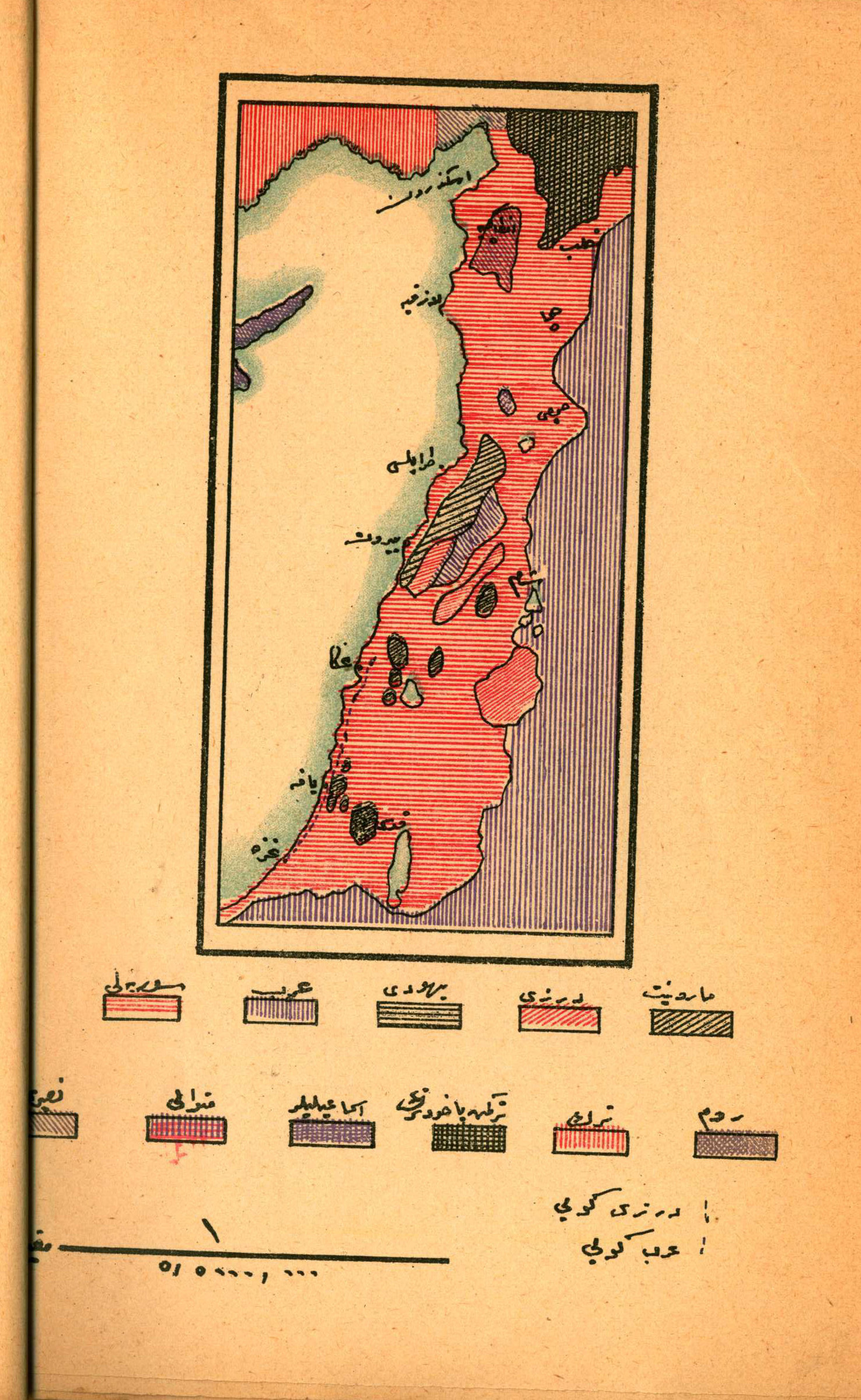
1915 ethnographic map

1918, the last official Ottoman map of Palestine

== See also ==
- Arab Kingdom of Syria
- Bilad al-Sham
- French Mandate for Syria and the Lebanon
- History of Syria
- Occupied Enemy Territory Administration
- Ottoman Palestine
- Southern Syria
- Sykes–Picot Agreement
- Syria (Roman province)

== Sources ==
- Bayyat, Fadil, The Ottoman State in the Arab Scope (in Arabic; 2007)
- Johann Ludwig Burckhardt, Travels in Syria and the Holy Land, Appendix II: On the Political Divisions of Syria
