= Aleppo vilayet =

First-level administrative division of the Ottoman Empire

Vilayet of Aleppo ولاية حلب Vilâyet-i Haleb
- Vilayet of Ottoman Empire
- 1866–1918
- Flag

- The Aleppo Vilayet in 1900
- Capital: Aleppo
- Area
  - Coordinates: 36.46°N 37.09°E
- Population
  - Muslim, 1914: 576,320
  - Greek, 1914: 21,954
  - Armenian, 1914: 40,843
- History
  - Vilayet Law: 1866
  - Disestablished: 1918
Preceded by
Adana Eyalet
Aleppo Eyalet
Dulkadir Eyalet
Succeeded by
Occupied Enemy Territory Administration
- Today part of: Syria; Turkey

The Vilayet of Aleppo (Ottoman Turkish: ولايت حلب, romanized: Vilâyet-i Halep; Arabic: ولاية حلب, romanized: Wilāyat Ḥalab) was a first-level administrative division (vilayet) of the Ottoman Empire, centered on the city of Aleppo.

== History ==
The vilayet was established in March 1866. The new boundaries of Aleppo were stretched northward to include the largely Turkish-speaking cities of Maraş, Antep and Urfa giving the province a roughly equal number of Arabic- and Turkish-speakers, as well as a large Armenian-speaking minority.

Thanks to its strategic geographic location on the trade route between Anatolia and the east, Aleppo rose to high prominence in the Ottoman era, at one point being second only to Constantinople in the empire. However, the economy of Aleppo was badly hit by the opening of the Suez Canal in 1869, and since then Damascus rose as a serious competitor with Aleppo over the title of the capital of Syria.

Historically, Aleppo was more united in economy and culture with its sister Anatolian cities than with Damascus. This fact still shows today with the distinctive cultural differences between Aleppo and Damascus.

At the end of World War I, the Treaty of Sèvres made most of the Province of Aleppo part of the newly established nation of Syria, while Cilicia was promised by France to become an Armenian state. However, Mustafa Kemal Atatürk annexed most of the Province of Aleppo as well as Cilicia to Turkey in his War of Independence. The Arab residents in the province (as well as the Kurds) supported the Turks in this war against the French, a notable example being Ibrahim Hanano who directly coordinated with Atatürk and received weaponry from him. The outcome, however, was disastrous for Aleppo, because as per the Treaty of Lausanne, most of the Province of Aleppo was made part of Turkey with the exception of Aleppo and Alexandretta; thus, Aleppo was cut from its northern satellites and from the Anatolian cities beyond on which Aleppo depended heavily in commerce. Moreover, the Sykes-Picot division of the Near East separated Aleppo from most of Mesopotamia, which also harmed the economy of Aleppo. The situation exacerbated further in 1939 when Alexandretta was annexed to Turkey, thus depriving Aleppo from its main port of İskenderun and leaving it in total isolation within Syria.

== Demographics ==
At the beginning of the 20th century, it reportedly had an area of 30,304 square miles (78,490 km^{2}), while the preliminary results of the first Ottoman census of 1885 (published in 1908) reported a population of 1,500,000. The accuracy of the population figures ranges from "approximate" to "merely conjectural" depending on the region from which they were gathered.

The dominant language was Arabic, but Turkish was spoken among the villagers of Kilis and Aintab, and Kurdish around Urfa. Ethnic groups in the vilayet included Arabs, Turks, Circassians, Kurds, Turkomans, Ansaris, Yezidis, Druze, Armenians, Syriacs, Maronites, Jews, and some Germanic-speaking Europeans.

== Administrative divisions ==
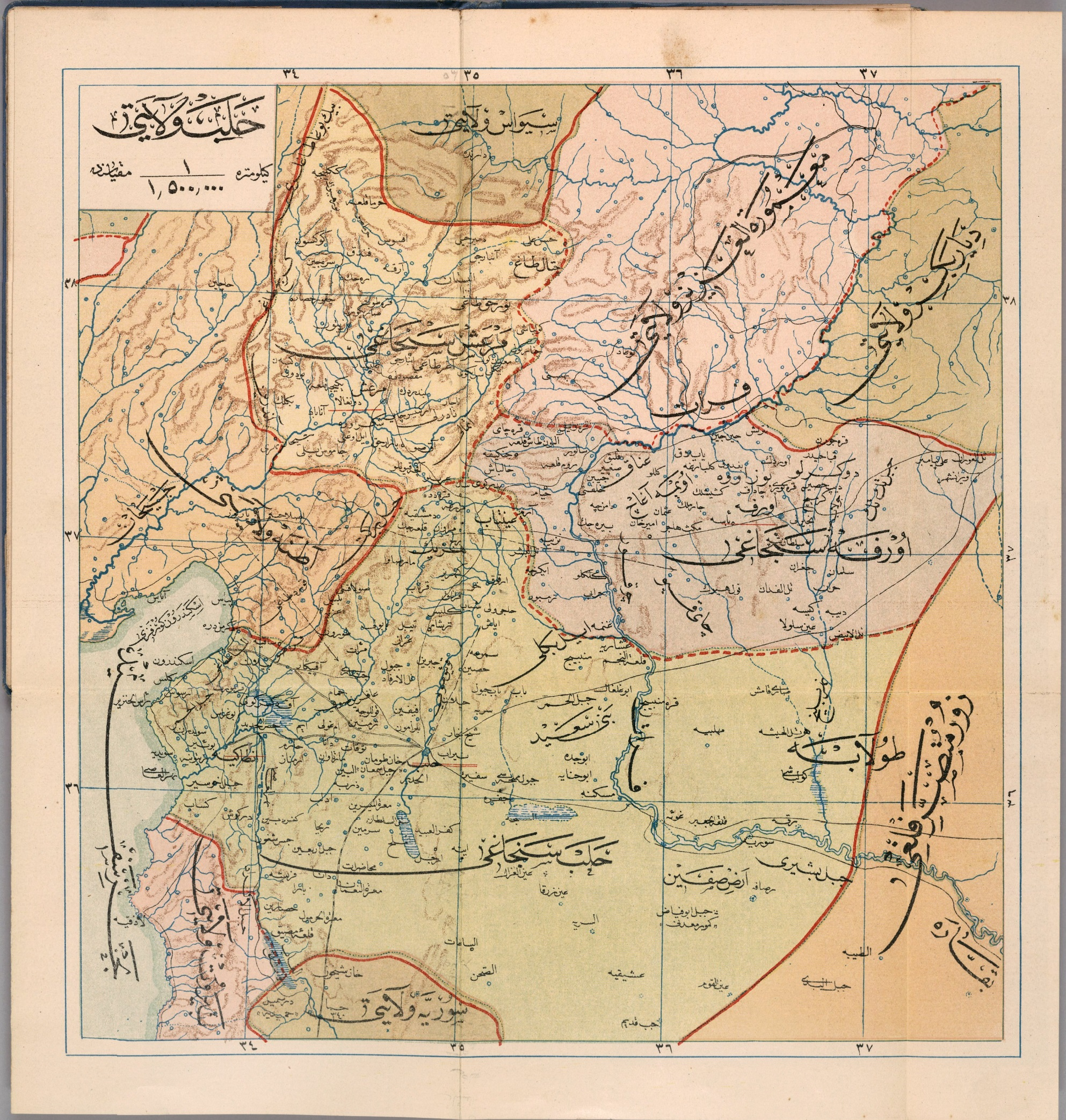
Map of subdivisions of Aleppo Vilayet in 1907

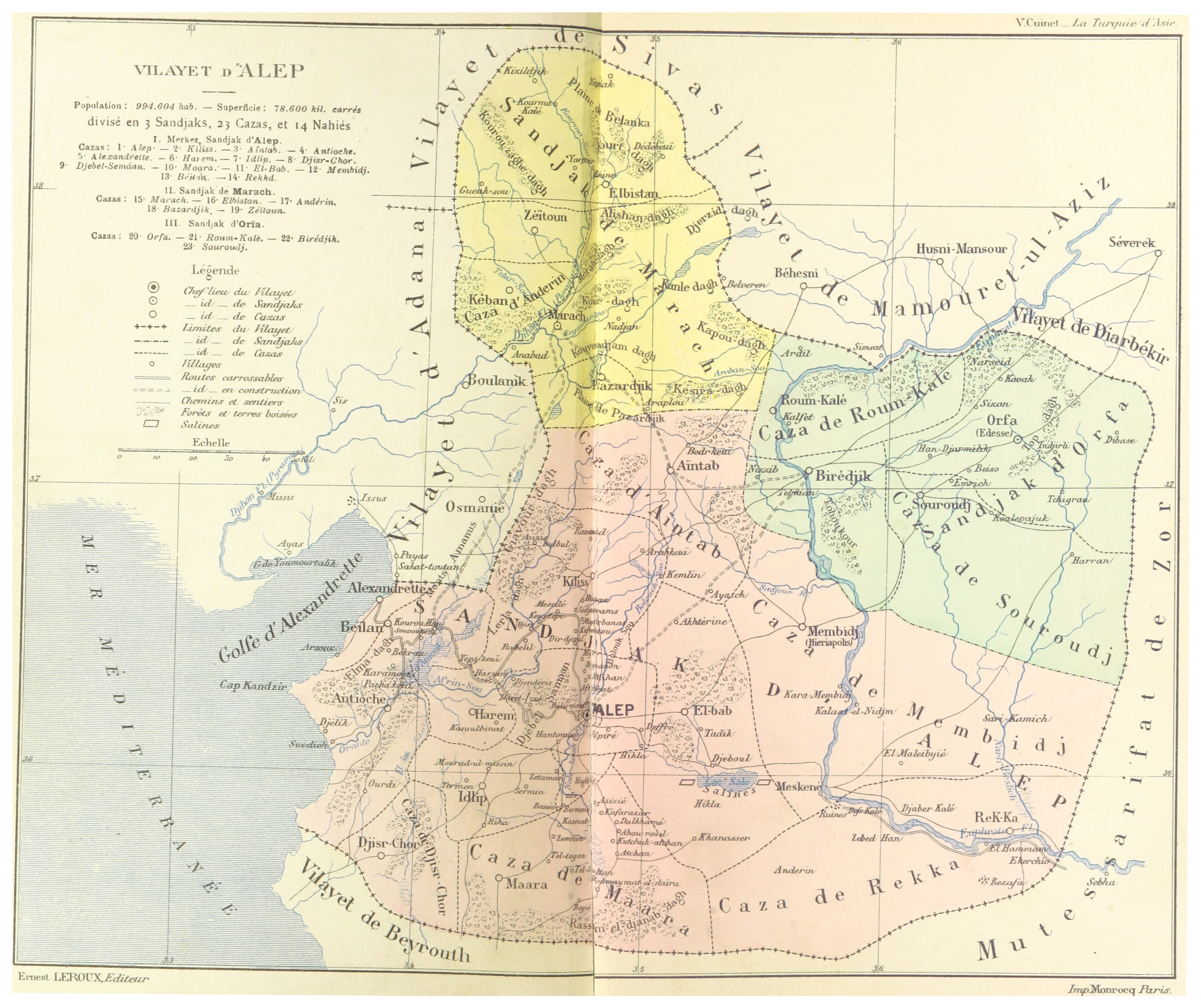
Divisions of the Vilayet

Sanjaks of the vilayet, circa 1876

1. Aleppo Sanjak (In 1908 the kaza of Ayıntab was joined with the kaza of Pazarcık from the Marash Sanjak and became a sanjak) (Aleppo, İskenderun, Antakya, Belen, Idlib, Al-Bab, Jisr al-Shughur)
2. Aintab Sanjak (Gaziantep, Kilis, Rumkale)
3. Cebelisemaan Sanjak (Mount Simeon, Maarrat al-Nu'man, Manbij)
4. Marash Sanjak (Kahramanmaraş, Pazarcık, Elbistan, Süleymanlı, Göksun)
5. Urfa Sanjak (Şanlıurfa, Birecik, Nizip, Suruç, Harran, Raqqa)
6. Zor Sanjak (later became an independent sanjak) (Deir ez-Zor, Ras al-Ayn)

== See also ==
- Ottoman Syria
