= Dulkadir Eyalet =

Administrative division of the Ottoman Empire from c. 1527 to 1864

Maraş Eyaleti
- Eyalet of Ottoman Empire
- c. 1527–1864
- Flag

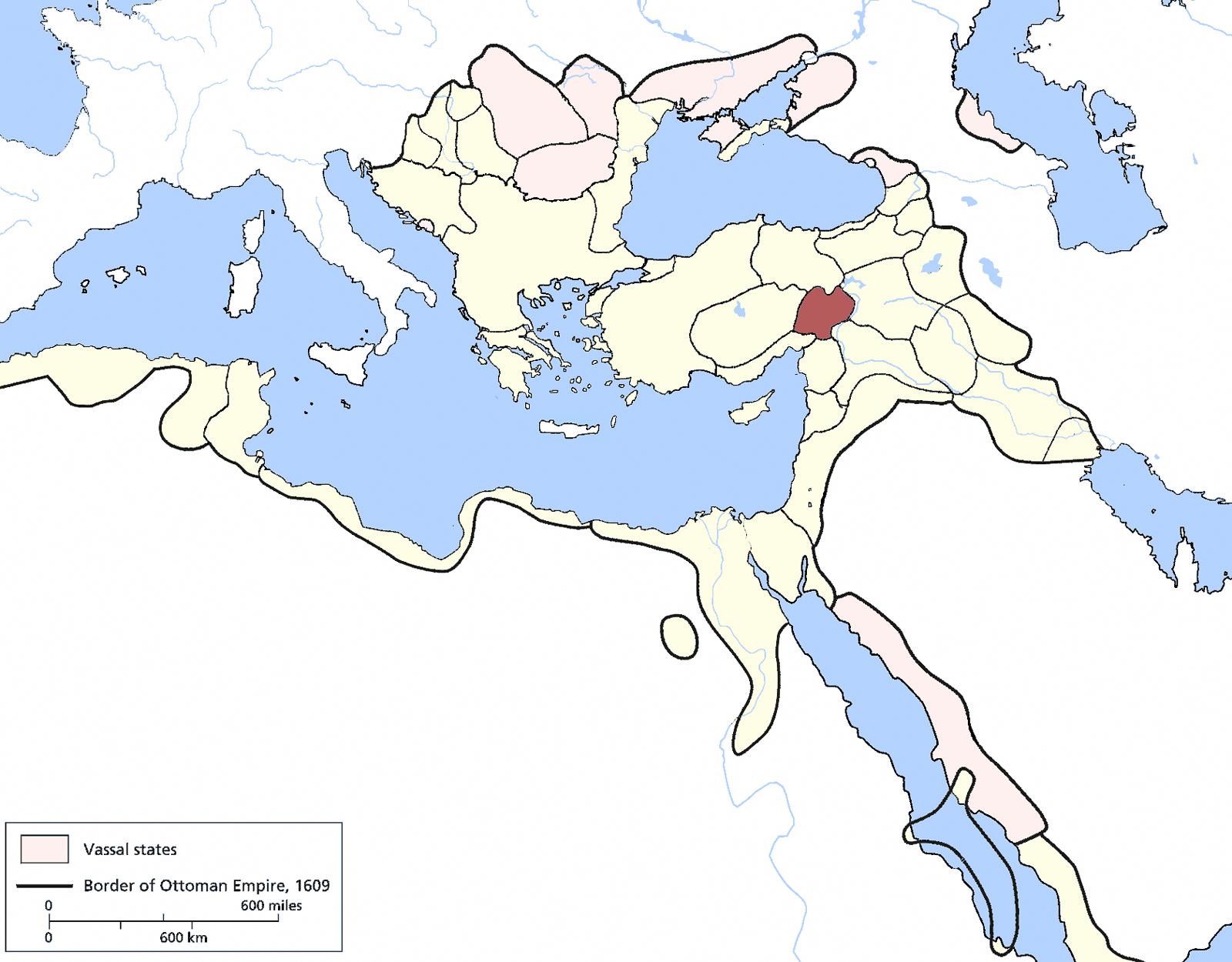
- The Dulkadir Eyalet in 1609
- Capital: Marash
- History
  - Established: c. 1527
  - Disestablished: 1864
Preceded by	Succeeded by
Dulkadirids	Aleppo Vilayet; Diyarbekir Vilayet

Dulkadir Eyalet (Ottoman Turkish: ایالت ذو القادریه / دولقادر, romanized: Eyālet-i Ẕū l-Ḳādirīye / Ḍūlḳādir) or Marash Eyalet (Turkish: Maraş Eyaleti) was an eyalet of the Ottoman Empire.

== History ==
The Dulkadirids were the last of the Anatolian emirates to yield to the Ottomans, managing to remain independent until 1521, and were not fully incorporated into the empire until 1530.

It is unclear when the eyalet was formed. Ottoman historian Ibn Kemal explained that the territory formerly ruled by Ali was divided into five sanjaks with governors appointed by the central government with no mention of the appointment of a beylerbey. The province was described as vilayet, a region instead of an eyalet, by the 1526 icmal defter. A record, thought to be from 1527, listed Marash as part of Karaman Eyalet, while Bozok belonged to Rum Eyalet. Dulkadir Eyalet was likely established shortly after the grand vizier Pargalı Ibrahim Pasha extinguished the Kalenderoghlu revolt the same year and took administrative precautions to maintain order in the realm. Historian Celalzade attests to the beylerbey of Dulkadir in Tabakātü'l-memâlik in 1538.

== Administrative divisions ==
Sanjaks	Former eyalet	Joined	Left	Later eyalet (or vilayet)	Note
Marash	Karaman	c. 1527	1850	Adana	Capital sanjak.
Aintab	Aleppo	c. 1531	1818	Aleppo	
Bozok	Rum	c. 1531	1574	Rum	Sporadically changed hands between Dulkadir and Rum Eyalet until its permanent transfer to the latter by 1574.
Uzayr	Damascus	1534	1553	Aleppo	
Tarsus	Aleppo	By 1538	By Dec. 1549	Karaman	
Tarsus	Karaman	By Jan. 1559	30 July 1571	Cyprus	
Sis		1538–1548	30 July 1571	Cyprus	
Malatya	Rum	1559	1559	Rum	
Malatya	Rum	1568	1839	Diyarbekir	
Kars		1568–1574	Before 1831		
Samsat		1568–1574	After 1831		
Gerger		1831			

== Demographics ==
In the early 16th century, a significant portion of the province's population was composed of nomadic Turkmens of the Dulkadir tribe. According to the 1526 icmal defter, the region consisted of 69,481 households (approximately 350,000 people), 48,665 (about 245,000 people), 18,158, and 2,631 of whom were Dulkadir nomads, settled Muslims, and Christians, respectively. The region included 523 villages, 3412 hamlets, 62 farms, 64 kishlaks (winter pastures), and 35 yaylaks (summer pastures).

The population of the eyalet increased in 1570–1580, when it housed 113,028 households (approximately 550,000 people), 70,368, 38,497, and 4163 of whom were settled Muslims, nomads, and Christians, respectively. Around those times, the province had 2169 sworded timars and 5500 levy. During the 17th century, it increased to 2869 sworded timar and 6800 levy.

== Bibliography ==
- Açıkel, Ali (2008). "Rum Eyaleti". TDV Encyclopedia of Islam, Vol. 35 (Resûlîler – Sak) (in Turkish). Istanbul: Turkiye Diyanet Foundation, Centre for Islamic Studies. pp. 225–226. ISBN 978-975-389-457-9.
- Bilgili, Ali Sinan (2011). "Tarsus". TDV Encyclopedia of Islam, Vol. 40 (Tanzi̇mat – Teveccüh) (in Turkish). Istanbul: Turkiye Diyanet Foundation, Centre for Islamic Studies. pp. 111–114. ISBN 978-975-389-652-8.
- Göğebakan, Göknur (2003). "Malatya". TDV Encyclopedia of Islam, Vol. 27 (Kütahya Mevlevîhânesi̇ – Mani̇sa) (in Turkish). Istanbul: Turkiye Diyanet Foundation, Centre for Islamic Studies. pp. 468–473. ISBN 978-975-389-408-1.
- Gündüz, Tufan (2001). "Kahramanmaraş". TDV Encyclopedia of Islam, Vol. 24 (Kāânî-i Şîrâzî – Kastamonu) (in Turkish). Istanbul: Turkiye Diyanet Foundation, Centre for Islamic Studies. pp. 192–196. ISBN 978-975-389-451-7.
- Peirce, Leslie (2003). Morality Tales: Law and Gender in the Ottoman Court of Aintab. University of California Press. ISBN 9780520228924. OCLC 52471062.
- Şahin, İlhan (1994). "Dulkadır Eyaleti". TDV Encyclopedia of Islam, Vol. 9 (Dârüsaâde – Dulkadi̇roğulları) (in Turkish). Istanbul: Turkiye Diyanet Foundation, Centre for Islamic Studies. pp. 552–553. ISBN 978-975-389-436-4.
- Ünlü, Ertan (25 December 2020). "Çukurova'da Bir Türkmen Ailesi: Özeroğulları". Journal of Turkish World Studies (in Turkish). 20 (2): 253–286. doi:10.32449/egetdid.811630 (inactive 12 July 2025). ISSN 2667-6729.
