= Dulkadir =

Dulkadir may refer to:

- Dulkadir tribe; see Qizilbash
- Beylik of Dulkadir
- Dulkadir Eyalet
