= Urfa Sanjak =

Sanjak of the Ottoman Empire

Coordinates: 37°9′30″N 38°47′30″E

Urfa Sancağı
- sanjak of the Ottoman Empire; Under Aleppo Eyalet (1579–1865); Under Aleppo Vilayet (1865–1918)
- 1579–1918
- Coat of arms
- Capital: Urfa
- History
  - Established: 1579
  - Armistice of Mudros: 1918
Succeeded by
Occupied Enemy Territory Administration
- Today part of: Turkey; Syria

The Urfa Sanjak (Turkish: Urfa Sancağı), previously known as Sanjak of Birejik, was a prefecture (sanjak) of the Ottoman Empire, located in modern-day Turkey and Syria. The city of Urfa was the Sanjak's capital.

== History ==
In the 17th century, members of the Reşwan Kurdish tribe are reported to have settled in the Urfa sanjak. Due to its significant population of Bedouin Arabs, Urfa was part of Syria according to the Treaty of Sèvres; but with the success of Kuva-yi Milliye forces during Turkish War of Independence, the sanjaks of Maraş, Antep and Urfa of the former Halep Eyalet remained in Turkey after 1921. Also, Antakya and İskenderun kazas of Halep Sanjak in one were separated from Syria as the Republic of Hatay in 1938. The republic was eventually merged with Turkey in 1939.

== Subdistricts ==
The sanjak was made up of five districts (kazas):

- Kaza of Urfa
- Kaza of Birecik
- Kaza of Rumkale
- Kaza of Suruç
- Kaza of Harran
