= Aintab Sanjak =

District of the Ottoman Empire

Coordinates: 37°4′0″N 37°23′0″E

Aintab Sanjak Ayntab Sancağı سنجق عنتاب
- sanjak of the Ottoman Empire; Under Aleppo Eyalet (1522–c. 1531); Under Dulkadir Eyalet (c. 1531–1818); Under Aleppo Eyalet (1818–1865); Under Aleppo Vilayet (1865–1918)
- 1549–1918
- Coat of arms

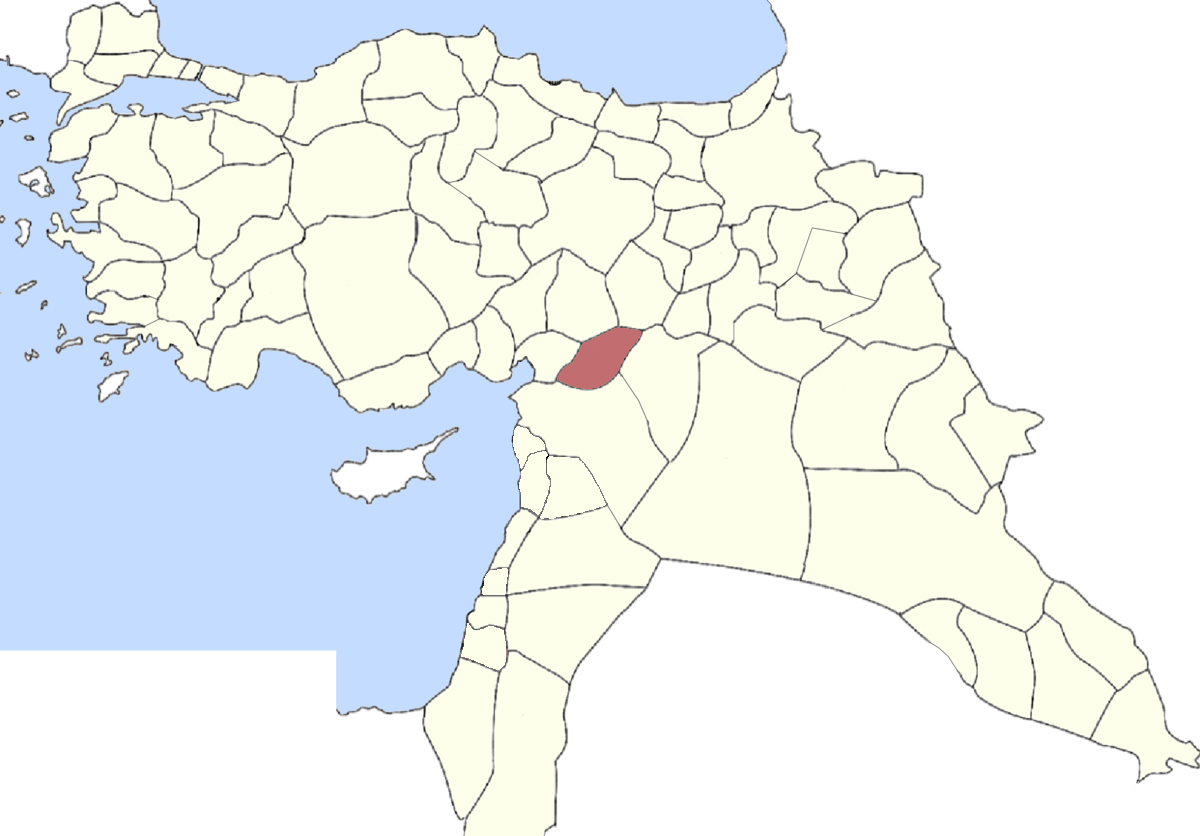
- Aintab Sanjak in 1914
- Capital: Aintab
- History
  - Established: 1549
  - Armistice of Mudros: 1918
Succeeded by
Occupied Enemy Territory Administration
- Today part of: Turkey

The Aintab Sanjak (Arabic: سنجق عنتاب) was a prefecture (sanjak) of the Ottoman Empire, located in modern-day Turkey. The city of Aintab (modern-day Gaziantep) was the sanjak's capital. It had a population of 187,899 in 1914.

== History ==
Initially, Aintab was part of Syria according to the Treaty of Sèvres; but the success of Turkish War of Independence, Maraş, Antep and Urfa sanjaks of former Aleppo Vilayet remained in Turkey after 1921. Also, Antakya and İskenderun kazas of Aleppo Sanjak in one were separated as the Republic of Hatay in 1938. The republic joined to Turkey in 1939.

=== Formation ===
Aintab first came under direct Ottoman control in 1522, when beylik of Dulkadir was dismantled and its incorporated into the empire's administrative structure. At first, though, the sanjak was put under the beglerbeglik of Aleppo rather than that of Dulkadir. Aintab was evidently seen as being culturally and economically more connected with northern Syria during this period. The sanjak's population was culturally diverse, and many inhabitants were bilingual in Turkish and Arabic, in addition to other languages.

Sometime in the early 1530s, possibly around 1531, Aintab sanjak was transferred to the beglerbeglik of Dulkadir. Although it had been the poorest sanjak in Aleppo, it immediately became the richest one in Dulkadir (the beglerbeglik covered a lot of mountainous terrain and lacked major cities).

=== Economic trends in the 1500s ===
When the Ottomans took over, Aintab sanjak was economically depressed. It was the poorest sanjak in Aleppo beglerbeglik. The early 1500s were a time of economic contraction for whole eastern Mediterranean region, but Aintab had been particularly effected because of a three-way political conflict in 1514-16 between the Ottomans, Dulkadirids, and Mamluks. As later court documents from Aintab show, the region experienced "dislocation and loss of population" during those years as people fled the area. This may have been more pronounced in the countryside than in the city of Aintab itself.

Recovery took a while, as the region was mostly neglected by Ottoman authorities until the mid-1530s. The Ottomans evidently lowered taxes in Aintab sanjak after they took over, which was their usual policy in recently-conquered areas – both to placate the locals and to stimulate economic growth and recovery. The Ottoman tax assessments of 1520 and 1536 show a significant drop in the tax rates collected in Aintab sanjak; Leslie Peirce interprets this as the Ottomans lowering taxes in the meantime.

In the following years, beginning in the mid-1530s, the Aintab area's economy began to recover. One factor was Süleyman the Magnificent's successful Mesopotamian campaign against Safavid Iran in 1534-36, which made trade routes in the region more secure. There was also a broader trend of economic growth in the eastern Mediterranean region during this time. Tax registers from 1536 and 1543 show increasing amounts of tax revenue coming from Aintab sanjak, although this is partly because, now that their control of the region was settling in, the Ottomans had raised taxes again by 1543.

Economic recovery continued for several decades. For example, tax registers document the recovery of a dye workshop in Hıyam, the largest village in the sanjak. The 1543 tax register described the workshop as "abandoned and in a state of disrepair", but by 1574 it was listed along with a productive tax revenue, indicating that textile dyeing had picked up again in Hıyam. On the other hand, a butchers' workshop in Hıyam listed without revenue in 1543 does not seem to have recovered; Hıyam was no longer "a meat-processing center".

=== Social shifts in the 1500s ===
This period of economic recovery also involved social change. Tax registers from Aintab sanjak show a trend where production of staple grains like wheat and barley was shifting more toward smaller villages. Meanwhile, in the larger villages, people were increasingly employed in "cash crop farming, sharecropping, and non-farming occupations such as textile production and food processing". As more grain farming was done in smaller villages, new lands were being brought into cultivation. So were mezraa lands that had previously been abandoned. Court records from Aintab in 1540-41 document various land grants for both new and abandoned farmland.

The expansion of farmland, combined with the increased number of villagers working in non-farming occupations, meant that demand for labor was increasing. This in turn meant that tribal nomads had more incentive to settle down in one place – which the Ottoman authorities encouraged. These newly-settled-down tribespeople brought with them certain tribal customs, like abduction and private vengeance, that "sat less well" with the townspeople. Many court cases dealt with criminal prosecution of these practices.

There were also changes in household structure and gender roles. The sanjak's tax registers show an increasing number of bachelors. This is possibly a side effect of increased economic prosperity: as "demand for land as well as for non-farming jobs outpaced availability", more and more men had a hard time getting into a good enough financial position to get married and start their own household. These men would have typically lived with their parents or married older brothers; it was seen as less acceptable for unmarried men to live alone. Meanwhile, young women and their families adjusted their plans to deal with the decreased rate of marriage – which often put young women in a difficult position.

=== Later ===
In 1818, Aintab sanjak was moved from Dulkadir Eyalet back into Aleppo Eyalet.
