= Zor Sanjak =

Sanjak of the Ottoman Empire

Coordinates: 35.333333°N 40.15°E

Sanjak of Zor Deyr-i-Zor sancağı
- Sanjak of the Ottoman Empire
- 1857–1917
- Flag

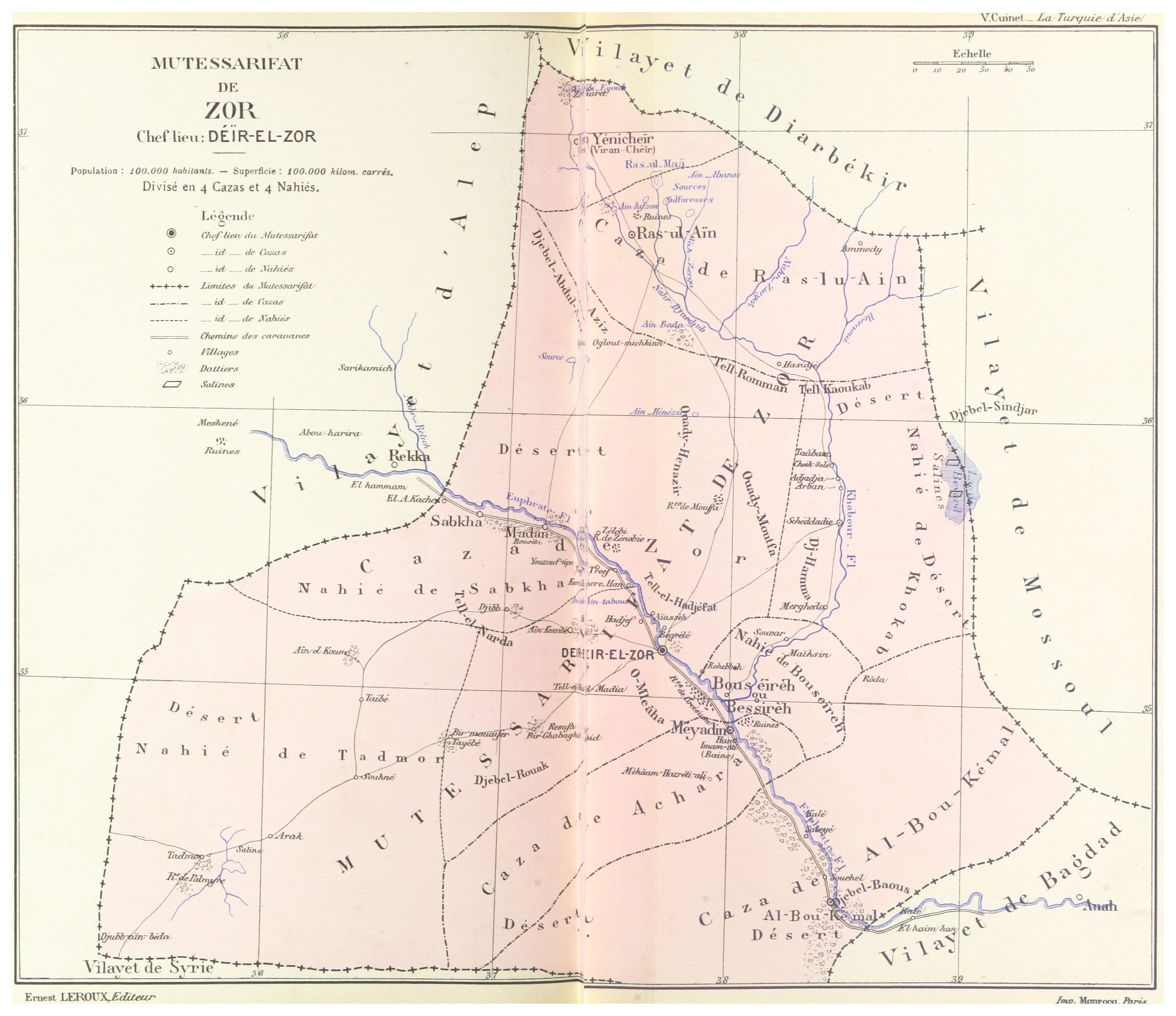
- Zor Sanjak in 1892
- Capital: Deir Ez-Zor
- Area
  - 1900s: 100,000 km^{2} (39,000 sq mi)
- Population
  - 1900s: 100,000
- History
  - Established: 1857
  - Disestablished: 1917
Preceded by	Succeeded by
Vilayet of Baghdad	Occupied Enemy Territory Administration
- Today part of: Syria; Turkey

The Sanjak of Zor (Turkish: Deyr-i-Zor sancağı) was a sanjak of the Ottoman Empire, which was created in 1857. Some of its area was separated from the Baghdad Vilayet. Zor was sometimes mentioned as being part of the Aleppo Vilayet, or of the Syria Vilayet.

The capital was Deir ez-Zor, a town on the right (i.e., south) bank of the Euphrates, which was also the only considerable town of the sanjak. At the beginning of the 20th century, the sanjak had an area of 38,600 square miles (100,000 km^{2}), and an estimated population of 100,000, mostly Arab nomads. The capital itself was just a village before becoming the centre of the sanjak.

After the fall of the Ottoman Empire in 1918, Ottoman forces withdrew from the area leaving a no man's land. The region was subsequently occupied by Iraqi nationalists representing the Arab Kingdom of Syria in Damascus, and after the Paulet–Newcombe Agreement in 1923, it became part of the French Mandate for Syria.

== Administrative divisions ==
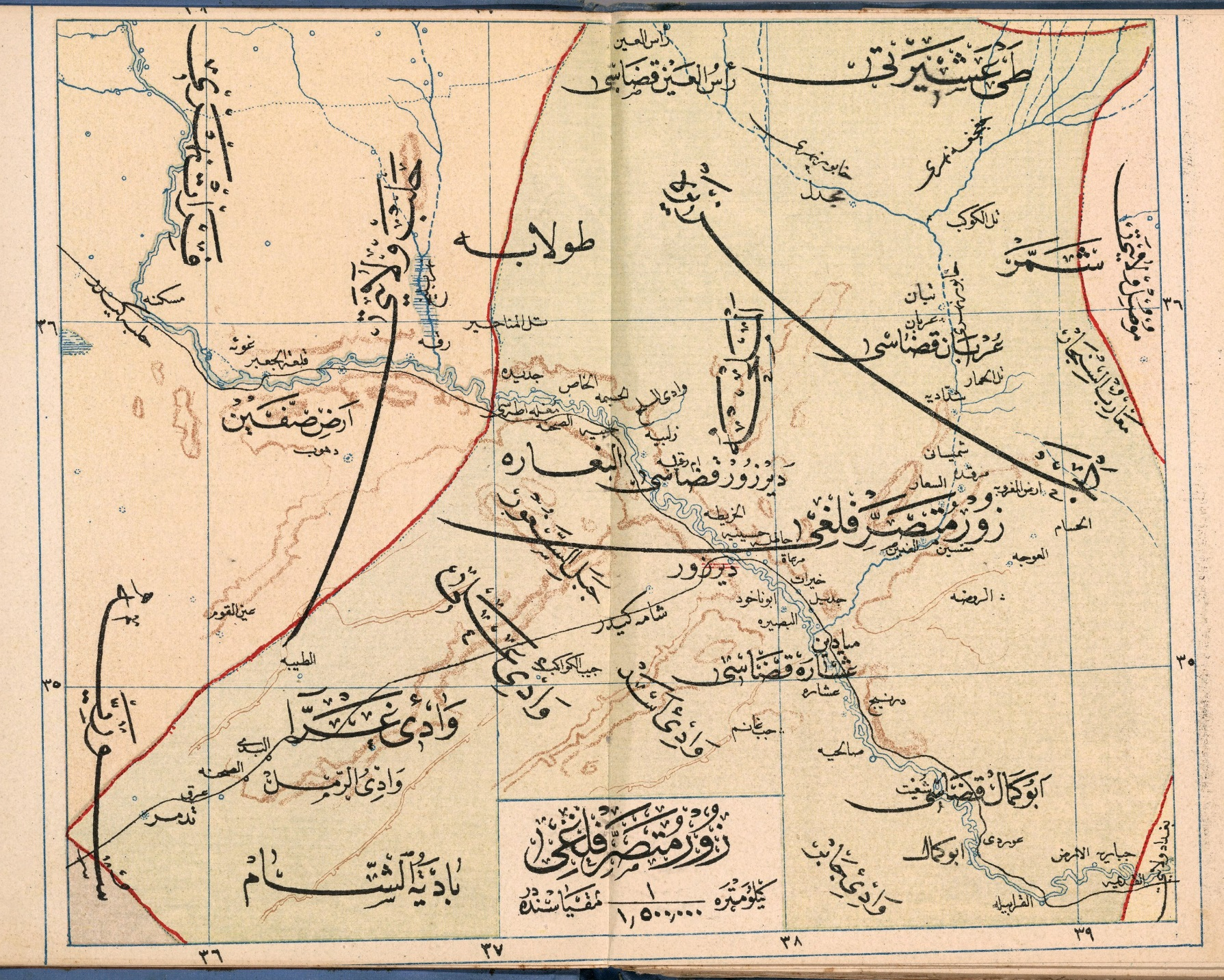
Map of Zor Sanjak in 1907

Kazas of the Sanjak:

1. Kaza of Deyr
2. Kaza of Resü'l Ayn
3. Kaza of Asare
4. Kaza of Ebukemal
