= Marash Sanjak =

Prefecture of the Ottoman Empire

Coordinates: 37°35′0″N 36°56′0″E

Marash Sanjak Maraş Sancağı مرعش سنجاقی سنجق مرعش
- sanjak of the Ottoman Empire; Under Aleppo Eyalet (1549–1865); Under Aleppo Vilayet (1865–1918)
- 1549–1918
- Coat of arms
- Capital: Marash
- History
  - Established: 1549
  - Armistice of Mudros: 1918
Succeeded by
Occupied Enemy Territory Administration
- Today part of: Turkey

The Marash Sanjak (Turkish: Maraş Sancağı, Ottoman Turkish: مرعش سنجاقی, Arabic: سنجق مرعش), previously known as Sanjak of Ablistan, was a prefecture (sanjak) of the Ottoman Empire, located in modern-day Turkey. The city of Marash was the Sanjak's capital. It had a population of 187,899 in 1914.

== History ==
Marash was part of zone of French influence according in Treaty of Sèvres, but after the success of Turkish War of Independence, Maraş, Antep and Urfa (sanjaks of former Halep Eyalet) were taken back by Turkey.

== Subdistricts ==
The sanjak was made up of five districts (kazas):

- Kaza of Marash (Maraş)
- Kaza of Zeytun
- Kaza of Elbistan
- Kaza of Andırın
- Kaza of Pazarcık
