= Aleppo Sanjak =

Prefecture of the Ottoman Empire

Coordinates: 36°13′0″N 37°10′0″E

Aleppo Sanjak Haleb Sancağı سنجق حلب
- sanjak of the Ottoman Empire under Aleppo Eyalet (1549–1865) under Aleppo Vilayet (1865–1918)
- 1549–1918
- Coat of arms

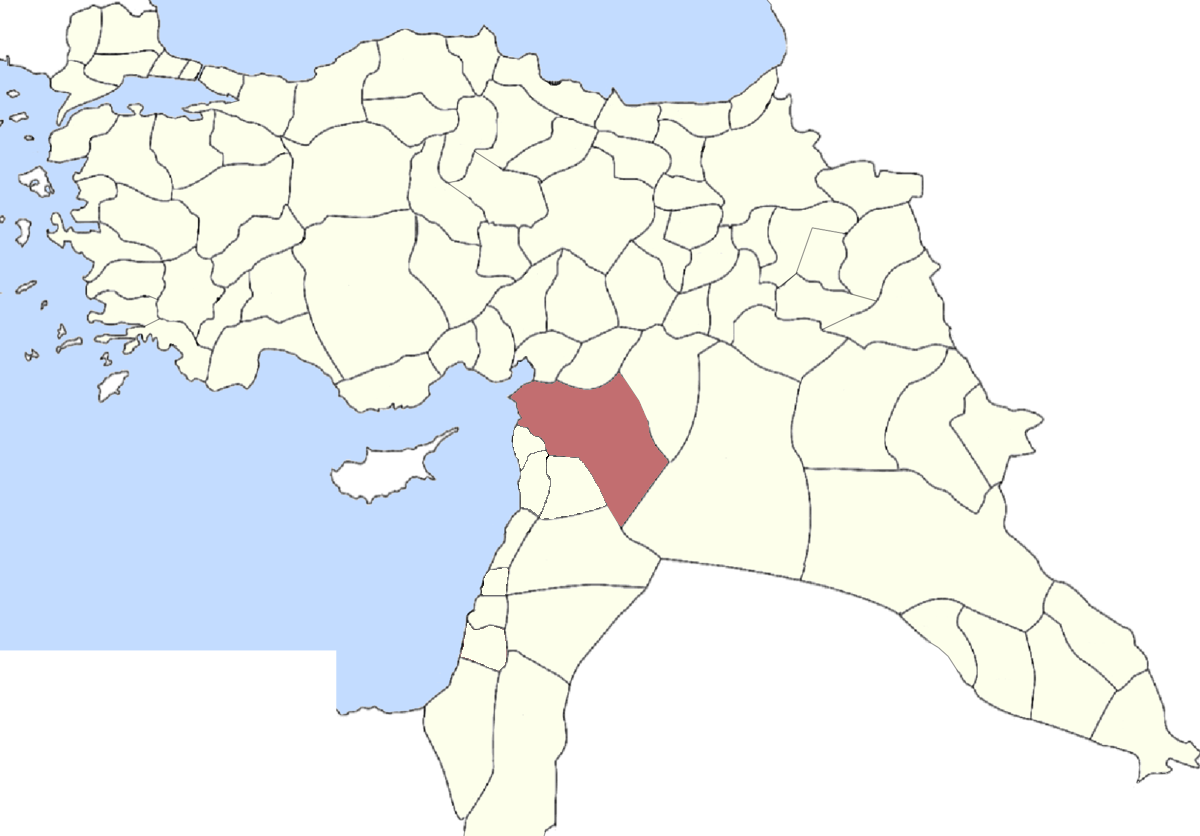
- Aleppo Sanjak in 1914
- Capital: Aleppo
- History
  - Established: 1549
  - Armistice of Mudros: 1918
Succeeded by
Occupied Enemy Territory Administration
- Today part of: Syria; Turkey

The Aleppo Sanjak (Arabic: سنجق حلب) was a prefecture (sanjak) of the Ottoman Empire, located in modern-day Syria and Turkey. The city of Aleppo was the Sanjak's capital.

== Subdistricts ==
- Aleppo Sanjak had many cities: Aleppo, İskenderun, Antakya, Belen, Idlib, Al-Bab and Jisr al-Shughur.

== Later history ==
The territory of Aleppo Sanjak was divided between Turkey and Syria. Antakya and İskenderun (kazas of Halep Sanjak) were part of Syria after the Turkish War of Independence, but they became Hatay State in 1938, and finally joined Turkey in 1939.
