= Adana Eyalet =

Administrative division of the Ottoman Empire

Eyalet-i Adana
- Eyalet of the Ottoman Empire
- 1608–1865
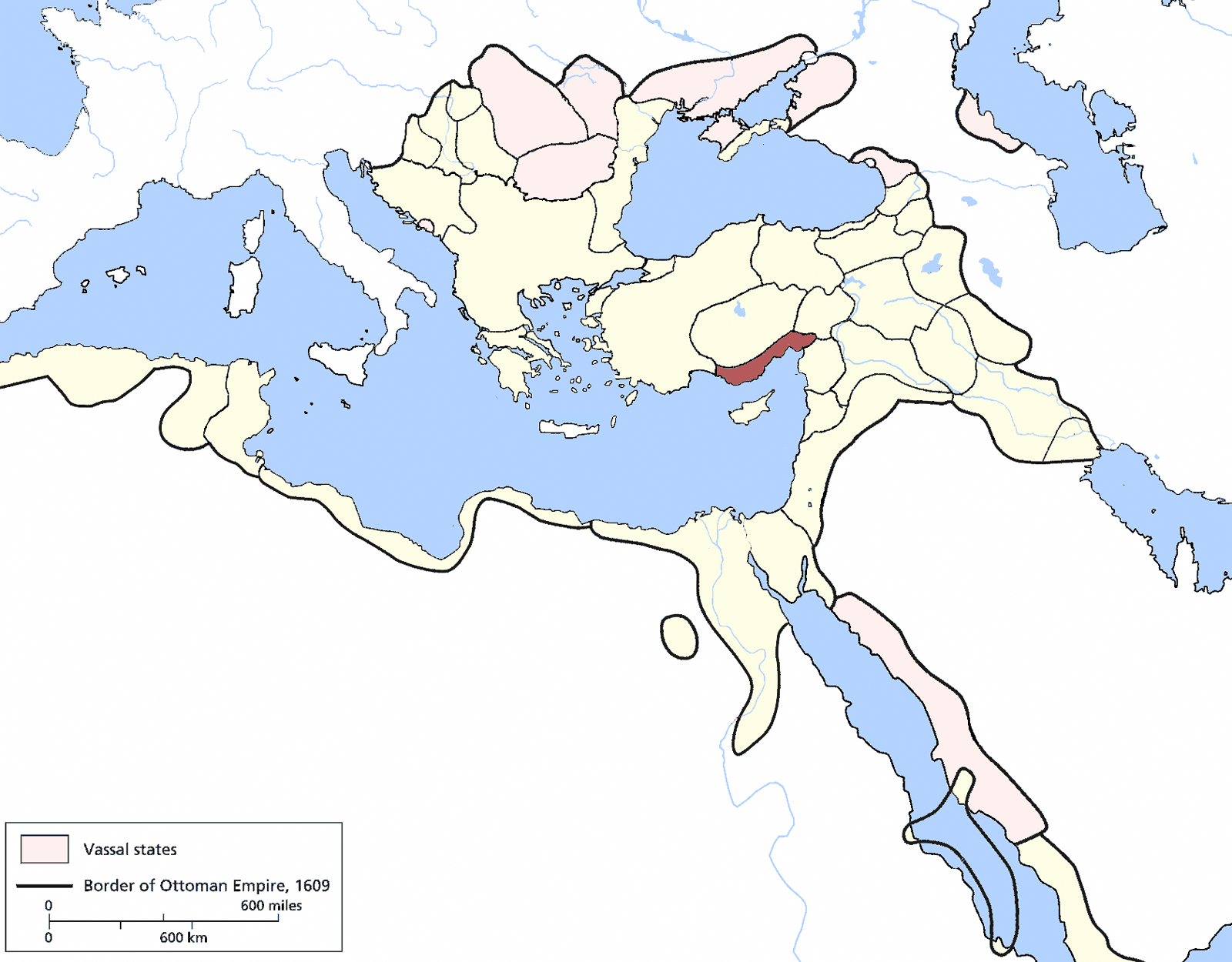
- The Adana Eyalet in 1609
- Capital: Adana
- Area
  - Coordinates: 36.76°N 34.23°E
- History
  - Established: 1608
  - Disestablished: 1865
Preceded by	Succeeded by
Ramadanid Emirate	Adana Vilayet
- Today part of: Turkey

The Eyalet of Adana (Ottoman Turkish: ایالت ادنه; Eyālet-i Adana) was an eyalet of the Ottoman Empire, established in 1608, when it was separated from the Eyalet of Aleppo. Its reported area in the 19th century was 11,409 square miles (29,550 km^{2}).

== History ==
The Ramadanids played a key role in 15th-century Ottoman-Mamluk relations, being a buffer state located in the Mamluk al-'Awasim frontier zone. In 1517, Selim I incorporated the beylik into the Ottoman Empire after his conquest of the Mamluk state. The beys of Ramadanids held the administration of the Ottoman sanjak of Adana in a hereditary manner until 1608.

In 1833, Adana came under Egyptian rule for a short time after the settlement of the Convention of Kütahya.

== Administrative divisions ==
Sanjaks between 1700 and 1740:
1. Adana Sanjak (Paşa Sancağı , Adana)
2. Tarsus Sanjak (Tarsus)
3. Sis Sanjak (Sis Sansağı, Kozan)
4. Ichil Sanjak (İçil Sancağı or İçel Sancağı, Anamur-Silifke)
5. Alaya Sanjak (Alâ'iyye Sancağı, Alanya)
Sanjaks in the mid-19th century:
1. Adana Sanjak
2. Tarsus Sanjak
3. Alayeh Sanjak
4. Sis Sanjak
5. Piyas Sanjak (Payas?)
6. Anemur Sanjak
7. Selefkeh Sanjak
