= Establishment of the Emirate of Transjordan =

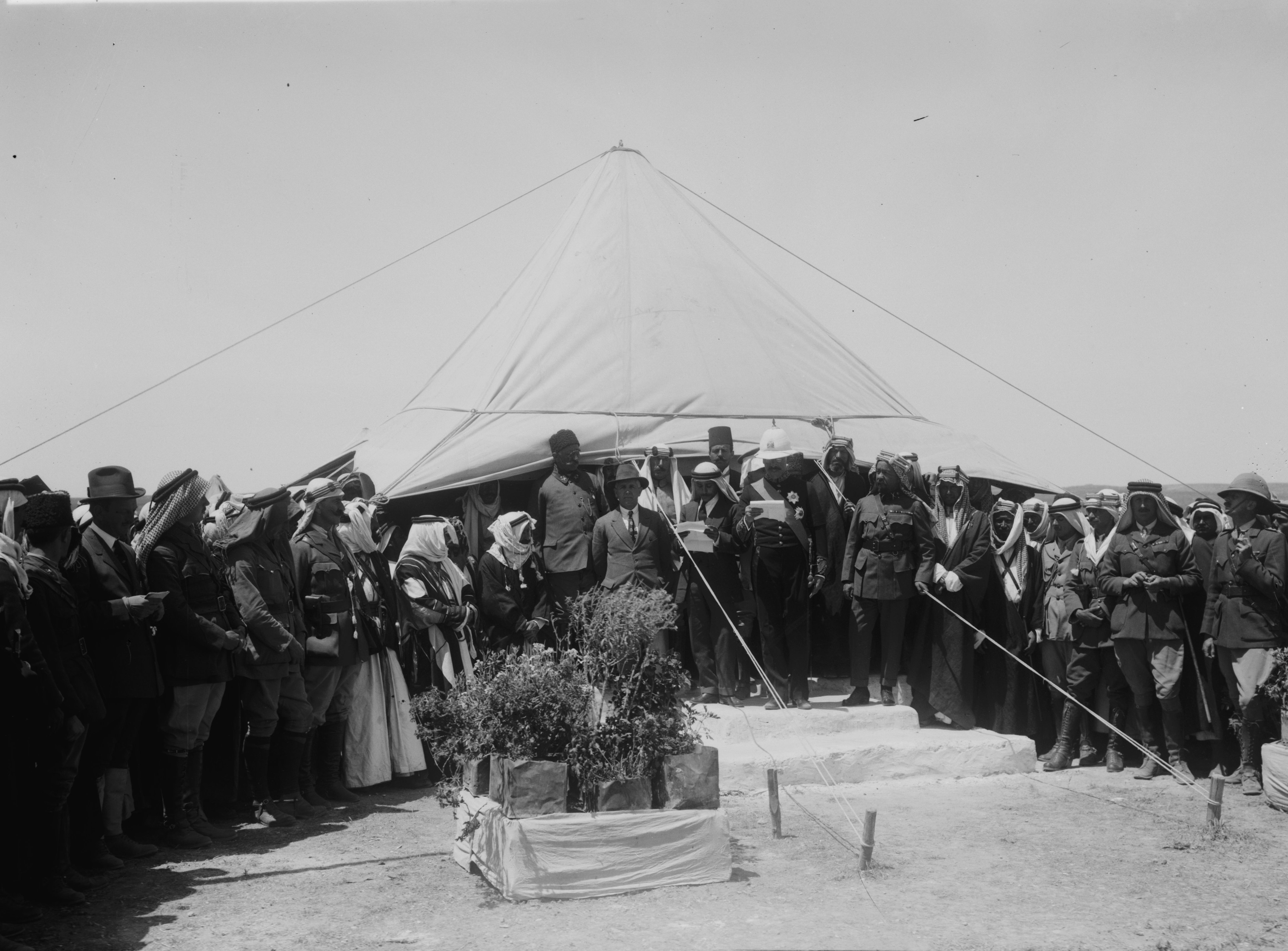
Proclamation of Abdullah as leader of Transjordan, April 1921

Establishment of the Emirate of Transjordan refers to the government that was set up in Transjordan on 11 April 1921, following a brief interregnum period.

Abdullah, the second son of Sharif Hussein (leader of the 1916 Great Arab Revolt against the Ottoman Empire), arrived from Hejaz by train in Ma'an in southern Transjordan on 21 November 1920. His stated aim was fighting the French in Syria, after they had defeated the short-lived Arab Kingdom of Syria during the Battle of Maysalun on 24 July 1920.

Transjordan then was in disarray and widely considered to be ungovernable with its dysfunctional local governments. Abdullah spent almost four months with his base in Ma'an, which he left in late February arriving in Amman on 2 March 1921. Following the Cairo Conference and Abdullah's meeting with Colonial Secretary Winston Churchill in Jerusalem, the Emirate of Transjordan was established on 11 April 1921.

== Background ==
Four centuries of Ottoman rule over the Levant and the Hejaz came to an end during World War I by the 1916 Arab Revolt; driven by long-term resentment towards the Ottoman authorities, and growing Arab nationalism. The revolt was led by Sharif Hussein of Mecca, and his sons Abdullah, Faisal and Ali, members of the Hashemite family of the Hejaz, descendants of Muhammad. Locally, the revolt garnered the support of the Transjordanian tribes, including Bedouins, Circassians and Christians. The Allies of World War I, including Britain and France, whose imperial interests converged with the Arabist cause, offered support. The revolt started on 5 June 1916 from Medina and pushed northwards until the fighting reached Transjordan in the Battle of Aqaba on 6 July 1917. The revolt reached its climax when Faisal entered Damascus in October 1918, and established an Arab-led military administration in OETA East, later declared as the Arab Kingdom of Syria, both of which Transjordan was part of. During this period, the southernmost region of the country, including Ma'an and Aqaba, was also claimed by the neighboring Kingdom of Hejaz.

The nascent Hashemite Kingdom over the region of Syria was forced to surrender to French troops on 24 July 1920 during the Battle of Maysalun; the French occupied only the northern part of the Syrian Kingdom, leaving Transjordan in a period of interregnum. Arab aspirations failed to gain international recognition, due mainly to the secret 1916 Sykes–Picot Agreement, which divided the region into French and British spheres of influence, and the 1917 Balfour Declaration, which promised Palestine to Jews. This was seen by the Hashemites and the Arabs as a betrayal of their previous agreements with the British, including the 1915 McMahon–Hussein Correspondence, in which the British stated their willingness to recognize the independence of a unified Arab state stretching from Aleppo to Aden under the rule of the Hashemites.

== Salt conference ==
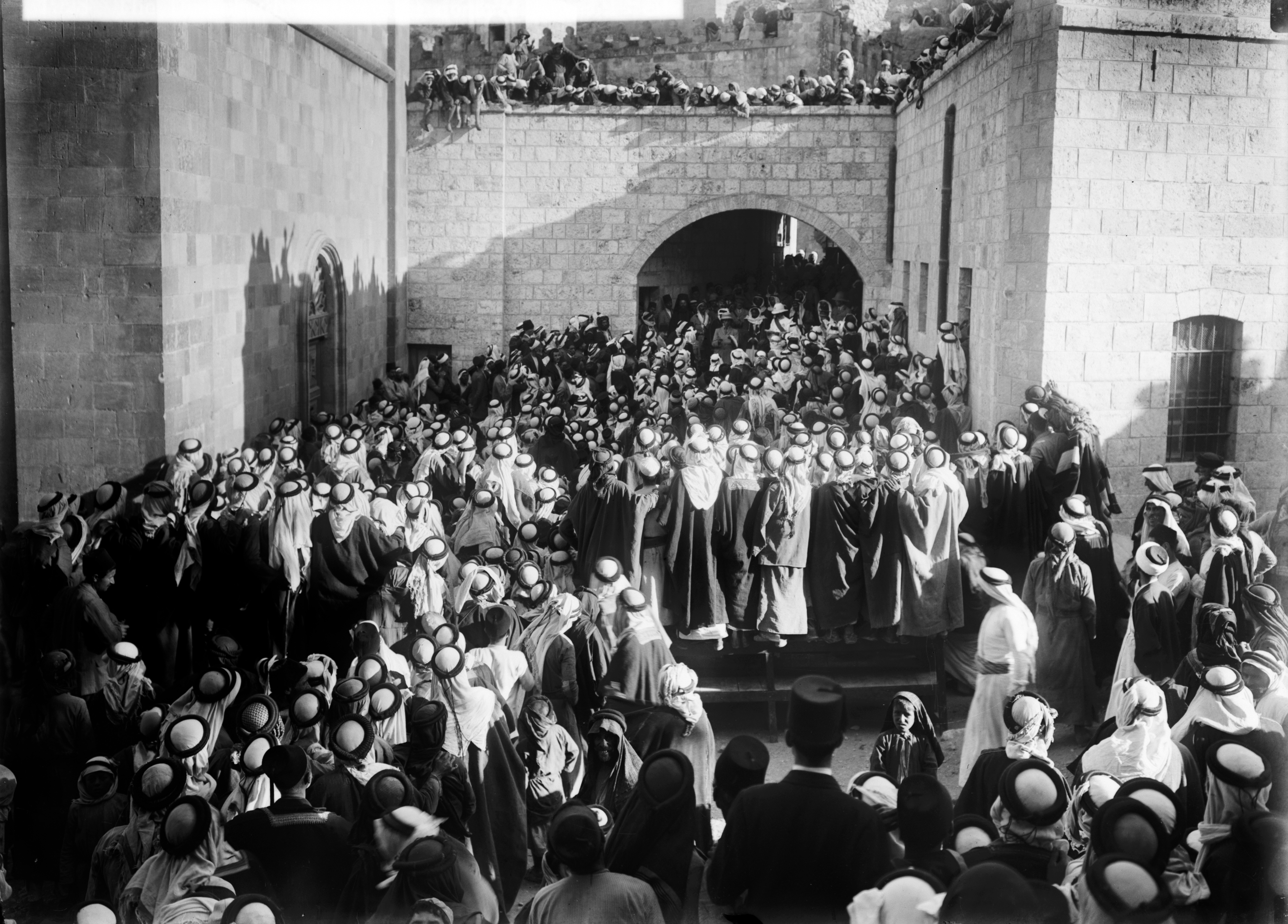
Al-Salt residents gather on 20 August 1920 during the British High Commissioner's visit to Transjordan.

Following the fall of the Arab Kingdom of Syria on 24 July 1920, Transjordanian merchant and tribal leaders and British officials assigned to the region competed for political influence. The British High Commissioners for Palestine and Transjordan, Herbert Samuel, travelled to Transjordan on 21 August to meet with Al-Salt city's residents. He there declared to six hundred Transjordanian notables that the British government had decided that the administration of Transjordan would be kept separate from that of Palestine and that British advisors will aid the creation of local governments throughout the area. The High Commissioner promised that the British government would provide Transjordan with the goods it needs and that free trade with Palestine will continue to help spur economic growth.

== Umm Qais conference ==
The second meeting between British officials and the notables of Transjordan occurred in Umm Qais nearly a month later on 2 September. Major Fitzroy Somerset received a petition from the local residents who demanded an independent Arab government in Transjordan to be led by an Arab prince (emir), and a representative body which would have the power to enact legislation and administer the country's affairs. They also demanded that land sale in Transjordan to Jews be stopped as well as preventing Jewish immigration there; that Britain fund and establish a national army; and that free trade be maintained between Transjordan and the rest of the region.

== Local governments ==
Following the outcomes of the two conferences, the British dispatched six officers to aid the establishment of local governments in Transjordan which existed between August 1920 and March 1921. They included:

1. the "Government of Dayr Yousef" in Ajloun's Kura district under Najib Abd Al-Qader Al-Shuraydah
2. the "Government of Jabal Ajloun" in Jabal Ajloun under Rashed Al-Khuzai bin Durgham of the Freihat
3. the "Government of Moab" in Karak under Rufayfan Majali
4. a government in Tafila under Salih Umran
5. a government in Al-Salt under Mazhar Raslan
6. a semi-official government in Ajloun's Al-Wustiyya district under Naji Mazid Al-Azzam
7. an administration in Irbid under Ali Khulqi Al-Sharayri
8. an administration in Jerash under the Kayid branch of the Utum family
9. an administration in Ramtha under Nasir Al-Fawwaz Al-Barakat of the Zu'bi family

== Abdullah's arrival in Transjordan ==
Sa`id Al-Mufti, a leading figure in Transjordan's Circassian community then, sent out a telegram to Sharif Hussein demanding that he send one of his sons to save the country from chaos. Sa'id remembered:

After the French occupation of Syria, Transjordan lived in chaos. It was not long before we sent to King Hussein bin Ali a telegram demanding in it that he send one of his sons to the country to save it from chaos.

Abdullah's ambitions were affected when the Iraqi revolt against the British began in May 1920 and Faisal's Arab Kingdom of Syria fell to the French in July 1920. Abdullah left Medina in mid-October; the 800-kilometre (500 mi) journey took 27 days due to the poor state of the Hejaz railway which had been heavily damaged during World War I.

The stated reason for his travel was to redeem the Kingdom his brother Faisal had lost.

Abdullah arrived in Ma'an in southern Transjordan on 21 November 1920. Sources differ as to the number of men he had with him, from 300, to 1,200, to 2,000.

On his arrival in Ma'an Abdullah arranged for letters to dispatched to invite the leaders of the Syrian National Congress and notable Transjordanians, to meet him in Ma'an and discuss the "firm intentions of the people". Two weeks later, on 5 December, he issued a proclamation which stated that his sole intention was to "expel the invaders". The British had discouraged some of the prominent Transjordanians from allying with Abdullah, including Mazhar Raslan, the mutasarrif of Salt. Rufayfan Pasha, the mutasarrif of Karak, did not go to Ma'an at all, and other officials demanded a guarantee for their army pensions or tried to extract other forms of payment before they would join Abdullah.

In January 1921, Abdullah's forces moved into Kerak without opposition from the British. Abdullah spent almost four months with his base in Ma'an, which he left on 28 February 1921 and arrived in Amman on 2 March 1921.

By early February 1921 the British had concluded that "the Sherif's influence has now completely replaced that of the local governments and of the British advisers in Trans-Jordania, and [that] it must be realised that if and when Abdullah does advance northwards in the spring, he will be considered by the majority of the population to be the ruler of that country."

== Cairo Conference ==
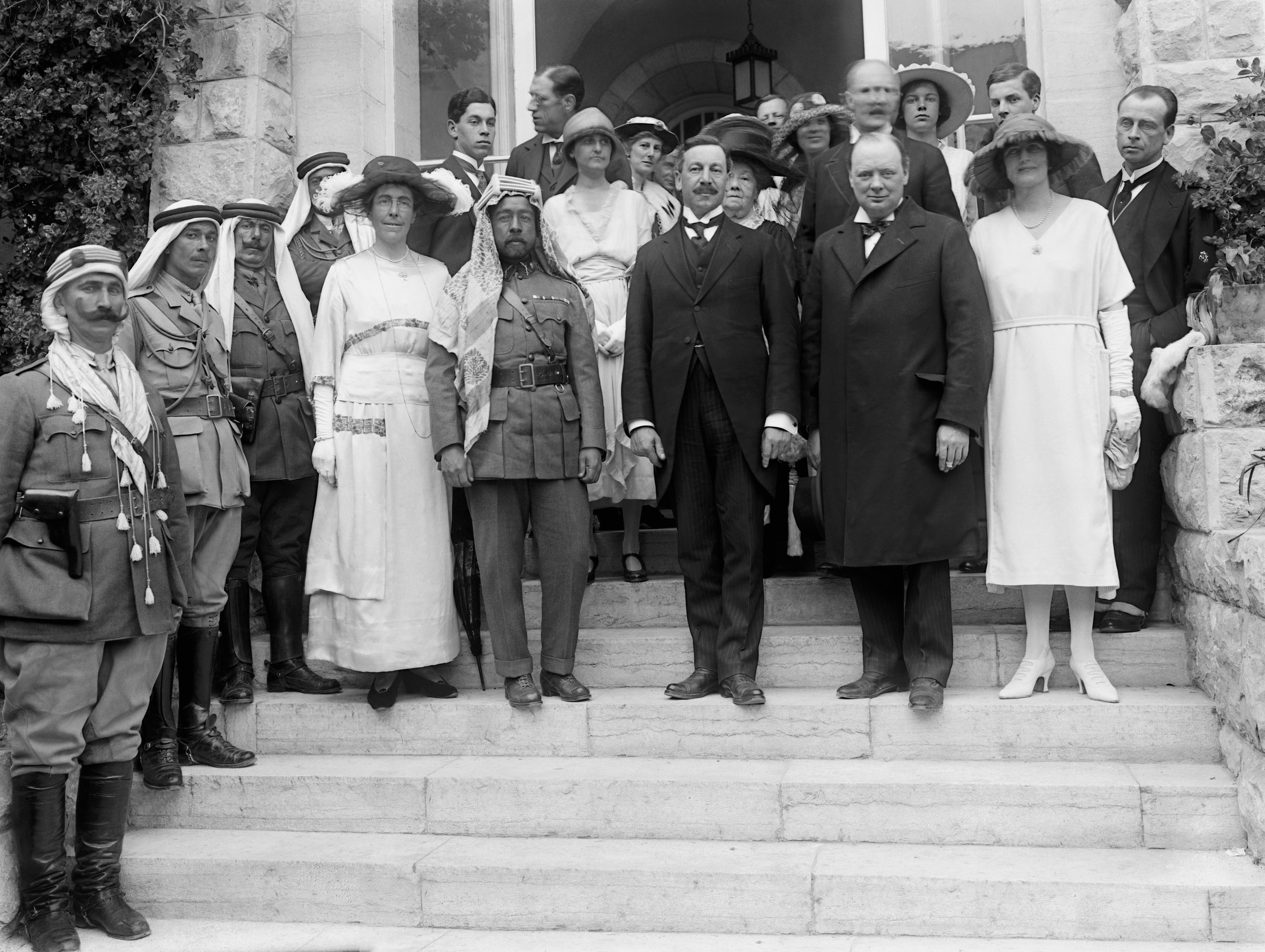
Abdullah posing with British officials and his entourage on 28 March 1921 in front of the British Government House in Jerusalem.

The Cairo Conference was convened on 12 March 1921 by Winston Churchill, then Britain's Colonial Secretary, and lasted until 30 March; the conference was to endorse an arrangement whereby Transjordan would be added to the Palestine mandate, with Abdullah as the emir under the authority of the High Commissioner, and with the condition that the Jewish National Home provisions of the Palestine mandate would not apply there.

== Jerusalem meeting ==
Abdullah then headed to Jerusalem to meet with Winston Churchill on 28 March 1921.

== Proclamation of the Emirate of Transjordan ==
Following agreement with Colonial Secretary Winston Churchill, the Emirate of Transjordan was established on 11 April 1921.

== Bibliography ==
- Bradshaw, Tancred (30 March 2012). Britain and Jordan: Imperial Strategy, King Abdullah I and the Zionist Movement. I.B.Tauris. ISBN 978-0-85772-114-3.
- Salibi, Kamal S. (1998). The Modern History of Jordan. London: I B Tauris. ISBN 978-1860643316.
- Patai, Raphael (8 December 2015). Kingdom of Jordan. Princeton University Press. ISBN 978-1-4008-7799-7.
- Vatikiotis, P.J. (18 May 2017). Politics and the Military in Jordan: A Study of the Arab Legion, 1921–1957. Taylor & Francis. ISBN 978-1-351-78303-3.
- Paris, Timothy J. (2003). Britain, the Hashemites and Arab Rule: The Sherifian Solution. Routledge. ISBN 978-1-135-77191-1.
- Sicker, Martin (1999). Reshaping Palestine: From Muhammad Ali to the British Mandate, 1831–1922. Greenwood Publishing Group. ISBN 978-0-275-96639-3.
- Wasserstein, Bernard (2008). Israel and Palestine: Why They Fight and Can They Stop?. Profile Books. ISBN 978-1-84668-092-2.
- Wilson, Mary Christina (1990). King Abdullah, Britain and the Making of Jordan. Cambridge University Press. ISBN 978-0-521-39987-6.
- Kirkbride, Sir Alec Seath (1956). A Crackle of Thorns: Experiences in the Middle East. J. Murray.
- Rudd, Jeffery A (1993). "Chapter 8: Abdullah and the Creation of Transjordan" (PDF). Abdallah bin al-Husayn: The Making of an Arab Political Leader, 1908–1921 (PhD). SOAS University of London.
