= Louis Bols =

British Army general (1867–1930)

Lieutenant-General Sir Louis Bols KCB KCMG DSO
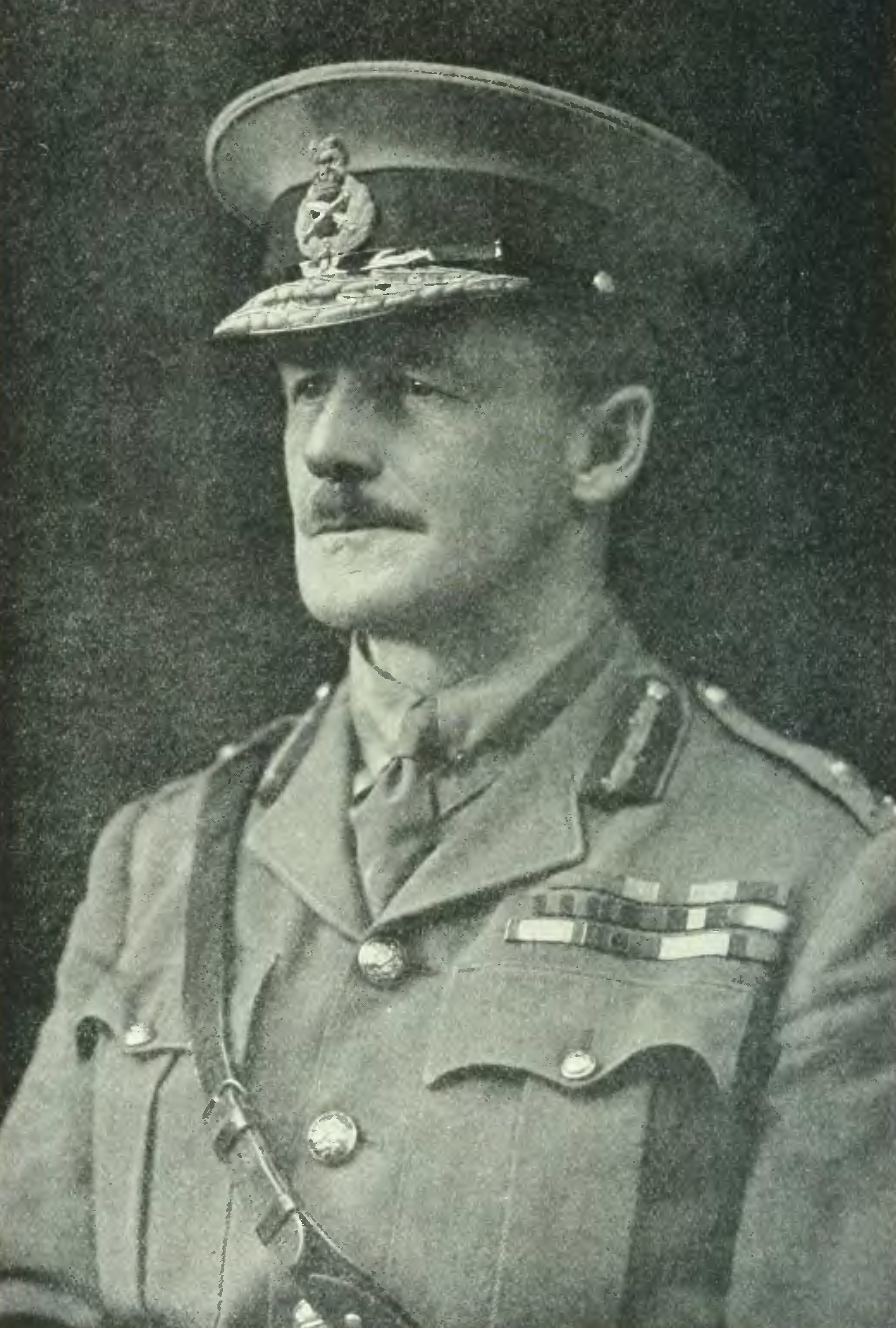
- Born: 23 November 1867; Cape Town, Cape Colony
- Died: 13 September 1930 (aged 62)
- Relatives: Major General Eric Bols (son)
- Military career
- Allegiance: United Kingdom
- Branch: British Army
- Service years: 1887–1920
- Rank: Lieutenant-General
- Unit: Devonshire Regiment
- Commands: 43rd (Wessex) Infantry Division; 24th Division; 84th Infantry Brigade; Dorsetshire Regiment
- Conflicts: Chitral Expedition; Second Boer War; First World War
- Awards: Knight Commander of the Order of the Bath; Knight Commander of the Order of St Michael and St George; Distinguished Service Order; Mentioned in Despatches (6)
- Other work: Governor of Bermuda (1927–30)

Lieutenant-General Sir Louis Jean Bols, KCB, KCMG, DSO (23 November 1867 – 13 September 1930) was a British Army general, who served as chief of staff of Edmund Allenby's Third Army on the Western Front and in the Sinai and Palestine campaign during the First World War. From 1927 until his death he served as the Governor of Bermuda.

== Early life and education ==
Louis Jean Bols, "the son of a Belgian diplomat", was born in Cape Town to Louis Guillaume Michael Joseph Bols of Belgium and Mary Wilhelmina Davidson. He was educated at Lancing College in England and Bishop's College School in Canada.

== Early military career ==
After graduating from the Royal Military College, Sandhurst, Bols was commissioned a second lieutenant in the Devonshire Regiment on 5 February 1887, and was promoted to lieutenant, dated 22 September 1889.

In 1891–92 he served in Burma, including operations in the Kachin Hills, and received the operational medal with clasp. In 1895 he served with the Chitral Relief Force under Sir Robert Low as adjutant and quartermaster at the British Military Depot. Promotion to captain followed on 18 January 1897, and he served as adjutant of the 2nd Battalion of his regiment from 17 February 1899.

Following the outbreak of the Second Boer War in late 1899, his battalion was sent to South Africa, where he served as adjutant of the battalion throughout the war. He was present at the Battle of Colenso (15 December 1899), Battle of Vaal Krantz (5–7 February 1900), Battle of the Tugela Heights (14–27 February 1900) and the Relief of Ladysmith (1 March 1900), and later in operations in the Transvaal and Orange River Colony. For his services in the war, he was twice mentioned in dispatches, received the Queen's South Africa Medal, and was appointed a Companion of the Distinguished Service Order (DSO). After peace was declared in May 1902, Bols left South Africa on board the SS Bavarian and arrived in the United Kingdom the following month. His tenure as adjutant ended in February 1903, when he was posted to Staff College.

Bols, who in January 1905 returned to his regiment as captain, was in February made commander of a company of gentlemen cadets. Promoted to major in October 1906, he was in January 1907 made a brigade major.

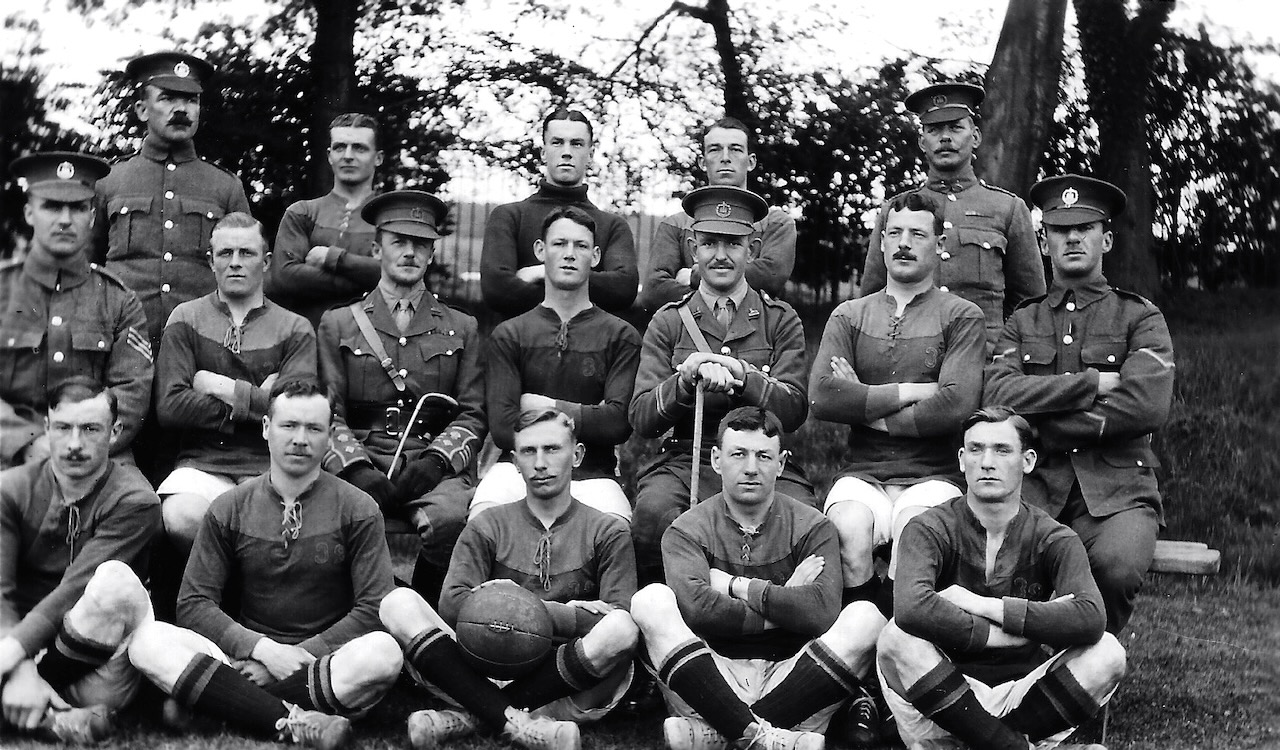
Group photo of the 1st Battalion, Dorset Regiment Football XI, with several officers. Belfast 1913/14. Middle row, third from left is Lieutenant Colonel L. J. Bols; third from right, middle row is Captain Algernon Ransome, the battalion's adjutant.

In May 1910 he went to the Staff College, Camberley, as a deputy assistant quartermaster general and was promoted to the temporary rank of lieutenant colonel while in this role, before succeeding Lieutenant Colonel Charles Hull as a GSO2 at the Staff College in February 1912. He transferred from the Devonshires to the Dorsetshire Regiment as a lieutenant colonel in February 1914 and took command of the 2nd Battalion of his new regiment, five months before the start of the First World War.

== First World War ==
Bols led his battalion, which formed part of the 15th Infantry Brigade of the 5th Division of the British Expeditionary Force (BEF), overseas to France in the opening weeks of the war. He was wounded in November, during the First Battle of Ypres, "and briefly made a prisoner of war but managed to escape".

At the Second Battle of Ypres in 1915 Bols, having been promoted to the temporary rank of brigadier general in February, held the command of the 84th Infantry Brigade, part of the 28th Division. That same month saw him made a Companion of the Order of the Bath. while in June his permanent rank was advanced to brevet colonel. In late September he moved to the newly created XII Corps to serve as its brigadier general, general staff.

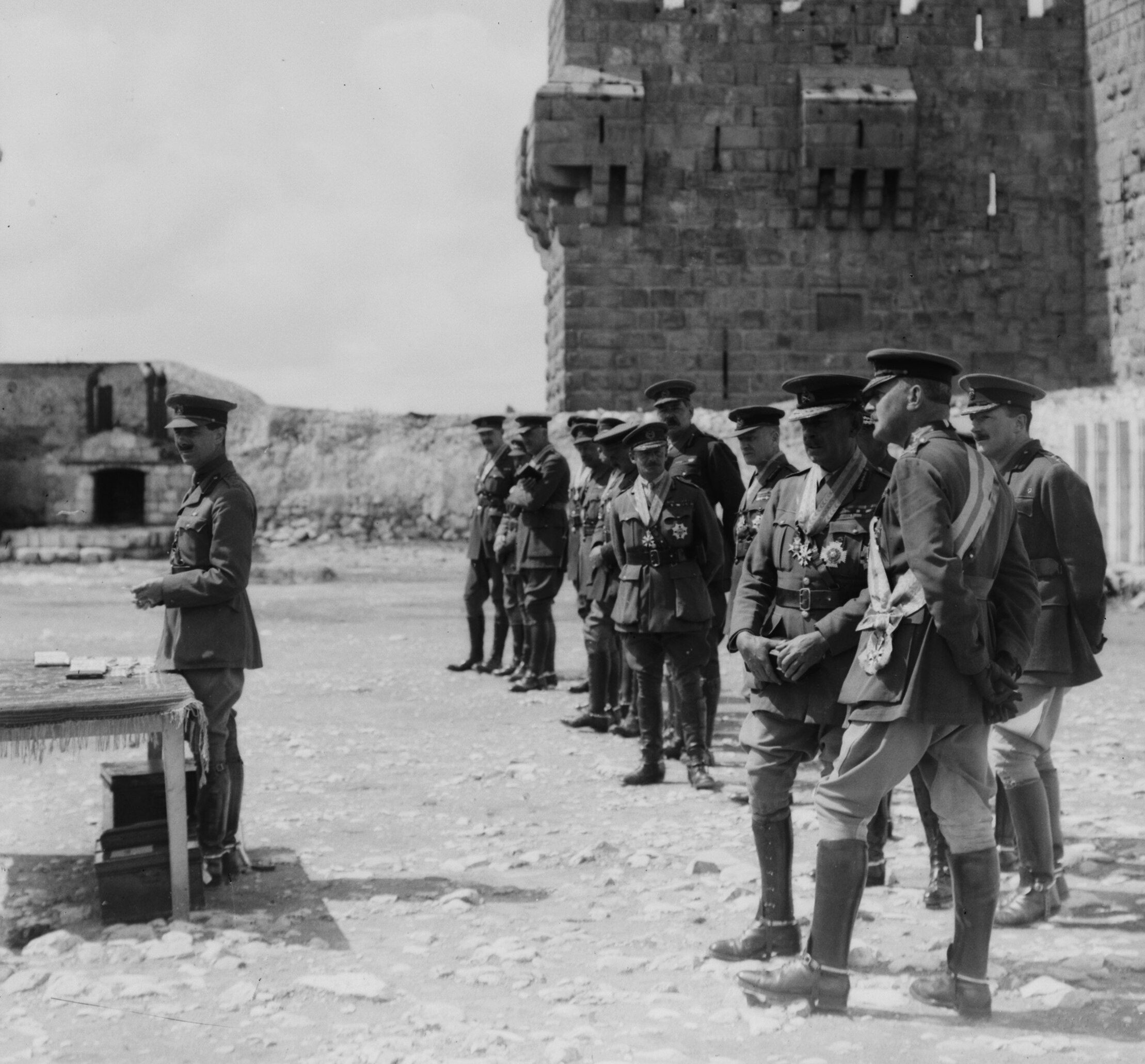
The investiture by H.R.H. the Duke of Connaught, February 1918. Decorated Generals Allenby, in conversation with Lieutenant General Chetwode, in foreground. Stood nearby is Allenby's MGGS, Major General Bols.

In October that year he was promoted again, now to temporary major general, and served as major general, general staff (MGGS) of the Third Army of the BEF, commanded briefly by General Sir Charles Monro before he was replaced by General Sir Edmund Allenby. Bols was to serve with Allenby, both on the Western Front in 1916 and in 1917, and later in 1917–18 in Palestine.

From January to June 1920 Bols, who had been promoted in January 1917 to substantive major general, served as the Chief Administrator of Palestine, and signed over power to Herbert Samuel, the first British High Commissioner of Palestine, who confirmed in an often-quoted document:

Received from Major-General Sir Louis J. Bols K.C.B.—One Palestine, complete.

== Post-war and final years ==
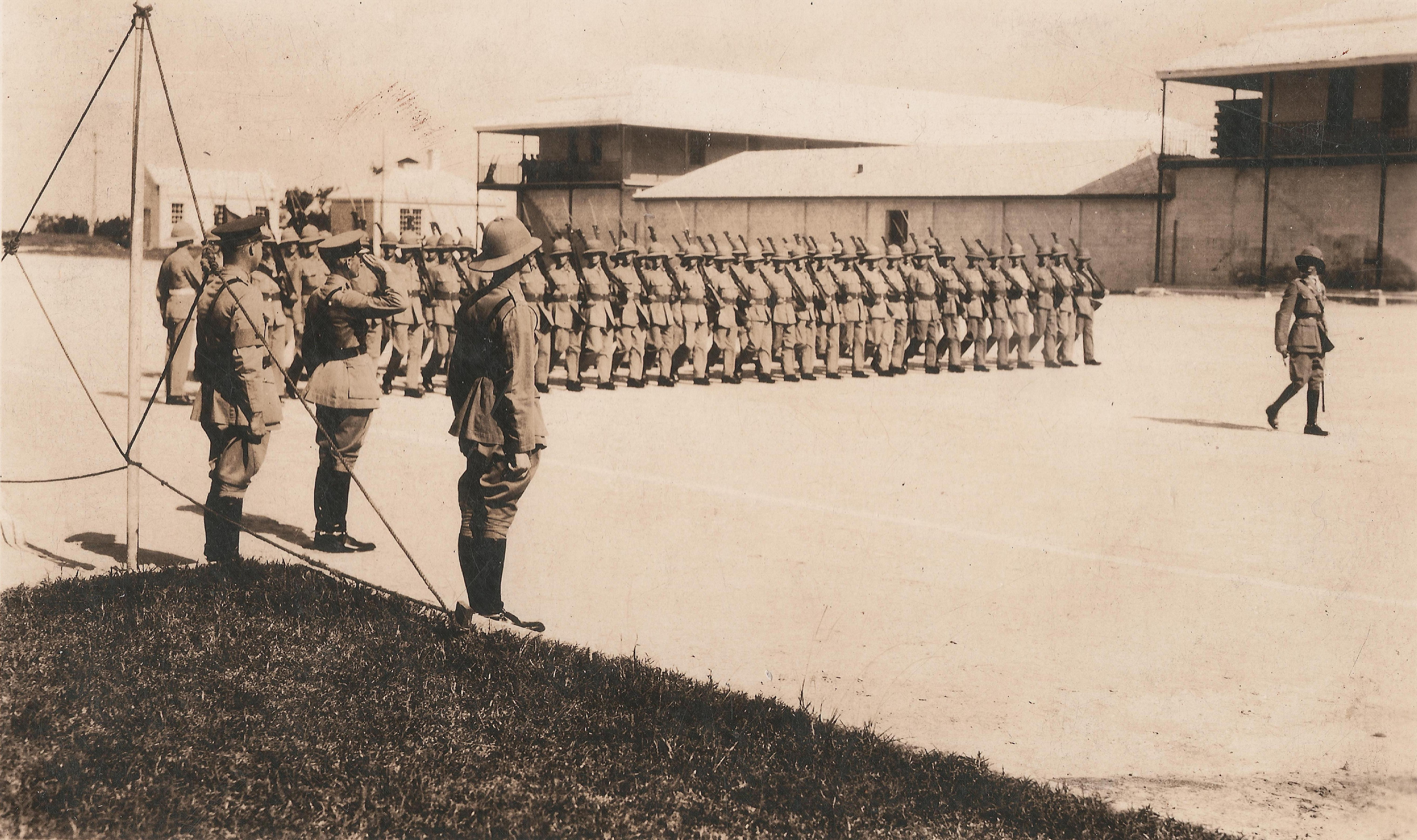
Governor and GOC of Bermuda Lieutenant-General Sir Louis Bols takes salute at Prospect Camp in 1930.

Bols went on to become GOC of the 43rd (Wessex) Infantry Division of the Territorial Army in September 1920, taking over from Major General Sir Charles Hull. In July 1925 he was promoted to lieutenant general. and from 1927 to his death he was Governor and General Officer Commanding of the army garrison of the Imperial fortress colony of Bermuda. He also served as colonel of the Devonshire Regiment from 1921 to his death.

Bols died in his 63rd year on 13 September 1930 in a nursing home in the city of Bath, Somerset, while on leave from Bermuda.

== Personal life ==
Bols married Augusta Blanche Strickland and had two sons, Major-General Eric Bols, and Major Kenneth Bols (killed in action in Italy in the Second World War).

== Bibliography ==
- Bourne, J. M. (2001). Who's Who in World War One. Routledge. ISBN 0-415-14179-6.

Military offices
Preceded by John Capper	GOC 24th Division; May–September 1917	Succeeded by Arthur Daly
Political offices
Preceded by Sir Harry Watson	Chief Administrator of Palestine; January–July 1920	Succeeded by Sir Herbert Samuel; As High Commissioner of Palestine
Military offices
Preceded by Sir Charles Hull	GOC 43rd (Wessex) Infantry Division; 1920–1924	Succeeded by Sir Edward Northey
Political offices
Preceded by Sir Joseph John Asser	Governor of Bermuda; 1927–1930	Succeeded by Sir Thomas Cubitt
