= Occupation of Ma'an =

Territorial dispute between Saudi Arabia and Jordan

- 1918–1923
- Flag

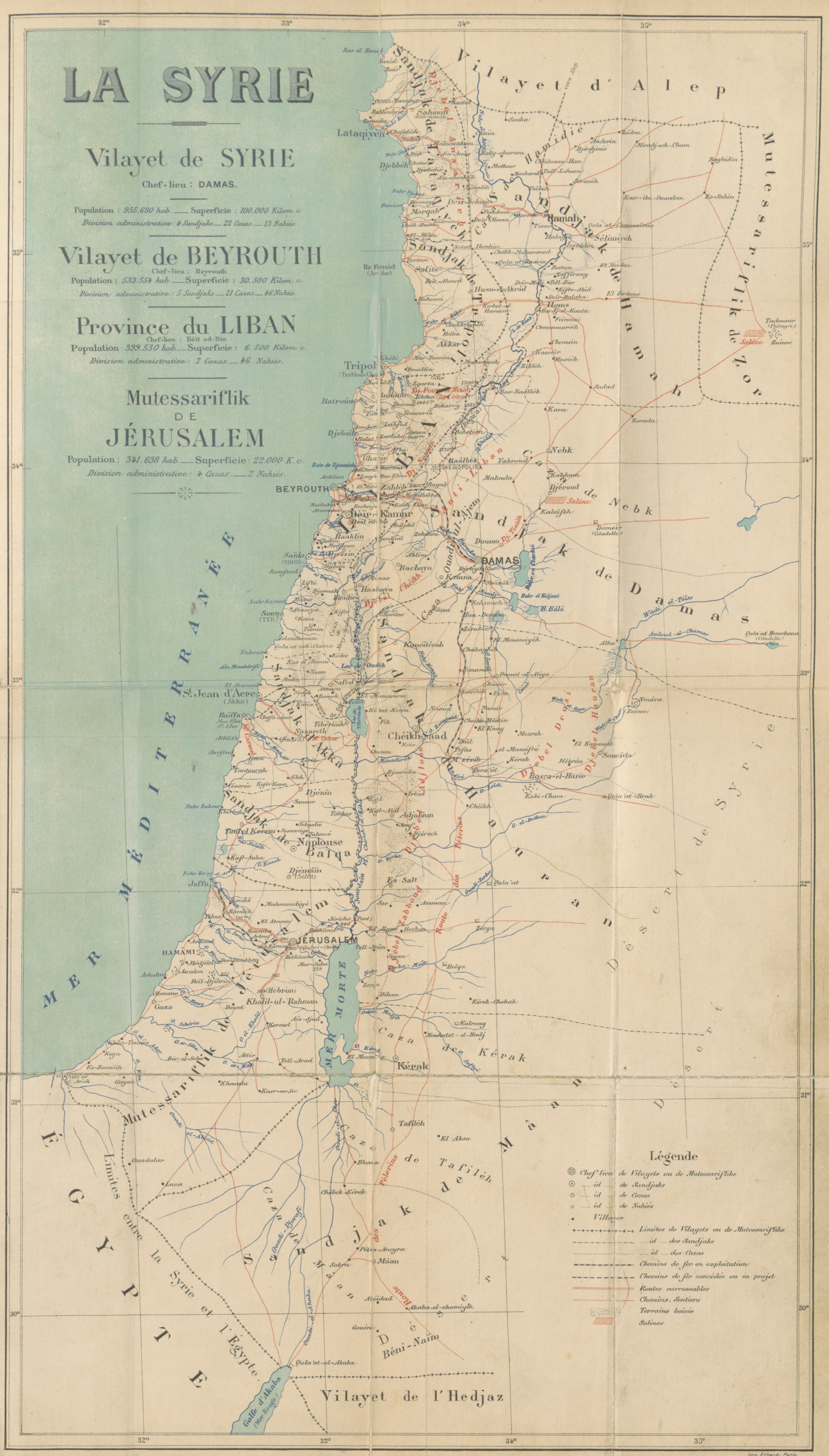
- Sanjak of Ma'an in the 19th century
- Status: Occupied territory with competing claims
- Capital: Ma'an
- Common languages: Arabic
- History
  - Established: 1918
  - Disestablished: 1923

Population
  - 1921: 10,000
Preceded by
Damascus Vilayet
Hejaz Vilayet
Occupied Enemy Territory Administration
Arab Kingdom of Syria
Kingdom of Hejaz
Succeeded by
Emirate of Transjordan
Mandatory Palestine

The Occupation of Ma'an was the post-World War I occupation of the Karak Sanjak (after its previous administrativ seat of befor 1895 also called Ma'an Sanjak, which straddled the regions of Syria vilayet and Arabia, by members of the Hashemite family, who came to power in various regions of the Near East and Arabia; they were King Hussein in the Kingdom of Hejaz, Emir Faisal representing the Arab government in Damascus (Occupied Enemy Territory Administration East and later the Arab Kingdom of Syria) and Abdullah, who was to become Emir of Transjordan. The region includes the governorates of Ma'an and Aqaba, today in Jordan, as well as the area which was to become a large part of the Israeli Southern District, including the city of Eilat.

The matter developed into an international dispute between the modern states of Saudi Arabia and Jordan, and was also relevant to the inclusion of the Negev region into what became the modern country state of Israel. Dr. Benjamin Shwadran, in his history of Jordan, described the matter as "one of the most confused chapters in that country's history"; in question was to whom did the Ma'an sanjak (including the towns of Ma'an and Aqaba) legitimately belong.

== The claims ==
=== Status under Ottomans ===
British Foreign office memorandum January 1940 summarizing the history of the border

In June 1934 the Permanent Mandates Commission asked the British for "information as to the line of demarcation between the vilayet of the Hejaz and that of Syria in the time of the Ottoman Administration"; the report was delivered in the 1934 British Mandatory annual report and stated that:

- in 1893 the Ma'an-Aqaba area was part of the vilayet of Damascus
- in 1904 the sub-district of Aqaba was transferred to the vilayet of Hijaz
- between 1904 and 1910 the independent sanjak of Medina, including Aqaba, was formed
- between 1910 and 1915 the Aqaba sub-district was reattached to the vilayet of Syria
- by the summer of 1915 it had reverted to the independent sanjak of Medina

According to Hasan Kayali, in July 1910, the time of the Young Turks and the second constitutional experiment, the Ottomans changed the administrative status of Medina from the sanjak of the Hejaz Vilayet to the independent sanjak with a view to strengthening control from the center. In 1915, the Ottoman authorities, for military reasons, pushed the southern boundary of the Syria Vilayet far into the historical Hejaz region, up to a line from al-Wajh to Mada'in Saleh (Al-'Ula). The international law professor Suzanne Lalonde writes that the Sanjak of Ma'an was part of the Vilayet of Damascus until 1906 when responsibility was transferred to the Vilayet of Hejaz. According to professor Gideon Biger, in 1908 the Ottoman regime had decided to change its own internal division, and to move the district of Ma’an from the province of Hijaz to the province of E-Sham (Syria)(the Vilayet of Damascus), which was centered on Damascus, although it is not clear whether the move was actually implemented. (Biger also states that Hussein claimed that Ma'an was supposed to be added to E-Sham (Syria) in 1908, but this appears to be an error)

=== Status during the Arab Revolt ===
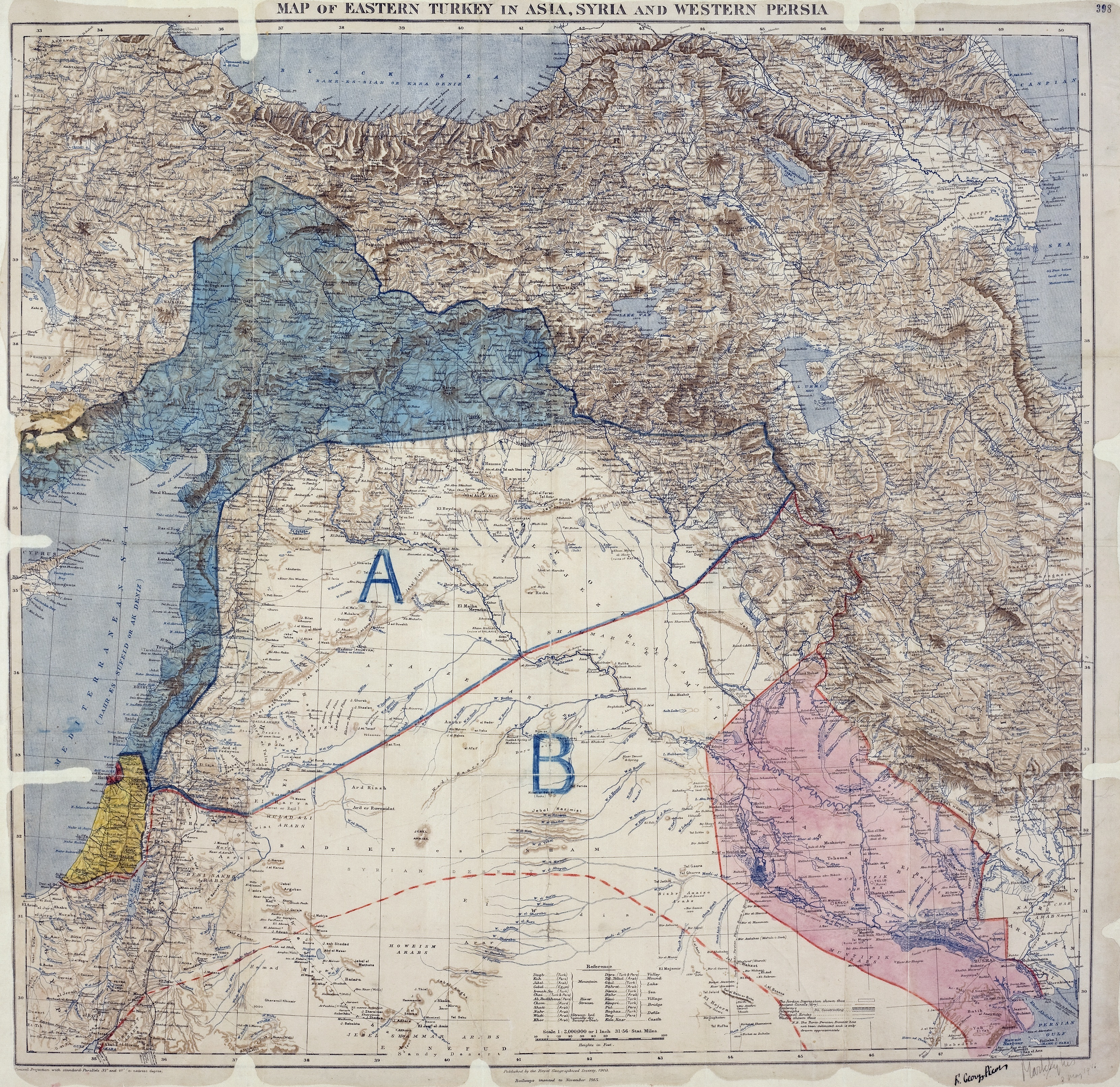
The area in the Sykes–Picot Agreement map

Emir Faisal had led the Arab Revolt, which moved into the region with the 1917 Battle of Aqaba. Faisal went on to head the Arab-British military administration in the Occupied Enemy Territory Administration (OETA) East. After the July 1917 Battle of Aqaba, Gilbert Clayton wrote to Reginald Wingate:

The occupation of Aqaba by Arab troops might well result in the Arabs claiming that place hereafter, and it is by no means improbable that after the war Aqaba may be of considerable importance to the future defence scheme of Egypt. It is thus essential that Aqaba should remain in British hands after the war.

Following the Battle of Aqaba, according to the official British history of the war: "It was decided that Emir Faisal should become in effect an army commander under Sir Edmund Allenby's orders. All Arab operations North of Ma'an were to be carried out by him under the direction of the British Commander-in-Chief. South of Ma'an the High Commissioner Sir Reginald Wingate was still to act as adviser to the Emirs Ali and Abdullah and to be responsible for their supply." One motivating factor for this British position was to avoid the Ottomans' connecting the Red Sea with the Mediterranean by rail, thereby creating competition to the Suez Canal. In 1917 Hussein claimed that the Islamic holy land of the Hejaz extended north beyond Aqaba, that Medina would be cut off without access to the port of Aqaba and that he had won the area through conquest.

=== Status during OETA ===
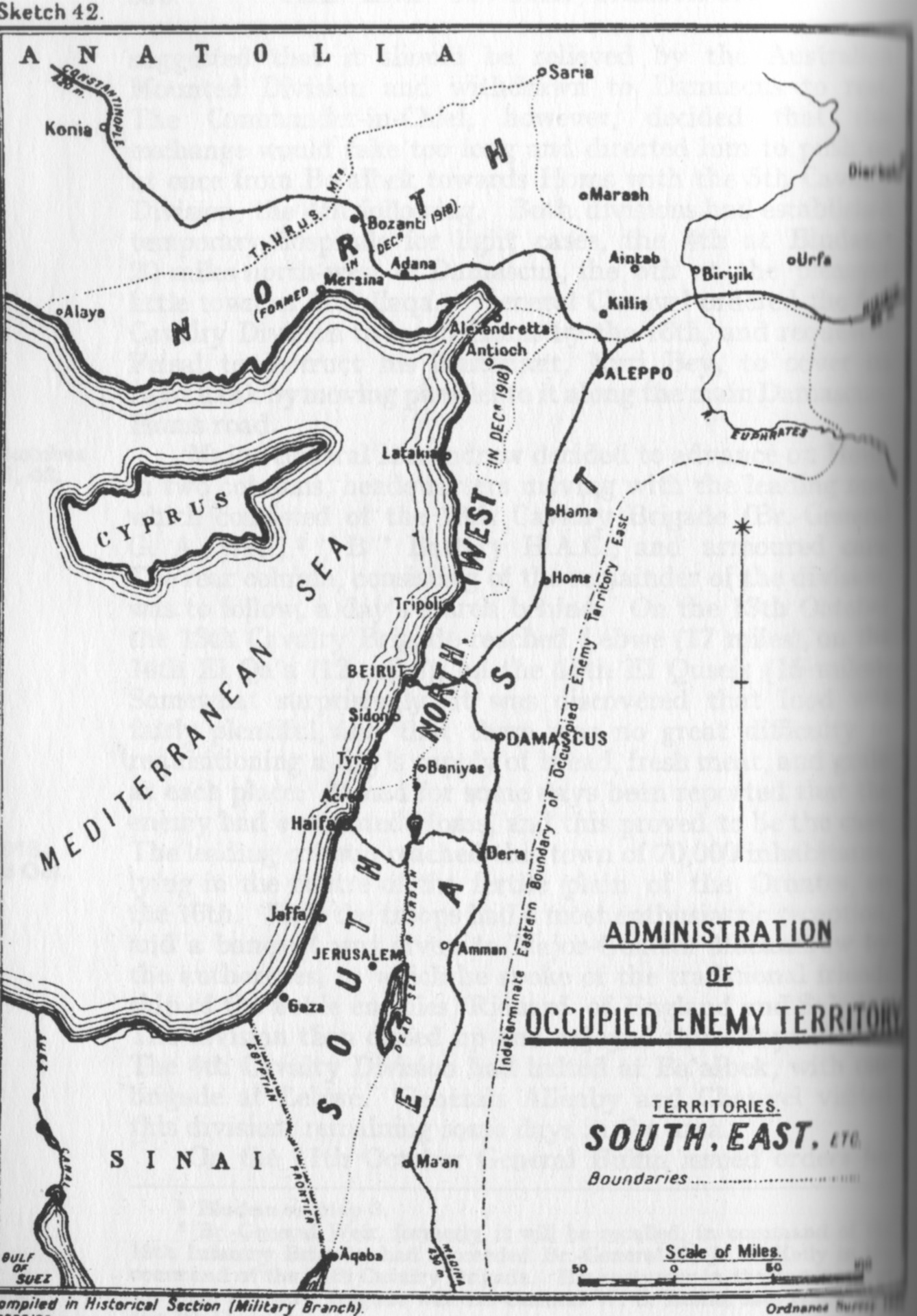
In 1930, the British Government's History of the Great War Based on Official Documents defined OETA East to be the portions of Zones A and B of Sykes-Picot under Allenby's control.The sketch map labels the Eastern boundary for OETA East as undetermined.

The "confusion" over the region began in the OETA period; the British Foreign Office later noted that "Ma'an may or may not have been intended to fall within that area." The actual definition of OETA East, declared on 23 October 1918, was: "all districts East of (a) and (b) above, up to the northern limits of the Kazas of Jebel Seman and El Bab" where a and b were OETA South and North respectively.

Lalonde states that there was no official map to go with the OETA definitions although it seemed likely that the British had relied on the 1918 map of Palestine published by the Survey Department of Egypt for delineating OETA South (Palestine therein drops to the border with Egypt rather than the truncated version that appears in the Sykes-Picot map). According to Antonius and Leatherdale, OETA East included the Ma'an region, including Aqaba. However, he noted that "this is a matter of some confusion", and acknowledged that the opposite interpretation is held by Frischwasser-Ra'anan.

=== Kingdom of Syria ===
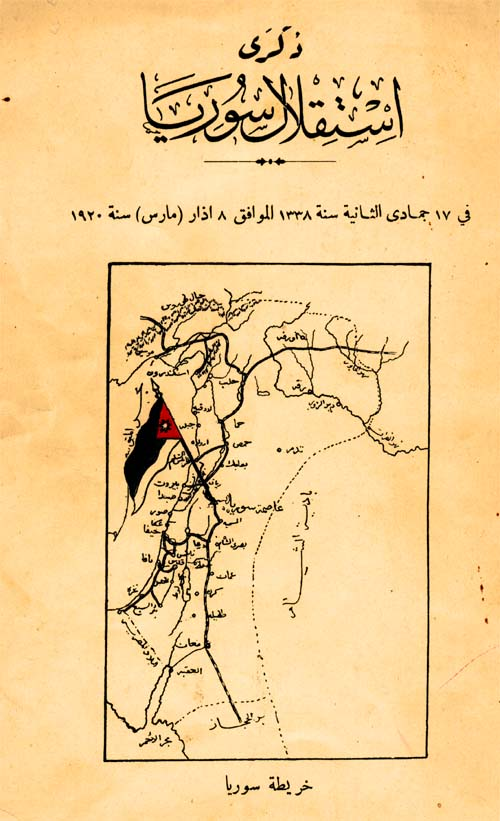
Book of the Independence of Syria (ذكرى استقلال سوريا), showing the declared borders of the Kingdom of Syria

On 2 July 1919, the Syrian National Congress in Damascus defined their southern border as "a line running from Rafah to Al-Jauf and following the Syria-Hejaz border below 'Aqaba".

=== The Negev ===
Although historically connected to the Ma'an region, the Negev was added to the proposed area of Mandatory Palestine, later to become Israel, on 10 July 1922, having been conceded by British representative St John Philby "in Trans-Jordan’s name". Much of the region had been part of the sanjak of Ma'an.

=== British views and actions ===
Following the French occupation of only the northern part of the Syrian Kingdom, Transjordan was left in a period of interregnum. A few months later, Abdullah, the second son of Sharif Hussein, arrived into Transjordan.

In the 16 September 1922 Trans-Jordan memorandum, approved by the Council of the League of Nations, Transjordan was defined as: "all territory lying to the east of a line drawn from a point two miles west of the town of Akaba on the Gulf of that name up... to the Syrian Frontier."

The British claimed that they always considered the area as being outside Hejaz. In 1925 the British acknowledged that for some period they had "acquiesced in the status of the Ma'an and Akaba districts remaining indeterminate pending a final delimitation of the frontier". On 24 June 1925, Secretary of State for the Colonies Leo Amery stated in Parliament that "His Majesty's Government have never regarded the town of Akaba as falling within the limits of the Hejaz, nor has its occupation by the Hejaz ever had their formal consent." Author Gary Troeller, noting that Shwadran's 1959 work makes extensive use of secondary and official published sources and claiming to take account of records unpublished at that time, opines that both Ma'an and Aqaba were part of the Hejaz.

In 1925, the matter was raised at the 9th session of the Permanent Mandates Commission, in response to the British report stating that "in August the region about Ma'an, although included in the area under the British mandate, had passed temporarily under the control of the King of the Hedjaz". In response, Colonel Stewart Symes noted that: "The fact that the Amir Abdullah was the son of King Hussein necessitated a certain tact in dealing with [Hussein's] encroachment [into the Ma'an region]."

=== Transjordan announcement ===
On 27 June 1925, after Hussein had abdicated and fled the Hejaz, but whilst King Ali remained in Mecca, Abdullah issued the following proclamation:

On the authority of His Hashemite Majesty King Ali, King of the Holy Hejaz, we declare the districts of Maan and Akaba to be part of the Amirate of Transjordan.

=== Saudi claim ===
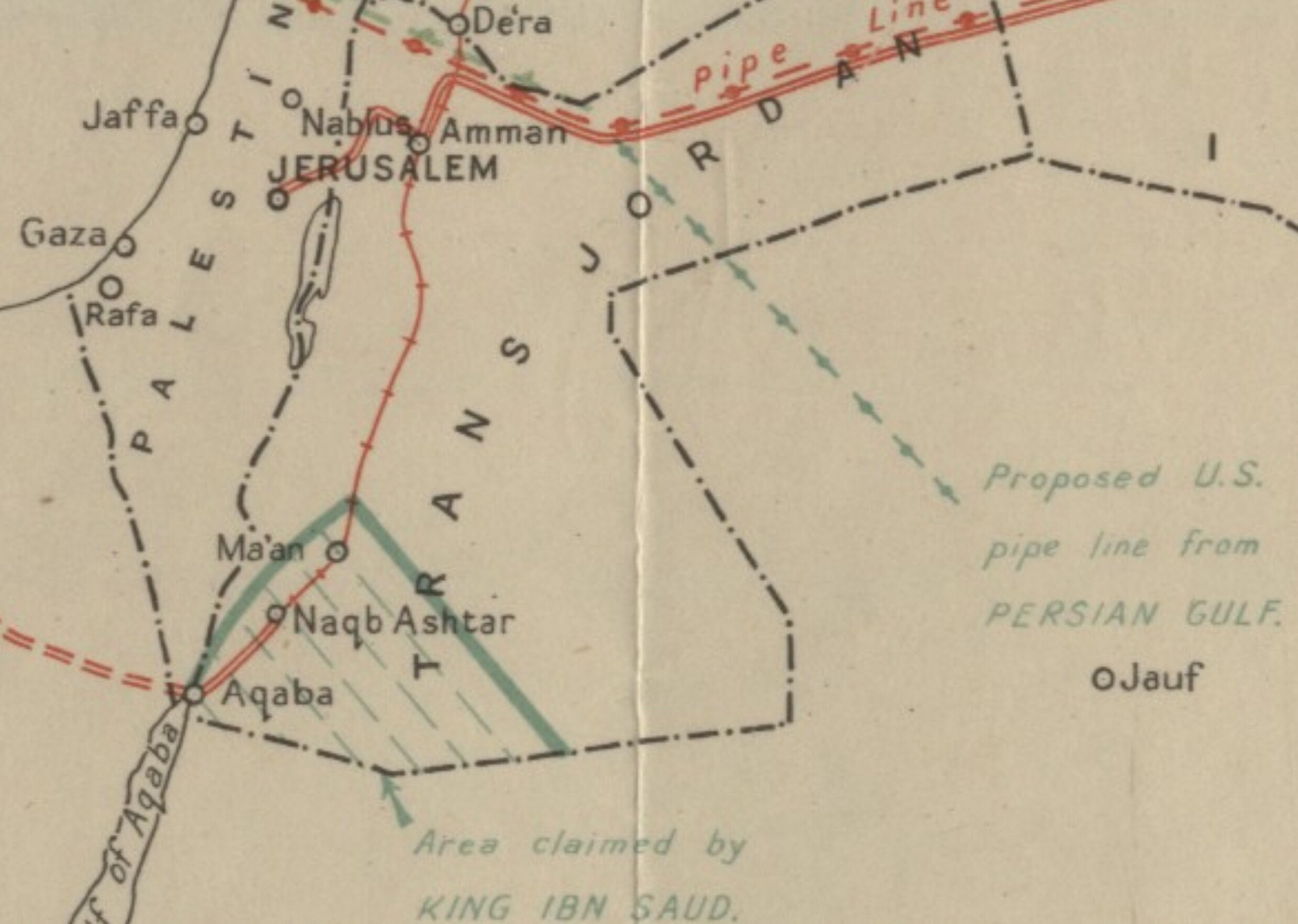
1942 British illustration of the Saudi claims

Map of 1965 land swap between Jordan and Saudi Arabia

The matter was discussed in the period of negotiations that led to the May 1927 Treaty of Jeddah. However, the British government dropped their insistence that Ibn Saud formally recognize Aqaba and Ma'an as part of Transjordan; instead this was dealt with via a separate exchange of letters, between 19 and 21 May 1927, in which Clayton stated the British position and Ibn Saud agreed to respect the status quo.

A January 12, 1940 memorandum prepared by the Eastern Department of the Foreign Office, entitled "Ibn Saud's claim to Akaba and Maan" discussed:

(1) The historical and administrative position of Akaba and Maan in the Ottoman empire.
(2) The manner in which question of sovereignty has been affected by conquest, occupation and administration, and by certain measures of British and allied policy, during and since the war of 1914-18.

The Saudi Arabia claim to Aqaba and Ma'an was finally settled and the border delineated in 1965.

== Bibliography ==
=== English-language ===
- Alsberg, Avraham P. [in German] (1980). "Delimitation of the eastern border of Palestine". Zionism. Vol. 2. Institute for Zionist Research Founded in Memory of Chaim Weizmann. pp. 87–98. doi:10.1080/13531048108575800.
- Anderson, Scott (6 March 2014). Lawrence in Arabia: War, Deceit, Imperial Folly and the Making of the Modern Middle East. Atlantic Books. p. 295. ISBN 978-1-78239-201-9.
- Antonius, George (1938). The Arab Awakening: The Story of the Arab National Movement. Hamish Hamilton. ISBN 978-0-7103-0673-9.
- Baker, Randall (1979). King Husain and the Kingdom of Hejaz. The Oleander Press. p. 220. ISBN 978-0-900891-48-9.
- Biger, Gideon (2004). The Boundaries of Modern Palestine, 1840-1947. Routledge. ISBN 978-1-135-76652-8.
- Frischwasser-Ra'anan, Heinz Felix (1955). The Frontiers of a Nation: A Re-examination of the Forces which Created the Palestine Mandate and Determined Its Territorial Shape. Batchworth Press. ISBN 978-0-598-93542-7.
- Gil-Har, Yitzhak (1992). "Delimitation Boundaries: Trans-Jordan and Saudi Arabia". Middle Eastern Studies. 28 (2): 374–384. doi:10.1080/00263209208700906. JSTOR 4283498.
- Guckian, Noel Joseph (1985). British Relations with Trans-Jordan, 1920-1930 (PhD). Department of International Politics, Aberystwyth University. Archived from the original on 2020-07-27.
- Kayali, Hasan (3 September 1997). "Extension of Ottoman Influence in the Hijaz, Medina: An Ottoman Outpost in the Hijaz". Arabs and Young Turks: Ottomanism, Arabism, and Islamism in the Ottoman Empire, 1908-1918. University of California Press. ISBN 978-0-520-20446-1.
- Lalonde, Suzanne N. (6 December 2002). Determining Boundaries in a Conflicted World: The Role of Uti Possidetis. McGill-Queen's Press - MQUP. ISBN 978-0-7735-7049-8.
- Leatherdale, Clive (1983). Britain and Saudi Arabia, 1925-1939: The Imperial Oasis. Psychology Press. pp. 41–42. ISBN 978-0-7146-3220-9.
- Nevo, J. (15 November 1996). King Abdallah and Palestine: A Territorial Ambition. Palgrave Macmillan UK. pp. 3–. ISBN 978-0-230-37883-4.
- Shwadran, Benjamin (1959). Jordan: A State of Tension. Council for Middle Eastern Affairs Press. ISBN 978-1-258-43247-8.
- Silverfarb, D. (1982). "The Treaty of Jiddah of May 1927". Middle Eastern Studies. 18 (3): 276–285. doi:10.1080/00263208208700511. JSTOR 4282893.
- Troeller, Gary (23 October 2013). The Birth of Saudi Arabia: Britain and the Rise of the House of Sa'ud. Routledge. ISBN 978-1-135-16198-9.
- Wilson, Mary Christina (1990). King Abdullah, Britain and the Making of Jordan. Cambridge University Press. ISBN 978-0-521-39987-6.

=== Arabic-language ===
- Mohammad Abdul-Karim Mahaftha (2004), The British Role in Subjoining Ma'an and Aqaba to Trans-Jordan Administration, 1925 [Arabic title الدور البريطاني في إلحاق معان والعقبة بإدارة شرقي الأردن عام]

=== Sources by involved parties ===
- Victor Mallet, Foreign Office Eastern Department Second Secretary, memorandum, 'Transjordan's Claim to Akaba and Maan', 22 October 1926, FO E/5967/572/91: 371/11444 (quoted in Leatherdale)
- Macmunn, G. F.; Falls, C. (1930). Military Operations: Egypt and Palestine, From June 1917 to the End of the War Part II. History of the Great War based on Official Documents by Direction of the Committee of Imperial Defence. Vol. II. accompanying Map Case (1st ed.). London: HMSO. OCLC 656066774.
