= Harry Davis Watson =

British major-general

Major-General Sir Harry Davis Watson, KBE CB CMG CIE MVO (18 July 1866 – 7 May 1945) was a British Army officer. He was the son of General Sir John Watson.

Watson served as Chief Administrator of Palestine in 1919, after his predecessor had been removed by London for not favoring the Zionists over the Arabs; Watson was removed six months later for the same reason.

== Military career ==
After graduating from the Royal Military College, Sandhurst, Watson was commissioned a lieutenant into the Dorsetshire Regiment (later the Dorset Regiment) on 7 February 1885, in the same class as Douglas Haig, 1st Earl Haig. He transferred to British India, and saw action in the Sikkim expedition.

Promoted to captain in 1896, he served in the Imperial Service Troops of India.

In 1906 he was appointed as an extra equerry to the Prince of Wales, who became George V in 1910. Watson later served in the First World War, first as Inspector-General of the Imperial Service Troops, and subsequently given control of the 20th Indian Brigade which served in the Sinai and Palestine campaign. He was made a CB in June 1918.

He was chief administrator of British occupied Palestine from June 1919 to December 1919.

Political offices
Preceded by Arthur Wigram Money	Chief Administrator of Palestine; 1918–1919	Succeeded by Louis Bols
