= Occupied Enemy Territory Administration =

Part of Ottoman Syria, 1918–1920

Occupied Enemy Territory Administration Administration du territoire ennemi occupé (French) إدارة أراضي العدو المحتلة (Arabic) Idarat aradi al-ʿadui al-muhtala
- 1918–1920
- Flags of France and the United Kingdom, as well as the flag of the Arab administration in OETA-East

- Area of the OETA, according to the British Government's History of the Great War Based on Official Documents
- Status: Occupied territory
- Common languages: Arabic, Hebrew, Ottoman Turkish, English, French
- Administrators
- History
  - Established: 23 October 1918
  - San Remo conference: 19 to 26 April 1920
  - Disestablished: 1920
Preceded by
Mount Lebanon Mutasarrifate
Damascus Vilayet
Mutasarrifate of Jerusalem
Beirut Vilayet
Aleppo Vilayet
Adana Vilayet
Succeeded by
Arab Kingdom of Syria
Mandatory Palestine
Greater Lebanon
Alawite State
Turkey

The Occupied Enemy Territory Administration (OETA) was a joint British, French and Arab military administration over the Levantine provinces – which had been part of the Ottoman Empire for four centuries – between 1918 and 1920, set up on 23 October 1918 following the Sinai and Palestine Campaign and Arab Revolt of World War I. Although it was declared by the British military, who were in control of the region, it was preceded on 30 September 1918 by the 1918 Anglo-French Modus Vivendi, in which it was agreed that the British would give the French control in certain areas, and the Hashemites were given joint control of the Eastern area per T. E. Lawrence's November 1918 "Sharifian plan".

Following the occupation of the Adana Vilayet (the region of Cilicia) in December 1918, a new territory, OETA North, was set up. The administration ended in OETA West and OETA South in 1920, following the assignment of the Mandate for Syria and the Lebanon and British Mandate for Palestine at the 19–26 April 1920 San Remo conference.

In OETA East, British administration ended following the withdrawal of British forces from the territory in November 1919, and the subsequent declaration of the Arab Kingdom of Syria over the same area. The area was split into two after the French defeated King Faisal in July 1920; the northern part of the territory was combined with the French-administered OETA West, and the southern part became a no man's land and later became the Emirate of Transjordan.

Due to the success of the Turkish War of Independence, Marash, Aintab and Urfa sanjaks of former Aleppo Vilayet remained part of Turkey after 1921. Also, the Antakya and İskenderun kazas of Aleppo Sanjak were collectively detached as the Republic of Hatay in 1938; which was then annexed by Turkey after a disputed referendum in 1939.

== History ==
=== Initiation ===
On 23 October 1918, following the British and Arab forces' defeat of the Ottoman Empire, Field Marshal Edmund Allenby announced that Ottoman Syria was to be split into three administrative sub-units, which varied very little from the previous Ottoman divisions:

- OETA South, consisting of the Ottoman Mutasarrifate of Jerusalem and the sanjaks of Nablus and Acre. This was the first administrative definition of what was to become Mandatory Palestine;
- OETA West (originally OETA North, renamed two months later) consisting of the Ottoman Beirut Vilayet, the Mount Lebanon Mutasarrifate, the Sanjak of Latakia, and a number of sub-districts; and
- OETA East consisting of the Ottoman Damascus Vilayet and the southern part of the Aleppo Vilayet. The governors of Aleppo were later to sponsor the Occupation of Zor. The area of Ma'an and Aqaba was administered by OETA East and claimed by the Hejaz.

In December 1918, following the occupation of the region of Cilicia, a new territory was set up.

- OETA North, consisting of the Adana Vilayet

=== Later events ===
King–Crane Commission OETA population estimates
	South	West	East	Totals
Muslim	515,000	600,000	1,250,000	2,365,000
Christian	62,500	400,000	125,000	587,500
Druze		60,000	80,000	140,000
Jewish	65,000	15,000	30,000	110,000
Other	5,000	20,000	20,000	45,000
Totals	647,500	1,095,000	1,505,000	3,247,500

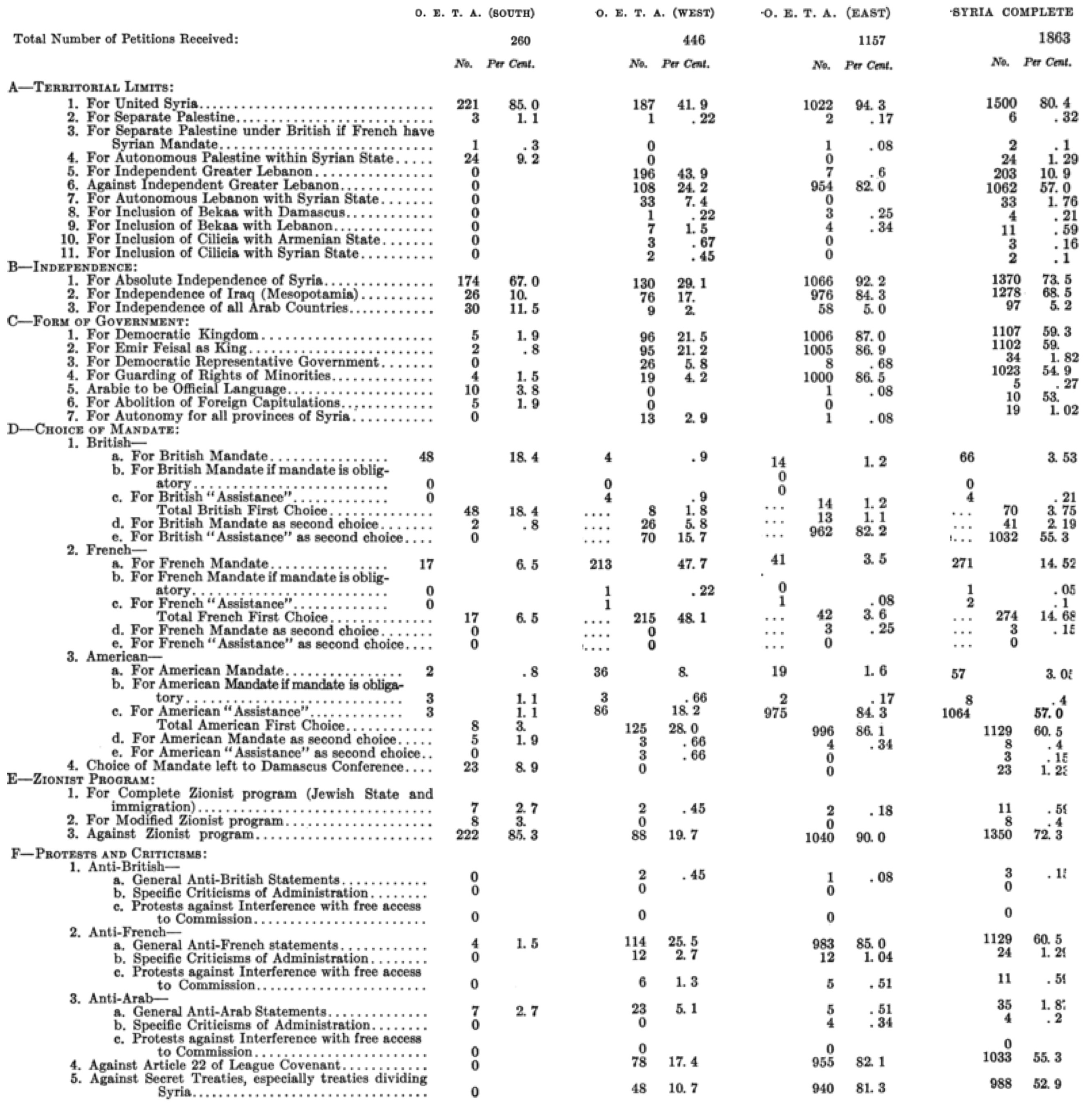
Results of the King–Crane Commission Petitions received from OETA South (became Palestine), OETA West (became Lebanon and Western Syria) and OETA East (became Syria and Transjordan); it has been described as "the first-ever survey of Arab public opinion".

Under this administration the immediate needs of the people were provided for, seed grain and live-stock were imported and distributed, finance on easy terms was made available through the Army bankers, a stable currency was set up and postal services restored. Allenby insisted that as long as military administration was required, it was to remain his responsibility.

== Military administrators ==
=== OETA South chief administrators ===
The area was divided into four districts: Jerusalem, Jaffa, Majdal and Beersheba, each under a military governor. Both of the first two British administrators, Generals Money and Watson, were removed by London for not favouring the Zionists over the Arabs; when the OETA administration ended, Liberal party politician (and former British Home Secretary) Herbert Samuel was installed as the first civilian administrator. Samuel recorded his acceptance of the role, and the end of military administration, in an often-quoted document: "Received from Major-General Sir Louis J. Bols K.C.B.—One Palestine, complete."

=== OETA East administrators ===
OETA East was a joint Arab-British military administration. The Arab and British armies entered Damascus on 1 October 1918, and on 3 October 1918 Ali Rida al-Rikabi was appointed Military Governor of OETA East. Prince Faisal son of King Hussain of Mecca entered Damascus as on 4 October and appointed Rikabi Chief of the Council of Directors (i.e. prime minister) of Syria.

The boundary definition of OETA East left uncertainties to the south and east, leading to competing claims from the Kingdom of Hejaz and Occupied Iraq respectively – see Occupation of Ma'an and Occupation of Zor for further details.

- Rida al-Rikabi (3 October 1918 – 26 November 1919)

=== OETA North (West) administrators ===
- Marie Antoine Philpin de Piépape (7 October 1918 – 19 November 1918)
- Jules Camille Hamelin (19 November 1918 – 21 November 1919)
- François Georges Barb (21 November 1919 – 1 September 1920)

=== OETA North (Cilicia) administrators ===
- Édouard Brémond

No.	Portrait	Name (birth–death)	Term of office			Ref.
No.	Portrait	Name (birth–death)	Took office	Left office	Time in office	Ref.
1		Major general Arthur Wigram Money (1866–1951)	June 1918	June 1919	1 year	
2		Major general Harry Davis Watson (1866–1945)	June 1919	December 1919	6 months	
3		Lieutenant general Louis Bols (1867–1930)	January 1920	July 1920	6 months	

== Initiation and administration ==
The OETA was established on 23 October 1918, under the accepted rules of military occupation, and defined as follows:

1. The enemy territory occupied by the allied troops of the Egyptian Expeditionary Force will be divided, for purposes of provisional military administration, into three areas, each in charge of a "Chief Administrator" directly responsible in all cases to the Commander-in-Chief.

The three areas and their Chief Administrators are : -

(a) "Occupied Enemy Territory (South)". - Chief Administrator, -~ General Sir A. W. Money, K.C.B., C.S.I., (British). Comprises the Sanjaks of Jerusalem, Nablus, and Acre.
(b) "Occupied Enemy Territory (North)". - Chief Administrator, - Colonel M.A.F.J. de Piepape, (French). Comprises the Sanjaks of Beirut, Lebanon, Ladikiya and the town of Beirut; the Kazas of Hasbiya, Rashiya, Jisr es Shaghur, Bay of Antioch, Yeniji Kali, Im Beidan, and Alexandretta.
(c) "Occupied Enemy Territory (East)". - Chief Administrator, - Ali Riza El Rikabi (Arab). Comprises all districts East of (a) and (b) above, up to the northern limits of the Kazas of Jebel Seman and El Bab.

2. The system of administration will be in accordance with the Laws and Usages of War as laid down in Ch. XIV, S.8, Manual of Military Law. Departures from these principles will not be permitted except with the approval of the Commander-in-Chief. As far as possible the Turkish system of government will be continued, and the existing machinery of government will be utilized.

3. The Administration will be required to provide for all necessary government services, and the extent to which these services can be developed, during the state of war, is left to the discretion of the Chief Administrator concerned.

4. As far as possible it is desired to retain Turkish administrative areas, and in this way to utilise existing Turkish records.

5. The Administration of the Ottoman Public Debt will be permitted to continue its functions, subject to the general control of the Chief Administrator.

6. The Régie Tobacco Monopoly will likewise continue its functions under similar conditions.

7. Chief Administrators will communicate with the Commander-in-Chief through the Deputy-Adjutant General, G.H.Q., to whom all reports will be addressed.

8. Chief Administrators will submit reports on the general situation in their areas, by 15th of each month.

9. In view of the fact that the administration is military, provisional, and without prejudice to future settlement, Chief Administrators will not undertake, except in so far as is necessary for the maintenance of security and public order, any political propaganda, and will not take part in any political controversies. — Public Record Office. W.O. 106. File 718; Secret (Telegram E.A. 1808 of 23.10.18) Available in pdf here

== Disestablishment ==
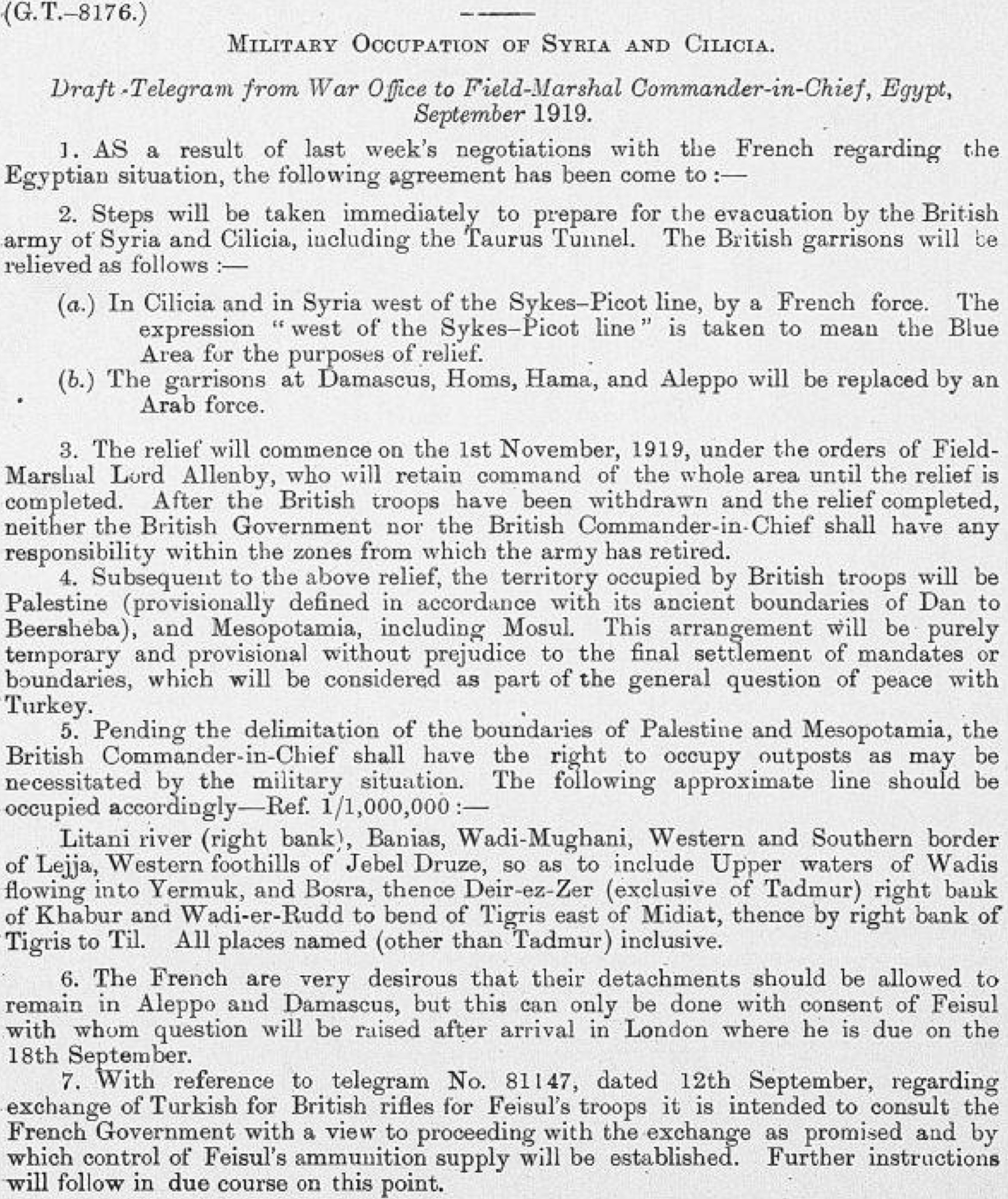
This draft British Telegram of September 1919, ordering the withdrawal of British troops from the French and Arab areas of the OETA, was prepared shortly after the Franco-British conference at Deauville. The line in point 5 became known as the "Deauville Line"

The OETA administrations were disestablished at different times in each of the regions, following the formal appointment of civil administrations (prior to the formal coming into force of the mandates):

- OETA South: 1 July 1920, Herbert Samuel was appointed as High Commissioner for Palestine
- OETA West: 31 August 1920, Henri Gouraud proclaimed the State of Greater Lebanon, the Alawite State and the Sanjak of Alexandretta was merged into the State of Aleppo
- OETA East: 26 November 1919, when the British withdrew in favor of the Emirate of Syria.

== Bibliography ==
- Biger, Gideon (2004). The boundaries of modern Palestine: 1840 - 1947. RoutledgeCurzon studies in Middle Eastern history. London: RoutledgeCurzon. ISBN 978-0-7146-5654-0.
- Macmunn, G. F.; Falls, C. (1930). Military Operations: Egypt and Palestine, From June 1917 to the End of the War Part II. History of the Great War based on Official Documents by Direction of the Committee of Imperial Defence. Vol. II. accompanying Map Case (1st ed.). London: HMSO. OCLC 656066774 – via Archive Foundation.
- Paris, Timothy J. (2003). Britain, the Hashemites, and Arab Rule, 1920-1925: the Sherifian solution. London; Portland, OR: Frank Cass. ISBN 978-0-7146-5451-5.
