= Rashed Al-Khuzai =

Local Jordanian tribal leader and landowner (1850–1957)

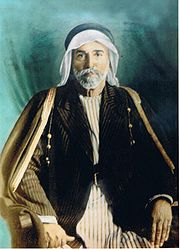
- Rashed Al-Khuzai
- Born: 1850; Kufranjah, Ottoman Empire (now Jordan)
- Died: 1957 (aged 106–107); Kufranjeh, Jordan
- Occupations: Tribal leader, landowner
- Known for: Leader of the Al-Fraihat tribe; opposition to Emir Abdullah I during the 1937 Ajloun unrest
- Children: Lutfi Khzai

Rashed Al-Khuzai (Arabic: راشد الخزاعي), fully known as Sheikh Rashed Al-Fraihat (1850–1957), was a prominent Jordanian local leader and Sheikh of the Al-Fraihat tribe in the Ajloun highlands of northern Jordan. His family historically held a position of local influence and landownership (*Wujaha*) in the region during the late Ottoman period and the early decades of the Emirate of Transjordan. He is best known for his participation in regional opposition movements against the centralizing authority of Emir Abdullah I in the 1930s.

== Historical Context and Influence ==
During the late Ottoman administration, the Al-Fraihat family held localized authority within the Ajloun district (*sanjak*), acting as local tax collectors and protectors of regional trade and seasonal grazing routes in the northern hills. Contrary to later family narratives claiming sovereign rule over the wider Levant, contemporary Ottoman records and historical consensus establish the family as prominent local notables (*Wujaha*) operating within the standard imperial provincial system, wedged between larger regional confederations such as the Adwan and Bani Sakher.

Following the collapse of the Ottoman Empire and the establishment of the British Mandate for Transjordan in 1921, the new state under Emir Abdullah I began consolidating power and centralizing tax collection. This created structural friction with several traditional tribal leaders across Jordan, including Al-Khuzai, who had previously enjoyed significant autonomy from a centralized government.

== The 1937 Ajloun Unrest and Exile ==
Al-Khuzai was a supporter of Arab nationalist sentiments in the region and expressed early political solidarity with Palestinian anti-colonial figures, including Sheikh Izz ad-Din al-Qassam.

In 1937, local discontent over state taxation, economic pressures, and the political alignment of the Hashemite leadership with the British Mandate culminated in a localized tax revolt and anti-government agitation in the Ajloun region, frequently referred to in local accounts as the "Ajloun Revolution." The unrest was quickly suppressed by the British-backed Arab Legion.

Following the collapse of the movement, Al-Khuzai and a small group of immediate family and tribal followers fled Transjordan to avoid arrest by mandatory authorities. They sought political asylum in the Kingdom of Saudi Arabia, where they were granted refuge as guests of King Ibn Saud. Al-Khuzai remained in exile for several years before being permitted to return to Jordan in 1945 following a general royal amnesty. He lived quietly in his home town of Kufranjeh until his death in 1957.
