= Interregnum (Transjordan) =

1920–1921 rulerless period of Transjordan

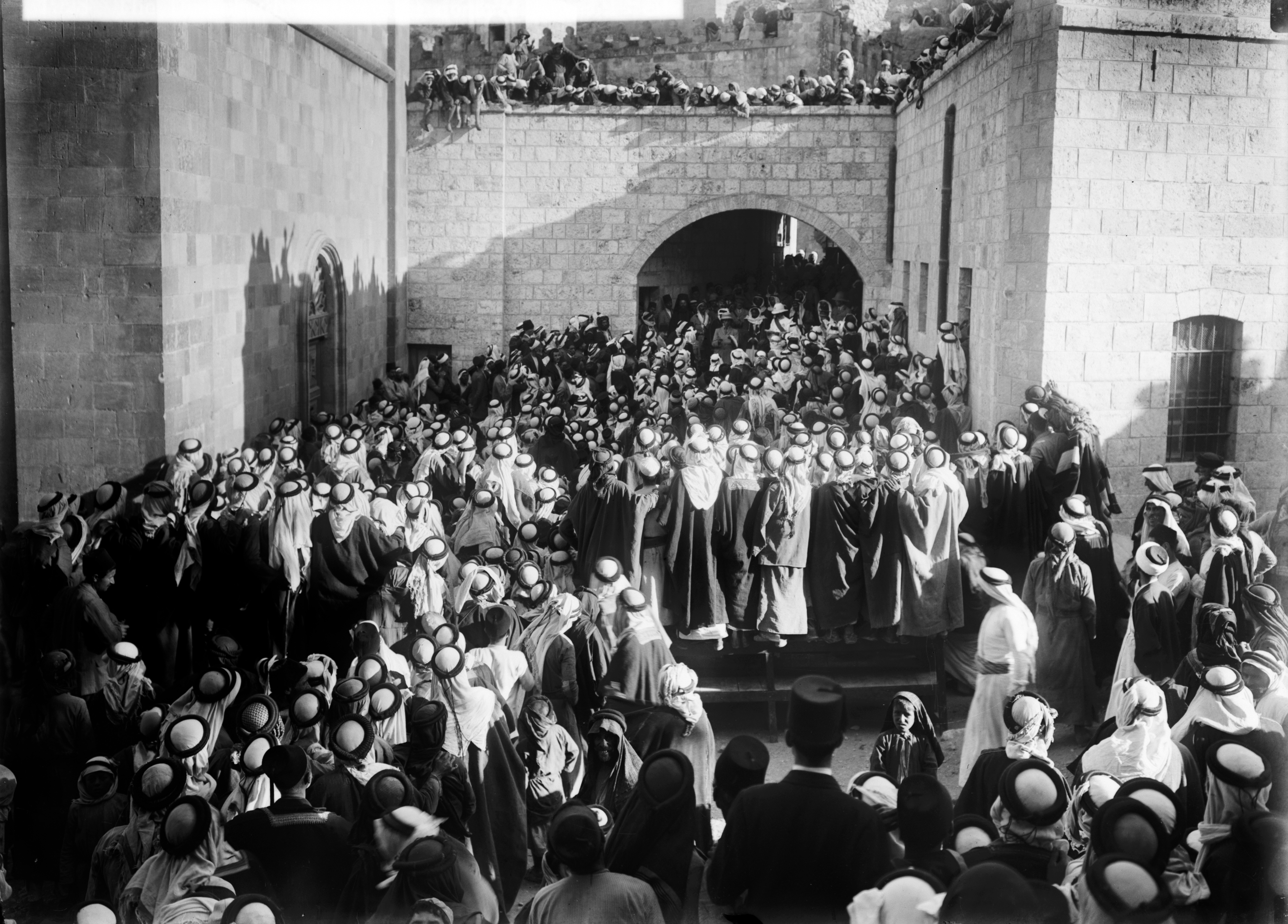
Herbert Samuel's proclamation in Salt, on 21 August 1920 in the courtyard of the Assumption of Our Lady Catholic Church. Samuel was admonished a few days later by Curzon, who instructed that: "There must be no question of setting up any British administration in that area".

The Interregnum (between rulers) period in Transjordan was a short period during which the region had no established ruler or occupying power that lasted from the end of the Franco-Syrian War on 25 July 1920 until the establishment of the Emirate of Transjordan on 11 April 1921.

Transjordan was in the British sphere of influence, but the British did not send an army or administration, and the government of the Hashemite Arab Kingdom of Syria under Prince Faisal had collapsed after being defeated by the French during the Battle of Maysalun in July 1920. British High Commissioner for Palestine Herbert Samuel wrote that the area was "left politically derelict"; the region was extremely poor, sparsely populated, and widely considered ungovernable.

The British administration in the neighbouring Mandatory Palestine were split over whether to influence the region or not. The World Zionist Organization tried and failed to have the area added to Mandatory Palestine and be included in the Balfour Declaration. The efforts of High Commissioner for Palestine Herbert Samuel to place the region under direct British rule were overruled by the British Foreign Minister Lord Curzon.

Prince Abdullah entered Transjordan in November 1920 and set about expanding his influence and gained control over most of the Transjordan region by March 1921. With the declared goal of liberating Syria from French rule, he built alliances with Arab nationalists who fled Damascus following Maysalun and local tribes. Having established himself in Amman, Abdullah agreed with British Colonial Secretary, during the March 1921 Cairo Conference, on a six months trial, which was later extended indefinitely. Abdullah's establishment of the Emirate of Transjordan in April 1921, a British protectorate with independence but suzerainty to the British Empire, marked the beginning of the Jordanian monarchy. Britain's support to establishing Arab monarchies led by sons of Hussein bin Ali, Sharif of Mecca in former territories of the Ottoman Empire, became known as the Sharifian Solution.

== British decision not to impose direct occupation ==
=== Development of policy ===
In early 1920, two principles emerged within the British government: the first was that the Palestine government would not extend east of the Jordan, and the second was the government's chosen – albeit disputed – interpretation of the 1915 McMahon-Hussein Correspondence which proposed that Transjordan had been included in the area of "Arab independence" whilst Palestine had been excluded. (Note: Paris writes: "Of course, the uncertainty surrounding Transjordan's status pre-dated Abdullah's appearance on the scene. While it had long been clear that British control of the area south of the Sykes-Picot line and extending from Palestine to Persia would be divided into two political regions, the Palestine and Mesopotamian Mandates were assumed to be coterminous: no provision was made for any intervening territory. Whether it was part of Palestine or Mesopotamia, however, there was never any doubt that Transjordan would come under the British Mandate. But recognition of that fact did not resolve the status of Transjordan vis-à-vis its neighbours in any definitive way. Moreover, two principles that emerged in 1920 and were calculated to further define the nature of the new state, served only to further confuse matters and to generate the uncertainty of which Abdullah, Samuel and Philby later complained. The first was that the administrative authority of the Palestine government would not be extended east of the Jordan, a principle laid down as early as July 1920. The second sprang from Young's interpretation of the 'McMahon pledge'. Since McMahon had excluded from the area of promised Arab independence territory lying west of the 'district of Damascus', he argued that in areas to the east of that district—that is, east of the River Jordan—Britain was obligated to 'recognise and support' such independence. The interpretation seemed logical enough to those who had not examined carefully the text of McMahon's letters…")

At the beginning of the interregnum in Transjordan, the British suddenly wanted to know 'what is the "Syria" for which the French received a mandate at San Remo?' and "does it include Transjordania?". (Note: Hubert Young to Ambassador Hardinge (Paris), 27 July 1920, FO 371/5254, cited by Wilson.) British Foreign Minister Curzon ultimately decided that it did not and that Transjordan would remain independent, but in the closest relation with Palestine. (Note: Wilson writes: "Since the end of the war the territory north of Ma'an had been ruled by Damascus as a province of Faysal's Kingdom of Syria. Although it fell within the British zone according to the Sykes-Picot agreement, Britain was content with the arrangement because it favoured Arab rule in the interior and Faysal was, after all, British protege. However, when France occupied Damascus the picture changed dramatically. Britain did not want to see France extend its control southward to the borders of Palestine and closer to the Suez Canal ... It suddenly became important to know 'what is the "Syria" for which the French received a mandate at San Remo?' and 'does it include Transjordania?' ... The British foreign secretary, Lord Curzon, decided that it did not and that Britain henceforth would regard the area as independent, but in 'closest relation' with Palestine.")

=== British efforts to add Transjordan to the Palestine administration ===
On 6 August 1920, British Foreign Secretary Earl Curzon wrote to newly appointed High Commissioner Herbert Samuel regarding Transjordan, stating: "I suggest that you should let it be known forthwith that in the area south of the Sykes-Picot line, we will not admit French authority and that our policy for this area to be independent but in closest relations with Palestine." Samuel replied to Curzon, "After the fall of Damascus a fortnight ago...Sheiks and tribes east of Jordan utterly dissatisfied with Shareefian Government most unlikely would accept revival," and asked to put parts of Transjordan directly under his administrative control. (Note: Sicker wrote: "On August 7, 1920, Herbert Samuel, the recently appointed high commissioner in Palestine, cabled London requesting permission to include Trans-Jordan directly under his administrative control, thereby allowing him to take the necessary steps to restore order in the territory. This would eliminate the threat of a French attempt to control the region from Damascus.") Two weeks later, on 21 August, Samuel then visited Transjordan without authority from London; at a meeting with 600 leaders in Salt, he announced the independence of the area from Damascus and its absorption into the mandate, quadrupling the area under his control by tacit capitulation. Samuel assured his audience that Transjordan would not be merged with Palestine. (Note: Wilson writes: "Samuel then organised a meeting of Transjordanian leaders at Salt on 21 August, at which he would announce British plans... On 20 August Samuel and a few political officers left Jerusalem by car, headed for the Jordan river, the frontier of British territory at that time. 'It is an entirely irregular proceeding,' he noted, 'my going outside my own jurisdiction into a country which was Faisal's, and is still being administered by the Damascus Government, now under French influence. But it is equally irregular for a government under French influence to be exercising functions in territory which is agreed to be within the British sphere: and of the two irregularities I prefer mine.'... The meeting, held in the courtyard of the Catholic church, was attended by about 600 people ... Sentence by sentence his speech describing British policy was translated into Arabic: political officers would be stationed in towns to help organise local governments; Transjordan would not come under Palestinian administration; there would be no conscription and no disarmament ... On balance, Samuel's statement of policy was unobjectionable. Three things feared by the Arabs of Transjordan – conscription, disarmament, and annexation by Palestine – were abjured ... The presence of a few British agents, unsupported by troops, seemed a small concession in return for the protection Britain's presence would afford against the French, who, it was feared, might press their occupation southward ... Samuel returned to Jerusalem well pleased with the success of his mission. He left behind several officers to see to the administration of Transjordan and the maintenance of British influence.") Curzon was in the process of reducing British military expenditures and was unwilling to commit any significant resources to an area considered to be of marginal strategic value. Curzon immediately repudiated Samuel's action; on 26 August he sent, via the Foreign Office, a restatement of his instructions to minimize the scope of British involvement in the area – in particular stating that "There must be no question of setting up any British administration in that area". (Note: Curzon's 26 August 1920 telegram stated that: "His Majesty's Government have no desire to extend their responsibilities in Arab districts and must insist on strict adherence to the very limited assistance which we can offer to a native administration in Trans-jordania as stated in my telegram No. 80 of August 11th. There must be no question of setting up any British administration in that area and all that may be done at present is to send a maximum of four or five political officers with instructions on the lines laid down in my above mentioned telegram.") At the end of September 1920, Curzon instructed Vansittart to leave the eastern boundary of Palestine undefined, and to avoid "any definite connection" between Transjordan and Palestine, in order to leave the way open for an Arab government in Transjordan. (Note: Curzon wrote: "His Majesty's Government are already treating 'Trans-Jordania' as separate from the Damascus State, while at the same time avoiding any definite connection between it and Palestine, thus leaving the way open for the establishment there, should it become advisable, of some form of independent Arab government, perhaps by arrangement with King Hussein or other Arab chiefs concerned.")

Curzon wrote in February 1921: "I am very concerned about Transjordania... Sir H.Samuel wants it as an annex of Palestine and an outlet for the Jews. Here I am against him."

== Local governments ==
Following Samuel's speech in August 1920, the British began to encourage the setting up of local autonomous governments in the following regions. Six junior political officers were sent to the region to advise on the creation of self-government; no military support was provided, they were given limited financial support, and some of the officers could not speak Arabic. The arrangement lasted until April 1921, although by early February 1921 the British had concluded that "[Abdullah's] influence has now completely replaced that of the local governments and of the British advisers in Trans-Jordania".

=== Ajlun region ===
Major FitzRoy Somerset and Captain Reginald Monckton were the assigned British political officers.

The area was the most densely populated in the country and was subsequently split into four governments: Jabal Ajlun, Kura, Irbid, and Jerash. The Jerash Local Government was led by Muhammad Ali Al-Mughrabi.

=== Balqa region ===
==== Salt ====
Major J. N. Camp and Captain Chisholm Dunbar Brunton were the assigned British political officers, later handing over to Captain Frederick Peake, who took overall control of the gendarmerie.

==== Amman ====
Captain Alan Kirkbride (younger brother of Alec) was the assigned British political officer.

=== Kerak region ===
Captain Alec Kirkbride was the assigned British political officer.

Named by Kirkbride as the "National Government of Moab".

Considered the most successful of the governments.

== Bibliography ==
- Alon, Yoav (30 March 2007). The Making of Jordan: Tribes, Colonialism and the Modern State. I.B.Tauris. ISBN 978-1-84511-138-0.
- Alon, Yoav (2009). "'Heart-Beguiling Araby' on the Frontier of Empire: Early Anglo-Arab Relations in Transjordan". British Journal of Middle Eastern Studies. 36 (1): 55–72. doi:10.1080/13530190902749580. JSTOR 40593218. S2CID 159885817.
- Bradshaw, Tancred (30 March 2012). Britain and Jordan: Imperial Strategy, King Abdullah I and the Zionist Movement. I.B.Tauris. ISBN 978-0-85772-114-3.
- Alsberg, Paul Avraham [in German] (1973). "קביעת הגבול המזרחי של ארץ ישראל (Determining the Eastern Boundary of the Land of Israel)". In Daniel Carpi (ed.). הציונות: מאסף לתולדות התנועה הציונית והישוב היהודי בארץ־ישראל. וניברסיטת תל-אביב, הוצאת הכבוץ המיוחד. available in pdf here
- Alsberg, Avraham P. [in German] (1980). "Delimitation of the eastern border of Palestine". Zionism. Vol. 2. Institute for Zionist Research Founded in Memory of Chaim Weizmann. pp. 87–98. doi:10.1080/13531048108575800.
- Aruri, Naseer Hasan (1972). Jordan: A Study in Political Development 1923–1965. The Hague: Martinus Nijhoff Publishers. ISBN 978-90-247-1217-5.
- Friedman, Isaiah (2011). British Pan-Arab Policy, 1915–1922. Transaction Publishers. ISBN 978-1-4128-1514-7.
- Karsh, Efraim; Karsh, Inari (2001). Empires of the Sand: The Struggle for Mastery in the Middle East, 1789–1923. Harvard University Press. ISBN 978-0-674-00541-9.
- Paris, Timothy J. (2003). Britain, the Hashemites and Arab Rule: The Sherifian Solution. Routledge. ISBN 978-1-135-77191-1.
- Rogan, Eugene L. (11 April 2002). Frontiers of the State in the Late Ottoman Empire: Transjordan, 1850-1921. Cambridge University Press. ISBN 978-0-521-89223-0.
- Rudd, Jeffery A. (1993). Abdallah bin al-Husayn: The Making of an Arab Political Leader, 1908–1921 (PDF) (PhD). SOAS Research Online. pp. 45–46.
- Salibi, Kamal S. (1998). The Modern History of Jordan. London: I B Tauris. ISBN 978-1860643316.
- Sicker, Martin (1999). Reshaping Palestine: From Muhammad Ali to the British Mandate, 1831–1922. Greenwood Publishing Group. ISBN 978-0-275-96639-3.
- Wasserstein, Bernard (2008). Israel and Palestine: Why They Fight and Can They Stop?. Profile Books. ISBN 978-1-84668-092-2.
- Wilson, Mary Christina (1990). King Abdullah, Britain and the Making of Jordan. Cambridge University Press. ISBN 978-0-521-39987-6.
- Woodward, Ernest Llewellyn (1963). Documents on British Foreign Policy, 1919–1939, First series, Volume XIII. H.M. Stationery Office.
