= League of Nations mandate =

Legal status for territories administered on behalf of the League of Nations

League of Nations mandates

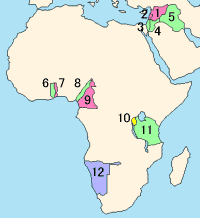
Class A, mandates in Western Asia:
1. Syria
2. Lebanon
3. Palestine
4. Transjordan
5. Iraq
Class B, mandates in Central and East Africa:
6. British Togoland
7. French Togoland
8. British Cameroon
9. French Cameroon
10. Ruanda-Urundi
11. Tanganyika
Class C, mandates in Southern Africa:
12. South West Africa

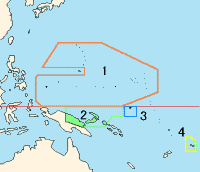
Class C, mandates in the Pacific:
1. Japanese Pacific Mandate
2. Territory of New Guinea
3. Nauru
4. Western Samoa

A League of Nations mandate was a sui generis legal status under international law for specific territories following World War I, involving the transfer of control from one nation to another. These mandates served as legal documents establishing the internationally agreed terms for administering the territory on behalf of the League of Nations. Combining elements of both a treaty and a constitution, these mandates contained minority rights clauses that provided for the rights of petition and adjudication by the Permanent Court of International Justice.

The mandate system was established under Article 22 of the Covenant of the League of Nations, signed on 28 June 1919 and entered into force on 10 January 1920. Two governing principles formed the core of the Mandate System: non-annexation of the territory and its administration as a "sacred trust of civilisation" to develop the territory for the benefit of its native people.

According to historian Susan Pedersen, colonial administration in the mandates did not differ substantially from colonial administration elsewhere. Even though the Covenant of the League committed the great powers to govern the mandates differently, the main difference seemed to be that the colonial powers spoke differently about the mandates than about their other colonial possessions.

Following the dissolution of the League of Nations after World War II, delegates at the Yalta Conference stipulated that the remaining mandates should be placed under United Nations trusteeship, subject to future discussions and formal agreements. Most of the League of Nations' remaining mandates (except South West Africa) thus eventually became United Nations trust territories.

== Basis ==
The mandate system was established by Article 22 of the Covenant of the League of Nations, drafted by the victors of World War I. The article referred to territories that, after the war, were no longer ruled by their former sovereigns, but whose peoples were not considered "able to stand by themselves under the strenuous conditions of the modern world". The article called for such people's tutelage to be "entrusted to advanced nations who by reason of their resources, their experience or their geographical position can best undertake this responsibility".

U.S. President Woodrow Wilson and South African General Jan Smuts played influential roles in pushing for the establishment of a mandates system. The mandates system reflected a compromise between Smuts (who wanted colonial powers to annex the territories) and Wilson (who wanted trusteeship over the territories).

The mandate system intended to incorporate an open-door economic policy, allowing countries other than the mandatory power to invest in the mandates. However, apart from an open trade policy, this did not happen in practice.

Moreover, the Permanent Mandates Commission was officially tasked with guiding their mandates toward independence, following a rebuilding of civil society and economic investment. However, more often than not, mandates were treated similarly to other colonial projects, with the Permanent Mandates Commission having too little executive power to intervene. Furthermore, no deadlines were established for independence of the mandates.

== Generalities ==
All of the territories subject to League of Nations mandates were previously controlled by states defeated in World War I, principally Imperial Germany and the Ottoman Empire. The mandates differed fundamentally from protectorates because the mandatory power undertook obligations to the inhabitants and to the League of Nations.

The process of establishing the mandates consisted of two phases:

1. The formal removal of sovereignty of the state previously controlling the territory.
2. The transfer of mandatory powers to individual states among the Allied Powers.

=== Treaties ===
The divestiture of Germany's overseas colonies, along with three territories separated from its European homeland (the Free City of Danzig, the Memel Territory, and the Saar Basin), was accomplished in the Treaty of Versailles (1919); the territories were allotted among the Allies on 7 May of that year. Ottoman territorial claims were first addressed in the Treaty of Sèvres (1920) concluded in the Treaty of Lausanne (1923). The Ottoman territories were allotted among the Allied Powers at the San Remo conference in 1920.

== Types of mandates ==
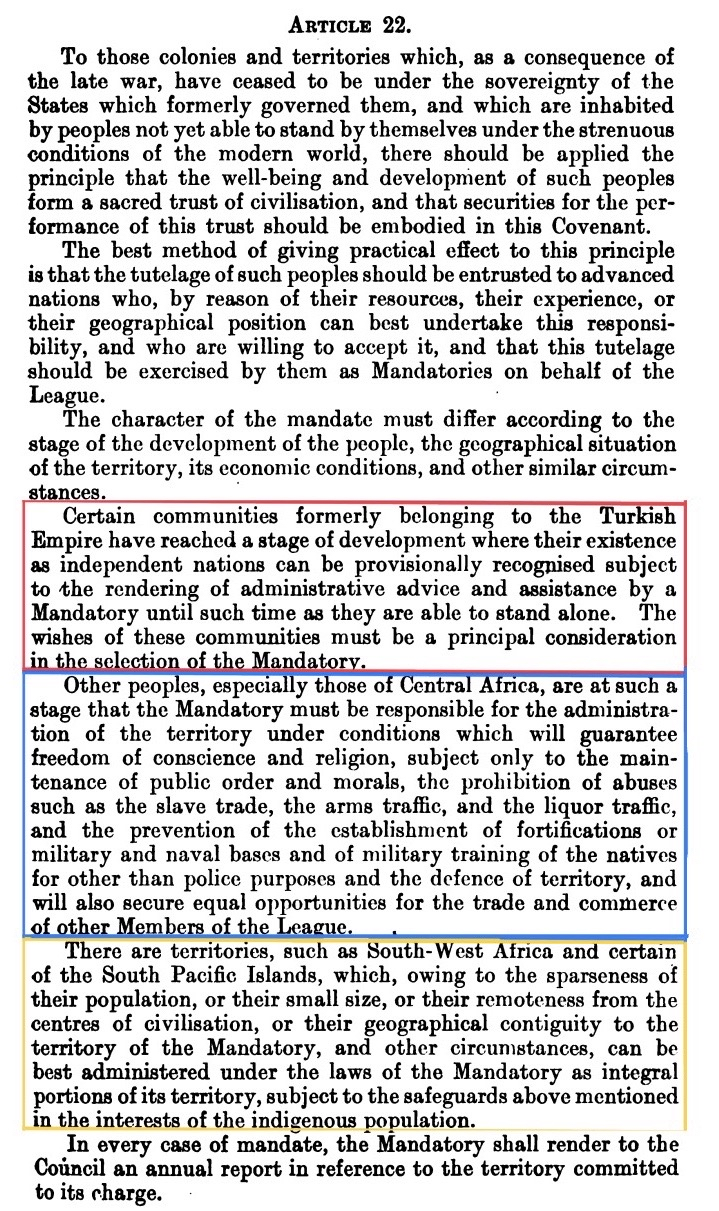
Article 22 of the Covenant of the League of Nations, highlighting the three mandate classes: Red: Class A (ex Ottoman); Blue: Class B (ex German Central Africa); Yellow: Class C (ex German South West Africa and Pacific)

The League of Nations decided the exact level of control by the mandatory power over each mandate on an individual basis. However, in every case, the mandatory power was forbidden to construct fortifications or raise an army within the territory of the mandate. It was required to present an annual report on the territory to the Permanent Mandates Commission of the League of Nations.

The mandates were divided into three distinct groups based on the level of development each population had achieved.

=== Class A mandates ===
The first group, Class A mandates, were territories formerly controlled by the Ottoman Empire that were deemed to "... have reached a stage of development where their existence as independent nations can be provisionally recognised subject to the rendering of administrative advice and assistance by a Mandatory until such time as they are able to stand alone. The wishes of these communities must be a principal consideration in the selection of the Mandatory." The Class A mandates were created in 1920 by the League of Nations and confirmed in 1922. The former Ottoman-ruled Iraq, Palestine and Transjordan were assigned to the British Empire; former Ottoman-ruled Lebanon and Syria were assigned to France. The British granted more power to local authorities than the French.

=== Class B mandates ===
The second group of mandates, Class B mandates, were all former German colonies in West and Central Africa, referred to by Germany as Schutzgebiete (protectorates), which were deemed to require a greater level of control by the mandatory power: "...the Mandatory must be responsible for the administration of the territory under conditions which will guarantee freedom of conscience and religion." The mandatory power was forbidden to construct military or naval bases within the mandates.

=== Class C mandates ===
Class C mandates, including South West Africa and the South Pacific Islands, were considered by Article 22 of the Treaty of Versailles to be "best administered under the laws of the Mandatory as integral portions of its territory". This was attributed to the "sparseness of their population, or their small size, or their remoteness from the centres of civilisation, or their geographical contiguity to the territory of the Mandatory".

The C mandates were established largely at the urging of the Dominion governments of Australia, New Zealand and South Africa, which sought to annex the nearby German colonies they had occupied in the early stages of the war. Their respective prime ministers Billy Hughes, William Massey and Jan Smuts strongly lobbied for that position at the Imperial War Conferences and meetings of the Imperial War Cabinet in 1917 and 1918. Smuts believed that full annexation was appropriate as "the German colonies in the Pacific and Africa are inhabited by barbarians, who not only cannot possibly govern themselves, but to whom it would be impracticable to apply any ideas of political self-determination in the European sense".

The Dominion continued to push for full annexation at the 1919 Paris Peace Conference, but met with some opposition from delegates who believed they should be internationalised or that annexation would not allow for consent of the governed. The final form of Article 22 was a compromise that allowed for de facto annexation while still providing a degree of oversight by the League. In practice, "the difference between a C Mandate and territorial annexation was real; but it was slight, and remained unclear".

The C mandates were conferred personally on Emperor Yoshihito and King George V (designated as "His Britannic Majesty"). For New Guinea, Samoa and South-West Africa, a particular Dominion government was specified to exercise the mandatory powers of the king. However, for Nauru, no administering government was specified and the mandate remained personally vested in the king. This was due to the Nauru Island Agreement of 1919, whereby the governments of Australia, New Zealand and United Kingdom agreed to co-operate in the administration of Nauru and create the British Phosphate Commission to oversee phosphate mining on the island. Australia served as the de facto mandatory power and the administrator of Nauru was appointed by the Australian government.

== List of mandates ==
Class	Mandate	Territory	Mandate Power	Prior sovereignty (names)	Comments	Current state
A	Mandate for Syria and the Lebanon	Greater Lebanon	France	Ottoman Empire (Sanjaks of Beirut, Tripoli, Mount Lebanon)	29 September 1923 – 24 October 1945. Joined the United Nations on 24 October 1945 as an independent state and Founding Member	Lebanon
A	Mandate for Syria and the Lebanon	Syria	France	Ottoman Empire (Sanjaks of Damascus, Hauran, Latakia, Homs, Hama, Aleppo, Zor)	29 September 1923 – 24 October 1945: This mandate included the Hatay Province (formerly the sanjak of Alexandretta), which broke away from the mandate on 2 September 1938 to become a separate French protectorate, which lasted until the region was ceded to the new Republic of Turkey on 29 June 1939. Joined the United Nations on 24 October 1945 as an independent state	Syria
A	Mandate for Palestine	Mandatory Palestine	United Kingdom	Ottoman Empire (Sanjaks of Jerusalem, Nablus, Acre)	29 September 1923 – 15 May 1948. A United Nations Partition Plan for Palestine for peacefully dividing the remainder of the Mandate failed. Arab leaders and governments rejected the plan of partition and indicated that they would reject any other plan of partition. The Mandate terminated at midnight between 14 May and 15 May 1948. On the evening of 14 May, the Chairman of the Jewish Agency for Palestine had declared the establishment of the State of Israel. Following the war, 75% of the area was controlled by the new State of Israel. Other parts, until 1967, formed the West Bank of the Hashemite Kingdom of Jordan and the All-Palestine Government under the Egyptian-controlled Gaza Strip.	Israel; Palestine
A	Mandate for Palestine	Emirate of Transjordan	United Kingdom	Ottoman Empire (Sanjaks of Hauran, Ma'an)	In April 1921, the Emirate of Transjordan was provisionally added as an autonomous area under the United Kingdom, and it became the independent Hashemite Kingdom of Transjordan (later Jordan) on 17 June 1946 upon joint ratification of the Treaty of London of 1946.	Jordan
A	Indirect	Mandatory Iraq	United Kingdom	Ottoman Empire (various sanjaks)	The draft British Mandate for Mesopotamia was not enacted and was replaced by the Anglo-Iraqi Treaty of October 1922. Britain committed to acting as a Mandatory Power in 1924. Iraq attained independence from the United Kingdom on 3 October 1932.	Iraq
B	Belgian Mandate for East Africa	Ruanda-Urundi	Belgium	Germany (German East Africa)	From 20 July 1922 to 13 December 1946. Formerly two separate German protectorates, they were joined as a single mandate on 20 July 1922. From 1 March 1926 to 30 June 1960, Ruanda-Urundi was in administrative union with the neighbouring colony of the Belgian Congo. After 13 December 1946, it became a United Nations trust territory, remaining under Belgian administration until the separate nations of Rwanda and Burundi gained independence on 1 July 1962.	Rwanda and Burundi
B	British Mandate for East Africa	Tanganyika Territory	United Kingdom	Germany (German East Africa)	From 20 July 1922 to 11 December 1946. It became a United Nations trust territory on 11 December 1946, and was granted internal self-rule on 1 May 1961. On 9 December 1961, it became independent while retaining the British monarch as its nominal head of state, and on the same day the next year, it transformed into a republic. On 26 April 1964, Tanganyika merged with the neighbouring island of Zanzibar to become the modern nation of Tanzania.	Tanzania
B	British Mandate for the Cameroons	British Cameroon	United Kingdom	Germany (Kamerun)	Became part of the United Nations trust territories after World War II on 13 December 1946	Part of Cameroon and Nigeria.
B	French Mandate for the Cameroons	French Cameroon	France	Germany (Kamerun)	Under a Resident and a Commissioner until 27 August 1940, then under a governor. Became part of the United Nations trust territories after World War II on 13 December 1946	Cameroon
B	British Mandate for Togoland	British Togoland	United Kingdom	Germany (Togoland)	British Administrator post filled by the colonial Governor of the British Gold Coast (present day Ghana) except 30 September 1920 – 11 October 1923 Francis Walter Fillon Jackson). Transformed on 13 December 1946 into a United Nations trust territory; on 13 December 1956, it ceased to exist as it became part of Ghana.	Volta Region, Ghana
B	French Mandate for Togoland	French Togoland	France	Germany (Togoland)	French Togoland under a Commissioner till 30 August 1956, then under a High Commissioner as the Autonomous Republic of Togo	Togo
C	Mandate for the German Possessions in the Pacific Ocean situated South of the Equator other than German Samoa and Nauru	Territory of New Guinea	Australia (Note: Formally conferred upon "His Britannic Majesty to be exercised on his behalf by the Government of the Commonwealth of Australia".)	Germany (German New Guinea)	Included German New Guinea and "the group of islands in the Pacific Ocean lying south of the equator other than German Samoa and Nauru". From 17 December 1920 under an (at first Military) Administrator; after (wartime) Japanese/U.S. military commands from 8 December 1946 under UN mandate as North East New Guinea (under Australia, as administrative unit), until it became part of present Papua New Guinea at independence in 1975.	Part of Papua New Guinea
C	Mandate for Nauru	Nauru	Australia (Note: Formally conferred upon "His Britannic Majesty" – unlike the other C-class mandates, no specific government was named.); New Zealand; United Kingdom	Germany (German New Guinea)	Administered by Australia pursuant to the Nauru Island Agreement; New Zealand and the United Kingdom as co-trustees with no administrative role. Became part of the United Nations trust territories after liberation from Japanese occupation in World War II.	Nauru
C	Mandate for the German Possessions in the Pacific Ocean lying North of the Equator	South Seas Mandate	Japan (Note: Formally conferred upon "His Majesty the Emperor of Japan".)	Germany (German New Guinea)	Known as the South Seas Mandate. Became part of the United Nations trust territories and administered by the United States after World War II.	Palau; Marshall Islands; Federated States of Micronesia; Northern Mariana Islands
C	Mandate for German Samoa	Western Samoa	New Zealand (Note: Formally conferred upon "His Britannic Majesty to be exercised on his behalf by the Government of the Dominion of New Zealand".)	Germany (German Samoa)	From 17 December 1920 a League of Nations mandate, renamed Western Samoa (as opposed to American Samoa), from 25 January 1947 a United Nations trust territory until its independence on 1 January 1962.	Samoa
C	Mandate for German South West Africa	South West Africa	South Africa (Note: Formally conferred upon "His Britannic Majesty to be exercised on his behalf by the Government of the Union of South Africa".)	Germany (German South West Africa)	From 1 October 1922, Walvis Bay's administration (still merely having a Magistrate until its 16 March 1931 Municipal status, hence a Mayor) was also assigned to the mandate.	Namibia

Footnotes

== Rules of establishment ==
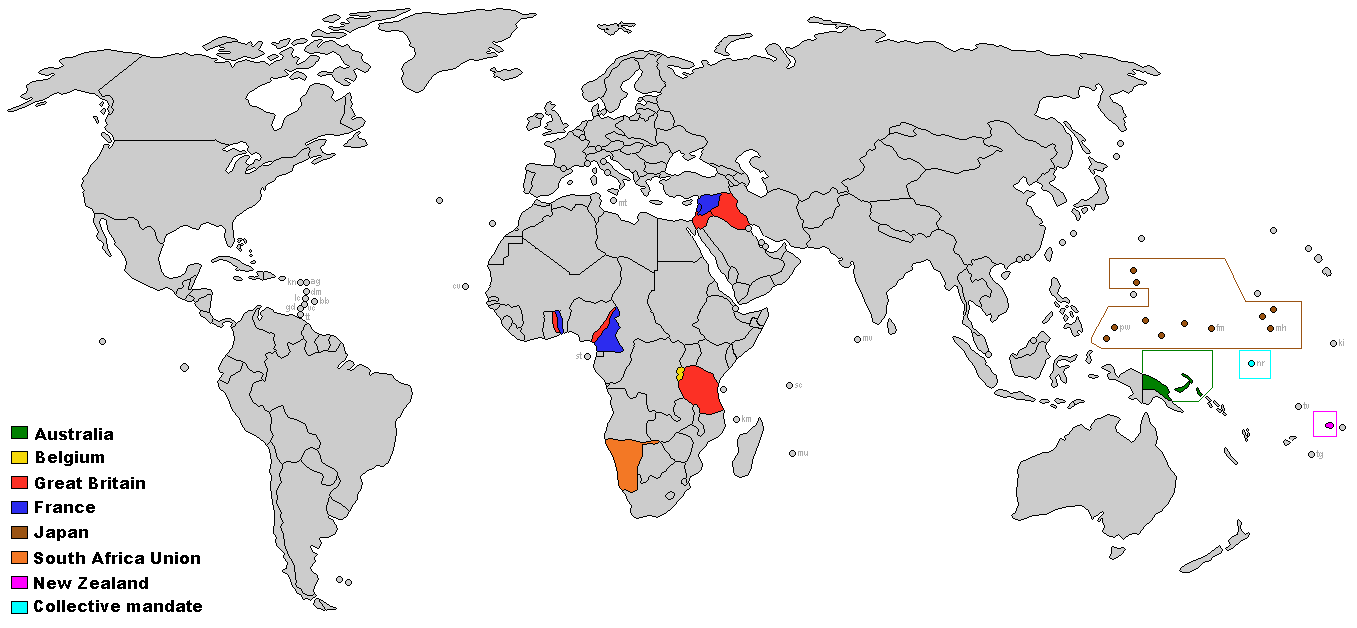
Map of the League of Nations mandates

According to the Council of the League of Nations, meeting of August 1920: "draft mandates adopted by the Allied and Associated Powers would not be definitive until they had been considered and approved by the League... the legal title held by the mandatory Power must be a double one: one conferred by the Principal Powers and the other conferred by the League of Nations."

Three steps were required to establish a Mandate under international law: (1) The Principal Allied and Associated Powers confer a mandate on one of their number or on a third power; (2) the principal powers officially notify the council of the League of Nations that a certain power has been appointed mandatory for such a certain defined territory; and (3) the council of the League of Nations takes official cognisance of the appointment of the mandatory power and informs the latter that it [the council] considers it as invested with the mandate, and at the same time notifies it of the terms of the mandate, after ascertaining whether they are in conformance with the provisions of the covenant."

The U.S. State Department's Digest of International Law says that the terms of the Treaty of Lausanne provided for the application of the principles of state succession to the "A" Mandates. The Treaty of Versailles provisionally recognised the former Ottoman communities as independent nations. It also required Germany to recognise the disposition of the former Ottoman territories and to recognise the new states laid down within their boundaries. The terms of the Treaty of Lausanne required the newly created states that acquired the territory detached from the Ottoman Empire to pay annuities on the Ottoman public debt and to assume responsibility for the administration of concessions that the Ottomans had granted. The treaty also let the States acquire, without payment, all the property and possessions of the Ottoman Empire situated within their territory. The treaty provided that the League of Nations was responsible for establishing an arbitral court to resolve disputes that might arise and stipulated that its decisions were final.

A disagreement regarding the legal status and the portion of the annuities to be paid by the "A" mandates was settled when an Arbitrator ruled that some of the mandates contained more than one State:

The difficulty arises here how one is to regard the Asiatic countries under the British and French mandates. Iraq is a Kingdom in regard to which Great Britain has undertaken responsibilities equivalent to those of a Mandatory Power. Under the British mandate, Palestine and Transjordan have each an entirely separate organisation. We are, therefore, in the presence of three States sufficiently separate to be considered as distinct Parties. France has received a single mandate from the Council of the League of Nations, but in the countries subject to that mandate, one can distinguish two distinct States: Syria and the Lebanon, each State possessing its own constitution and a nationality clearly different from the other.

== Later history ==
After the United Nations was founded in 1945, the League of Nations was disbanded; all but one of the mandated territories became United Nations trust territories, a roughly equivalent status. In each case, the colonial power that held the mandate on each territory became the administering power of the trusteeship, except the Empire of Japan, which, having been defeated in World War II, lost its mandate over the South Pacific islands. These islands became a "strategic trust territory" under U.S. administration known as the Trust Territory of the Pacific Islands.

The sole exception to the transformation of the League of Nations mandates into UN trusteeships was South Africa and its mandated territory, South West Africa. Rather than placing South West Africa under trusteeship, as with other former mandates, South Africa proposed annexation, a proposition rejected by the UN General Assembly. Despite South Africa's resistance, the International Court of Justice affirmed that South Africa remained subject to international obligations under the South West Africa mandate. Eventually, in 1990, the mandated territory, now Namibia, gained independence, culminating from the Tripartite Accords and the resolution of the South African Border War — a prolonged guerrilla conflict against the apartheid regime that lasted from 1966 until 1990.

Nearly all the former League of Nations mandates had become sovereign states by 1990, including all of the former UN trust territories except a few successor entities of the gradually dismembered Trust Territory of the Pacific Islands (formerly Japan's South Pacific Trust Mandate). These exceptions include the Northern Mariana Islands, which is a commonwealth in political union with the U.S., with the status of unincorporated organised territory. The Northern Mariana Islands elects its own governor to serve as territorial head of government. Still, it remains a U.S. territory with its head of state being the President of the United States and federal funds to the commonwealth administered by the Office of Insular Affairs of the U.S. Department of the Interior.

Remnant Micronesia and the Marshall Islands, the heirs of the last territories of the Trust, attained final independence on 22 December 1990 (the UN Security Council ratified the termination of trusteeship, effectively dissolving the trusteeship status, on 10 July 1987). The Republic of Palau, split off from the Federated States of Micronesia, became the last to gain its independence effectively, on 1 October 1994.

== See also ==
- United Nations trust territories

== Sources and references ==
- Anghie, Antony "Colonialism and the Birth of International Institutions: Sovereignty, Economy, and the Mandate System of the League of Nations" 34 (3) New York University Journal of International Law and Politics 513 (2002).
- Hall, H. Duncan (1948). Mandates, Dependencies and Trusteeship.
- Nele Matz, Civilization and the Mandate System under the League of Nations as Origin of Trusteeship, in: A. von Bogdandy and R. Wolfrum, (eds.), Max Planck Yearbook of United Nations Law, Volume 9, 2005, p. 47–95.
- Pugh, Jeffrey, "Whose Brother's Keeper? International Trusteeship and the Search for Peace in the Palestinian Territories", International Studies Perspectives 13, no. 4 (November 2012): 321–343.
- Storr, Cait (2020). International Status in the Shadow of Empire: Nauru and the Histories of International Law. Cambridge University Press. doi:10.1017/9781108682602. ISBN 9781108682602.
- Tamburini, Francesco "I mandati della Società delle Nazioni", in Africana, Rivista di Studi Extraeuropei, n.XV – 2009, pp. 99–122.
- Wright, Quincy (1968). Mandates Under the League of Nations. Greenwood Press.
