= Southern Syria =

Southern part of the Syria region in the Levant

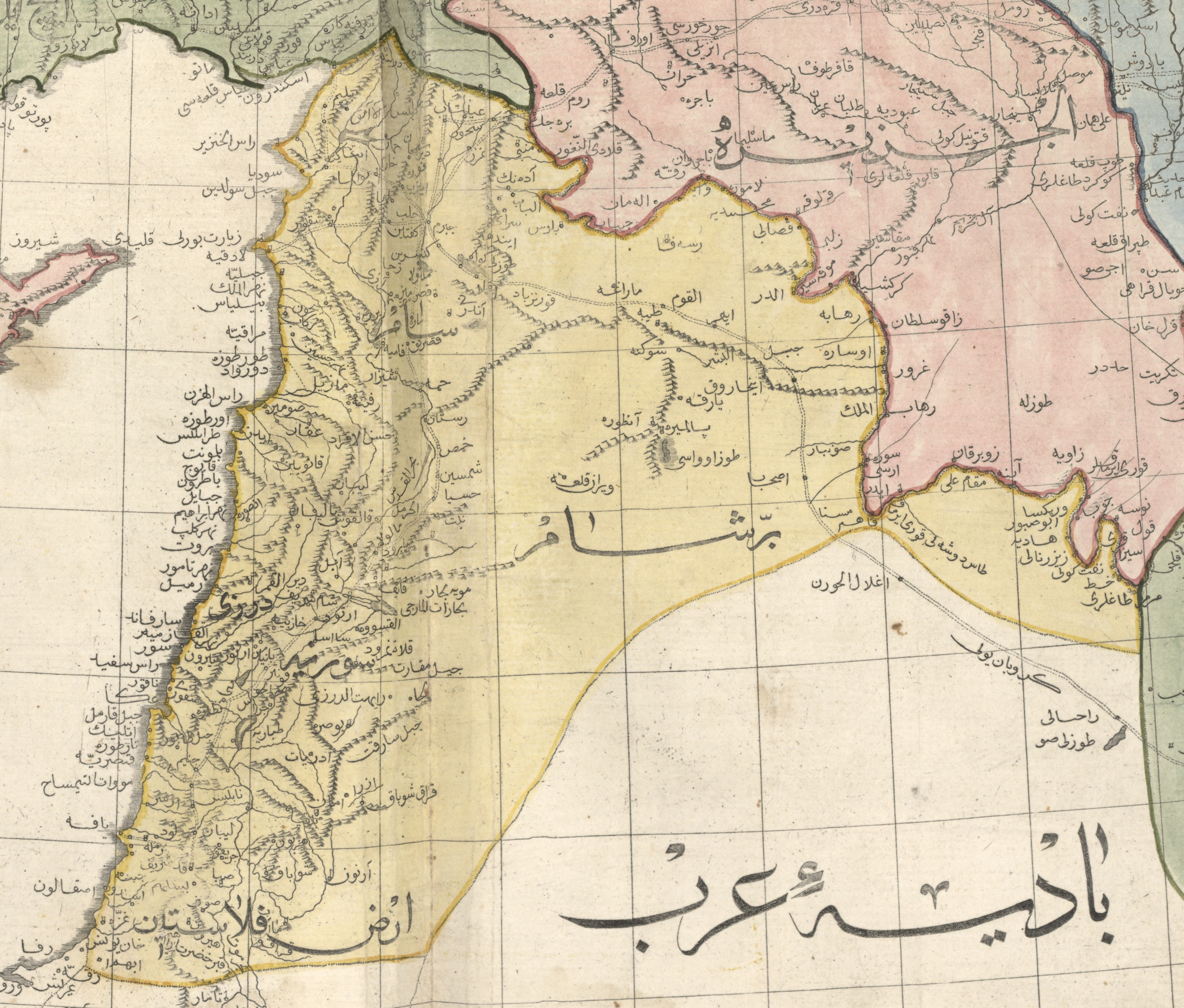
Syria in the Ottoman Cedid Atlas of 1803. In the yellow area, corresponding to the Levant, the medium sized bold text at the far right says “برشام” (“Bar Sham” or "Outskirts of Damascus/Syria"), and at bottom, it says "ارض فلاستان" ("Land of Palestine"). Near the top of the yellow area, it also says "الشام" (Al-Sham, meaning "Damascus/Syria". At the bottom right outside the yellow area in large text it says "بادية العرب" ("The Arab Desert", badiat il-Arab)

Southern Syria (Arabic: سوريا الجنوبية, romanized: Sūriyā al-Janūbiyya) is a geographical term referring to the southern portion of either the Ottoman-period Vilayet of Syria, or the modern-day Arab Republic of Syria.

The term was used in the Arabic language primarily from 1919 until the end of the Franco-Syrian war in July 1920, during which the Arab Kingdom of Syria existed.

Zachary Foster, in his Princeton University doctoral dissertation, has written that in the decades prior to World War I, the term “Southern Syria” was the least frequently used out of ten different ways to describe the region of Palestine in Arabic, noting it was so rare that “it took me nearly a decade to find a handful of references”.

== Background ==
Throughout the Ottoman period, prior to 1888, the Levant was viewed administratively as part of one province called the Vilayet of Syria and was divided into districts known as "Sanjaks".

Ottoman Palestine was, by the end of 19th and early 20th centuries divided into the Mutasarrifate of Jerusalem, the Nablus Sanjak, and the Acre Sanjak (under Beirut Vilayet from 1888, and previously under Syria Vilayet), and a short-lived Mutasarrıfate of Karak in Transjordan (split as a new administrative unit from Syria Vilayet in 1894/5). In 1884, the governor of Damascus proposed the establishment of a new Vilayet in southern Syria, composed of the regions of Jerusalem, Balqa' and Ma'an though nothing came out of this.

In the beginning of Faisal’s reign in the Arab Kingdom of Syria, particularly after the San Remo Conference of March 1920, the term "Southern Syria" emerged as a political neologism synonymous with Palestine, and it would take on an increased political significance as a way of rejecting the separation of Palestine from the Kingdom.

== Usage during British and French occupation ==
In the early 20th century, the term "Southern Syria" was a slogan that implied support for a Greater Syria nationalism associated with the kingdom promised to the Hashemite dynasty of the Hejaz by the British during World War I.

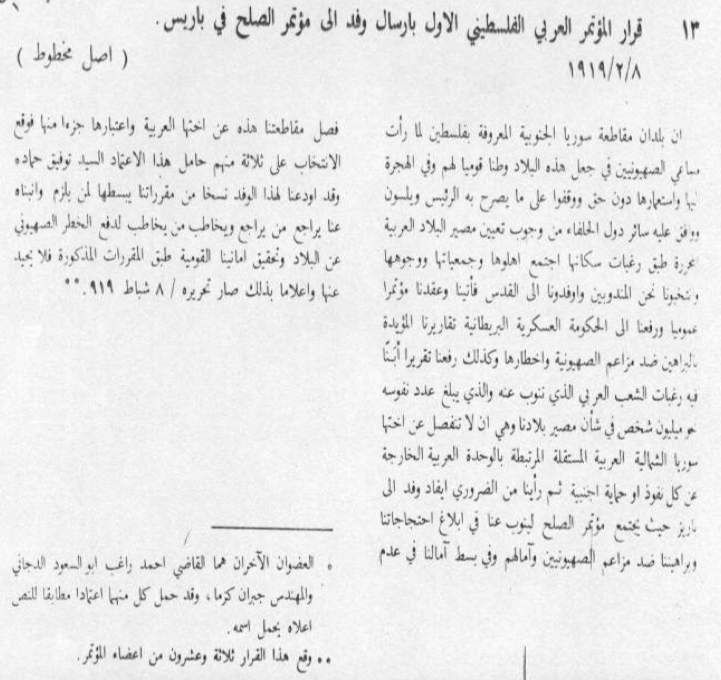
First Palestine Arab Congress resolution in February 1919, addressed to the Paris Peace Conference

After the war, the Hashemite prince Faisal attempted to establish Pan-Levantine state —a united kingdom that would comprise all of what eventually became Syria, Lebanon, Israel, Jordan, and Palestine, but he was stymied by conflicting promises made by the British to different parties (see Sykes–Picot Agreement), leading to the French creation of the mandate of Syria and Lebanon in 1920.

One of the resolutions adopted at the first Palestinian Arab Congress in 1919, Jerusalem, was:

"We consider Palestine nothing but part of Arab Syria, and it has never been separated from it at any stage. We are tied to it by national, religious, linguistic, moral, economic, and geographic bounds."

Yoav Gelber notes that the Historians of Palestinian Nationalism such as Yehoshua Porath and Muhammad Y. Muslih consider the declaration to have been ideologically disingenuous, pointing out that there was a split among Palestinians regarding the resolutions' implications. The younger generation was eager to pursue political opportunities in a unified Levantine state under Faisal I, and the older generation wished for Palestine's Independence to maintain their autonomous power in the post-Ottoman world order. Nonetheless, the resolution was mainly supported in the hopes of thwarting support for the Jewish National Homeland that was introduced in the 1917 Balfour Declaration on the occasion of the upcoming San Remo Conference by presenting that Palestine already belongs to another nation than Jews. The notables in Faisal's government in Damascus, such as Iraqis and Damascenes, including the Palestinians, had some conflict, and each sought to place their interests above others.

According to the Minutes of the Ninth Session of the League of Nations' Permanent Mandates Commission, held in 1926, "Southern Syria" was suggested by some as the name of Mandatory Palestine in the Arabic language. The reports say the following:

"Colonel Symes explained that the country was described as 'Palestine' by Europeans and as 'Falestin' by the Arabs. The Hebrew name for the country was the designation 'Land of Israel', and the Government, to meet Jewish wishes, had agreed that the word "Palestine" in Hebrew characters should be followed in all official documents by the initials that stood for that designation. As a set-off to this, certain Arab politicians suggested that the country should be called 'Southern Syria' in order to emphasize its close relation with another Arab State".

In 1932, a Palestinian Arab party named whose name "Hizb Al-Istiqlal" (Independence Party ) was established in Mandatory Palestine by the Sorbonne educated lawyer Awni Abd al-Hadi, whom Daniel Pipes says it the reaffirmed support for the incorporation of Palestine and its people into a Pan-Levantine state.

After when Mandatory Palestine ceased to exist in the aftermath of the Palestine War: the term has been used by Syrian Baathists who sought to expand Syria's borders and justify aggression against Israel, such as Hafiz Al Assad in 1974. The Baathists later went on to create Baathist Palestinian groups such as Al-Saqia in an effort to dominate the PLO and wrest it from Fatah. As of the 1990s Israeli-Syrian peace process, and the Syrian Civil War in the early 2010s: the Baathist party of Syria stopped claiming Israel and the Palestinian territories as "Southern Syria".
