= John Gannam =

Painter and illustrator

- Born: Fouzi Hanna Boughanam; 1905; Machgara, Beqaa Valley, Syria vilayet, Ottoman Empire
- Died: 1965 (aged 59–60)
- Known for: Painting

John Gannam (born Fouzi Hanna Boughanam; 1905–1965), was a painter and illustrator.

== Life ==
Fouzi Hanna Boughanam was born in Machgara in the Beqaa Valley, in what is now Lebanon. He and his parents immigrated to the United States when he was a child, where they began going by the surname "Gannon". Fouzi Gannon attended school until age 14, when his father died and he needed to find work. His early jobs included newspaper boy, bellhop, and messenger boy at the Crescent Engraving Company. In the latter, Gannam witnessed artists creating illustrations for catalogs, sparking his interest in pursuing art as a career.

Over the next few year, Gannon taught himself art and began developing a portfolio. In 1926, when he was 18, he began looking for work as an illustrator. It was at this point that "Fouzi Gannon" began going by "John Gannam". Gannam found work at an advertising studio in Detroit, where his talent was quickly recognized by his boss. His "fine art" style also appealed to companies, who wanted advertisements to make their products seem "classy". In 1930, he was hired by an art studio in New York City.

In the city, Gannam continued to illustrate advertisements, but also began creating illustrations for fiction in magazines such as The Woman’s Home Companion, Cosmopolitan, Good Housekeeping, and Collier’s. In 1933, he began illustrating for The Saturday Evening Post.

Unlike many other illustrators at the time, Gannam specialized in watercolor paintings. He was particularly concerned with the quality of his pieces, and took weeks to work on compositions or study techniques. He often flaunted deadlines to continue working on a piece he wasn't happy with.

His images were praised by critics, and won him the first prize in the 1946 nationwide competition, ahead of Norman Rockwell. He was elected an Associate of the National Academy of Design and Member of the American Watercolor Society; Artists Professional League. He entered the Board of Directors of Danbury Academy of Arts.

He was honoured in Society of Illustrators Hall of Fame in 1981.
