= Jajiyah =

al-Jajiyah الجاجية
- Village
- Location in Syria
- Coordinates: 35.116797°N 36.798556°E
- Country: Syria
- Governorate: Hama
- District: Hama
- Subdistrict: Hama

Population (2004)
  - Total: 6,419
- Time zone: UTC+3 (AST)
- City Qrya Pcode: C2965

al-Jajiyah (Arabic: الجاجية, romanized: al-Jājīyah, also known as al-Dajajiya) is a village in central Syria, administratively part of the Hama Governorate, located on the eastern outskirts of Hama city. According to the Syria Central Bureau of Statistics (CBS), Jajiyah had a population of 6,419 in the 2004 census. Its inhabitants are Sunni Muslims.

== History ==
=== Ottoman period ===
Jajiyah was one of three villages in the Hama Sanjak, all situated on the banks of the Orontes River, that was classified as qutuniyat, or 'cotton-growing', in 1818 Ottoman tax records. It consisted of 22 feddans and paid 4,950 qirsh in taxes. In 1836, Muhammad Khurfan Bey, the emir of the Mawali, a large Arab tribe in central Syria, leased an extensive tract of waqf (endowment) land in Jajiyah.

In the late 19th century, Jajiyah's agrarian inhabitants ceded one third of their lands to a notable from Hama, Taksun Bey, for his defense of the residents against legal attempts by the Azm family to take ownership of the village. The effort did not succeed and the residents lost ownership of their lands. Around 1900, most of these formerly small landholders emigrated from Jajiyah, leaving about forty impoverished sharecroppers.

=== French Mandatory period ===
In the early 1930s, during French Mandatory rule, the owners of the village belonged to a number of large landowning families from Hama, including the al-Azm. The inhabitants were Sunni Muslim Arabs, of Bedouin and/or Turkmen origin.

== Bibliography ==
- Comité de l'Asie française (April 1933). "Notes sur la propriété foncière dans le Syrie centrale (Notes on Landownership in Central Syria)". Bulletin du Comité de l'Asie française (in French). 33 (309). Comité de l'Asie française: 130–136.
- Douwes, Dick (2000). The Ottomans in Syria: A History of Justice and Oppression. I.B. Tauris. ISBN 1860640311.
