= Damascus Sanjak =

Damascus Sanjak Şam Sancağı
- sanjak of the Ottoman Empire under Damascus Eyalet (1549–1865) under Sidon Eyalet (1660–1864) under Damascus Vilayet (1865–1918)
- 1549–1918
- Coat of arms
- Capital: Damascus
- History
  - Established: 1549
  - Armistice of Mudros: 1918
Succeeded by
Occupied Enemy Territory Administration
- Today part of: Syria; Lebanon

The Damascus Sanjak (Turkish: Şam Sancağı; Arabic: سنجق دمشق) was a prefecture (sanjak) of the Ottoman Empire, occupying the center of Ottoman Syria, located in modern-day Syria and Lebanon. The city of Damascus was the Sanjak's capital. It was bordered by the Hauran Sanjak to the south, Hama Sanjak to the north, and Beirut Vilayet to the west.

== Subdistricts ==
- Damascus Sanjak had the following nahiyahs: Damascus, Baalbek, Beqaa, Douma, Hasbaya, Rashaya, Wadi al-Ajam (Qatana) and Zabadani.

== Later history ==
When dividing Ottoman Syria, the French mandate authorities detached the westernmost part of the sanjak and allocated it to its newly created Greater Lebanon, while the rest remained in the shriveled Syrian state.
