= Homs Sanjak =

Prefecture of Ottoman Syria

Coordinates: 34°43′51″N 36°42′34″E

Homs Sanjak Homs Sancağı
- sanjak of the Ottoman Empire; Under Aleppo Eyalet (1549–1579); Under Tripoli Eyalet (1579–1864); Under Syria Vilayet (1864–1918)
- 1549–1918
- Coat of arms

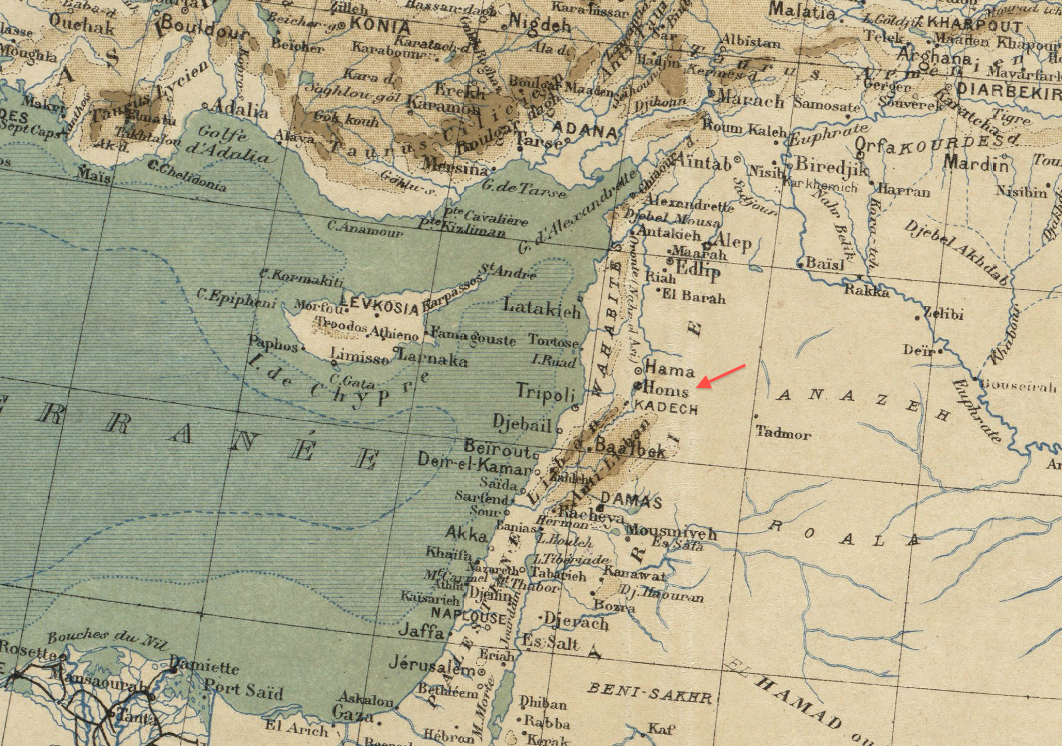
- Map from 1883; Homs indicated by arrow
- Capital: Homs
- History
  - Established: 1549
  - Armistice of Mudros: 1918
Succeeded by
Occupied Enemy Territory Administration
- Today part of: Syria

The Homs Sanjak (Turkish: Homs Sancağı; Arabic: سنجق حمص, romanized: Sanjaq Ḥimṣ) was a prefecture (sanjak) of the Ottoman Empire, located in modern-day Syria. The city of Homs was the Sanjak's capital. It had a population of 200,410 in 1914. The Sanjak of Homs shared same region with Sanjak of Hama and Sanjak of Salamiyah.
