= Tripoli Eyalet =

Ottoman province (1579-1864)

Tripoli Eyalet Eyālet-i Ṭrāblus-ı Şām طرابلس الشام
- Eyalet of the Ottoman Empire
- 1579–1864
- Flag

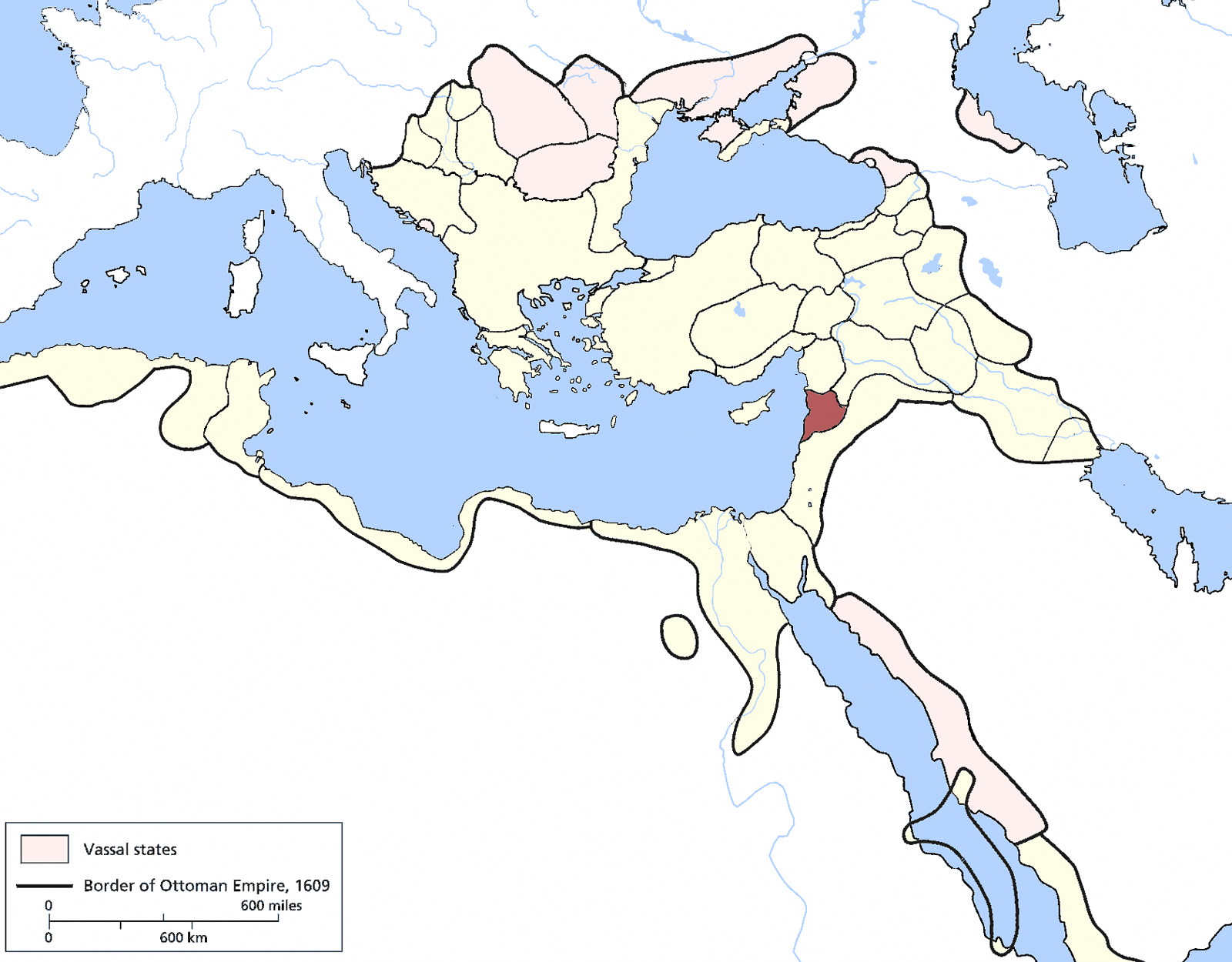
- The Tripoli Eyalet in 1609
- Capital: Tripoli
- Area
  - Coordinates: 34°26′N 35°51′E
- History
  - Established: 1579
  - Disestablished: 1864
Preceded by	Succeeded by
Damascus Eyalet; Aleppo Eyalet	Beirut Vilayet; Syria Vilayet
- Today part of: Lebanon; Syria

Tripoli Eyalet (Ottoman Turkish: ایالت طرابلس شام, romanized: Eyālet-i Ṭrāblus-ı Şām; Arabic: طرابلس الشام) was an eyalet of the Ottoman Empire. The capital was in Tripoli, Lebanon. Its reported area in the 19th century was 1,629 square miles (4,220 km^{2}).

It extended along the coast, from the southern limits of the Amanus mountains in the north, to the gorge of Maameltein to the south, which separated it from the territory of the sanjak of Sidon-Beirut.

Along with the chiefly Sunni Muslim and Maronite Christian coastal towns of Latakia, Jableh, Baniyas, Tartus, Tripoli, Batrun and Byblos, the eyalet included the Wadi al-Nasara valley (the Valley of the Christians), the An-Nusayriyah Mountains, inhabited by Alawites, as well as the northern reaches of the Lebanon range, where the majority of inhabitants were Maronite Christians.

== History ==
Ottoman rule in the region began in 1516, but the eyalet wasn't established until 1579, when it was created from the north-western districts of the eyalets of Damascus and Aleppo. Previously, it had been an eyalet for a few months in 1521.

From the time of the Ottoman conquest in 1516 until 1579, the affairs of the sanjak were under the control of the Turkoman ‘Assaf emirs of Ghazir in Kisrawan. When the eyalet was reconstituted in 1579, a new Turkoman family was put in charge, the Sayfas, and they held power until the death of the family's patriarch, Yusuf, in 1625. The Sayfas were frequently dismissed as governors, mainly for failing to meet their financial obligations to the state, rather than for being rebellious.

From 1800 to 1808, 1810–20 and 1821–35 the governor of the eyalet was Mustafa Agha Barbar.

== Administrative divisions ==
The Eyalet had seven sanjaks in the 17th century, according to Evliya Çelebi:

1. Tripoli Sanjak
2. Hama Sanjak
3. Homs Sanjak
4. Salamieh Sanjak (Salamiyah)
5. Jebella Sanjak (Jableh)
6. Latakia Sanjak (Latakia)
7. Husnabad Sanjak (Al-Husn)
- The province also had forty Druze beys who controlled their territory in the mountains (Emirate of Mount Lebanon)

Eyalet consisted of five sanjaks between 1700 and 1740 as follows:

1. Tripoli Sanjak (Trablus-Şam : Paşa Sancağı, Tripoli)
2. Hama Sanjak (Hama Sancağı, Hama)
3. Homs Sanjak (Hums Sancağı, Homs)
4. Salamieh Sanjak (Selemiyye Sancağı, Salamiyah)
5. Jebella Sanjak or Jebellieh Sanjak (Cebeliyye Sancağı, Jableh)
