= Mutasarrifate of Jerusalem =

1872–1917 special administrative district of the Ottoman Empire

Mutasarrifate of Jerusalem قُدس شَرِيف مُتَصَرِّفلغى (Ottoman Turkish) Kudüs-i Şerif Mutasarrıflığı متصرفية القدس الشريف (Arabic) Mutaṣarrifiyyat al-Quds aš-Šarīf
- Mutasarrifate of the Ottoman Empire
- 1872–1917
- Flag

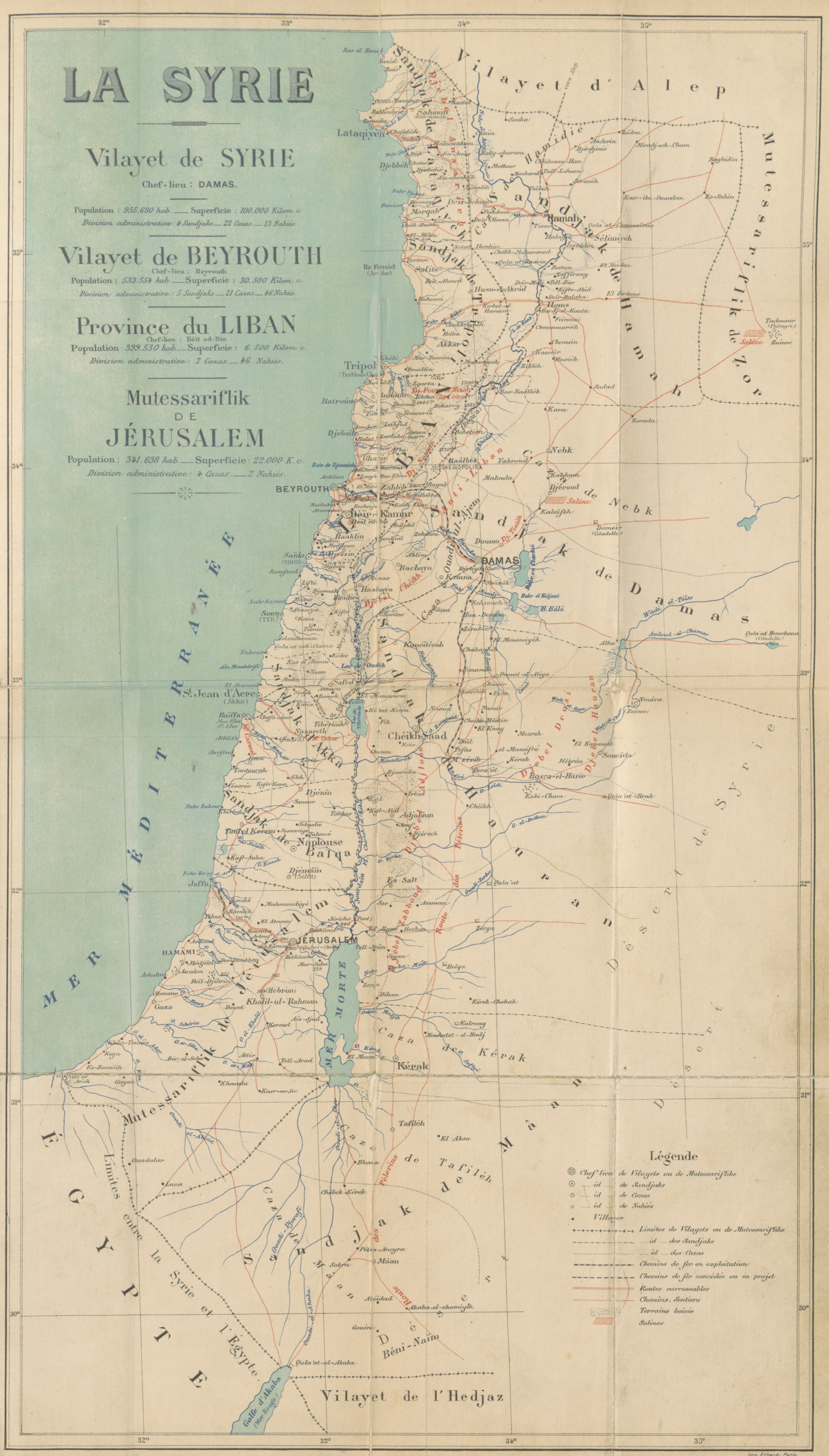
- Vital Cuinet's 1896 map of Syria, including the "Mutessariflik de Jerusalem"
- Capital: Jerusalem
- Area
  - Coordinates: 31°41′N 34°54′E
  - 1862: 12,486 km^{2} (4,821 sq mi)
- Population
  - 1897: 298,653
- Historical era: Ottoman Palestine
  - The Tanzimat reforms: 1872
  - First Aliyah: 1881
  - Construction of the Jaffa–Jerusalem railway: 1892
  - Battle of Jerusalem: 1917
Preceded by	Succeeded by
Jerusalem Sanjak; Gaza Sanjak	OETA South
- Today part of: Egypt; Israel; Jordan; Palestine

The Mutasarrifate of Jerusalem (Ottoman Turkish: قُدس شَرِيف مُتَصَرِّفلغى, Kudüs-i Şerif Mutasarrıflığı; Arabic: متصرفية القدس الشريف, Mutaṣarrifiyyat al-quds aš-šarīf, French: Moutassarifat de Jérusalem), also known as the Sanjak of Jerusalem, was a district in Ottoman Syria with special administrative status established in 1872. The district encompassed Jerusalem as well as Hebron, Jaffa, Gaza and Beersheba. Many documents during the Late Ottoman period refer to the Mutasarrifate of Jerusalem as Palestine; one such describes Palestine as including the Sanjak of Nablus and Sanjak of Akka (Acre) as well, more in line with European usage. (Note: The 1915 Filastin Risalesi ("Palestine Document") is a country survey of the VIII Corps of the Ottoman Army, which identified Palestine as a region including the sanjaqs of Akka (the Galilee), the Sanjaq of Nablus, and the Sanjaq of Jerusalem (Kudus Sherif). "The new expanded use of the designation Filistin by the Ottoman military authorities in Risalesi therefore, is novel, but not arbitrary," since the boundaries of Filistin were never precisely defined; see Ottoman Conceptions of Palestine-Part 2: Ethnography and Cartography, Salim Tamari) It was the seventh most heavily populated region of the Ottoman Empire's 36 provinces.

The district was separated from the Damascus Eyalet and placed directly under the supervision of the Ottoman central government in Constantinople (now Istanbul) in 1841, and formally created as an independent province in 1872 by Grand Vizier Mahmud Nedim Pasha. Scholars provide a variety of reasons for the separation, including increased European interest in the region, and strengthening of the southern border of the Empire against the Khedivate of Egypt. Initially, the Mutasarrifate of Acre and Mutasarrifate of Nablus were combined with the province of Jerusalem, with the combined province being referred to in the register of the court of Jerusalem as the "Jerusalem Eyalet", and referred to by the British consul as the creation of "Palestine into a separate eyalet". After less than two months, the sanjaks of Nablus and Acre were separated and added to the Vilayet of Beirut, leaving just the Mutasarrifate of Jerusalem. In 1906, the Kaza of Nazareth was added to the Jerusalem Mutasarrifate as an exclave, primarily in order to allow the issuance of a single tourist permit to Christian travellers.

The area was conquered by the Allied Forces in 1917 during World War I and a military Occupied Enemy Territory Administration, OETA South, was set up to replace the Ottoman administration. OETA South consisted of the Ottoman sanjaks of Jerusalem, Nablus and Acre. The military administration was replaced by a British civilian administration in 1920 and the area of OETA South was incorporated into the British Mandate of Palestine in 1923.

The political status of the Mutasarrifate of Jerusalem was unique from other Ottoman provinces as it was under the direct authority of the Ottoman government in Constantinople. The inhabitants identified themselves primarily on religious terms, 84% being Muslim Arabs. The district's villages were normally inhabited by farmers while its towns were populated by merchants, artisans, landowners and money-lenders. The elite consisted of the religious leadership, wealthy landlords and high-ranking civil servants.

== History ==
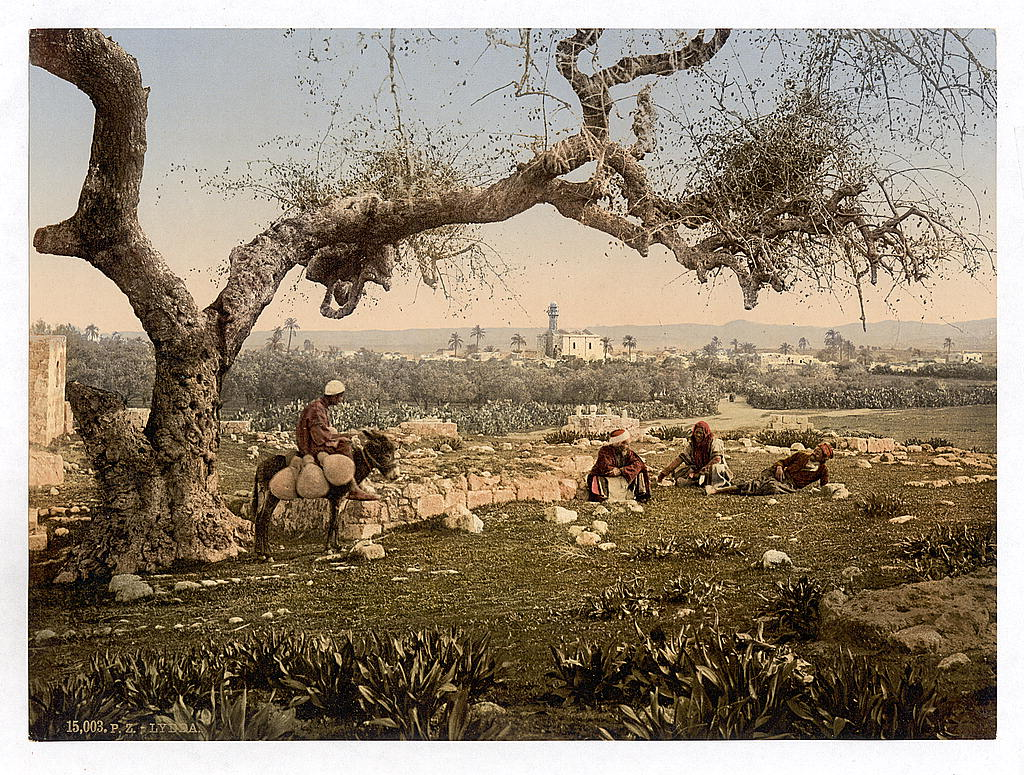
View of Lydda from the southwest, 1890–1900

In 1841, the district was separated from Damascus Eyalet and placed directly under Constantinople and formally created as an independent Mutasarrifate in 1872. Before 1872, the Mutasarrifate of Jerusalem was officially a sanjak within the Syria Vilayet (created in 1864, following the Tanzimat reforms).

The southern border of the Mutasarrifate of Jerusalem was redrawn in 1906, at the instigation of the British, who were interested in safeguarding their imperial interests and in making the border as short and patrollable as possible.

In the mid-19th century the inhabitants of Palestine identified themselves primarily in terms of religious affiliation. The population was more than 80% Muslim Arab, 10% Christian (mostly Arab), 5% Jewish, and 1% Druze. Towards the end of the 19th century, the idea that the region of Palestine or the Mutasarrifate of Jerusalem formed a separate political entity became widespread among the district's educated Arab classes. In 1904, former Jerusalem official Najib Azuri formed in Paris, France the Ligue de la Patrie Arabe ("Arab Fatherland League") whose goal was to free Ottoman Syria and Iraq from Turkish domination. In 1908, Azuri proposed the elevation of the mutasarrifate to the status of vilayet to the Ottoman Parliament after the 1908 Young Turk Revolution. A section of the 1914 Ottoman census (Note: Mutasarrifate of Jerusalem is referred to as Jerusalem Sanjak in the official document) listed its population figures.

The area was conquered by the Allied Forces in 1917 during the Palestine campaign of World War I and a military Occupied Enemy Territory Administration (OETA South) set up to replace the Ottoman administration. OETA South consisted of the Ottoman sanjaks of Jerusalem, Nablus and Acre. The military administration was replaced by a British civilian administration in 1920 and the area of OETA South became the territory of the British Mandate of Palestine in 1923, with some border adjustments with Lebanon and Syria.

== Boundaries ==
The division was bounded on the west by the Mediterranean, on the east by the River Jordan and the Dead Sea, on the north by a line from the mouth of the river Auja to the bridge over the Jordan near Jericho, and on the south by a line from midway between Gaza and Arish to Aqaba.

=== Maps ===
Below are a series of contemporary Ottoman maps showing the "Quds Al-Sharif Sancağı" or "Quds Al-Sharif Mutasarrıflığı". The 1907 maps show the 1860 borders between Ottoman Syria and the Khedivate of Egypt, although the border was moved to the current Israel-Egypt border in 1906, and the area north of the Negev Desert is labelled "Filastin" (Palestine).

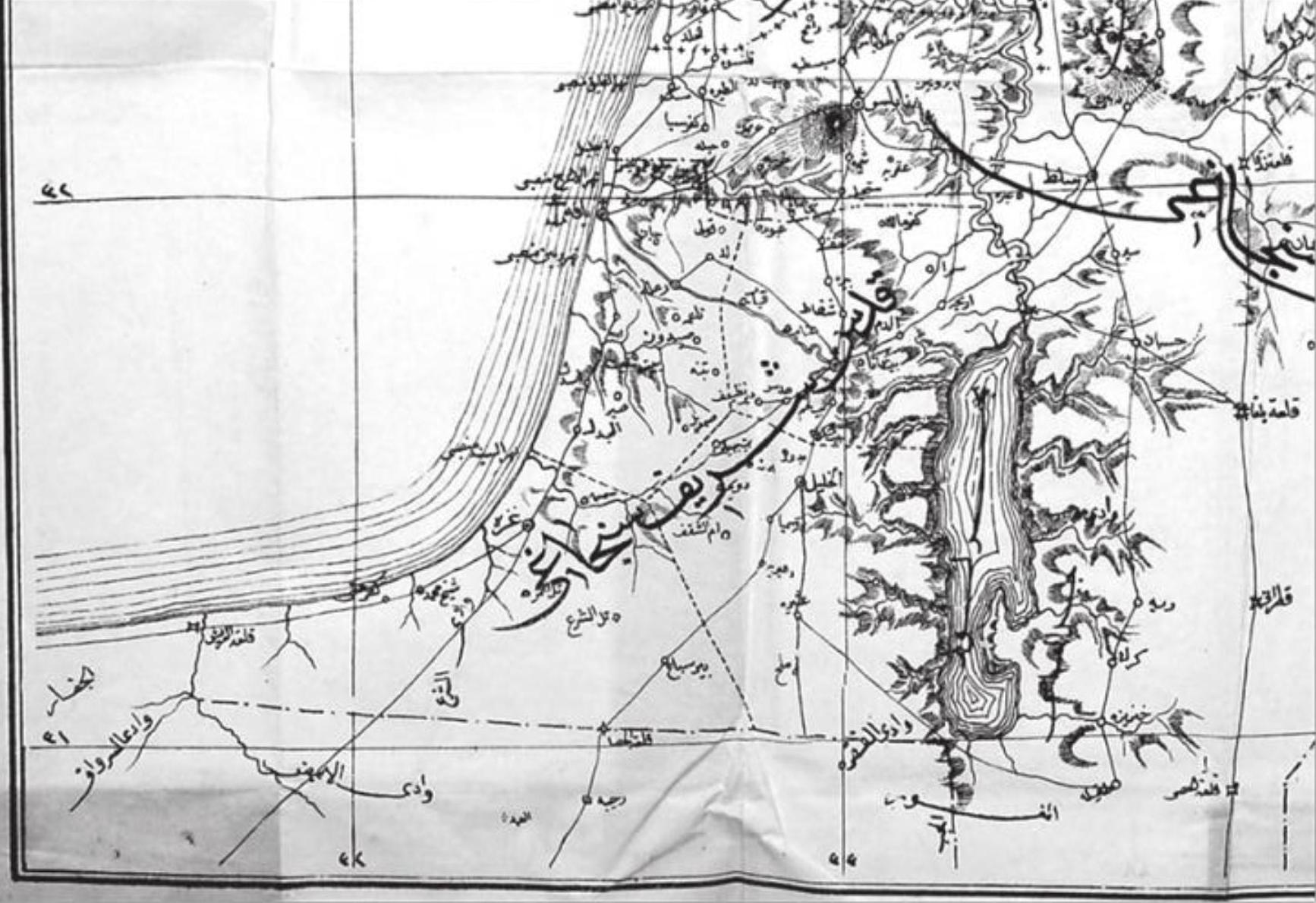
1883

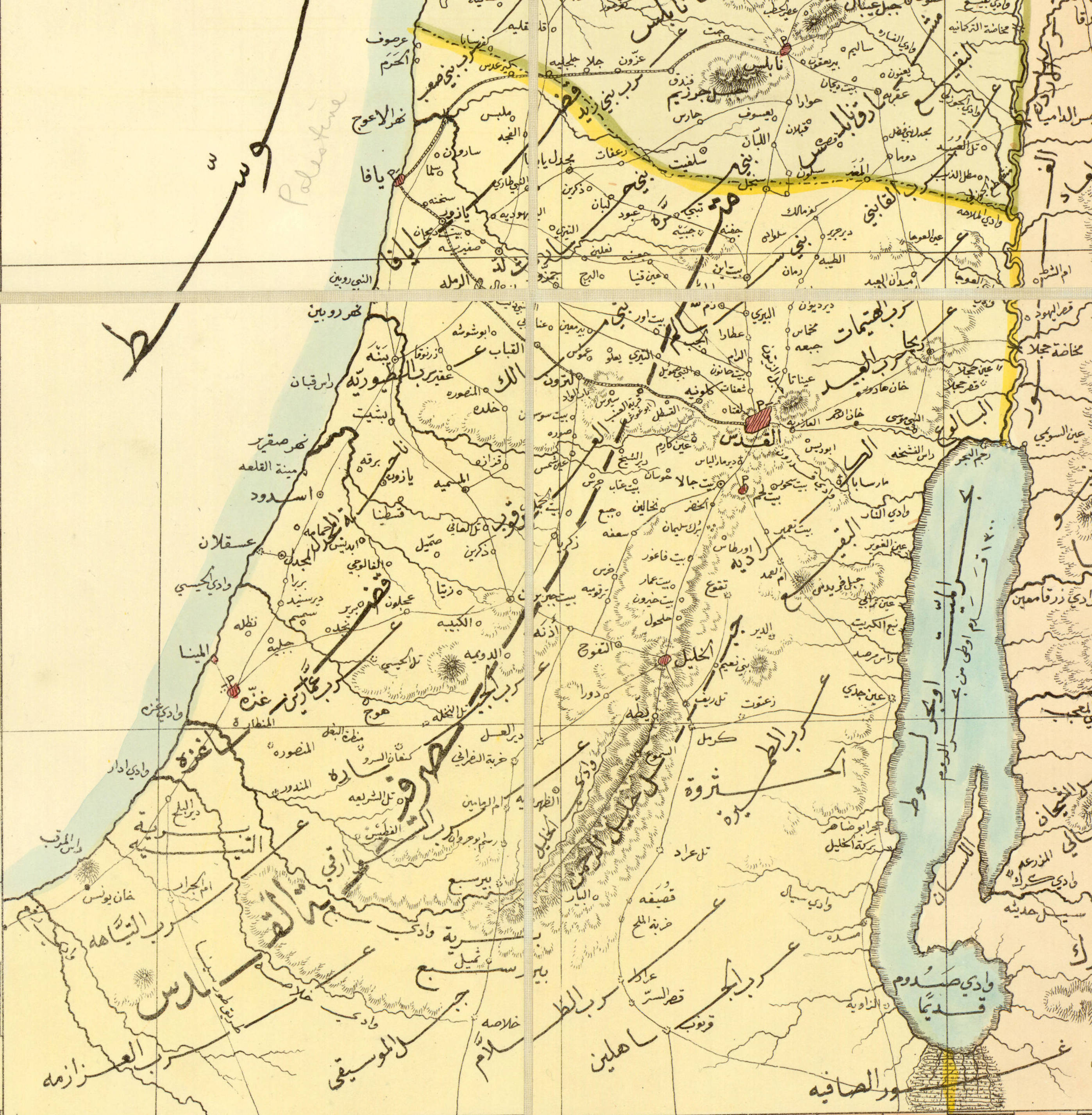
1889

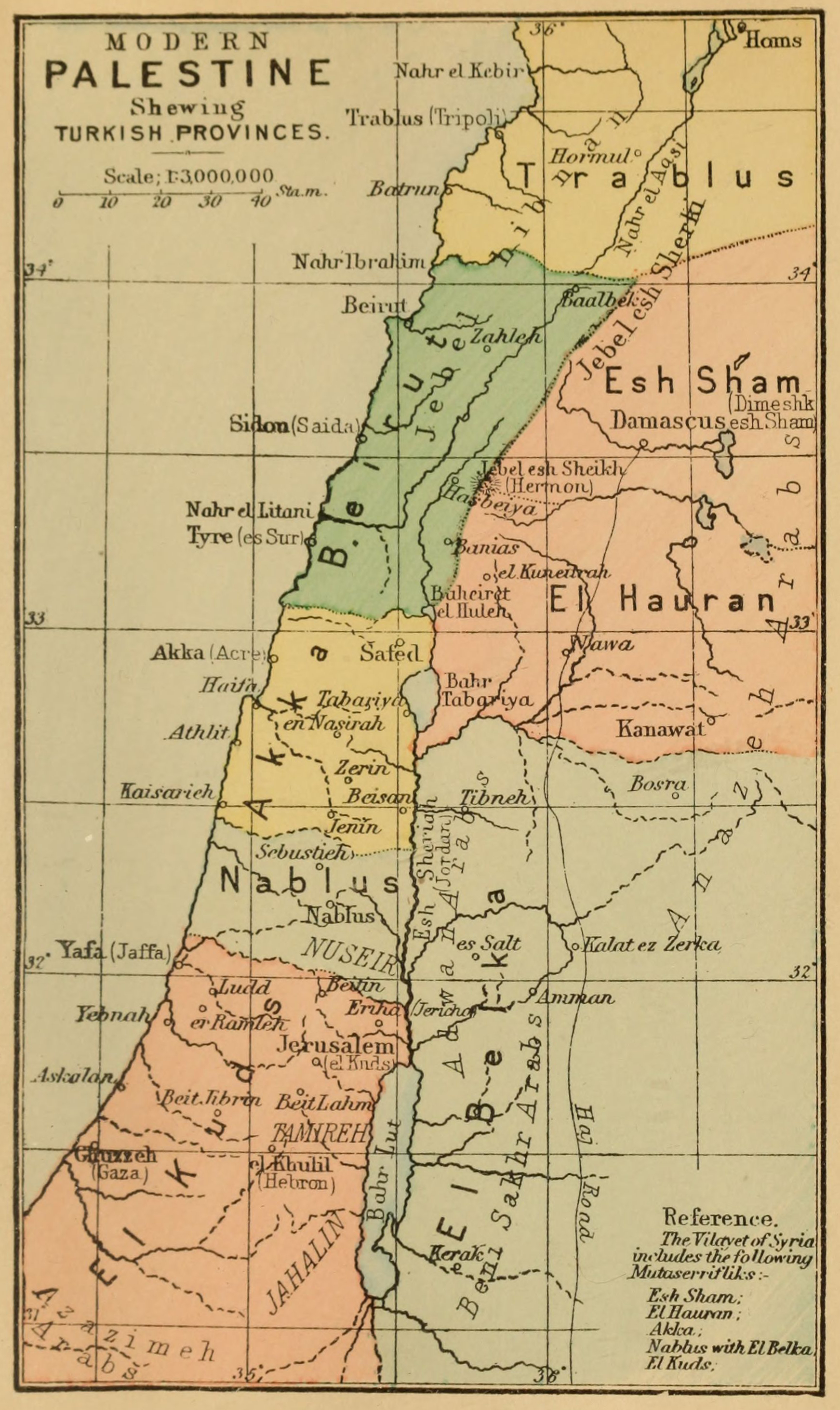
1889

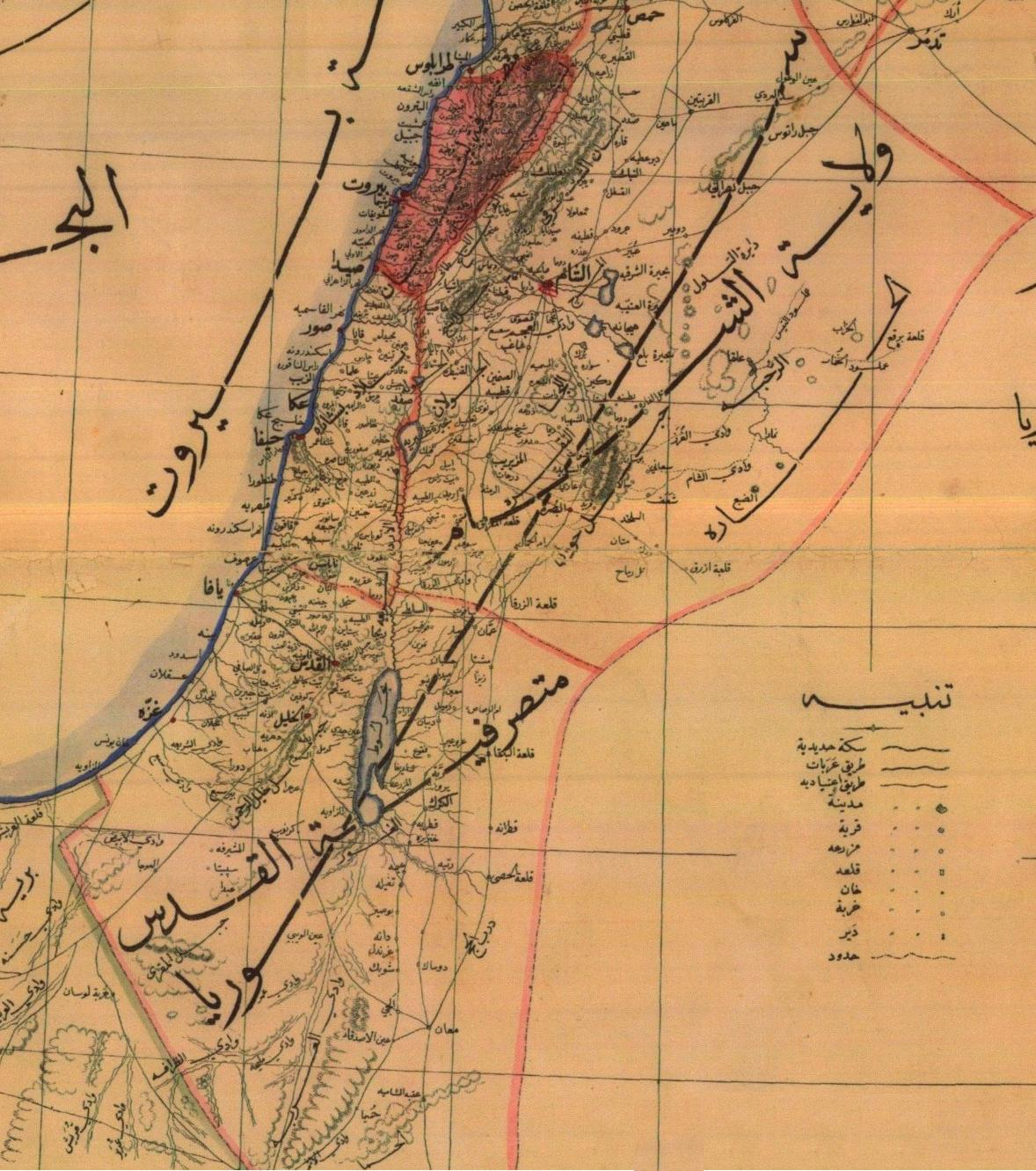
1893

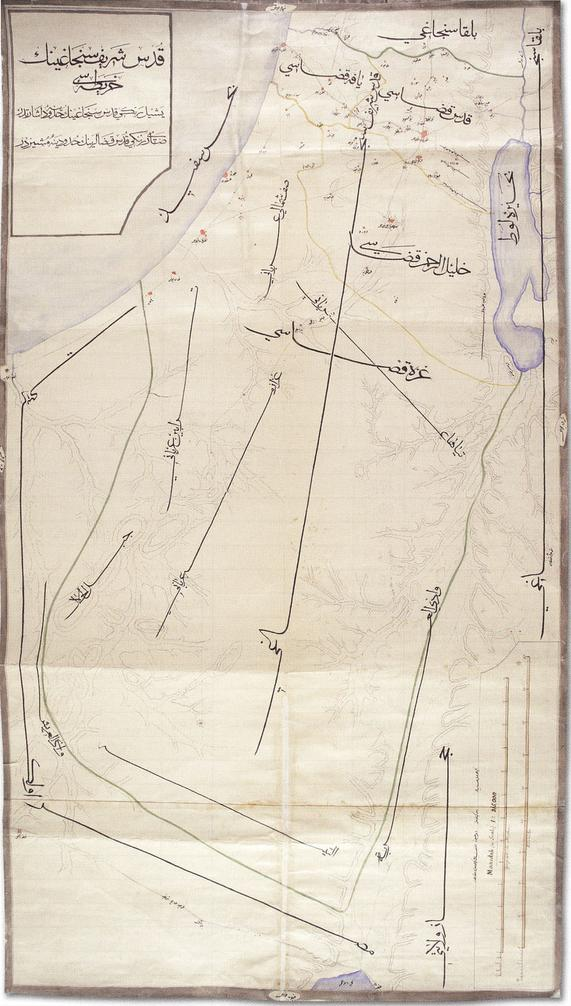
c.1900

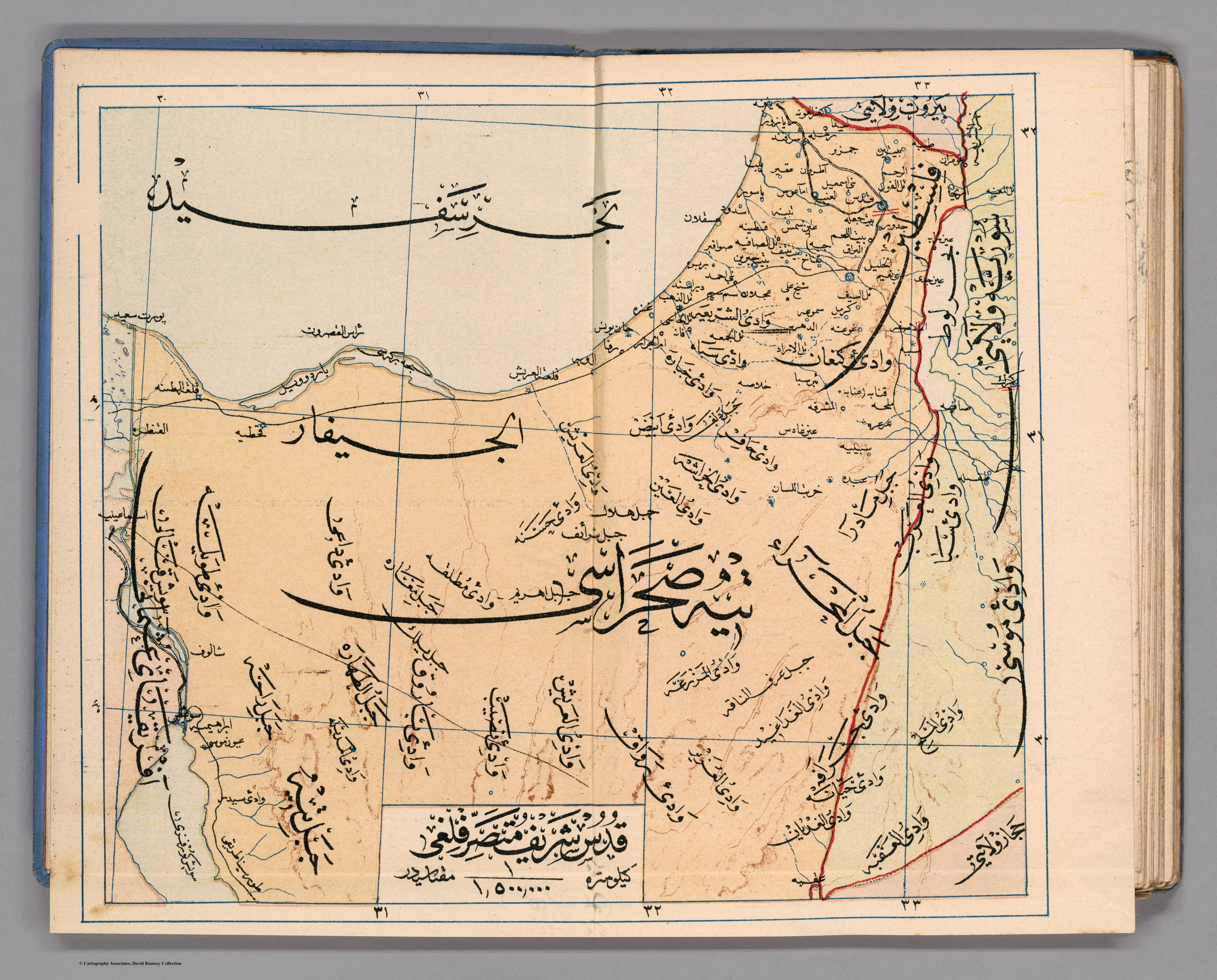
1907

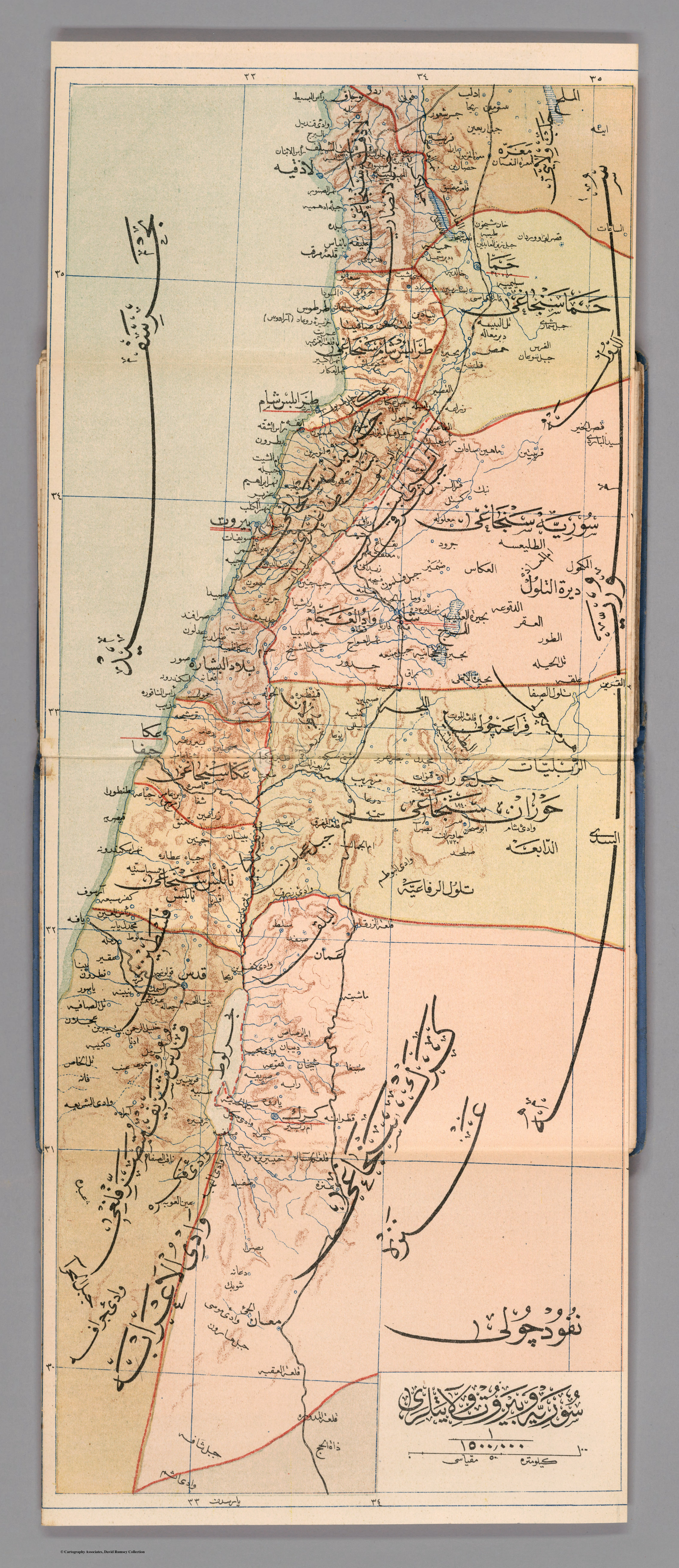
1907

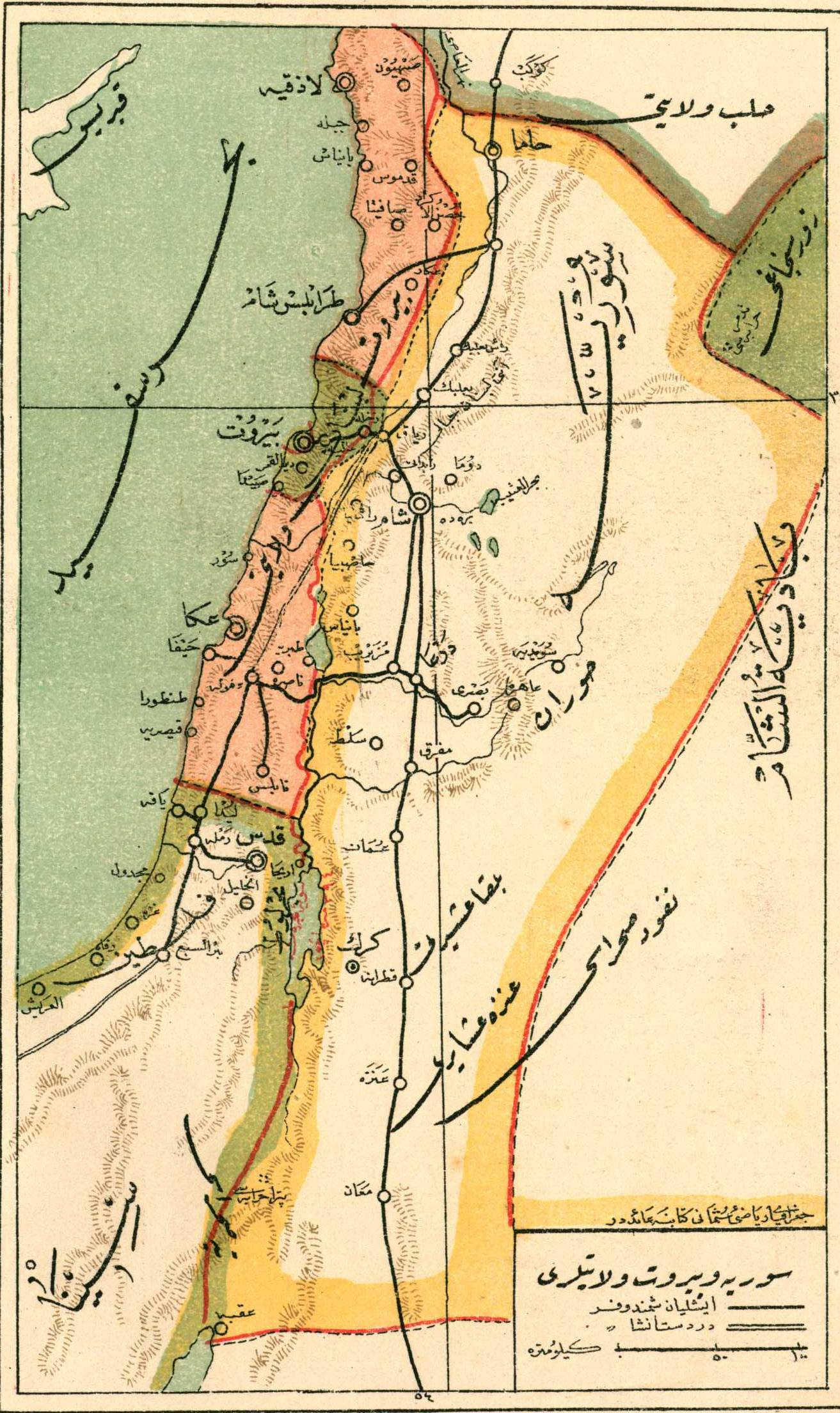
1912-13

== Administrative divisions ==
C.R. Condor described the administrative duties which he saw performed in Palestine in 1874:

The whole of Syria is under the Wâly of Damascus, and Palestine is under the Mutaserifs of Acre and Jerusalem, who are appointed by that Wâly. These provinces are again subdivided, and Kaimakâms or lieutenant-governors, are placed in such towns as Jaffa, Ramleh, Jenin, etc. ... The system of government is simple. The only duties are to collect the taxes, and to put down riots, which constantly occur. The crown-lands are farmed to the highest bidder... Soldiers are sent to collect the money, and the crop is assessed before reaping... The tax in the Mulk-lands has been definitely fixed, without regard to the difference of the harvests in good and bad years.

— C.R. Condor, Tent Work in Palestine

Administrative divisions of the Mutasarrifate (1872–1909):

1. Beersheba Kaza (Ottoman Turkish: قضا بءرالسبع; Turkish: Birüsseb' kazası; Arabic: قضاء بئر السبع), which included two sub-districts and a municipality:
  - a-Hafir (Ottoman Turkish: ناحيه حفير; Turkish: Hafır nahiyesı; Arabic: ناحية عوجة الحفير), created in 1908 as a middle point between Beersheba and Aqaba, close to the newly agreed border with Sinai
  - al-Mulayha, created in 1908 as a midway point between Hafir and Aqaba
  - Beersheba (Ottoman Turkish: بلدية بءرالسبع; Turkish: Birüsseb' belediyesı; Arabic: بلدية بئر السبع), created in 1901
2. Gaza Kaza (Ottoman Turkish: قضا غزّه; Turkish: Gazze kazası; Arabic: قضاء غزة), which included three sub-districts and a municipality:
  - Al-Faluja (Ottoman Turkish: ناحيه فلوجه; Turkish: Felluce nahiyesı; Arabic: ناحية الفالوجة), created in 1903
  - Khan Yunis (Ottoman Turkish: ناحيه خان يونس; Turkish: Hanyunus nahiyesı; Arabic: ناحية خان يونس), created in 1903 and became a municipality in 1917
  - al-Majdal (Ottoman Turkish: ... ناحيه; Turkish: Mücdel nahiyesı; Arabic: ناحية المجدل), created in 1880
  - Gaza (Ottoman Turkish: بلدية غزّه; Turkish: Gazze belediyesı; Arabic: بلدية غزة), created in 1893
3. Hebron Kaza (Ottoman Turkish: قضا خليل الرحمن; Turkish: Halilü'r Rahman kazası; Arabic: قضاء الخليل), which included two sub-districts and a municipality:
  - Bayt 'Itab (Ottoman Turkish: ناحيه بيت اعطاب; Turkish: Beyt-i a'tâb nahiyesı; Arabic: ناحية بيت عطاب), created in 1903
  - Bayt Jibrin (Ottoman Turkish: ناحيه بيت جبرين; Turkish: Beyt-i Cireyn nahiyesı; Arabic: ناحية بيت جبرين), created in 1903
  - Hebron (Ottoman Turkish: بلدية خليل الرحمن; Turkish: Halilü'r Rahman belediyesı; Arabic: بلدية الخليل), created in 1886
4. Jaffa Kaza (Ottoman Turkish: قضا يافه; Turkish: Yafa kazası; Arabic: قضاء يَافَا), which included two sub-districts and a municipality:
  - Ni'lin (Ottoman Turkish: ناحيه نعلين; Turkish: Na’leyn nahiyesı; Arabic: ناحية نعلين), created in 1903
  - Ramla (Ottoman Turkish: ناحيه رمله; Turkish: Remle nahiyesı; Arabic: ناحية الرملة), created in 1880, became municipality before 1888 and re-established as sub-district in 1889
  - Lydda (Ottoman Turkish: ... بلدية; Turkish: Lod belediyesı; Arabic: ... بلدية)
5. Jerusalem Kaza (Ottoman Turkish: قضا قدس; Turkish: Kudüs-i Şerif kazası; Arabic: قضاء القدس الشريف), which included four sub-districts and two municipalities:
  - Abwein (Ottoman Turkish: ... ناحيه; Turkish: Abaveyn nahiyesı; Arabic: ناحية عبوين), created in 1903;
  - Bethlehem (Ottoman Turkish: ناحيه بيت اللحم; Turkish: Beytü'l lahim nahiyesı; Arabic: ناحية بيت لحم), created in 1883 and became a municipality in 1894;
  - Ramallah (Ottoman Turkish: ناحيه رام الله; Turkish: Ramallah nahiyesı; Arabic: ناحية رام الله), created in 1903 and became a municipality in 1911,
  - Saffa (Ottoman Turkish: ناحيه صفا; Turkish: Safa nahiyesı; Arabic: ناحية صفّا),
  - Jerusalem (Ottoman Turkish: بلدية قدس; Turkish: Kudüs-i Şerif belediyesı; Arabic: بلدية القدس الشريف), created in 1867 and
  - Beit Jala (Ottoman Turkish: ... بلدية; Turkish: ... belediyesı; Arabic: بلدية بيت جالا), created in 1912.
6. Nazareth Kaza (Ottoman Turkish: قضا الْنَاصِرَة; Turkish: Nasra kazası; Arabic: قضاء الْنَاصِرَة), established 1906.

== Mutasarrıfs of Jerusalem ==
The Mutasarrıfs of Jerusalem were appointed by the Sublime Porte to govern the district. They were usually experienced civil servants who spoke little or no Arabic, but knew a European language - most commonly French - in addition to Ottoman Turkish.

=== Pre-separation from Damascus ===
- Sureyya Pasha 1857–63
- Izzet Pasha 1864–67
- Nazif Pasha 1867–69
- Kamil Pasha 1869–71
- Ali Bey 1871–72

=== Post-separation from Damascus ===
- Nazif Pasha (same as above) 1872–73
- Kamil Pasha (same as above) 1873–75
- Ali Bey (same as above) 1874–76
- Faik Bey 1876–77
- Mehmed Rauf Pasha 1877–89
- Resad Pasha 1889–90
- Ibrahim Hakki Pasha 1890–97
- Mehmet Tevfik Biren 1897–01
- Mehmet Cavit Bey 1901–02
- Osman Kazim Bey 1902–04
- Ahmed Resid Bey 1904–06
- Ali Ekrem Bolayır 1906–08

=== Post-Young Turk Revolution ===
List of mutasarrıfs after the 1908 Young Turk Revolution:

- Subhi Bey 1908–09
- Nazim Bey 1909–10
- Azmi Bey 1910–11
- Cevdet Bey 1911–12
- Mehdi Frashëri (Muhdi Bey) 1912
- Tahir Hayreddin Bey 1912–13
- Ahmed Macid Bey 1913–15

== See also ==
- Ottoman Syria
- History of Jerusalem
- Mount Lebanon Mutasarrifate
- Timeline of the name "Palestine"
- 1914 Ottoman census

== Bibliography ==
- Abu-Manneh, Butrus (1999). "The Rise of the Sanjak of Jerusalem in the Late Nineteenth Century". In Ilan Pappé (ed.). The Israel/Palestine Question. Psychology Press. ISBN 978-0-415-16948-6.
- Büssow, Johann (2011). Hamidian Palestine: Politics and Society in the District of Jerusalem 1872–1908. BRILL. ISBN 978-90-04-20569-7.
- Conder, C.R. (1879). Tent Work in Palestine. A Record of Discovery and Adventure. Vol. 2. London: Richard Bentley & Son (published for the Committee of the PEF). OCLC 23589738.
- El-Hasan, Hasan Afif (2010). Israel Or Palestine? Is the Two-state Solution Already Dead?. Algora Publishing. p. 38. ISBN 978-0-87586-793-9.
- Gardus, Yehuda; Shmueli, Avshalom, eds. (1978–79). [The Land of the Negev] (in Hebrew). Ministry of Defense Publishing. pp. 369–370.
- Jankowski, James P.; Gershoni, Israel (1997). Rethinking Nationalism in the Arab Middle East. Columbia University Press. p. 174. ISBN 978-0-231-10695-5.
- Macmunn, G. F.; Falls, C. (1930). Military Operations: Egypt and Palestine, From June 1917 to the End of the War Part II. History of the Great War based on Official Documents by Direction of the Committee of Imperial Defence. Vol. II. accompanying Map Case (1st ed.). London: HMSO. OCLC 656066774.
- Powles, Lieut.-Col. C. Guy; Wilkie, Alexander Herbert (1922). "Chapter VI: The Capture of Jerusalem". The New Zealanders in Sinai and Palestine. Official History New Zealand's Effort in the Great War. Vol. III. Auckland: Whitcombe & Tombs. OCLC 2959465.
- Kark, Ruth (1994). American Consuls in the Holy Land, 1832–1914. Wayne State University Press. p. 131. ISBN 978-0-8143-2523-0.
- Karpat, Kemal H. (1985). Ottoman Population, 1830–1914: Demographic and Social Characteristics. University of Wisconsin Press. p. 210. ISBN 978-0-299-09160-6. "Table IV.2 Population Density per km2, and Density Rank, 1894/95 (R. 1310), "Qudūs": Rank 7, with population of 247,000 and density of 26.33 per km2; underlying source IUKTY 9075"
- Kushner, David (July 1987). "The Ottoman Governors of Palestine, 1864–1914". Middle Eastern Studies. 23 (3): 274–290. doi:10.1080/00263208708700707. JSTOR 4283185.
- Kushner, David (2005). To be governor of Jerusalem: the city and district during the time of Ali Ekrem Bey, 1906–1908. Istanbul: Isis Press. p. 96. ISBN 978-975-428-310-5.
- Mutlu, Servet (2003). "Late Ottoman population and its ethnic distribution" (PDF). Turkish Journal of Population Studies. 25. Ankara: Hacettepe University: 3–38 (see 29–31). Archived from the original (PDF) on 2015-09-18.
- Shehadeh, Lamia Rustum (2011). "The name of Syria in ancient and modern usage". In Beshara, Adel (ed.). The origins of Syrian nationhood: histories, pioneers and identity. Routledge. pp. 17-29 [see 23]. ISBN 9780415615044.
- "Turkey: Names and Areas of the Eyalets and Sanjaks of the Turkish Empire". The Popular Encyclopedia: or, Conversations Lexicon. Vol. VI. London: Blackie and Son. 1862. p. 698.
