= Mutasarrif =

Ottoman title for governors of an administrative district

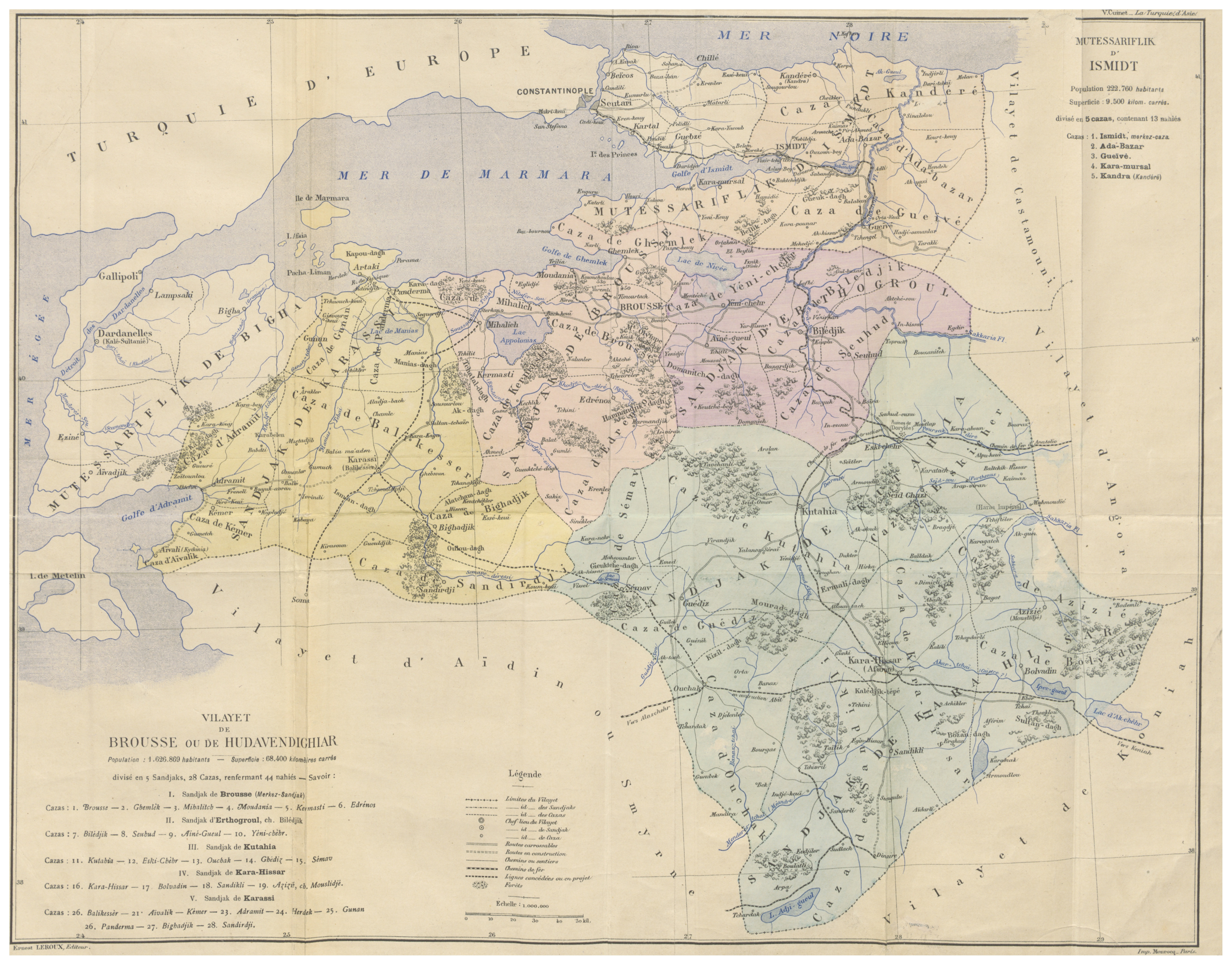
1895 map showing the Hüdavendigâr Eyalet, divided into Sanjaks, showing the separate Mutasarrifate of Biga and the Mutasarrifate of Izmit

Mutasarrif or mutesarrif (Ottoman Turkish: متصرّف, romanized: mutasarrıf, lit. 'plenipotentiary') was the title used in the Ottoman Empire and places like post-Ottoman Iraq for the governor of an administrative district in place of the usual sanjakbey. The Ottoman rank of mutasarrif was established as part of a 1864 reform, and its holder was appointed directly by the Sultan.

The administrative district under his authority, the mutasarrifate (Turkish: mutasarrıflık), was officially called a sanjak (سنجاق) in Turkish or liwa (لواء) in Arabic and Persian. A mutasarrif was subordinate to a wali or governor-general of a province, while being of superior rank to a kaymakam.

== Etymology ==
The Ottoman Turkish mutasarrıf was derived from the Arabic mutaṣarrif, meaning provincial governor, an active participle of taṣarrafa, meaning "to act without restriction".

== History ==
The Vilayet Law (1864) saw a general reorganization, with the hierarchy vilayet—sanjak—kaza—nahiye, the vilayet administrated by the Vali under whose authority was the mutasarrif of the sanjak appointed by the Sultan, the kaymakam of the kaza appointed by the Interior Ministry, the mudür of the nahiye, the muhtar of the village.

In 1867, the usage of kaymakam as a governor of a sanjak/liwa or vilayet was replaced with mutasarrıf. The administrative seat of the sanjak was in the capital, and was called mutasarrıflık.

== Mutasarrifates in the Levant ==
This administrative unit was sometimes independent (e.g., Mount Lebanon Mutasarrifate or Cyprus) and sometimes was part of a vilayet (province), administered by a vali, and contained nahiye (communes), each administered by a kaymakam. This rank was established in 1864 against the new Law of Villayets instead of rank of mutesellim which was abolished in 1842.

"This small political unit was governed by a non-Lebanese Ottoman Christian subject and given the protection of European powers. The religious communities of the district were represented by a council that dealt directly with the governor. This system provided peace and prosperity until its abolition."

The mutassarifates of the Ottoman Empire included:

- Mutasarrifate of Mount Lebanon (formed 1861)
- Mutasarrifate of Jerusalem (formed 1872)
- Mutasarrifate of Karak (formed 1894/5)
- Mutasarrifate of Izmit

== See also ==
- Mutesellim
- State organization of the Ottoman Empire
- Subdivisions of the Ottoman Empire

== Sources ==
- Çetinsaya, Gökhan (2006). The Ottoman Administration of Iraq, 1890-1908. Routledge. ISBN 978-1-134-29494-7.
