= Tripoli Sanjak =

Subdivision in the Ottoman Empire

Coordinates: 34°26′0″N 35°51′0″E

Tripoli Sanjak سنجق طرابلس الشام
- sanjak of the Ottoman Empire; Under Damascus Eyalet (1549–1579); Under Tripoli Eyalet (1579–1864); Under Syria Vilayet (1864–1888); Under Beirut Vilayet (1888–1917)
- 1549–1917
- Capital: Tripoli
- History
  - Established: 1549
  - Armistice of Mudros: 1917
Succeeded by
Occupied Enemy Territory Administration
- Today part of: Lebanon; Syria

The Tripoli Sanjak (Arabic: سنجق طرابلس الشام) was a prefecture (sanjak) of the Ottoman Empire, located in modern-day Lebanon and Syria. The city of Tripoli was the Sanjak's capital. It had a population of 175,063 in 1914.

== Subdistricts ==
The sanjak was made up of four districts (kazas):

- Kaza of Tripoli (Trablus-Şam)
- Kaza of Qalʿat al-Ḥuṣn (Hısnü'l Ekrâd)
- Kaza of Safita (Şafita)
- Kaza of Akkar
