= Acre Sanjak =

Ottoman prefecture in today's Israel

Sanjak of Acre Ottoman Turkish: سنجاق عكا, romanized: Akka Sancağı
- Sanjak of the Ottoman Empire
- 18th century–1918
- Capital: Acre
- Area
  - Coordinates: 33°00′N 35°10′E
- Historical era: Ottoman Palestine
  - Established: 18th century
  - Battle of Lake Huleh: 1771
  - Napoleon's siege: 1799
  - Egyptian siege: 1832
  - Looting of Safed: 1834
  - Galilee earthquake: 1837
  - Druze attack: 1838
  - Acre bombardment: 1840
  - Tanzimat reforms: 1864
  - Battle of Haifa: 1918
- Contained within
  - Eyalet: Sidon (before 1864)
  - Vilayet: Syria (1864–1888)
  - Vilayet: Beirut (1888–1918)
Preceded by	Succeeded by
Safed Sanjak	OETA (1918–1920); Acre Subdistrict (1920–1948)
- Today part of: Northern District of Israel

The Sanjak of Acre (Ottoman Turkish: سنجاق عكا, romanized: Akka Sancağı; Arabic: سنجق عكا), often referred as Late Ottoman Galilee, was a prefecture (sanjak) of the Ottoman Empire, located in modern-day northern Israel. The city of Acre was the Sanjak's capital.

Acre was captured by the Ottoman Sultan Selim I in 1517, but the city fell into disuse soon thereafter and was governed under the Sanjak of Safad during 16th-18th centuries. Acre was the center of the Nahiya of Acre, a subdistrict of the sanjak, which also included the villages of Buqei'a, Al-Tira, Julis, Kafr Yasif, Kabul and Shefa-'Amr. Acre was the center of a major economic boom under the leadership of Daher al-Umar during the late 18th century.

The Sanjak of Acre was created c. early 18th century as a prefecture of the Sidon Eyalet. The Sidon Eyalet later became known as the Acre Eyalet between 1775 and 1841 when Acre was designated as the eyalet's capital city. Following the promulgation of the Vilayet Law as per the then-ongoing Tanzimat, or administrative reforms, in 1864, the sanjak of Acre was annexed to the newly created Syria Vilayet. In 1888, the sanjaks of Acre, Latakia, Tripoli, Beirut, and Nablus were separated from the Syria Vilayet and transferred to the Beirut Vilayet.

== Subdistricts ==
The sanjak was made up of five districts (kazas):

- Kaza of Acre (Akka)
- Kaza of Haifa (Hayfa)
- Kaza of Safed
- Kaza of Nazareth (Nasıra)
- Kaza of Tiberias (Taberiye)
