= Karak Sanjak =

Subdivision in the Ottoman Empire

Coordinates: 31°11′0″N 35°42′0″E

Mutasarrifate of Karak متصرفية الكرك كرك متصرّفلغی
- Mutasarrifate of the Ottoman Empire
- 1895–1918
- Coat of arms
- Capital: Karak
- History
  - Established: 1895
  - Armistice of Mudros: 1918
Succeeded by
Occupied Enemy Territory Administration
- Today part of: Jordan

The Mutasarrifate of Karak (Turkish: Kerek Mutasarrıflığı، كرك متصرّفلغی; Arabic: متصرفية الكرك), also known as the Sanjak of Karak (Turkish: Kerek Sancagı، كرك سنجاغی; Arabic: سنجق الكرك), was an Ottoman district with special administrative status established in 1895, located in modern-day Jordan. The city of Karak was the district's capital. It had a population of 72,562 in 1914.

== History ==
In May 1892, a proposal was made for a regional government centered in Ma'an (previously known as Sanjak of Ma'an founded in 1579 as part of Eyalet of Damascus) which was approved in August. In mid-1895, the centre of this mutasarrifiyya was moved to Karak, marking the southernmost extent of Ottoman rule in the vilayet of Syria.

== Subdistricts ==
The Mutasarrifate of Karak was made up of four districts (kazas):

- Kaza of Karak (Kerek)
- Kaza of Al-Salt
- Kaza of Ma'an
- Kaza of Tafilah (Tafîle)
