= Hama Sanjak =

Coordinates: 35°8′0″N 36°45′0″E

Hama Sanjak Hama Sancağı سنجق حماة
- sanjak of the Ottoman Empire; Under Aleppo Eyalet (1549–1579); Under Tripoli Eyalet (1579–1864); Under Syria Vilayet (1864–1918)
- 1549–1918
- Coat of arms
- Capital: Hama
- History
  - Established: 1549
  - Armistice of Mudros: 1918
Succeeded by
Occupied Enemy Territory Administration
- Today part of: Syria

The Hama Sanjak (Arabic: سنجق حماة) was a prefecture (sanjak) of the Ottoman Empire, located in modern-day Syria. The city of Hama was the Sanjak's capital. It had a population of 200,410 in 1914. The Sanjak of Hama shared same region with Sanjak of Homs and Sanjak of Salamiyah.
