= Beirut vilayet =

First-level administrative division of the Ottoman Empire

Vilayet of Beirut Arabic: ولاية بيروت Ottoman Turkish: ولايت بيروت
- Vilayet of the Ottoman Empire
- 1888–1917
- Flag

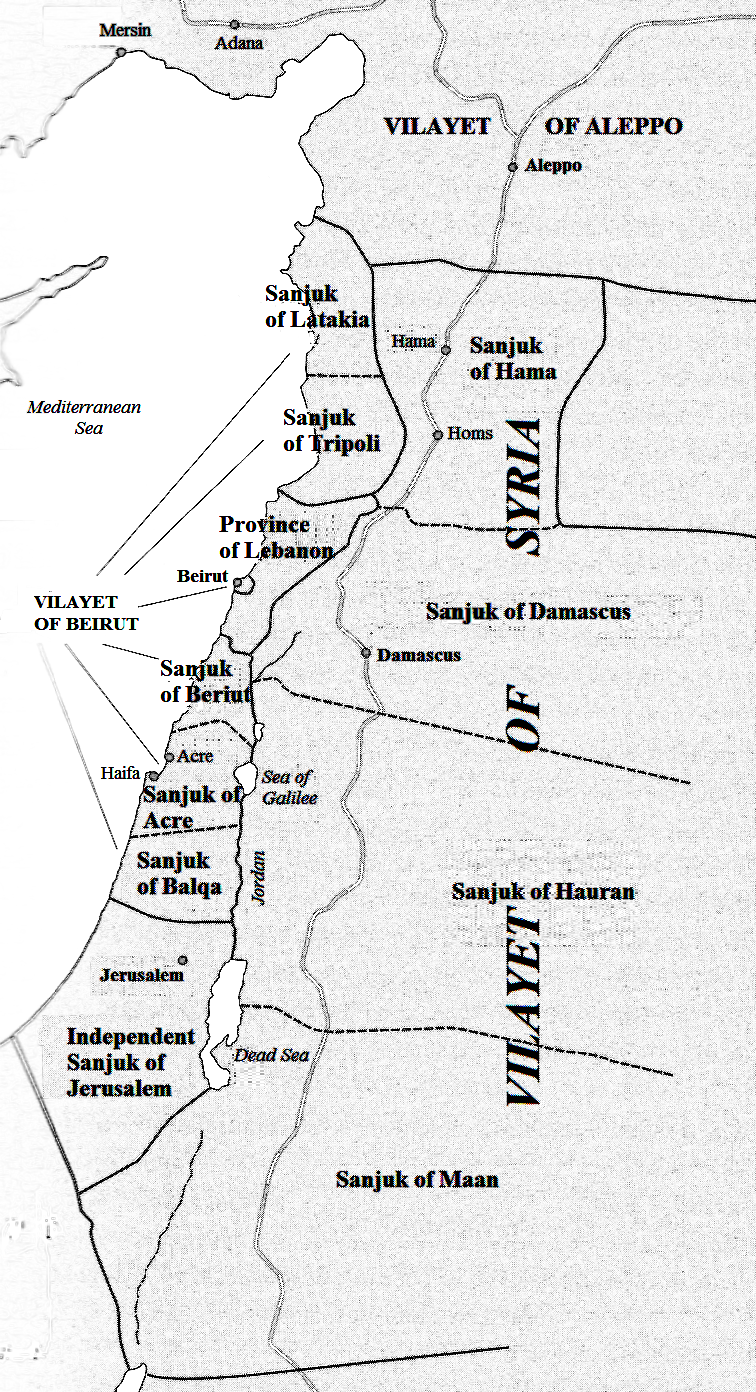
- Map of the Ottoman Levant showing the Beirut Vilayet and its Sanjaks.
- Capital: Beirut
- Area
  - 1885: 30,490 km^{2} (11,770 sq mi)
- Population
  - 1885: 533,500
- History
  - Established: 1888
  - Disestablished: 1917
Preceded by
Mount Lebanon Emirate
Tripoli Eyalet
Sidon Eyalet
Succeeded by
Occupied Enemy Territory Administration
- Today part of: Lebanon; Israel; Palestine; Syria

The Vilayet of Beirut (Ottoman Turkish: ولايت بيروت, romanized: Vilâyet-i Beyrut; Arabic: ولاية بيروت) was a first-level administrative division (vilayet) of the Ottoman Empire. It was established from the coastal areas of the Syria Vilayet in 1888 as a recognition of the new-found importance of its then-booming capital, Beirut, which had experienced remarkable growth in the previous years — by 1907, Beirut handled 11 percent of the Ottoman Empire's international trade. This expansion has been linked to wider regional processes of mobility and infrastructural development that helped integrate Beirut more closely into eastern Mediterranean economic and administrative networks. It stretched from just north of Jaffa to the port city of Latakia. It was bounded by the Syria Vilayet to the east, the Aleppo Vilayet to the north, the autonomous Mutasarrifate of Jerusalem to the south and the Mediterranean Sea to the west.

At the beginning of the 20th century, it reportedly had an area of 11,773 square miles (30,490 km^{2}), while the preliminary results of the first Ottoman census of 1885 (published in 1908) gave the population as 533,500. It was the 4th most heavily populated region of the Ottoman Empire's 36 provinces.

== Administrative divisions ==
Sanjaks of the vilayet:

1. Latakia Sanjak
2. Tripoli Sanjak
3. Beirut Sanjak
4. Acre Sanjak
5. Nablus Sanjak

== Maps ==
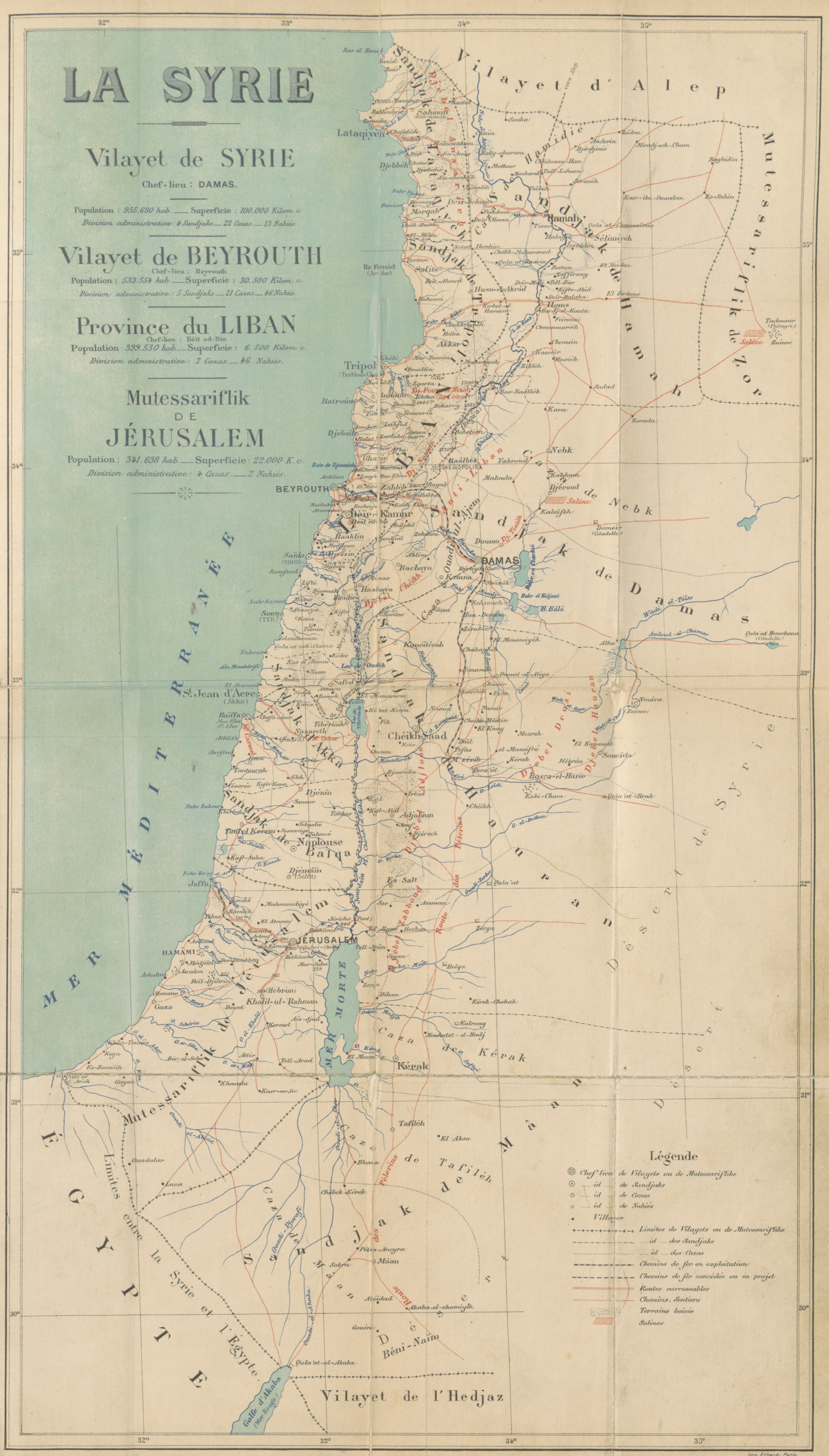
Vital Cuinet's 1896 map of the region of Syria, including the Beirut vilayet.

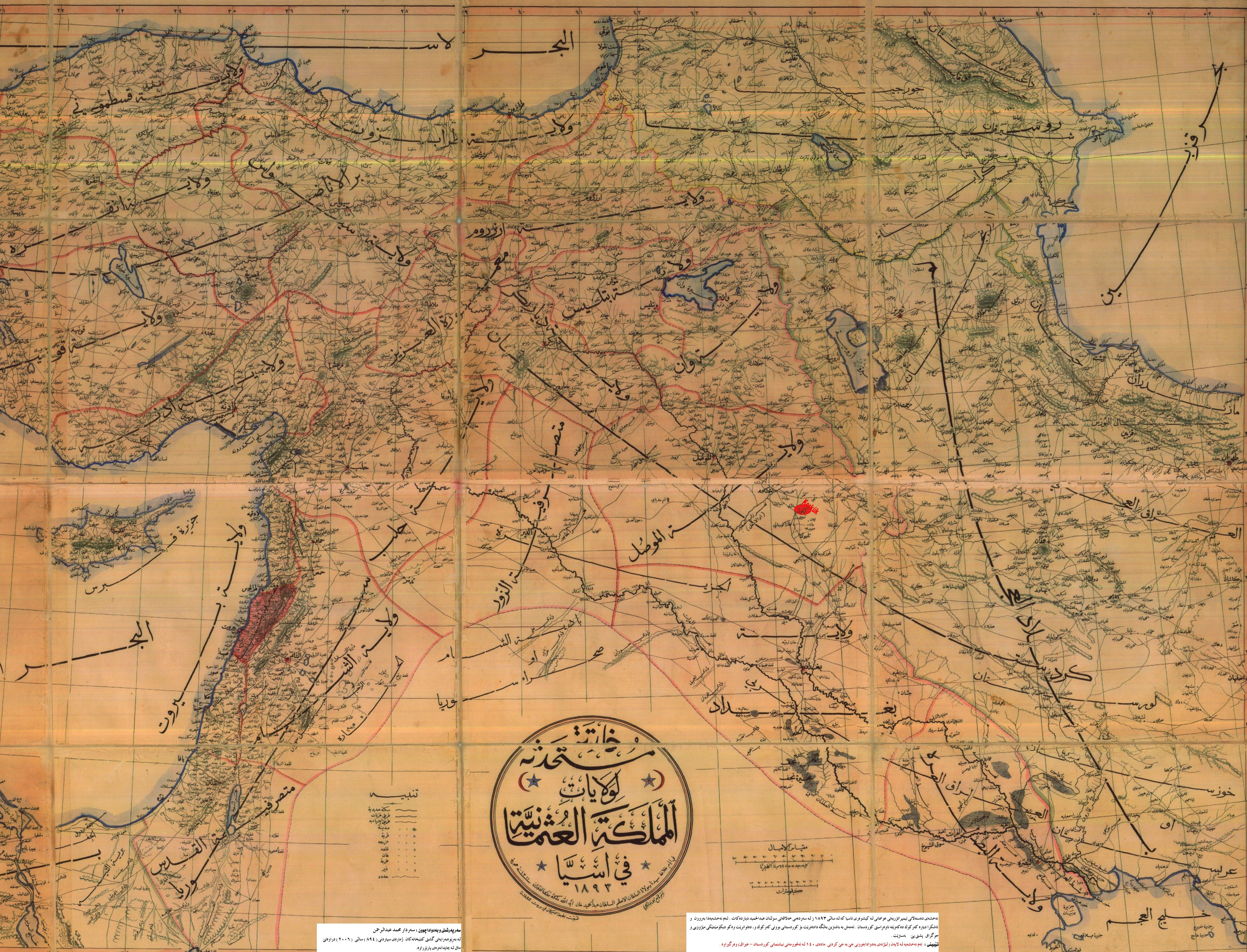
1893 map of administrative divisions of Ottoman Asia

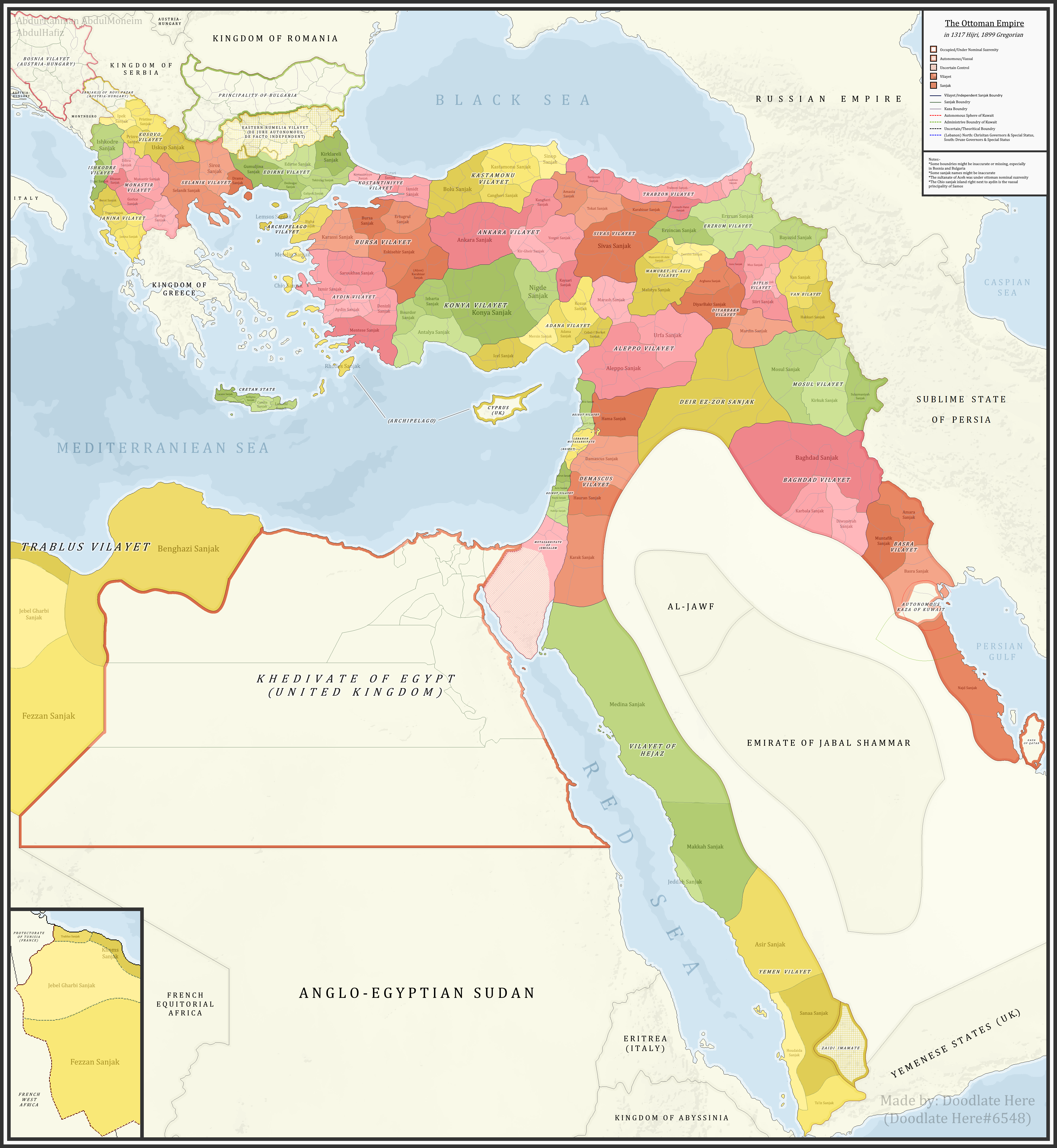
A map showing the administrative divisions of the Ottoman Empire in 1317 Hijri, 1899 Gregorian, Including the Beirut Vilayet and its Sanjaks and the Syria/Damascus Vilayet and its Sanjaks.

== See also ==
- Mount Lebanon Mutasarrifate
- Mutasarrifate of Jerusalem
