= Syria vilayet =

First-level administrative division of the Ottoman Empire

Coordinates: 33.5130°N 36.2920°E

Vilayet of Syria ولايت سوريه (in Ottoman Turkish) Vilâyet-i Sûriye ولاية سوريا (in Arabic)
- Vilayet of the Ottoman Empire
- 1865–1918
- Flag

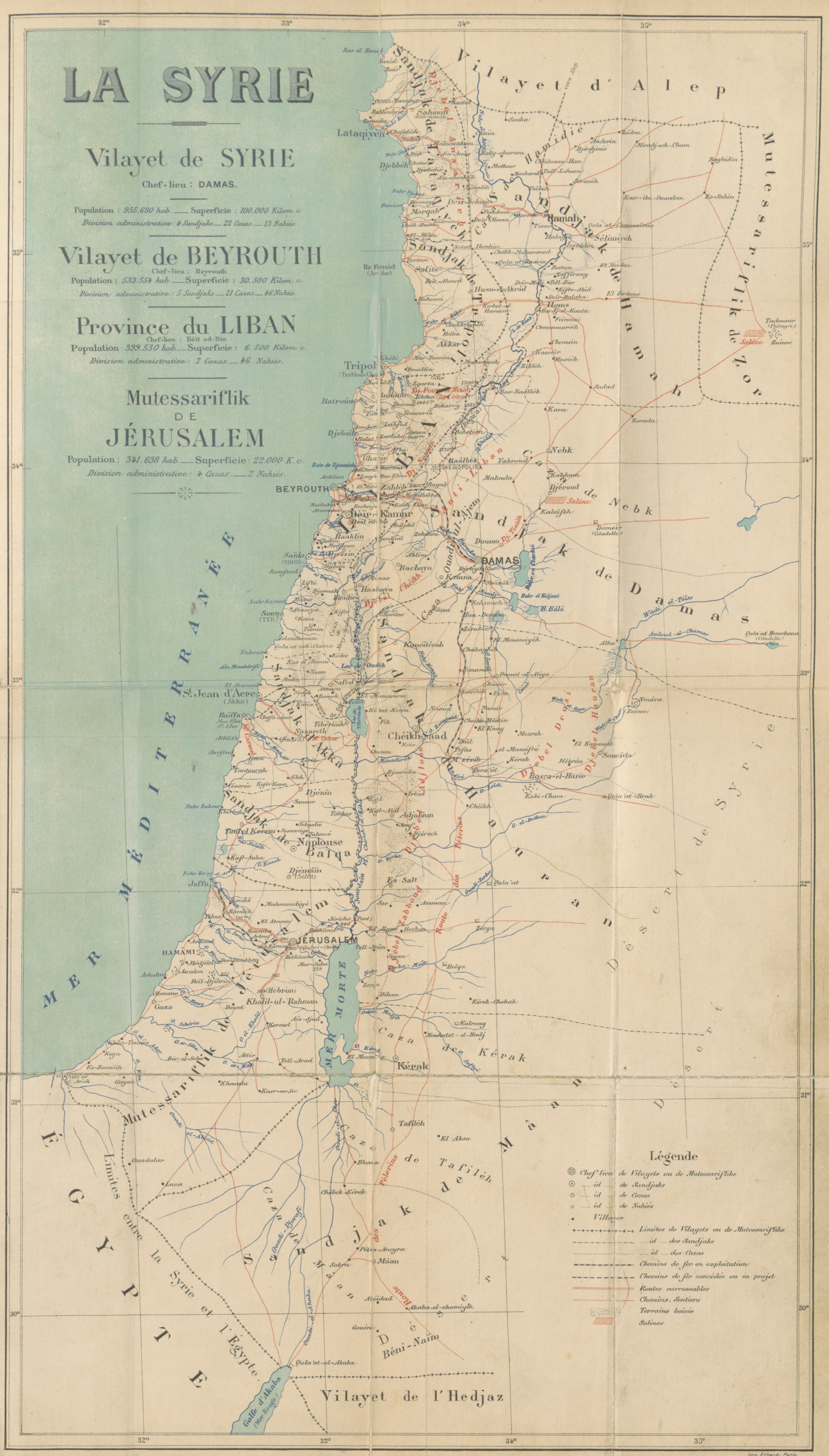
- Vital Cuinet's 1896 map of Syria, showing the Syria Vilayet divided into the sanjaks of Hama, Damascus, Hauran and Ma'an
- Capital: Damascus
- Population
  - 1897: 701,812
- History
  - Established: 1865
  - Disestablished: 1918
Preceded by
Damascus Eyalet
Sidon Eyalet
Tripoli Eyalet
Succeeded by
Occupied Enemy Territory Administration
- Today part of: Syria; Jordan; Palestine; Lebanon; Israel

The Vilayet of Syria (Arabic: ولاية سوريا; Ottoman Turkish: ولايت سوريه, romanized: Vilâyet-i Sûriye), also known as Vilayet of Damascus, was a first-level administrative division (vilayet) of the Ottoman Empire.

At the beginning of the 20th century, it reportedly had an area of 62,180 square kilometres (24,009 sq mi), while the preliminary results of the first Ottoman census of 1885 (published in 1908) gave the population as 1,000,000. The accuracy of the population figures ranges from "approximate" to "merely conjectural" depending on the region from which they were gathered.

== History ==
In 1864, the Vilayet Law was promulgated. The new provincial law was implemented in Damascus in 1865, and the reformed province was named Suriyya/Suriye, reflecting a growing historical consciousness among the local intellectuals. Jerusalem was separated from the rest of the province, and made into an independent sanjak of Jerusalem that reported directly to Istanbul, rather than Damascus. Mount Lebanon had been similarly made into a self-governing mutesarrifate in 1864.

In 1872, a new administrative region was created, with its center in Ma'an, but the costs for the new administrative unit far outweighed the revenues, and it was closed the following year. In 1884, the governor of Damascus made a proposal to establish a new vilayet of southern Syria, though nothing came out of this.

In 1888, a vilayet of Beirut was formed from the coastal areas of the vilayet of Syria. In May 1892, another proposal was made for a regional government centered in Ma'an, which was approved in August. In mid-1895, the centre of this mutasarrifiyya was moved to Karak (Mutasarrifate of Karak), marking the southernmost extent of Ottoman rule in the vilayet of Syria.

As of 1897, the Vilayet Syria was divided into four sanjaks: Damascus, Hama, Hauran and Karak. The Vilayet's capital was Damascus.

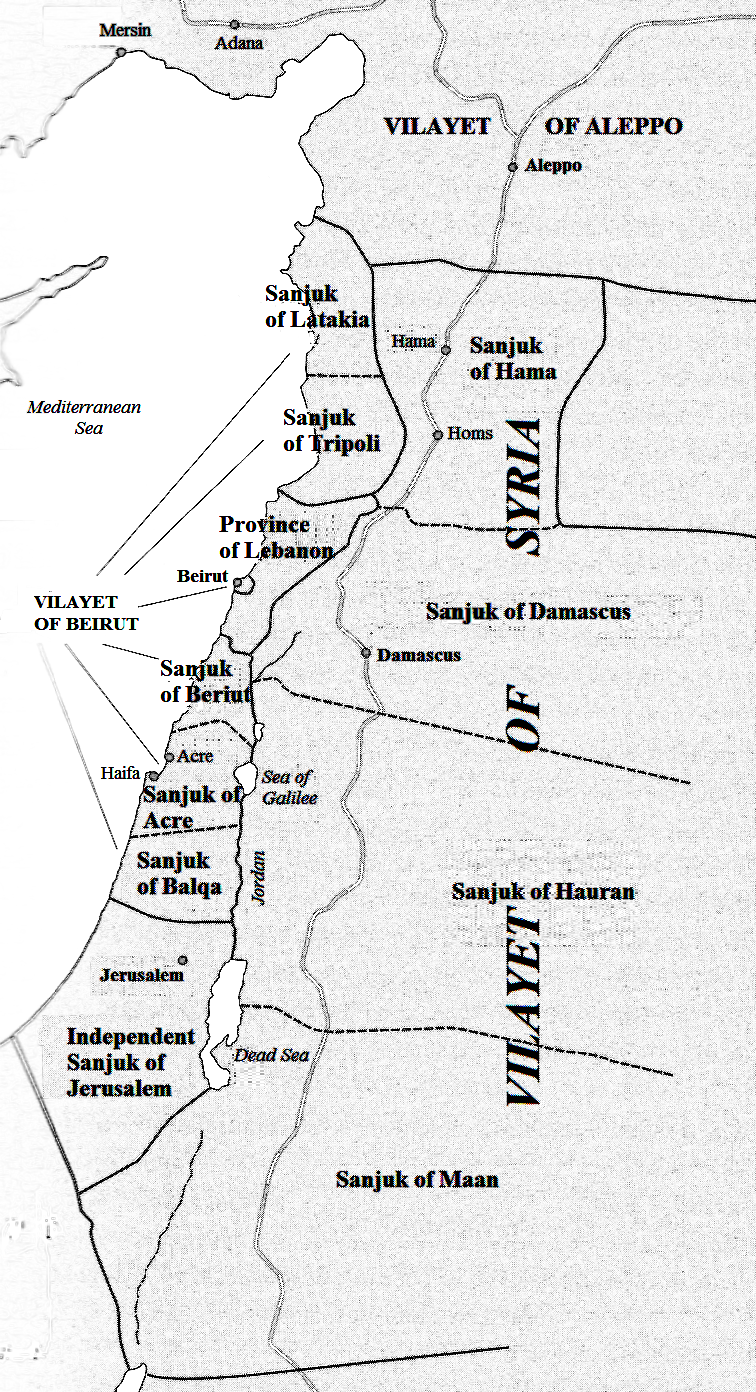
Map of Ottoman Levant showing the Beirut Vilayet and its Sanjaks and the Syria Vilayet and its Sanjaks.

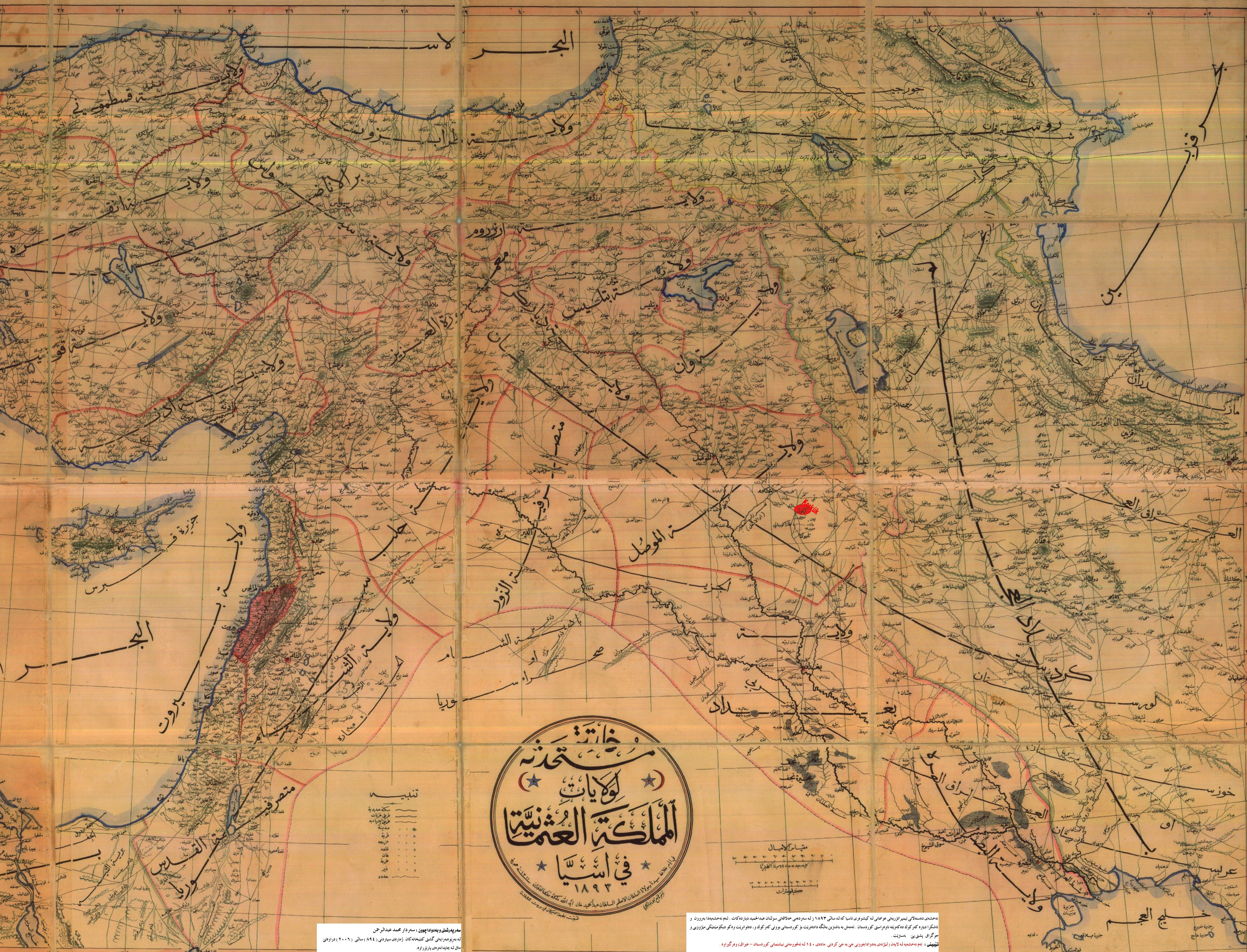
1893 map of administrative divisions of Ottoman Asia

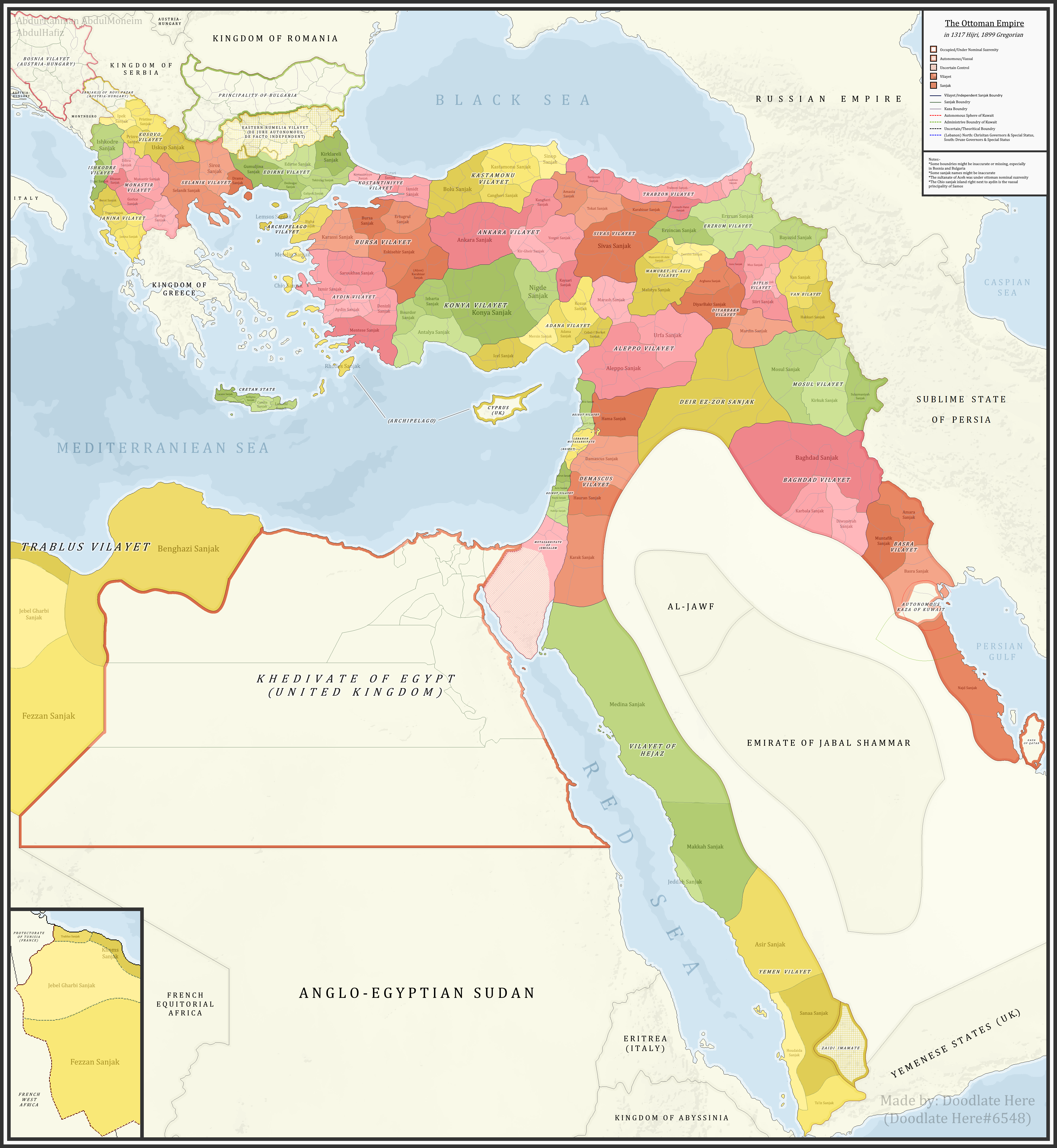
A map showing the administrative divisions of the Ottoman Empire in 1317 Hijri, 1899 Gregorian, Including the Beirut Vilayet and its Sanjaks and the Syria/Damascus Vilayet and its Sanjaks.

== See also ==
- Ottoman Syria
- Administrative divisions of the Ottoman Empire
