= Siege of Jaffa (1775) =

The Siege of Jaffa by the mamluk strongman of Egypt, Abu al-Dhahab, began on 3 April and ended with the capture of the city on 29 May from the forces of Palestine's strongman, Sheikh Daher al-Umar. The city was subsequently sacked, its men put to the sword and its women and children taken captive.

The punitive measures were intended to deter the defenders and inhabitants of other towns under Daher's control from resisting Abu al-Dhahab's forces. Indeed, the inhabitants of Daher's capital Acre evacuated in mass panic after news of Jaffa's massacre and Daher withdrew to the mountains of south Lebanon. His fortunes turned when Abu al-Dhahab suddenly died and the Egyptian army immediately retreated, allowing Daher to resume control in Acre. Nevertheless, the campaigned drained his power and in August, Daher was slain during an Ottoman naval blockade of his capital.

== Background ==
=== Control of Jaffa and southern Palestine ===
The southern districts of Palestine, namely those centered around Gaza, Ramla and Jaffa, were administratively part of the Damascus Eyalet and collectively formed the most economically important area of Palestine under Damascene jurisdiction. In the north, the Galilee and the southern Lebanon mountains formed the Sidon Eyalet. By 1770, much of Sidon, outside the city of Sidon itself, was controlled by practically autonomous local sheikhs and multazims (tax farmers) in an alliance led by the Acre-based Daher al-Umar. In the 1760s Daher extended his control to Haifa and its coastland, which administratively belonged to Damascus. This gained him the enmity of its governor, Uthman Pasha al-Kurji.

In November 1770, the increasingly independent mamluk strongman of Egypt, Ali Bey, dispatched armies to invade Syria, in alliance with Daher. The ostensible goal of the campaign was to oust their mutual foe, Uthman Pasha. By 30 November, Gaza and Ramla were captured by the Egyptian army led by Ismail Bey from Uthman Pasha's deputies. Uthman Pasha subsequently entered Jaffa on 1 December after token resistance from its inhabitants. Uthman Pasha withdrew on 9 December after Daher joined Ismail Bey in Ramla with his forces; the joint forces of Daher and Ismail Bey then occupied Jaffa, enabling Ali Bey to land reinforcements there. Gaza, Ramla and Jaffa all remained under the rebel allies' control until the mamluk army, now led by Ali Bey's veteran general Abu al-Dhahab, suddenly and rapidly withdrew to Egypt on 18 June 1771, ten days after their conquest of Damascus from Uthman Pasha's forces. Daher quickly dispatched forces to hold Jaffa, but Gaza and Ramla were restored to Uthman Pasha's subordinates. On 2 September, Daher routed Uthman Pasha's forces at the Battle of Lake Huleh and soon after occupied Sidon city. Around this time, a new contingent of troops sent by Ali Bey reoccupied Gaza, Ramla and Jaffa.

On 28 April 1772, Ali Bey was ousted from power by Abu al-Dhahab and he arrived in Gaza on 8 May, meeting Daher in Ramla a week later. The weakened position of the rebel allies was taken advantage of by local players allied to Damascus, with Muhammad Tuqan and 700–800 of his peasant warriors from Nablus occupying Jaffa and the Hebronite Abu Maraq taking over Gaza. Around June 1772, Daher and Ali Bey besieged Jaffa, viewing it as the launchpad for a reconquest of Egypt. Early on during the siege, their forces captured Gaza and Ramla. In September, a squadron of the Russian Imperial Navy under Count Orlov dispatched two Russian officers to join in the rebels' bombardment of Jaffa; one of the officers was slain. In October, about 150 Russian soldiers landed in Jaffa, but the city's defenders killed around 100 of them. Russian support for the siege thereafter ended. Daher tightened the siege in January 1773, blocking supplies from reaching Jaffa from land or sea. On 16 February 1773, the city surrendered to their forces to stave off a famine. Daher appointed his cousin and son-in-law Sheikh Karim al-Ayyubi as his deputy there. Ali Bey afterward embarked on his campaign to Egypt, but was defeated by Abu al-Dhahab and died in captivity. Afterward, Daher reinforced Karim in Jaffa with Yusuf al-Sabbagh, the son of his vizier Ibrahim al-Sabbagh, while installing a garrison in Gaza.

=== Tensions between Abu al-Dhahab, Daher and the Ottomans ===
In late 1773, Abu al-Dhahab demanded that Daher withdraw from the districts of Gaza, Ramla, Jaffa and Nablus (likely referring to the Nablus hinterland controlled by Daher's new allies, the Jarrar sheikhs) and return the treasures of Ali Bey that he allegedly left with Daher. Abu al-Dhahab claimed the aforementioned districts had been granted to him by Sultan Mustafa III as iltizam (limited-term tax farms) in 1771. Daher refused the demands and Abu al-Dhahab prepared for war. From early 1774, he levied a tax for this purpose from Egypt's villages. In the port of Damietta he marshalled foot soldiers, artillery, and munitions and in January 1775, confiscated two merchant ships there belonging to Daher.

The Ottoman government assented to Abu al-Dhahab's plans and issued notices to the Druze and Metawali emirs of the Lebanon mountains to assist in the campaign. In the meantime, Daher attempted to stave off the impending assault by reconciling with the Ottomans. In January/February 1774 he secured from the supreme army chief in Syria, Uthman Pasha al-Wakil, a pardon and the granting of a malikane (life-term tax farm) over Sidon province and the iltizam of Gaza, Ramla, Jaffa, Nablus and Jabal Ajlun. In effect, the grant was a formal recognition of Daher's authority over territories he already controlled. The arrangement with Uthman Pasha was not recognized by the incoming sultan, Abdulaziz, and progress unraveled with Uthman Pasha's dismissal in March 1774. Daher continued his outreach to the sultan, obtaining a formal pardon in January 1775. The pardon may not have reached Daher until April 1775, by which point Abu al-Dhahab had already commenced his campaign.

=== Prelude ===
Abu al-Dhahab marshaled his army at al-Adiliyah in mid-March 1775, accompanied by Egypt's Ottoman governor Mustafa Pasha and Abu al-Dhahab's lieutenant Murad Bey. The other top lieutenants, Ismail Bey and Ibrahim Bey, were left to oversee affairs in the province in Abu al-Dhahab's absence. As customary in mamluk campaigns, troop deployment was carried out in stages, beginning on 16 March with a vanguard, followed by the troops of Murad Bey the next day and Abu al-Dhahab's main force on the third day. Corresponding to the land force, Abu al-Dhahab dispatched an armada of 25 to 30 ships carrying supplies and munitions, including an English-designed cannon nicknamed 'Abu Maqlah', from Damietta.

Gaza and Ramla successively capitulated without resistance on 1 April and 2 April, respectively. According to historian Ahmad Hasan Joudah, Daher dispatched his son Sa'id to reinforce Karim in Gaza, but Sa'id instead defected to Daher's other son, Ali of Safed, who had raised a rebellion against their father since 1774 and conspired with Abu al-Dhahab. Ahead of the mamluk advance, Karim withdrew from Gaza to reinforce Jaffa's outer defenses.

== Siege and massacre ==
On 3 April, Abu al-Dhahab's army reached Jaffa. Its defenders, led by Karim and/or Yusuf al-Sabbagh, refused Abu al-Dhahab's three calls to surrender. Yusuf also refused to allow any of Jaffa's inhabitants to leave the city, including the monks of the Terre Sainte hospice, who made ten such requests. Abu al-Dhahab's troops positioned themselves so close to Jaffa's walls that its defenders were able to fire on them with their muskets while their cannon shells landed in Abu al-Dhahab's camp. Abu al-Dhahab's English cannon, meanwhile, proved of little use during the siege and he repositioned his forces further away from the city walls.

Jaffa was blocked from the rest of Daher's domains by land and sea and as the siege progressed the defenders contended with depletions of their munitions and provisions. According to Joudah, "they despaired of receiving any relief forces" from Acre. The contemporary French historian Volney cast blame on the avarice of Ibrahim al-Sabbagh for not sending supplies to Jaffa. At some point during the siege, some of the commanders of the Maghrebi mercenaries in Jaffa's garrison defected to Abu al-Dhahab. On 29 May, a mine set by one of the Englishmen in his army penetrated an opening in the walls, allowing the mamluk troops to enter the city.

Abu al-Dhahab resolved to make an example of Jaffa's defenders and inhabitants. He had the city's men executed, with the contemporary chronicler al-Jabarti commenting that neither ashraf (descendants of the prophet Muhammad), ulema (Muslim scholars), Christians nor Jews were spared. Some five hundred heads were stacked in piles facing away from Jaffa's walls to warn of the consequences of resisting his forces. According to historian Daniel Crecelius, "The memory of the severed heads lived for decades in the area, though the massacre took on exaggerated proportions with the passage of time". The women, children and a handful of adult male survivors were taken as captives. Among the killed were two priests of the Terre Sainte from Ragusa, who had provided shelter for Ibrahim al-Sabbagh's sons. The Terre Sainte hospice itself was dismantled by Abu al-Dhahab's order.

== Aftermath ==
The massacre in Jaffa spurred the panicked flight of the inhabitants of the coastal towns on Abu al-Dhahab's path. When news of the killings reached Acre on 20 May, Daher prohibited the residents from leaving, but after pressure from its Muslim and Christian a'yan (notables) during a meeting in his home on 23 May, Daher relented; the following day, he left the city as well. Daher initially relocated to Sidon, which was governed by his military chief, the Maghrebi Ahmad Agha al-Dinkizli. Daher's son Ali, who had conspired with Abu al-Dhahab, took advantage of his father's flight and took charge of Acre. He notified Abu al-Dhahab and asserted he would obey his command, while the French merchants petitioned Abu al-Dhahab for protection of their interests. Abu al-Dhahab ordered Ali to vacate. Ali withdrew, taking with him Acre's stockpiles of weapons and provisions to his fortresses in Deir Hanna and Safed. On 30 May, a small Mamluk advance force arrived by boat from Haifa and obtained Acre's capitulation on 30 May.

As the sixty-man mamluk troop was not large enough to control the city, chaos ensued. The churches were ransacked and Maghrebi mercenaries plundered whatever goods they could access. Abu al-Dhahab arrived within days and nominated Murad Bey as Acre's governor. He scoured the city for the purported hidden treasures of Daher, Ibrahim al-Sabbagh and Ali Bey, which he was convinced they had hidden in Acre, leading to his order to tear down all of the city's palaces and fortified positions. In his first meeting with the French merchants, he was reportedly unimpressed with their gifts. As Abu al-Dhahab grew impatient the treasures had not been discovered, he turned his ire toward the foreign merchants and clergy. He demanded large sums from the monks of Nazareth and ordered the demolition of the Carmelite monastery on Mount Carmel (neither of these orders took effect).

In the meantime, Ali had refused Abu al-Dhahab's summons to Acre and fled Safed; the mamluk army subsequently captured and plundered Safed, damaging its citadel. His naval forces captured Sidon and Beirut, prompting Daher's flight to the southern Lebanese mountains, where he took refuge with Metawali (local Shia Muslim) allies. Dinkizli was taken prisoner. Emissaries of the Metawalis and the Druze of Emir Yusuf Shihab paid homage to Abu al-Dhahab in Acre. In Cairo, news of Abu al-Dhahab's victory led to official celebrations in early June. The Ottoman sultan Abdulaziz vested in Abu al-Dhahab unprecedented authority, appointing him the governor of Egypt while allowing him to retain his post as shaykh al-balad ([mamluk] chief of the country) and promoting him to the rank of vizir with three plumes.

On 10 June, Abu al-Dhahab became feverish and died. His death prompted the withdrawal of his mamluk troops to Egypt the following day. While Abu al-Dhahab's Maghrebi mercenaries remained in Acre, Daher entered the city on 12 June and persuaded them to leave two days later. Dinkizli, who had been released by the mamluks during their withdrawal, helped Daher reestablish order in the city and asserted control over Ali's loyalists among the Maghrebis, who were led by Abdallah al-Wawi. Daher also resumed control of Jaffa, appointing one of his lieutenants, Muhammad Abu Ghurrah, as his deputy there.

== Bibliography ==
- Cohen, Amnon (1973). Palestine in the 18th Century: Patterns of Government and Administration. Jerusalem: The Magnes Press. ISBN 978-0-19-647903-3.
- Crecelius, Daniel (1981). A Study of the Regimes of 'Ali Bey al-Kabir and Muhammad Bey Abu al-Dhahab, 1760-1775. Minneapolis and Chicago: Bibliotheca Islamica. ISBN 0-88297-029-1.
- Haddad, George M. (1967). "The Chronicle of Abbud al-Sabbagh and the Fall of Daher al-Umar in Acre". Al-Abhath. 20: 37–44.
- Joudah, Ahmad Hasan (2013). Revolt in Palestine in the Eighteenth Century: The Era of Shaykh Zahir al-Umar (Second ed.). Piscataway, New Jersey: Gorgias Press. ISBN 978-1-4632-0002-2.
- Rafeq, Abdul-Karim (1966). The Province of Damascus, 1723–1783. Beirut: Khayats. OCLC 26512897.
