= Syrian campaigns of Ali Bey, 1770–1773 =

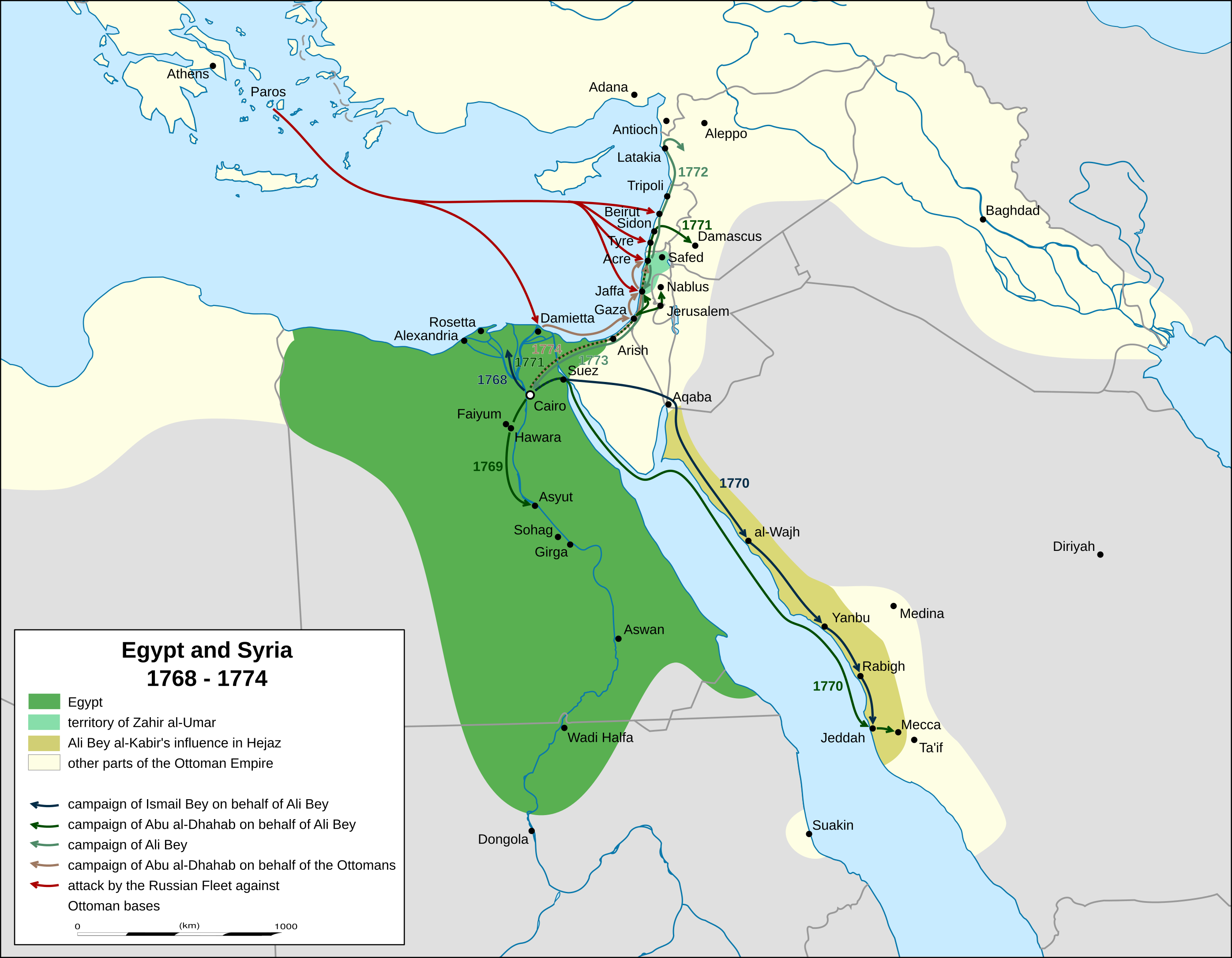
The campaigns of Ali Bey al-Kabir against the Ottomans and Abu al-Dhahab's campaign against Daher's territories in Palestine

The Syrian campaigns of Ali Bey were expeditions by armies of the mamluk ruler of Egypt, Ali Bey al-Kabir, against the Ottoman governor of Damascus in November 1770–June 1771, in alliance with Daher al-Umar, the strongman of northern Palestine. The campaigns gave Ali Bey control of southern Palestine and Damascus, temporarily reconstituting the former Mamluk empire.

The campaigns ended when the commander of Ali Bey's forces, the veteran general Abu al-Dhahab, abruptly withdrew his forces to Egypt from Damascus ten days after conquering the city. Abu al-Dhahab soon after deposed Ali Bey, who took up refuge with Daher in Acre. Ali Bey and Daher did not carry on the campaign to Damascus, but recaptured Jaffa in February 1773 and defended their interests in Palestine. With Daher's backing, Ali Bey launched an expedition to regain power in Egypt in March but was defeated and captured by Abu al-Dhahab's forces on 1 May, dying days later. In March 1775, Abu al-Dhahab launched his own Syrian campaign, this time attempting to take over of Daher's domains with the tacit support of the Ottomans.

== Background ==
The Mamluk Sultanate, the Cairo-based empire that spanned Egypt and Syria, was conquered by the Ottoman Empire in 1516–1517. Nevertheless, the mamluk (manumitted slave soldier) caste which had ruled the fallen empire, was kept in place by the Ottomans, dominated Egypt's economy, and maintained a parallel military structure alongside the Ottoman troops there. By the early 18th century, the mamluk beys (governors) had become so militarily and politically dominant in Egypt that a new governing post was inaugurated for them, that of shaykh al-balad (chief of the country). which practically superseded the Ottoman governor of Egypt. In 1760, the mamluk Ali Bey al-Kabir rose to the office of shaykh al-balad, served until his exile in 1766 and regained power in 1767. He thereafter consolidated his control of the country from rival mamluks and the lead Ottoman officials, terminating the annual tribute to the Ottoman sultan and minting coins in his own name by 1769, an effective declaration of sovereignty. Not long after, he attempted to extend his control to Syria.

In the late 1760s, Ali Bey began purchasing weapons and troops from Daher al-Umar, the Acre-based Arab multazim and strongman of northern Palestine. Daher had been in control of the Galilee, part of the Sidon Eyalet, since the 1730s–1740s and in 1761, occupied the harbor village of Haifa, sparking a crisis between him and the governor of Damascus, Uthman Pasha al-Kurji, as Haifa was under Damascene jurisdiction. Historian Daniel Crecelius considers this cooperation to be evidence that Daher and Ali Bey were "committed to joint operations". Daher had forged relations with Ali Bey during the latter's exile to Gaza in 1766, promising to support Ali Bey's return to power in Egypt as shaykh al-balad. After Ali Bey regained power in Cairo, he exiled his treasurer, the Melkite Mikha'il al-Jamal, to Acre, where Daher's chief minister, the Melkite Ibrahim al-Sabbagh, persuaded Daher to lobby Ali Bey on Mikha'il's behalf. Ali Bey agreed to reinstate Mikha'il and back Daher in his struggles with Uthman Pasha, who had already gained the enmity of Ali Bey from 1764 when they clashed in the Hejaz as each leader led their respective Hajj pilgrim caravans to Mecca. In return, Daher sent European weapons to Ali Bey in 1769. Ali Bey, seeking to expand his influence to Syria for strategic purposes, had a mutual interest in subduing Damascus. Political conditions favored the two leaders' cause, as the imperial government, bogged down in war with Russia, was not well positioned to confront a joint offensive by Ali Bey and Daher.

== First campaign under Ismail Bey ==
=== Occupation of southern Palestine ===
The campaign in Syria was inaugurated in November 1770, when Ali Bey dispatched a vanguard force under Abd al-Rahman Agha to eliminate Salit, the chief of the powerful Wuhaydat Bedouins around Gaza. Salit was lured into a trap and killed along with his brothers and sons. He followed up by dispatching land and sea expeditions, the former from Cairo under his lieutenant Ismail Bey, and the latter from Damietta on 11 November under Sulayman Bey Umar Kashif. Ismail Bey, his forces numbering 15,000 to 20,000 men, gained the immediate surrender of Gaza, whose inhabitants had chafed under the onerous governance of Uthman Pasha, drove out his mutasallim (deputy governor) and welcomed Ismail Bey. On 30 November, the next city, Ramla, similarly capitulated without resistance. Ismail Bey appointed mamluk governors to both cities and declared a reprieve from the miri tax, earmarked for the Hajj pilgrim caravans, for four years. This won the goodwill of the inhabitants of the surrounding countryside. Ali Bey gave strict instructions to his deputies not to harm the Christian communities and European merchants and sent letters promising protection to the clergy of the Terre Sainte and the French merchants in Jaffa and Ramla.

After notice from his ally, the sheikh of the Jarrar family of the Sanur fortress near Nablus, Uthman Pasha gathered an emergency force and took Jaffa (not far from Ramla), whose inhabitant leaned toward Ali Bey, on 1 December. Ismail Bey was encamped at Ramla, awaiting the arrival of Ali Bey's ally Daher al-Umar. Uthman Pasha nearly destroyed an Egyptian reconnaissance force, sending the severed heads of its troops to the Ottoman sultan as proof of his victory. Despite the morale boost among Uthman Pasha's soldiers, the arrival of Daher and his men a few days later and his warning that he would attack prompted Uthman Pasha to withdraw from Jaffa on 9 December. Afterward, Daher and Ismail Bey occupied Jaffa, allowing Ali Bey's naval troops to land there, as well as in Acre.

After Uthman Pasha's withdrawal, the offensive stalled, at least partly due to Daher falling ill and returning to Acre on 15 December. While a detachment headed by Daher's sons remained with Ismail Bey, the latter may have hesitated to move forward against Damascus in case of Daher's death and the loss of his military support. Alternatively, Daher's side may have discouraged Ismail Bey from proceeding amid Daher's illness to avoid losing influence over the Egyptian campaign. During the following two months, Ismail Bey left alone the better fortified cities and villages like Jerusalem and Sanur, which remained loyal to Uthman Pasha, as these were not obstacles to Damascus and subduing them could have bogged down his forces, detracting from his principal aim of toppling Uthman Pasha in Damascus.

=== Ali Bey's proclamation to the Damascenes ===
On 22 December 1770 a manifesto by Ali Bey addressed to the a'yan (notables) of Damascus had arrived in the city. In it, Ali Bey titled himself the qa'immaqam (governor) of Egypt and a former amir al-hajj (commander of the Hajj pilgrim caravan). He cited Uthman Pasha's alleged injustices against the Hajj pilgrims and the merchant class (both economically vital groups in Damascus) as the reason for his campaign against the governor. Ali Bey notified the ulema (religious scholarly class) of Uthman Pasha's depredations against the ulema of Gaza and the sanctioning of his campaign against Uthman Pasha by the qadis (head judges) of the four Sunni Muslim madhhabs (schools of jurisprudence) of Egypt. He requested the collaboration of the Damascenes in expelling Uthman Pasha, warning that he would do so by force regardless.

The proclamation stirred the mufti of Damascus and other notables, who notified Uthman Pasha. The latter proceeded to personally command the Hajj pilgrim caravan from Damascus on 25 January, taking extra security precautions and installing his deputy Mustafa Agha, head of the imperial janissaries as his mutasallim in Damascus. Despite widespread rumors in the city that Ali Bey's coalition would assault Uthman Pasha en route to Mecca, this never materialized. Evidently, Ismail Bey rejected Daher's plans to launch the attack, citing potential harm to the pilgrims and the consequent eliciting of God's wrath.

=== Abortive expedition against Damascus ===
In early March 1771, Ali Bey, who had continued to mobilize troops for the Syria campaign deployed 4,000 reinforcements to Ismail Bey and Daher, who had taken control of Muzayrib, a key fortified village on the Hajj caravan route in the Hauran plains south of Damascus, ostensibly to intercept Uthman Pasha on his return from Mecca with the caravan. Daher spent the interval period clearing and raiding rural areas under Damascene jurisdiction. His forces raided Quneitra and the Nu'aym Bedouins and attempted to occupy Irbid.

Uthman Pasha's son, the governor of Tripoli Muhammad Pasha al-Kurji, arrived in Damascus with 1,800 soldiers, on 5 March to lead the jarda, a military force that helped safeguard the Hajj caravan's return. None of the janissaries or irregulars stationed in Damascus agreed to accompany Muhammad Pasha. (Note: Uthman Pasha safely returned to Damascus with the Hajj caravan on 23 May, eliciting celebrations in Damascus, Sidon and Tripoli, all places where he or his sons held the governorship.) Instead, the latter, with the help of the Sardiyya Bedouins, avoided confrontation with Isma'il Bey by taking a longer alternative route through the environs of Bosra, bypassing Muzayrib. In the meantime, reinforcements arrived in Damascus led by the high-ranking governors of Aleppo, Kilis and Urfa. Their presence may have had a deterrent effect on Isma'il Bey and Daher who decamped their forces from Muzayrib. Daher returned to the Galilee and his Metawali allies returned to Jabal Amil, while Ismail Bey shifted his focus to Jabal Nablus (the hill country of Nablus). He attempted to subdue the Jarrar chief of Sanur, but this proved elusive, though he did take over Qabatiya and gained the capitulations of other rural chiefs.

== Second campaign under Abu al-Dhahab ==
=== Arrival in Palestine ===
Ali Bey marshaled a second large army in Egypt, headed by his subordinate mamluk, the accomplished general Muhammad Bey Abu al-Dhahab. Several unconfirmed reports found in Venetian correspondences indicate tensions between Ali Bey and Abu al-Dhahab and a reticence on the latter's part to take up the Syria campaign so soon after his return from an exhausting campaign in the Hejaz. Nevertheless, Abu al-Dhahab left Cairo at the head of a large army on 19 April 1771 and arrived in Ramla on 11 May or 17 May. En route, Abu al-Dhahab faced difficulties, his army, transporting cannons by camel and being hit with the plague, having to abandon some fifty cannons in the desert. In Ramla, he linked up with Ismail Bey's troops.

In contrast to his earlier reception of Ismail Bey, Daher did not welcome Abu al-Dhahab in person. Instead, he sent his son, which Abu al-Dhahab considered an insult. Daher's absence may have been an oversight due to illness, old age or busy work overseeing the fortification of Acre, but contributed to Abu al-Dhahab's later enmity with Daher. For the remainder of the campaign, Daher, though fully committed to his alliance with Ali Bey, refrained from accompanying Abu al-Dhahab. Instead, Daher's son Ali led the Zaydani and Metawali forces alongside Abu al-Dhahab. Ali Bey's coalition cleared Palestine of Uthman Pasha's troops and loyalists, save for Jerusalem and a handful of strongly fortified towns, by end of May. On 1 June, Uthman Pasha received a letter from Abu al-Dhahab warning that Ali Bey had appointed him governor of Damascus and to withdraw from the city to spare its inhabitants from war.

=== Battle at Darayya ===
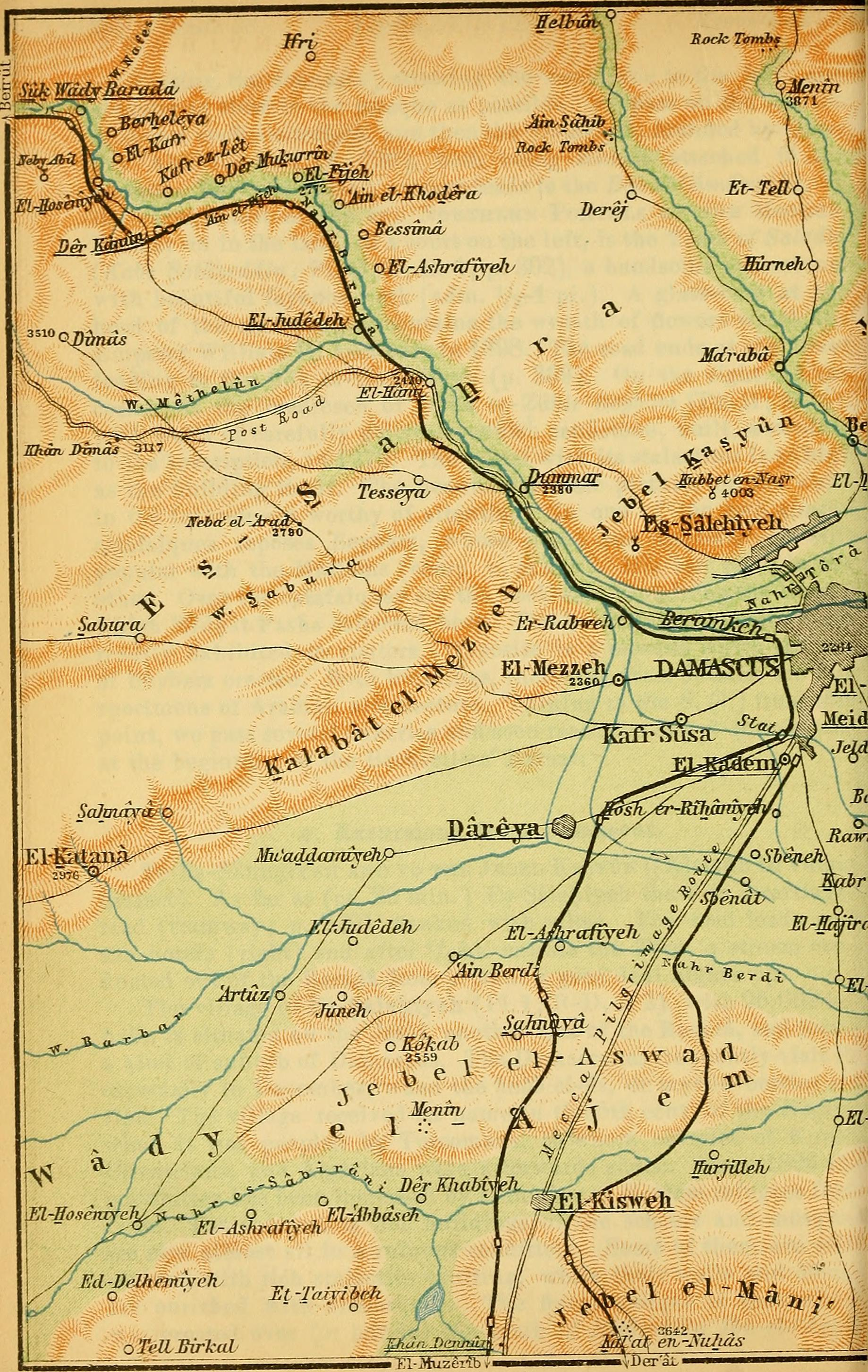
1906 map showing Darayya (Dareya) and Damascus

Abu al-Dhahab, Ismail Bey and the Zaydani and Metawali horsemen encamped in Sa'sa', a waystation between Quneitra and Damascus, on 2 June. The size of the Egyptian army was estimated at 12,000, 30,000 and 40,000 men. In addition to its core mamluk troops, it counted Turkish, Maghrebi, Indian and other mercenaries in its ranks. The mamluks had been successfully battle tested in the Hejaz and, despite being riven by factionalism, their deployment away from home fostered solidarity on the field. Unlike the mamluks, Daher's forces, led by his son Ali al-Daher, were mostly local cavalry familiar with the terrain. They consisted of the Safadiyya (fighters from Galilee) and Daher's allies, the Metawalis. Both the Zaydans and the Metawalis were motivated to score a resounding victory over Damascus, the Zaydans to further their expansionist interests and the Metawalis to secure their dominance over Sidon and their Druze rivals.

The forces ranged against Abu al-Dhahab in Damascus numbered 18,000 or 25,000. They included the troops of Aleppo and Kilis under their respective governors Abd al-Rahman Pasha and Deli Khalil Pasha, as well as those of Antakya and Aintab. According to historian Abdul-Karim Rafeq, the troops "seemed invincible to the Damascenes, and so disastrously encouraged complacency, even in ʿUthmān Pasha". They consisted of several different corps. Among them were the roughly 4,000 janissaries of Damascus, divided into provincial yerliyya, who had little experience in battle, and imperial kapikulus, who were also of little use offensively, as their responsibility was to man strategic points in the city, most importantly the Citadel of Damascus. Other local corps included the private armies of the timariot and zu'ama, who were mainly concerned with their feudal interests, and the largely Kurdish Dalatiyya and Turkmen Lawand irregulars. Even amid the impending assault by Ali Bey's coalition, the Dalatiyya and yerliyya fought against each other, while the Lawand extorted the villages of the nearby Wadi al-Ajam, prompting the peasants there to flee to Damascus, causing tensions in the city.

Uthman Pasha dispatched the governors of Aleppo and Kilis to encamp with their troops in Darayya, on the southern outskirts of the city, to counter the impending assault by Abu al-Dhahab. Abu al-Dhahab devised a trap for these troops, sending a vanguard of the Safadiyya and Metawalis led by Ali al-Daher to stage an assault against Darayya and immediately feign retreat. The plan succeeded in luring the Ottoman troops of Abd al-Rahman Pasha into pursuing Ali's forces into an artillery ambush by Abu al-Dhahab's forces. After the barrage, Abu al-Dhahab launched a full-scale assault against Abd al-Rahman Pasha, putting his troops to flight. They attempted to escape into Damascus through the outlying Maydan and Qubaybat quarters, but the inhabitants shut the gates, fearing the dispersed soldiers would raid the city. Indeed, the troops of Urfa raided the Salihiyya quarter on their retreat from Darayya. Deli Khalil Pasha had already returned to Damascus to bring in reinforcements when Ali al-Daher staged his ruse at Darayya and after the defeat, departed Damascus for Kilis on 4 June. Abd al-Rahman Pasha, who was singularly blamed for the defeat by the contemporary Damascene chronicler Ibn al-Siddiq, returned to Aleppo by 10 June.

=== Surrender of Damascus ===
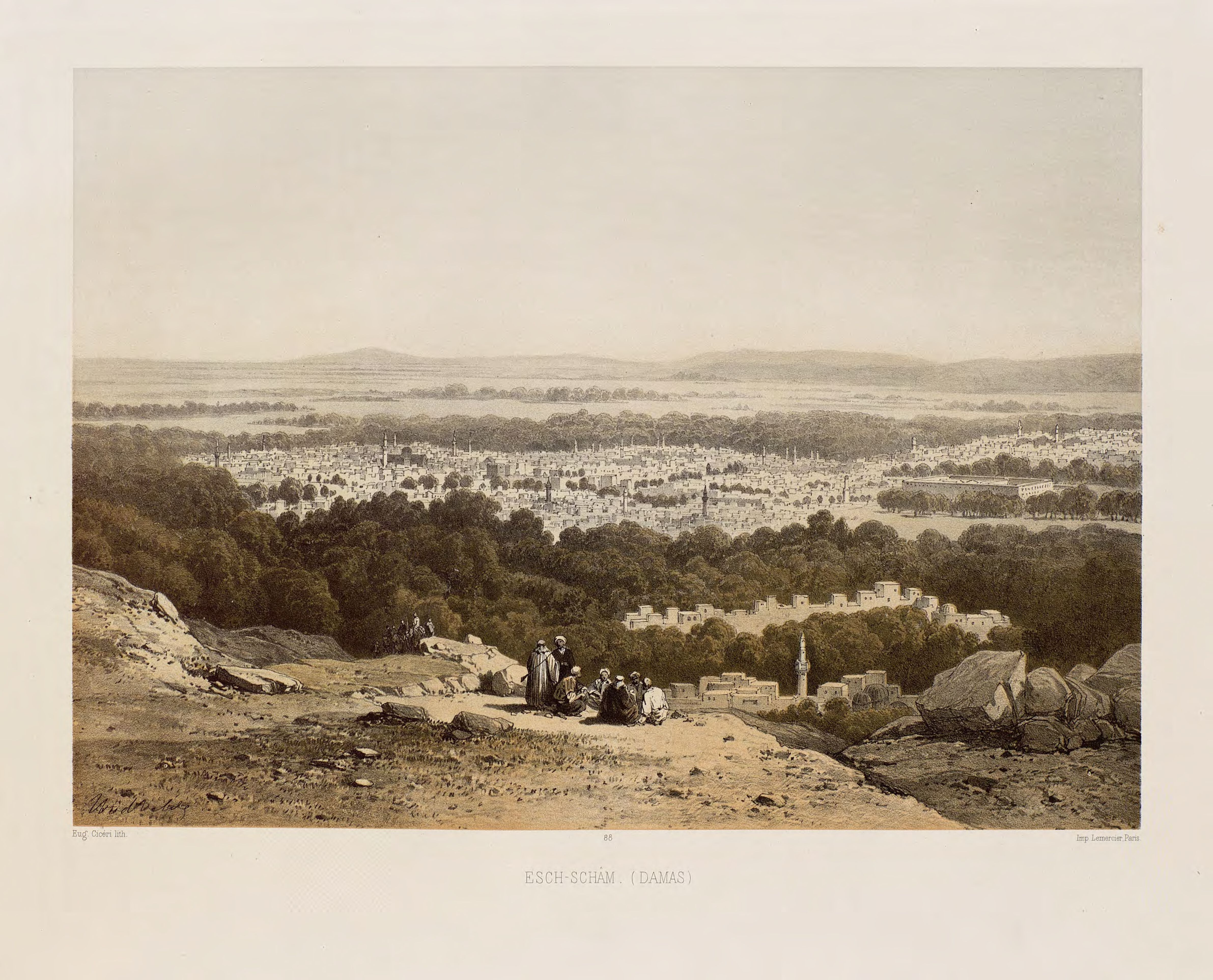
Sketch of Damascus, 1857

Between 4 June and 6 June, Abu al-Dhahab's vanguard (the Safadiyya, Metawalis and Maghrebis) forced their way into Maydan and Qubaybat through al-Qa'a Street, where defenses had been vulnerable and where they were aided by Ottoman deserters. For these two days they fought house-to-house battles with the local defenders, or awlad al-Sham (people of Damascus). Maydan experienced significant damage as a result. The vanguard reached the Bab al-Jabiya gate, but were repulsed. Despairing of hope against Abu al-Dhahab and fearing the Damascenes would turn on him to relieve the city of a damaging assault, Uthman Pasha fled to Homs on 6 June. In a bid to win over religious opinion, Abu al-Dhahab refrained from attacking on the next day, as it coincided with the Friday prayers. Instead, he corresponded and met with a delegation of the city's dignitaries, led by Ali Effendi al-Taghistani, As'ad Effendi al-Bakri and Muhammad Effendi al-Ani, at his temporary headquarters in al-Asali outside Babbila. The meeting concluded with a written promise of aman (safe conduct) for all the Damascenes and assurances of Abu al-Dhahab's loyalty to the sultan.

The janissaries in Damascus vowed to resist, but the leader of the yerliyya, Yusuf ibn Jabri, who had long coveted the governorship of Damascus, defected to Abu al-Dhahab. The latter did not receive him well, prompting Ibn Jabri to take refuge with the Druze. His flight precipitated that of the naqib al-ashraf (head of the descendants of the prophet Muhammad), As'ad Effendi al-Bakri, the Hanafi mufti, and others to flee as well. As the city's residents became aware of their notables' flight on 8 June, the city's bakeries were closed and panic ensued. The kapikulus barricaded in the citadel and the remaining notables, led by al-Taghistani, the Shafi'i mufti Muhammad al-Ghazzi, the preacher of the Umayyad Mosque Sulayman al-Mahasini, and the religious scholar Khalil al-Kamili surrendered Damascus to Abu al-Dhahab. The order of aman was proclaimed, Ali Bey's troops secured the city and commerce resumed.

Abu al-Dhahab did not take up residence in the Azm Palace, the seraya (governor's house), and consulted with the a'yan on his administrative appointments in Damascus. Upon their recommendation, he nominated Ibrahim al-Ghazzawi as the deputy mufti and promoted one of the yerliyya, Amin Agha, to head the corps. He kept as deputy qadi (head judge) Shakir Effendi. He confiscated the properties of Uthman Pasha and ordered the treasurer Uthman al-Falaqinsi to audit the finances of the city. The chief obstacle to Abu al-Dhahab's administration was the citadel, which held out under the kapikulus, who asserted they only accepted direct orders from the sultan. Abu al-Dhahab ordered its bombardment, but out of twenty-nine shells fired, only three struck the citadel, the rest landing on adjacent homes and damaging the Umayyad Mosque. The consequent outrage of the ulema and the evident ineffective results prompted Abu al-Dhahab to halt the shelling.

Ali Bey learned of his forces' capture of Damascus on 15 June and official celebrations were held in Cairo and other Egyptian cities. He mobilized further troops to advance the Syrian campaign. He had already instructed Abu al-Dhahab to conquer "as far as he liked" and there were widespread expectations that the next target of the campaign would be Aleppo, which, like Damascus, has once formed part of the Mamluk Sultanate. With the fall of Damascus, Abd al-Rahman Pasha ordered defensive measures in Aleppo. The mamluk victory caused consternation in Constantinople, still bogged down in the war with Russia, prompting the sultan to send more reinforcements to Syria. Meanwhile, the governor of Sidon, Uthman Pasha's son Darwish Pasha al-Kurji, fled in the aftermath of Abu al-Dhahab's victory and the city was occupied by Daher and his ally, the Metawali sheikh Nasif al-Nassar, or their agents; most of their fighters were still in Damascus. Their enemy, the Druze emir Yusuf Shihab, seeking to safeguard his interests, deployed his warriors to expel the Zaydani–Metawali forces from Sidon. They held the city as placeholders for Darwish Pasha. In Tripoli, the local janissaries mutinied and brigands entered the city amid the absence of Muhammad Pasha (another son of Uthman Pasha). The city's a'yan organized its defense and stymied the revolt.

=== Withdrawal to Egypt ===
With the occupation of Damascus by Ali Bey's forces "the power of the mamluk beylicate of Egypt was now at the zenith it had not enjoyed since Qansuh al-Ghuri had lost Syria in 1516", in the words of Crecelius. On 18 June 1771, Abu al-Dhahab suddenly withdrew with his troops from Damascus and made a rapid retreat to Egypt. According to Rafeq, "Nothing was more unexpected to his allies, adversaries and superiors". On 26 June, Uthman Pasha reassumed his governorship over Damascus and Ottoman reinforcements streamed into the city afterward.

The reason for Abu al-Dhahab's withdrawal is not definitively known and several explanations are offered by the contemporary or near contemporary sources; according to Rafeq, each reason contains "some truth". Chroniclers from Mount Lebanon, including Haydar al-Shihabi, claim Ismail Bey had persuaded Abu al-Dhahab of the wider ramifications of their actions, namely that a rebellion against the Ottoman sultan, especially amid the war with Christian Russia, was blasphemous. In these accounts, Ismail Bey warned Abu al-Dhahab they risked the full wrath of the sultan once the war with Russia concluded. Volney holds an Ottoman agent serving Uthman Pasha had succeeded in alienating Abu al-Dhahab from his master Ali Bey. Other explanations include that Abu al-Dhahab's failure to capture the Damascus citadel stirred him to withdraw as it could form a focal point for a wider Ottoman counteroffensive. Crecelius considers reasons to do with the citadel or Ottoman reinforcements as "the least plausible", as Abu al-Dhahab could have likely overcome these threats. The chronicler al-Jabarti cited Abu al-Dhahab's and his troops' exhaustion of faraway campaigns, having been deployed to Syria soon after arduous or lengthy campaigns in Upper Egypt then the Hejaz. In Rafeq's view, Abu al-Dhahab's own political interests in Egypt, and fears of imperial retaliation caused him to abandon the Syria campaign and reject Ali Bey's war on the Ottomans.

== Third campaign by Ali Bey ==
Daher alerted Ali Bey of Abu al-Dhahab's surprise withdrawal and demanded more troops to buttress him and his allies, now exposed to a brewing counteroffensive by Uthman Pasha and imperial reinforcements. Ali Bey, encouraged by his army's unchallenged prowess, promised Daher to send further troops to resume the campaign. In the aftermath of the withdrawal, Uthman Pasha and Daher scrambled for dominance in Palestine and the surrounding areas. While Daher took over Jaffa, Uthman Pasha reasserted control over the Beqaa Valley, Quneitra, Ramla and Gaza. Daher resolved to subdue the Jarrar sheikhs of the Sanur fortress, at least partly to demonstrate the strength of his forces and keep his fractious coalition together. This provoked Uthman Pasha into launching a campaign against Daher with backing from the Druze warriors of Yusuf Shihab. As these forces entered the Galilee, Daher's men ambushed and routed them at the Battle of Lake Huleh; most of Uthman Pasha's troops were slain or drowned in the River Jordan on their hasty retreat.

On 14 October, Daher pressured Darwish Pasha to vacate Sidon. Yusuf Shihab, an ally of Uthman Pasha, intervened and had his Druze fighters return Darwish Pasha to the city the next day. Yusuf Shihab then moved against the Metawalis, who had been encroaching on his territory. Daher and the Metawalis then defeated Yusuf Shihab in a battle at Nabatieh on 20 October and three days later, with help from Ali Bey's navy, recaptured Sidon from Darwish Pasha. Uthman Pasha and his sons were all dismissed from office. By then, Ali Bey's 700–800 reinforcements, led by Mustafa Bey al-Jawish had retaken control of Gaza, Ramla and Jaffa.

In early 1772, relations between Ali Bey and Abu al-Dhahab broke down and military pressure by the latter compelled Ali Bey to flee Cairo on 28 April for Palestine where he took up refuge with Daher. Ali Bey and Daher lacked the funds and men to resume the campaign for control of Syria, but gradually consolidated control in Palestine. They secured the assistance of the Russian Navy which bombarded Beirut on 18 June; they withdrew five days later after a substantial bribe by Yusuf Shihab. The Ottoman army commander in Damascus, Uthman Pasha al-Wakil, dispatched a force of Maghrebis under Ahmad Bey al-Jazzar to buttress Beirut's defenses to prevent the city from falling to Daher and Ali Bey.

The allies prioritized regaining control of Jaffa, which had been taken over by the pro-Ottoman Muhammad Tuqan with a troop of 700–800 peasant fighters from the Nablus countryside. Gaza, meanwhile, was taken over by another pro-Ottoman local, Abu Maraq, with the help of the Wuhaydat Bedouins. Control of Jaffa would secure Ali Bey's supply lines for his planned Egypt campaign and the allies besieged the city in June 1772. Muhammad Tuqan refortified its harbor and Abu al-Dhahab sent three supply ships to lift the siege. Famine ultimately set into the city, leading to its capitulation on 17 February 1773.

== Aftermath ==
Ali Bey's principle focus was restoring himself to power in Egypt and securing Daher's position in Palestine to protect the allies from a concerted Ottoman campaign. According to Crecelius, they realized "their respective fates were mutually dependent", as Ali Bey's failure to resume leadership of Egypt could see him and Daher "crushed between the hammer of the [Ottoman] empire and the anvil of Egypt" under Abu al-Dhahab.

With Jaffa under the allies' control, Ali Bey made preparations for retaking Egypt. The army he mobilized was estimated between 3,000 and 6,000 men, depending on the source, though all sources agree Abu al-Dhahab's force was larger by tenfold. Among the troops raised by Ali Bey were mamluk loyalists and Magrebis and hundreds of horsemen led by Daher's son Salibi and cousin Karim al-Ayyubi. A vanguard under the mamluk Ahmad Bey Tantawi captured al-Arish, opening the way for the rest of Ali Bey's forces to sweep through the Sinai Peninsula and reached the approaches of the Nile Delta. Abu al-Dhahab confronted Ali Bey in a battle at al-Salihiyya on 1 May. After initial successes, Ali Bey's forces were overcome after his Maghrebi infantry deserted the field. Tantawi and Salibi were subsequently slain, while Karim fled. Ali Bey held out in his encampment but was wounded and captured by Abu al-Dhahab's men. He died of his wounds on 8 May.

The elimination of Ali Bey had significant ramifications in Egypt, Palestine, Syria and the Ottoman Empire in general. It sealed Abu al-Dhahab's uncontested rule over Egypt and left Daher and his Metawali allies politically and militarily weakened. In March 1775, Abu al-Dhahab launched his own Syrian campaign, conquering Palestine and unseating Daher from Acre. Abu al-Dhahab's sudden death in June 1775 enabled Daher to resume control of his domains, but he was killed in August during a naval campaign by the Ottoman imperial government.

== Bibliography ==
- Crecelius, Daniel (1981). A Study of the Regimes of 'Ali Bey al-Kabir and Muhammad Bey Abu al-Dhahab, 1760-1775. Minneapolis and Chicago: Bibliotheca Islamica. ISBN 0-88297-029-1.
- Joudah, Ahmad Hasan (2013). Revolt in Palestine in the Eighteenth Century: The Era of Shaykh Zahir al-Umar (Second ed.). Gorgias Press. ISBN 978-1-4632-0002-2.
- Rafeq, Abdul-Karim (1966). The Province of Damascus, 1723–1783. Beirut: Khayats.
