= Muhammad Abu Maraq =

Muhammad Abu Maraq was a native of Palestine and an Ottoman official who governed Gaza in 1772 and then the districts of southern Palestine (Gaza, Jaffa, Ramla and Jerusalem) in 1799–1803 until he was dislodged from his Jaffa headquarters by his rival, the governor of Acre, Ahmad Pasha al-Jazzar.

== Governor in southern Palestine ==
Muhammad Abu Maraq was a native of the Hebron area in southern Palestine. His family had vied to gain power in Gaza for some time in the 18th century. In 1770, Gaza was taken over by the forces of Egypt's rebel governor, Ali Bey al-Kabir, during their expedition against the governor of Damascus (under whose jurisdiction Gaza and southern Palestine fell). When Ali Bey was driven from Egypt by his rival Abu al-Dhahab in April 1772, Abu Maraq used the opportunity to take over Gaza with the help of the Wuhaydat, a Bedouin tribe influential in the area. According to historian Abdul-Karim Rafeq, Abu Maraq had previously served as Gaza's governor. The governor of Damascus, Muhammad Pasha al-Azm then recognized him as Gaza's mutasallim (subdistrict governor). In July or August 1772, Ali Bey and his allies retook control of Gaza on their way to confront Abu al-Dhahab in Egypt.

Not long after Napoleon's abortive siege of Acre in 1799, the Ottoman imperial government under Grand Vizier Yusuf Ziya Pasha launched a military campaign to assert their authority in Egypt. The governor of Acre, Ahmad Pasha al-Jazzar, suspected the campaign was partly an attempt to dislodge him. Abu Maraq, whose brother had previously been executed by al-Jazzar, was appointed by his friend Yusuf Ziya Pasha as mutasarrif (district governor) of Jerusalem Sanjak and mutasallim of the southern Palestinian subdistricts of Gaza, Ramla and Jaffa, the last serving as his headquarters. In addition, he was given the high rank of vezir, giving him a direct relationship to the imperial government rather than to the governor of Damascus, his ostensible superior.

According to historian Thomas Philipp, the appointment was "an obvious attempt to limit al-Jazzār's power". Al-Jazzar, resolved to maintain Jaffa in his orbit for its strategic importance, moved to besiege it and dislodge Abu Maraq, eliciting the condemnation of the imperial authorities, who declared him a rebel. Abu Maraq had allied with another enemy of al-Jazzar, the Jarrar family of the Nablus countryside, reestablishing the old axis that existed between Jaffa and Nablus that had previously served as a bulwark against the prior ruler of Acre, Sheikh Daher al-Umar. Al-Jazzar opened the siege in mid-1801, despite the support for Abu Maraq from the imperial authorities. In early March 1803, Abu Maraq fled Jaffa and the city was taken over by al-Jazzar.

== Bibliography ==
- Cohen, Amnon (1973). Palestine in the 18th Century: Patterns of Government and Administration. Jerusalem: The Magnes Press. ISBN 978-0-19-647903-3.
- Joudah, Ahmad Hasan (2013). Revolt in Palestine in the Eighteenth Century: The Era of Shaykh Zahir al-Umar (Second ed.). Gorgias Press. ISBN 978-1-4632-0002-2.
- Philipp, T. (2001). Acre: The Rise and Fall of a Palestinian City, 1730–1831. Columbia University Press. ISBN 978-0-231-50603-8.
- Rafeq, A,-K. (1966). The Province of Damascus, 1723–1783. Beirut: Khayats.
