= Murad Bey =

Egyptian ruler

- مراد بك
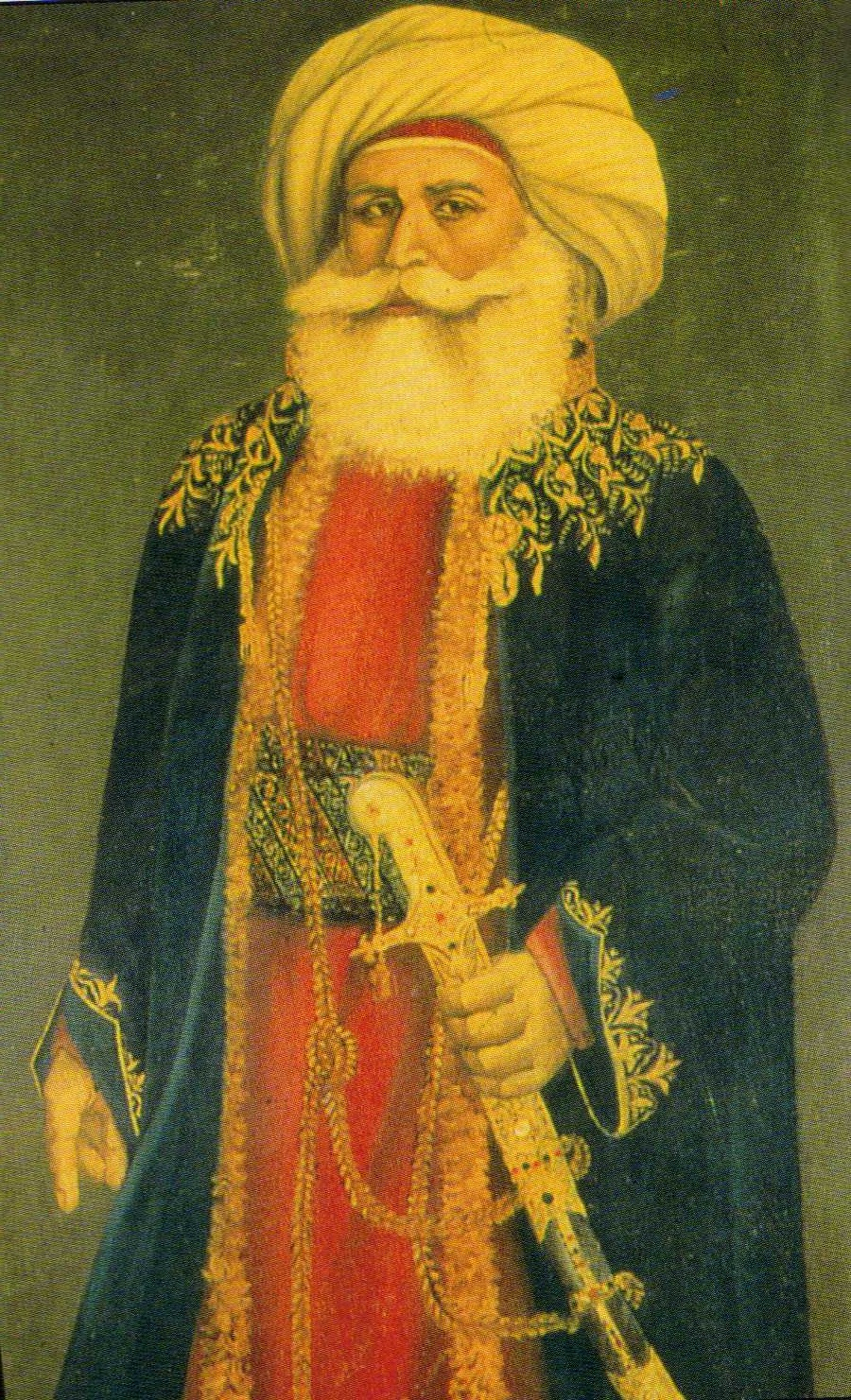

Shaykh al-Balad of Egypt (Chief of the Country) (Note: Shaykh al-Balad was the office of the highest ranking mamluk bey in 18th-century Ottoman Egypt, in effect the strongman of the province, more powerful than the Ottoman governor. The title was bestowed on its holder by the Ottoman sultan.)
- In office 10 June 1775 – 1777 Serving with Ibrahim Bey
- Governor: Izzet Mehmed Pasha
- Preceded by: Abu al-Dhahab
- Succeeded by: Ismail Bey
- In office 1778–1786 Serving with Ibrahim Bey
- Governor: Izzet Mehmed Pasha; Raif Ismail Pasha; Ibrahim Pasha; Melek Mehmed Pasha; Şerif Pasha; Silahdar Mehmed Pasha; Yeğen Mehmed Pasha
- Preceded by: Ismail Bey
- Succeeded by: Ismail Bey
- In office 1791/92–1798 Serving with Ibrahim Bey
- Governor: Ismail Pasha (Tripolitanian); Safranbolulu Izzet Mehmet Pasha; Kayserili Hacı Salih Pasha; Lokmacı Ebubekir Pasha; Abdullah Pasha al-Azm; Nasuh Pasha al-Azm
- Preceded by: Ismail Bey
- Succeeded by: Position left unclaimed

Amir al-Hajj (Commander of the Hajj pilgrimage)
- In office 1791 – c. 1798

Personal details
- Born: 1750 Tiflis, Kartli
- Died: April 22, 1801 (aged 50–51) Egypt

Military service
- Allegiance: Mamluk regime (Ottoman Egypt)
- Rank: Bey; cavalry commander; joint ruler of Egypt

Murad Bey (c. 1750 – 22 April 1801) was an Egyptian Mamluk chieftain (Bey), cavalry commander and joint ruler of Egypt with Ibrahim Bey. He is often remembered as being a cruel and extortionate ruler, but an energetic courageous fighter.

The title given to him, "Bey", denotes an elite administrative/military status of command, subject to the cultural norms of the Ottoman Empire. More specifically, the cultural norms of the Egyptian province in the Ottoman Empire, since Egypt enjoyed varying degrees of autonomy throughout the Ottoman period.

== Biography ==
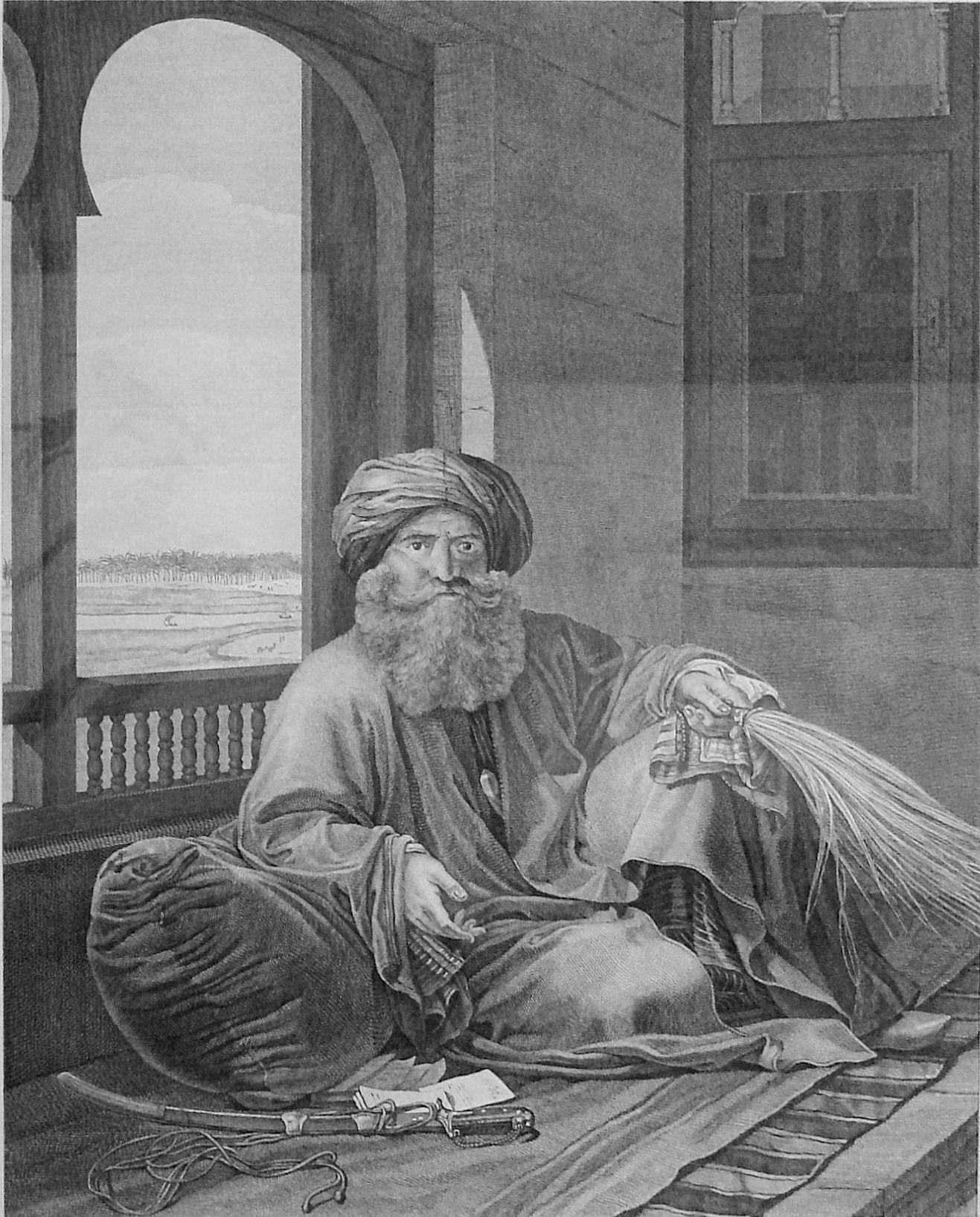
Murad Bey by Dutertre in Description de l'Egypte, 1809

While many Georgian and foreign historians claim Murad was of Georgian origin and born in Tbilisi, several others believe he was a Circassian. In 1768, he was sold to the (Circassian) Mamluk Abu al-Dhahab, regent of Ottoman Egypt.

After the death of his master in 1775, Murad Bey was in command of the Mamluk army, whereas Ibrahim Bey was in charge of the administrative duties of Egypt. They survived through the persistent Ottoman attempts at overthrowing the Mamluk regime and civil strifes. They served as kaymakams (acting governors) in Egypt on occasion, although they effectively held de facto power for decades, even over the appointed Ottoman governor of Egypt.

In 1786, the Ottoman sultan Abdülhamid I sent Kapudan Pasha (grand admiral of the Ottoman Navy) Cezayirli Gazi Hasan Pasha to drive out Ibrahim and Murad Bey. Hasan Pasha was fervent and thorough in his efforts and succeeded in the short term, reestablishing direct Ottoman Empire control over Egypt. Ismail Bey was appointed as new Mamluk leader and Shaykh al-Balad (civil governor and de facto ruler). However, in 1791, only five years after their expulsion by Hasan Pasha, the duumvirate returned to Cairo from hiding in southern Egypt and took back de facto control. At this time, Murad Bey served as the amir al-hajj (Commander of the Hajj), a position responsible for securing funds and provisions for the yearly Hajj pilgrimage and protecting it along the desert route to Mecca and Medina in the Hejaz.

Murad commanded the Mamluk cavalry and janissary infantry in the Battle of Shubra Khit on 13 July 1798, but he was defeated by the French army and withdrew from the fight. Eight days later, on 21 July, he commanded the Mamluk cavalry during the Battle of the Pyramids alongside Ibrahim Bey and was defeated by Napoleon. While Ibrahim Bey fled towards the Sinai Peninsula, Murad fled to Cairo and then Upper Egypt. He mounted a brief guerrilla warfare that staved off the armies of Louis Desaix for a year. While pursuing Murad Bey into Upper Egypt, the French discovered the monuments at Dendera, Thebes, Edfu, and Philae.

Murad had reportedly offered money to the French forces to leave Egypt. He offered to ally himself with the British Empire in exchange for allowing them to occupy Alexandria, Damietta, and Rosetta. In 1800, Murad made peace with Jean-Baptiste Kléber. He agreed to garrison Cairo. He was responsible for collecting taxes from Upper Egypt on behalf of the French First Republic. He was part of the French army at the Battle of Heliopolis, commanding his Mamluks on the French right wing. He deserted the French before the battle and did not participate in the fighting. After the French army was defeated at Canopus by a British army under Ralph Abercromby, the French governor of Cairo, Augustin Daniel Belliard, ordered Murad Bey to assist him in defending the capital. Murad set out to assist the governor but died en route of the bubonic plague.

== In fiction ==
Murad-Bey appears as a minor character in the 1819 novel Anastasius by Thomas Hope. Hope spells his name 'Mourad' and describes him as "...the second in rank [after Ibrahim] of the Beys named by Mohammed [Abu al-Dhahab]", also stating that he married Abu al-Dahab's widow after his patron's death. The end of Vol.1 and beginning of Vol. 2 of the novel takes place amid civil war in Egypt as Murad-Bey and Ibrahim-Bey vie for power with rival Mamluk leaders.

== See also ==
- Ibrahim Bey (Mamluk), his career-long partner in ruling Egypt
- Nafisa al-Bayda, his wife who served as his go-between during the French occupation
