= Ibrahim al-Sabbagh =

Ibrahim al-Sabbagh (Arabic: إبراهيم الصباغ, romanized: Ibrāhīm al-Ṣabbāgh), a physician by training, was the chief adviser of Daher al-Umar, the Acre-based sheikh and multazim (tax farmer) of northern Palestine from the early 1760s until Zahir was killed by Ottoman imperial forces in 1775. In his role, he was highly trusted by Zahir and wielded significant influence in the economic and political affairs of his sheikhdom.

== Origins and early life and career ==
Ibrahim's family, the Sabbaghs, were Arab Christians from Shuweir in Mount Lebanon. Under his father Habib, the family became known as Sabbagh, the previous generation (Ibrahim's grandfather Yuhanna) having been al-Sabigh (both words meaning 'dyer' in Arabic). Ibrahim's paternal great-grandfather was Yusuf ibn Mar'i. Ibrahim had two brothers, Ilyas and Khalil.

The Sabbaghs were members of the Melkite (Greek Catholic) Church, which split from the Greek Orthodox Church in the mid-18th century. Opposition from the Greek Orthodox clergy led many Melkites to move from the inland areas of Syria to the coasts of Syria, Palestine and Egypt. The Sabbaghs moved to the coastal towns of Beirut and Sidon. Ibrahim's father Habib and uncle Abbud were merchants and moved to Damietta in c. 1700. At that time, Damietta was a Mediterranean trading town in Egypt with a burgeoning community of Melkite merchants. Ibrahim was born in Damietta in c. 1715 and was sent to the Mar Yuhanna (St. John) monastery of Shuweir at the age of seven. There, he gained an education and eventually medical training.

Sabbagh moved to Acre, probably in the 1740s, to practice as a physician. He developed a reputation as a border-line "miracle worker", according to historian Thomas Philipp. Philipp noted of Sabbagh's repuation:

With a deft measure of insight into the human psyche, a familiarity with the human physis, considerable knowledge of medicine, and a sense for the dramatic he almost appeared to make the blind see and to resurrect the dead.

== Career under Daher al-Umar ==
=== Personal physician ===
In 1757, Sabbagh was brought in to treat the sheikh and multazim (tax farmer) of Acre and the Galilee, Daher al-Umar. Sabbagh was a friend of Daher's wazir (chief adviser) and mudabbir (manager), a fellow Melkite Yusuf Qassis. Daher's regular physician, Sulayman Suwwan, a Greek Orthodox Christian, was unable to treat Daher from the serious illness that befell, prompting Yusuf to call on Sabbagh. Sabbagh healed Daher and Qassis subsequently appointed Sabbagh to replace Suwwan.

Sabbagh was mentioned for the first time in contemporary sources in 1758, when a French letter noted that he purchased the personal items of a Frenchman, Pierre Blanc, who had recently died. The following year, Sabbagh mediated between Daher and French merchants in Acre, for which the latter paid Sabbagh handsomely. Sabbagh's profile also rose among his Melkite community when he financed the construction of the St. Andrew Church in Acre in 1760.

=== Chief adviser ===
Qassis, himself a merchant, served as Daher's agent and intermediary with the European, mostly French, cotton merchants docked in Acre, who purchased the cotton grown in Daher's domains and whose export Daher dominated. The trade was lucrative and Qassis grew wealthy managing this trade. Following an uncovered attempt to smuggle his wealth to Malta in the early 1760s, Qassis was dismissed by Daher, who appointed Sabbagh in his place as wazir and mudabbir.

Throughout the 1760s, Sabbagh's power and wealth grew to such a point that it was not quite certain any more whether he was Ẓāhir al-ʿUmar's man or vice versa", according to Philipp. In line with Daher's policy, Sabbagh vigorously pursused monopolization of the cotton trade with the French, who became ever more reliant on his good graces. The merchants condemned Sabbagh in their correspondences as a tyrant and despot influential enough to ban merchants from the port.

At some point, he began to pursue his own trade, separate from Daher's, with the port of Livorno, selling cotton and rice to the merchants there via the French merchant boats docked in Acre. In 1767, he was paying the French a two percent duty, but by 1769 he only offered to pay one percent and then reneged on the payment. This testified to the leverage Sabbagh wielded and the helplessness of the French merchants who described him as the "marchand qui tient le gouvernement d'Acre et qui y est le maître absolu" (merchant who controls the government of Acre and who is the absolute master there").

Sabbagh became the most influential figure in Daher's administration, particularly as Daher grew old. This caused consternation among Daher's sons as they viewed Sabbagh to be a barrier between them and their father and an impediment to their growing power in Daher's territory. Sabbagh was able to gain increased influence with Daher largely because of the wealth he amassed through his integral role in managing Daher's cotton monopoly. Much of this wealth was acquired through Sabbagh's own deals where he purchased cotton and other cash crops from the local farmers and sold them to the European merchants in Syria's coastal cities and to his Melkite partners in Damietta.

=== Downfall ===
On 7 August 1775, an imperial Ottoman flotilla under Hasan Pasha al-Jaza'iri blockaded Acre. Hasan Pasha's mission was to collect the tax arrears from Daher that had been accumulating since 1768 and possibly eliminate him in the process. Negotiations were opened but collapsed, with all contemporary or near-contemporary accounts attributing it disputes or sabotage by Sabbagh or Daher's military chief, the Maghrebi mercenary Ahmad Agha al-Dinkizli. Sabbagh and Dinkizli were evidently mutually hostile.

Most sources hold that Sabbagh deterred Daher from his initial intention to settle with Hasan Pasha, against the counsel of Dinkizli, who supported an accommodation without the need for a military confrontation. (Note: This version of events is cited by the contemporary or near contemporary Lebanese chronicler Haydar Ahmad al-Shihabi (1761–1835), French historian Volney (1757–1820), the Nazareth clergyman Mikha'il Qa'war, and an anonymous, likely Syrian, writer living in Egypt. Ibrahim evidently undercounted the eight ships in Hasan Pasha's flotilla, aware only of the three ships that had docked outside Haifa (the others were docked in Jaffa's harbor).) In this version of events, Dinkizli preferred to bribe Hasan Pasha and, according to the Lebanese chronicler Haydar Ahmad al-Shihabi, had secured a pardon for Daher in return for a lesser settlement of the arrears. Sabbagh argued that Daher lacked funds and that Hasan Pasha's flotilla could be repulsed, as he believed the admiral only had three ships (unaware of the other five docked outside Jaffa) and could not stage a land assault. Dinkizli disagreed and advised Daher to extract the necessary funds from Sabbagh personally. Dinkizli accused Sabbagh of having accumulated substantial wealth during the preceding fourteen years by monopolizing trade with the Europeans, selling lands, and withholding salaries and provisions from Gaza and Jaffa when they were besieged by Abu al-Dhahab in the spring of 1775. Daher sided with Sabbagh.

The other version of events, cited by Ibrahim's grandsons, Mikha'il Sabbagh and Abbud Sabbagh, holds that Daher had agreed to pay the arrears and personal sums to Hasan Pasha and the sultan but that Dinkizli betrayed Daher in the negotiations, secretly encouraging the admiral to capture Acre and confiscate the wealth of Daher and Ibrahim.

== Death ==
After the failure of the negotiations, Hasan Pasha's ships bombarded Acre and Dinkizli's men, on his order, withheld return fire. This prompted Daher to attempt an escape but was shot and killed by his Maghrebi mercenaries. Sabbagh escaped, finding refuge in a village near Tarshiha under the protection of the Metawali sheikh Qublan. The latter secured an aman (promise of safe conduct) for Sabbagh from the governor of Damascus, Muhammad Pasha al-Azm, who transferred Sabbagh to Hasan Pasha. The admiral disregarded the governor's aman. It is not clear what transpired afterward, with one version having Hasan Pasha pressuring or torturing Sabbagh to reveal the whereabouts of his hidden treasure in Acre. Hasan ultimately confiscated considerable sums and property belonging to Sabbagh there. He then brought Sabbagh with him as a prisoner to Constantinople, where he was hanged on the mast of a ship, supposedly to prevent him from informing the imperial authorities of Hasan Pasha's appropriations.

== Bibliography ==
- Crecelius, Daniel (1981). The Roots of Modern Egypt: A Study of the Regimes of 'Ali Bey Al-Kabir and Muhammad Bey Abu Al-Dhahab, 1760–1775. Minneapolis and Chicago: Bibliotheca Islamica.
- Crecelius, Daniel (2010). "Damiette and Syrian-Egyptian Trade in the Second Half of the Eighteenth Century". In Sluglett, Peter; Weber, Stefan (eds.). Syria and Bilad al-Sham under Ottoman Rule: Essays in honour of Abdul-Karim Rafeq. Leiden and Boston: Brill. pp. 155–178. ISBN 978-90-04-18193-9.
- Haddad, George M. (1967). "The Chronicle of Abbud al-Sabbagh and the Fall of Daher al-Umar of Acre". Al-Abhath. 20: 37–44.
- Joudah, Ahmad Hasan (2013). Revolt in Palestine in the Eighteenth Century: The Era of Shaykh Zahir al-Umar (Second ed.). Gorgias Press. ISBN 978-1-4632-0002-2.
- Mahdi, Muhsin S. (1995). The Thousand and One Nights. Leiden: Brill. ISBN 90-04-10204-3.
- Philipp, Thomas (1992). "Social Structure and Political Power in Acre in the 18th Century". In Philipp, Thomas (ed.). The Syrian Land in the 18th and 19th Century: The Common and the Specific in the Historical Experience. Stuttgart: Franz Steiner. pp. 91–108. ISBN 3-515-05685-8.
- Philipp, Thomas (2001). Acre: The Rise and Fall of a Palestinian City, 1730–1831. Columbia University Press. ISBN 978-0-231-50603-8.
- Rafeq, Abdul-Karim (1966). The Province of Damascus, 1723–1783. Beirut: Khayats.
