= Ibrahim Bey (Mamluk) =

Mamluk chieftain (1735–1816/1817)

- Abram Shinjikashvili (აბრამ შინჯიკაშვილი)
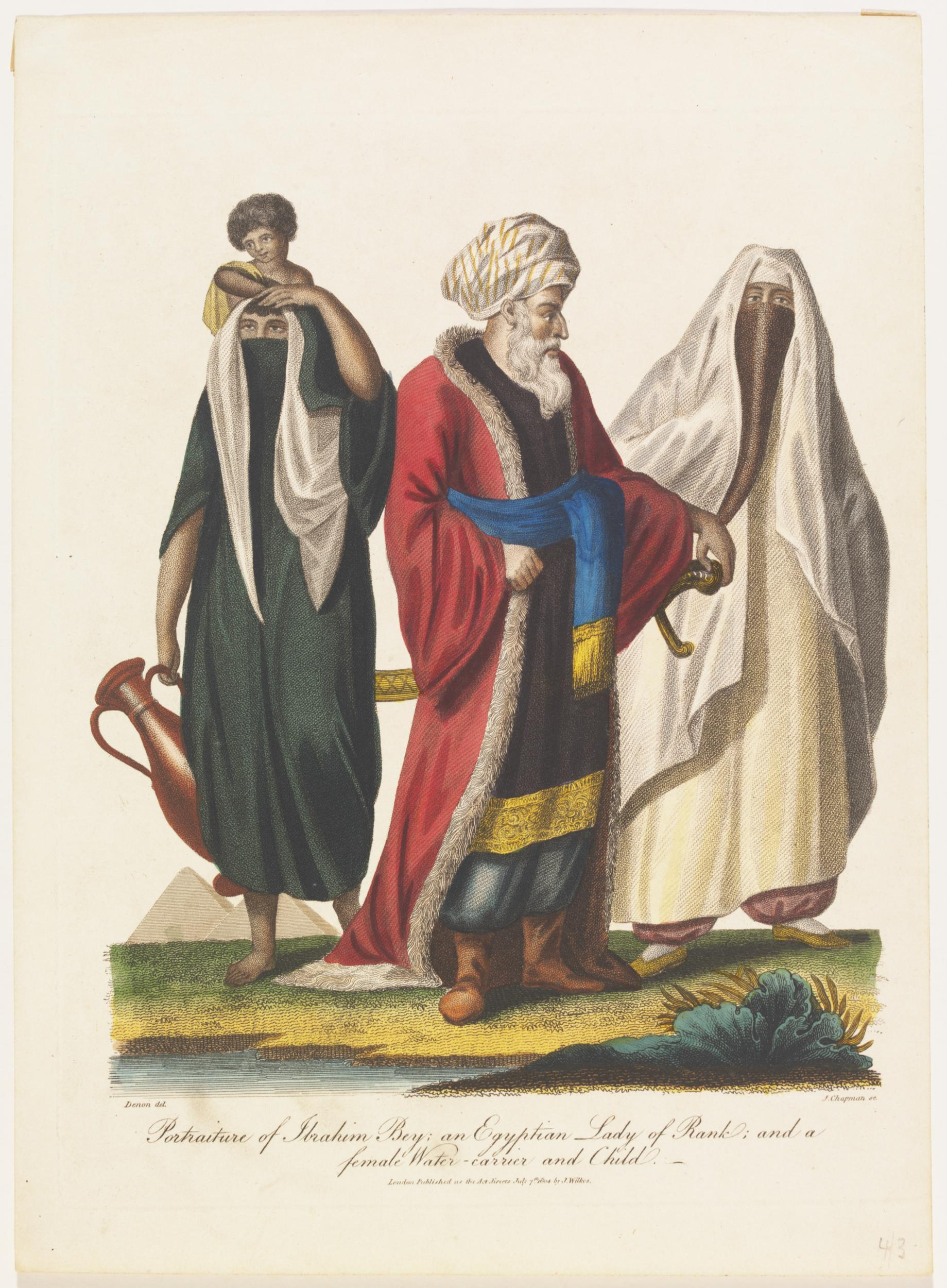
- 1804 portrait of Ibrahim Bey (Center)

Shaykh al-Balad of Egypt (Chief of the Country) (Note: Shaykh al-Balad was the office of the highest ranking mamluk bey in 18th-century Ottoman Egypt, in effect the strongman of the province, more powerful than the Ottoman governor. The title was bestowed on its holder by the Ottoman sultan.) Regent of Egypt
- In office 10 June 1775 – 1777 Serving with Murad Bey
- Governor: Izzet Mehmed Pasha
- Preceded by: Abu al-Dhahab
- Succeeded by: Ismail Bey
- In office 1778–1786 Serving with Murad Bey
- Governor: Izzet Mehmed Pasha; Raif Ismail Pasha; Ibrahim Pasha; Melek Mehmed Pasha; Şerif Pasha; Silahdar Mehmed Pasha; Yeğen Mehmed Pasha
- Preceded by: Ismail Bey
- Succeeded by: Ismail Bey
- In office 1791/92 – 1798 (rule); 1798—1800 (claimancy) Serving with Murad Bey
- Governor: Ismail Pasha (Tripolitanian); Safranbolulu Izzet Mehmet Pasha; Kayserili Hacı Salih Pasha; Lokmacı Ebubekir Pasha; Abdullah Pasha al-Azm; Nasuh Pasha al-Azm
- Preceded by: Ismail Bey
- Succeeded by: Position left unclaimed

Ottoman Governor of Egypt
- In office 1803–1804
- Monarchs: Selim III (de jure); Muhammad Ali (de facto)

Personal details
- Born: Abram Shinjikashvili; 1735 Martqopi, Kakheti, Georgia
- Died: 1816/1817 Dongola, Egypt Eyalet, Ottoman Empire
- Cause of death: Natural causes
- Religion: Eastern Orthodoxy; Islam

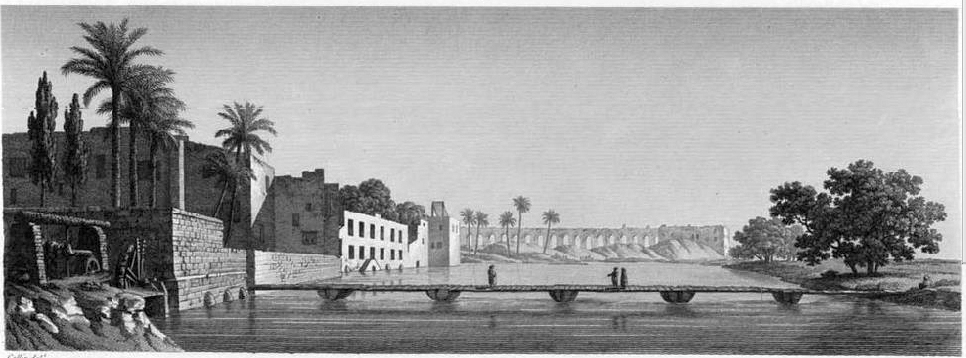
Ibrahim Bey's mansion on Al-Rudah Island, near Cairo

Ibrahim Bey (born Abram Shinjikashvili; 1735 – 1816/1817) was an Egyptian Mamluk chieftain and regent of Egypt.

== Biography ==
Ibrahim Bey was born as Abram Shinjikashvili (აბრამ შინჯიკაშვილი), of Georgian origin, into the family of an Orthodox Christian priest in Martqopi in the southeastern Georgian province of Kakheti. As a child, he was captured by Ottoman slave raiders and sold out in Egypt where he was converted to Islam and trained as a Mamluk. Through loyal service to Muhammad Bey Abu al-Dhahab, the Mamluk ruler of Egypt, he rose in rank and attained to the dignity of bey.

With time he emerged as one of the most influential Mamluk commanders, sharing a de facto control of Egypt with his fellow Murad Bey. The two men became a duumvirate, Murad Bey managing military matters while Ibrahim Bey managed civil administration. They survived through the persistent Ottoman attempts at overthrowing the Mamluk regime and civil strifes. They served as kaymakams (acting governors) in Egypt on occasion, although they effectively held de facto power for decades, even over the appointed Ottoman governor of Egypt. From 1771 to 1773, Ibrahim Bey served as the amir al-hajj (commander of the hajj caravan) of Egypt.

In 1786, the Ottoman sultan Abdul Hamid I sent Kapudan Pasha (grand admiral of the Ottoman Navy) Cezayirli Gazi Hasan Pasha to drive out Ibrahim and Murad Bey in the Egypt Campaign (1786-1787). Hasan Pasha was fervent and thorough in his efforts and succeeded in the short term, reestablishing direct Ottoman Empire control over Egypt. Ismail Bey was appointed as new Mamluk leader and Shaykh al-Balad (civil governor and de facto ruler). However, in 1792, only six years after their expulsion by Hasan Pasha, the duumvirate returned to Cairo from hiding in southern Egypt and took back de facto control.

When the French invaded Egypt in 1798, Ibrahim fought against Napoleon's armies at the battles of the Pyramids, Salahieh (11 August 1798), and Heliopolis but was defeated on each occasion. Though the French eventually withdrew from Egypt in defeat, the battle defeats of the Pyramids and Heliopolis effectively ended his reign over the country, and he died in obscurity in 1816 or 1817, having survived Mohammad Ali Pasha's 1811 massacre of Mamluk leaders.

== In fiction ==
Ibrahim-Bey appears as a minor character in the 1819 novel Anastasius by Thomas Hope. Hope describes him as "...the eldest Bey of his [Abu al-Dhahab's] creation", also stating that he "obtained with the place of Schaich-el-Belled the widow of Aly [Ali Bey al-Kabir]" after Abu al-Dahab's death. The end of Vol.1 and beginning of Vol. 2 of the novel takes place amid civil war in Egypt as Murad-Bey and Ibrahim-Bey vie for power with rival Mamluk leaders in the aftermath of the death of Ali Bey al-Kabir.

== See also ==
- Murad Bey, Ibrahim's career-long partner in ruling Egypt
- Saqaliba
