= Uthman Pasha al-Wakil =

Uthman Pasha al-Wakil, spelled in Turkish as Vekil Osman Pasha, also commonly referred to as Uthman Pasha al-Misri, was an Ottoman military official who served as serasker i-Arabistan (supreme commander of the army in Arabistan, an alternative name for Syria) and vekil-i sultan (deputy or representative of the sultan) in Syria in December 1771–July 1774. Despite the powerful position his office and rank commanded, Uthman Pasha chronically lacked troops and funds, due to the Ottomans being preoccupied by war with Russia (1768–1774). He took few military initiatives and mostly attempted to negotiate with the rebel chiefs who controlled large parts of Syria and Palestine (chiefly Sheikh Daher al-Umar) in concert with the rebel leader of Egypt, Ali Bey al-Kabir, and the Russians.

== Career ==
Uthman held the rank of agha and served as the wakil (vekil in Turkish) of the kizlar agha (chief black eunuch) of Egypt. Among the latter's roles was to supervise the funds earmarked for the benefit of the Islamic holy sites in Mecca and Medina. During the consolidation of power in Egypt by the mamluk shaykh al-balad Ali Bey al-Kabir, Uthman was expelled from the province and Ali Bey confiscated 10,000 purses from him.

After his expulsion from Egypt, Uthman took up residence in Medina. He gained the epithets al-Misri (lit. 'the Egyptian') from his time in Egypt and al-wakil from the former office he held there. Sultan Mustafa III (r. 1757–1774) instructed him to move to Damascus in the early 1770s, during the closing months of Uthman Pasha al-Kurji's governorship, when the governor was embroiled in conflict with Ali Bey and his ally in Palestine, the powerful Arab sheikh Daher al-Umar. The sultan's intention was to appoint Uthman Pasha al-Wakil as both serasker and beylerbey (governor) of Egypt, where he was popular; the appointment to Egypt never occurred.

=== Supreme commander of the army in Syria ===
Instead, Uthman Pasha al-Wakil, who had been residing in wait in the neighborhood of Qanawat, was promoted to the rank of vezir and appointed to replace Nu'man Pasha as serasker of Damascus on 21 December 1771. Although some later sources misinterpreted it as an appointment to the governorship of Damascus, that office was held instead by Muhammad Pasha al-Azm. As serasker, Uthman Pasha's role superseded that of the governor, particularly in military matters. He also resided in the governor's palace, the seraya, as the governor had been leading the Hajj pilgrimage.

Although the extraordinary presence of a serasker in Damascus suggested the Ottoman imperial government was strongly reinforcing Damascene authority against Ali Bey's encroachments and the many rebel chiefs in and around the province, in reality Uthman Pasha lacked either an army or the necessary funds to tackle these challenges. The Ottomans had been bogged down in a war with the Russian Empire since 1768, diverting imperial attention from the provinces. As such, Uthman Pasha and Muhammad Pasha had little choice but to play for time and negotiate with Daher al-Umar, who controlled or dominated much of Palestine, the province of Sidon and the Hauran plain leading to Damascus.

Ali Bey was driven out of Egypt in 1772 and took refuge with Daher in Acre. Daher's forces, which included the Shia Metawalis, prepared to move against the port town of Beirut with the support of the Russian navy. Upon the request of Yusuf Shihab, the paramount emir of the Druze in Mount Lebanon and opponent of Daher, Uthman Pasha dispatched Ahmad Bey al-Jazzar at the head of troop of Maghrebi mercenaries to protect Beirut. Daher and Yusuf Shihab reconciled and joined forces in 1773. Uthman Pasha sent an expedition against the Druze that was defeated by Yusuf Shihab, the Metawalis and Daher's son Ali in the Beqaa Valley in August. The allied rebels then captured Beirut with Russian naval support on September 30.

Unable to suppress the rebels by military means, Uthman Pasha renewed negotiations with Daher. An agreement between them was mediated by the Metawali sheikh Qabalan and an official, Husayn Effendi. As part of the agreement, Uthman Pasha awarded Daher the malikane of Sidon in return for payment of 1,000 purses to cover his tax arrears and the annual payment of 450 purses from then on, as well as the customary funds Sidon's governor paid toward the Hajj pilgrimage caravan. The new sultan, Abdul Hamid I (r. 1774–1789) did not affirm this agreement, limiting himself to granting Daher an aman (pardon). In c. July 1774, Uthman Pasha was relieved of his post, and appointed as governor of Aleppo. He remained in Damascus as the acting serasker and appointed a mütesellim (deputy governor) to Aleppo until Muhammad Pasha took up the office of serasker.

== Bibliography ==
- Cohen, Amnon (1973). Palestine in the 18th Century: Patterns of Government and Administration. Jerusalem: The Magnes Press. ISBN 978-0-19-647903-3.
- Joudah, Ahmad Hasan (2013). Revolt in Palestine in the Eighteenth Century: The Era of Shaykh Zahir al-Umar (Second ed.). Gorgias Press. ISBN 978-1-4632-0002-2.
- Rafeq, Abdul-Karim (1966). The Province of Damascus, 1723–1783. Beirut: Khayats.
