= Abu al-Dhahab =

Mamluk emir and regent of Ottoman Egypt (1735-1775)

Muhammad Bey Abu al-Dhahab

Governor of Damascus (Note: On 1 June, Uthman Pasha received a letter from Abu al-Dhahab warning that Ali Bey had appointed him governor of Damascus and to withdraw from the city to spare its inhabitants from war. After a battle at Darayya, notables, led by al-Taghistani, the Shafi'i mufti Muhammad al-Ghazzi, the preacher of the Umayyad Mosque Sulayman al-Mahasini, and the religious scholar Khalil al-Kamili surrendered Damascus to Abu al-Dhahab. The order of aman was proclaimed, Ali Bey's troops secured the city and commerce resumed. Abu al-Dhahab left Damascus on 18 June 1771 to incite a rebellion against Ali bey.)
- In office 8 June 1771 – 18 June 1771
- Appointed by: Ali Bey al-Kabir
- Monarch: Ali Bey al-Kabir
- Preceded by: Uthman Pasha al-Kurji (as Ottoman Governer)
- Succeeded by: Uthman Pasha al-Kurji (as Ottoman Governer)

Shaykh al-Balad of Egypt (Chief of the Country) (Note: Shaykh al-Balad was the office of the highest ranking mamluk bey in 18th-century Ottoman Egypt, in effect the strongman of the province, more powerful than the Ottoman governor. The title was bestowed on its holder by the Ottoman sultan. However, from 1769, when Ali Bey al-Kabir declared independence from the Ottoman Empire, it became the title of the supreme leader of Egypt. Its use continued even after the Ottoman reconquest of Egypt by Cezayirli Gazi Hasan Pasha.) Sultan of Egypt
- In office 28 April 1772 – 10 June 1775
- Monarch: Himself (Note: Sometimes as a nominal subordinate of the Ottoman sultan.)
- Governor: Uthman Pasha al-Wakil; Kara Halil Pasha; Hacı Ibrahim Pasha; Himself
- Preceded by: Ali Bey al-Kabir
- Succeeded by: Disputed: Ismail Bey; Ibrahim Bey and Murad Bey

Ottoman Governer of Egypt Ottoman Vizier (Note: The Ottoman sultan Abdul Hamid I vested in Abu al-Dhahab unprecedented authority, appointing him the governor of Egypt while allowing him to retain his post as shaykh al-balad ([mamluk] chief of the country) and promoting him to the rank of vizir with three plumes.)
- In office June 1775 – 10 June 1775
- Appointed by: Abdul Hamid I
- Monarchs: Abdul Hamid I (de jure); Himself (de facto)
- Preceded by: Hacı Ibrahim Pasha
- Succeeded by: Izzet Mehmed Pasha

Personal details
- Born: Circassia/Abkhazia, North Caucasus
- Died: 10 June 1775 Jaffa, Gaza Sanjak, Damascus Eyalet, Ottoman Empire
- Nickname: Father of Gold
- Military career
- Allegiance: Ali Bey al-Kabir (until 1772)
- Rank: General officer
- Conflicts: Ali Bey's Succession Conflicts; Wars of the Beylik of Egypt.; Pro-Ottoman Revolts in Egypt; Subjugation of the Hawwara; Campaigns in the Hejaz; Second Syrian Campaign; Abu al-Dhahab's Mutiny; Ali Bey's Insurgency in Egypt and Syria; Syrian Campaign of Abu Dhahab

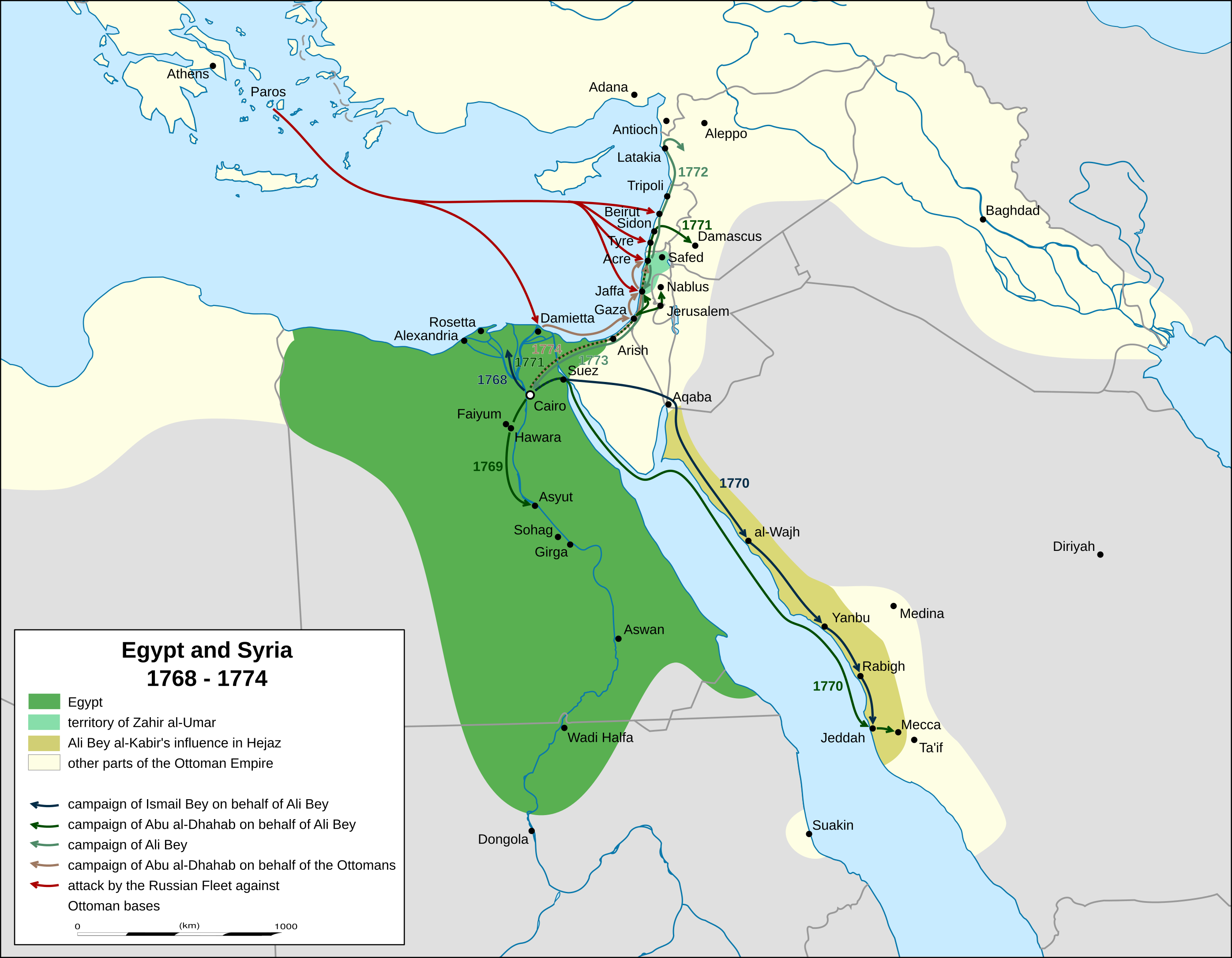
Mamluk Campaigns in Egypt and Syria during the times of Ali Bey and Abu Dhahab (1770–75)

Muhammad Abu al-Dhahab (Arabic: محمد أبو الدهب, romanized: muḥammad abū aḏ-ḏahab; 1735–1775), also just called Abu Dhahab (Arabic: أبو الدهب, romanized: abū ḏahab, lit. 'father of gold', a name apparently given to him on account of his generosity and wealth) was a Mamluk emir and regent of Ottoman Egypt.

== Origin ==
Born in the North Caucasus region of Circassia or in Abkhazia he was kidnapped and sold to the Mamluk Emir Ali Bey al-Kabir in Egypt. He became Ali Bey's closest and favourite fellow, his most trusted general and even his brother-in-law (according to other sources: son-in-law or adoptive son).

== Military career ==
During the Russo-Turkish War Ali Bey declared Egypt's independence from the Ottoman Empire and attempted to restore the former Mamluk Sultanate which was conquered by the Ottoman Turks 250 years before. On behalf of Ali Bey, Abu Dhahab suppressed a revolt in Upper Egypt (1769), seized the Hejaz (1770) and - allied with the Palestinian emir Daher al-Umar - conquered large parts of Ottoman Syria . Having taken Damascus from its Ottoman governor Uthman Pasha al-Kurji

== Siding with the Ottomans ==
Abu Al-Dhahab changed sides, choosing to side with the Ottomans against Ali Bey, he handed over all the conquered territories to the Ottomans and marched against Cairo. Ali Bey fled to Daher al-Umar in Acre, and Abu Dhahab became the new Shaykh al-Balad (civil governor) and de facto ruler of Egypt. When Ali Bey came back and tried to restore his position, he was defeated and killed by Abu Dhahab's forces near Cairo (1773).

== Palestine campaign ==
Acting on Ottoman orders Abu Dhahab invaded Palestine to defeat Sheikh Daher. He conquered Gaza, Jaffa and Acre

== Death ==
During his Palestine campaign Abu Al-Dahab suddenly died of the plague. His comrades Murad Bey and Ibrahim Bey, the leaders of his Mamluk faction (Abu-Dhahab faction or Muhammadiyya), succeeded him in power, with repeated conflicts with Ismail Bey.

== See also ==
- Jazzar Pasha (1720/30s – 1804), associate of Abu al-Dhahab in Cairo
- Mosque of Abu al-Dhahab
