= Shaykh al-balad (Mamluk title) =

Historical administrative and political title in Egypt

Shaykh-al-balad
- شيخ البلد (Arabic)
- Flag of the Beylik of Egypt (1772 - 1786)

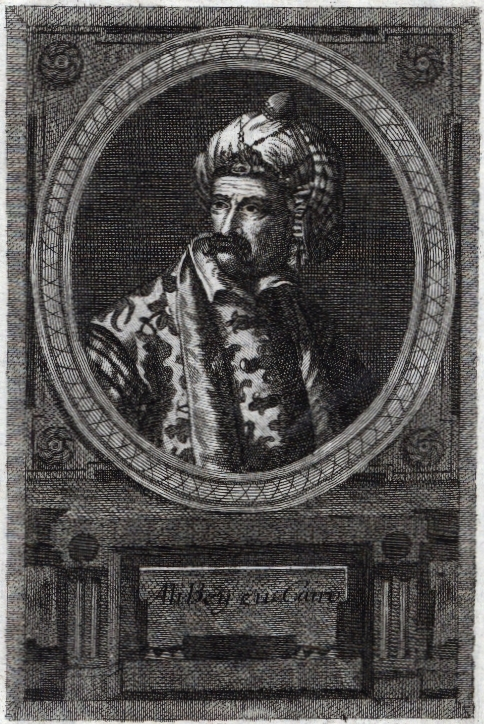
- Ali Bey al-Kabir (October 1767 – April 1772)
- Style: Shaykh; Sultan; Vizier; Kaymakam
- Status: 1748 – 1772 (Highest title in mamluk society); 1772 – 1786 (Head of State of Beylik of Egypt); 1786 – 1800 (Under Ottoman or local influence)
- Residence: Cairo, Ottoman Egypt
- Appointer: Ottoman Sultan, Independent
- Term length: No fixed term
- Inaugural holder: Ibrahim Ketkhuda
- Formation: 1748
- First holder: Ibrahim Ketkhuda and Ridwan Ketkhuda
- Final holder: Ibrahim Bey and Murad Bey
- Abolished: 1800

Shaykh al-Balad (Arabic: شيخ البلد) (Ottoman Turkish: شیخ البلد), (lit. "Chief of the Country" or "Chief of the Town") was a political and administrative title used in Ottoman Egypt. By the eighteenth century, it had become one of the highest positions held by the Mamluk military elite, and its holder often exercised authority that rivaled or surpassed that of the Ottoman governor of Egypt (wali)..

== Etymology ==
The title is derived from the Arabic words shaykh (Arabic: شُيُوخ) ("elder", "chief", or "leader") and al-balad ("the country", "district", or "town"). Historically, the term referred to a prominent local leader, but in Egypt it evolved into a high political office associated with the Mamluk establishment.

== History ==
Following the Ottoman conquest of Egypt in 1517, the province was governed by an Ottoman-appointed governor. However, political influence increasingly rested with competing Mamluk households. By the eighteenth century, the title of Shaykh al-Balad was commonly borne by the most powerful Mamluk leader in Egypt.

The officeholder served as a leading intermediary between the Ottoman administration, military elites, religious authorities, and the general population. During periods of weak Ottoman control, the Shaykh al-Balad frequently became the de facto ruler of Egypt while maintaining nominal loyalty to the Ottoman Empire.

=== History of the term ===
In 1711 a civil war broke between the two dominant mamluk factions of the country, the Faqariya and the Qasimiya, the former backed by the janissaries and the latter by the other Ottoman ojaqs and a newly-emergent mamluk faction, the Qazdughliya. The Faqariya were trounced during the war, but the victorious Qasimiya splintered into a spent force of warring factions by the 1730s, enabling the rise of the Qazdughliya to power. Despite the internal bloodletting among the mamluks, the civil war had signaled the triumph of the mamluk beys over the Ottoman ojaqs as the dominant military power in Egypt. For the remainder of the 18th century, the mamluk beys controlled Egypt's politics, but their incessant factionalism and internal strife allowed the Ottomans to maintain an important influence in provincial affairs. A testament to the newfound power and prestige of the mamluks in Egypt was the inauguration of a new title, shaykh al-balad (chief of the country), bestowed by the sultan on the preeminent mamluk bey. Ibrahim Ketkhuda, had led the Qazdughli faction to victory over the Qasimiya in 1730 and in 1739, drove out the head of the Faqariya, Uthman Bey. By 1748, Ibrahim Ketkhuda and his partner in power, Ridwan Ketkhuda, head of the smaller Julfiyya mamluk faction, stabilized the country under their joint leadership.

Ibrahim Ketkhuda died in November 1754, after which he was succeeded as head of the Qazdughli faction by Abd al-Rahman Ketkhuda, while Ridwan succeeded him as shaykh al-balad. Ridwan was ousted in May 1755, and by October, Uthman Bey al-Jirjawi became shaykh al-balad and Abd al-Rahman largely retired from politics.

Jirjawi was ousted by Husayn Bey al-Sabunji, who became shaykh al-balad and exiled his potential rivals. In November, Sabunji was overthrown in a plot led by Husayn Bey Kashkash, a prominent bey of Ibrahim Ketkhuda's household. Ali Bey al-Ghazzawi, who had also been a mamluk of Ibrahim Ketkhuda, was recalled from his exile and was chosen in the council of preeminent beys as the new shaykh al-balad. While Ghazzawi was leading the Hajj caravan in 1760, he attempted to assassinate Abd al-Rahman, who remained influential in his retirement. The plot was detected, after which Abd al-Rahman allied with Ali Bey, who wielded significant influence with the janissaries, to strengthen his position against Ghazzawi. In a council of the leading beys held in Ghazzawi's absence, Abd al-Rahman proposed that Ali Bey replace the acting shaykh al-balad, Khalil Bey al-Daftardar, to which the council agreed. Upon hearing the election of Ali Bey and a subsequent order to execute the conspirators who attempted to assassinate Abd al-Rahman, Ghazzawi took up exile in Gaza on his way back from the Hajj.

Although Ali Bey was officially shaykh al-balad, Abd al-Rahman, who lived in relative seclusion from daily politics, wielded actual power. The limitation of his power by Abd al-Rahman, as well as by the Ottoman governor and the other mamluk beys, did not reconcile with Ali Bey's ambitions for total power. He resolved to eliminate his rivals, promote mamluks of his own household and engineer their appointments to powerful positions, and expand his sources of income. He began his thrust for power in 1763, when he exiled several officers of the janissaries from Alexandria and arrested for ransom four priests in Alexandria. In 1765 he exiled Abd al-Rahman to the Hejaz. In the meantime he was rapidly acquiring and promoting his mamluks, such that he had 3,000 mamluks and made eight of them beys by 1766.

Ali Bey's intensifying moves against the ojaqs and fellow mamluk emirs and the empowerment of his own mamluks and tyrannical rule all brought about a check on his power by the Ottoman imperial government. It appointed a new governor, Hamza Pasha, with secret instructions to bring down Ali Bey. The governor invited Ali Bey's main mamluk rival, Husayn Bey Kashkash, back to Egypt from exile. In the subsequent years, Ali bey was forced to step down as shaykh al-balad.

The tyrannical rule of Khalil Bey and Husayn Bey led to Hamza Pasha facilitating Ali Bey's return to Egypt to use him as a check on the ruling beys' power. On 6 September 1766, Ali Bey and his top mamluks appeared at the Cairo houses of the leading beys and demanded their restoration to the mamluk decision-making council. He also allied with the Hawwara tribe, which was already hosting several mamluk exiles from the Qasimiya faction under Salih Bey. In February 1767, illicit communications between Ali Bey and his sympathizers in Cairo were detected, leading to the killings or exile of the sympathizers by the ruling beys and an order to exile Ali Bey to Jeddah. Around the same time, however, Hamza Pasha moved against the mamluks, per orders from Constantinople. Although several beys were slain and Husayn Bey was wounded, the mamluks prevailed against the governor, whom they deposed.

The imperial government soon after sent a new governor, Rakım Mehmed Pasha, with orders to rein in the beys and prop up Ali Bey. Ali rebelled against Husayn Bey and Khalil Bey by blocking traffic along the Nile River, preventing food supplies to Cairo from Upper Egypt, and stopping tax payments from the Upper Egyptian districts. After abortive expeditions from the ruling mamluks against Ali Bey and Salih Bey, the latter two launched their offensive, appearing before Cairo in autumn 1767. Without any actual fighting, Ali Bey and Salih Bey entered Cairo in October, while Khalil Bey and Husayn Bey left for Gaza. Rakım Mehmed Pasha recognized Ali Bey as shaykh al-balad and restored his subordinate beys to their former offices.

In May, Husayn Bey and Khalil Bey launched a campaign against Ali Bey from Gaza, sweeping through the Nile Delta, before establishing base in Tanta. Ali Bey obtained a firman from Rakım Mehmed Pasha officially declaring them rebels, enabling him to use imperial funds against them. Muhammad Bey Abu al-Dhahab and Salih Bey, confronted the rebels, who surrendered after running out of ammunition. Husayn Bey was beheaded, while Khalil Bey took refuge in the Ahmad Al-Badawi Mosque until Ali Bey permitted him to enter exile in Alexandria. There, in July 1768, he was strangled. By September, Ali Bey had Salih Bey assassinated, and soon after broke up his household, exiling his mamluks to Tanta, Damietta, Jeddah, and Upper Egypt.

Gradually, he assumed the office of qa'immiqam, thereby attaining the executive powers of the governor during his absence.Rakım Mehmed Pasha attempted to depose Ali Bey in November by enlisting Abu al-Dhahab. The latter revealed the plot to Ali Bey, who then denounced and ousted the governor.

== Title Holders ==
No.	Name	Reign	Notes
1	Ibrahim Ketkhuda Ridwan Ketkhuda	1748 – November 1754	Leaders of the Qazdughliya and the Julfiyya mamluk factions.; Stabilized the mamluk society through joint leadership.
2	Ridwan Ketkhuda	November 1754 – May 1755	Became sole shaykh-al-balad after Ibrahim's death.; Ousted and succeeded by Uthman Bey al-Jirjawi.
3	Uthman Bey al-Jirjawi	May 1755 – ?	Ousted Ridwan as shaykh-al-balad.; Ousted by Husayn Bey al-Sabunji.
4	Husayn Bey al-Sabunji	? – ?	Ousted in a plot led by Husayn Bey Kashkash.; Overthrown and succeeded by Ali Bey al-Ghazzawi in a council of preeminent mamluks.
5	Ali Bey al-Ghazzawi	? – 1760	Succeeded Husayn Bey al-Sabunji.; Left Khalil Bey as acting shaykh-al-balad, when he became amir al-hajj in 1760.; Failed to assassinate Abd al-Rahman Ketkhuda.; Exiled after the council stripped him off his title.
6	Khalil Bey al-Daftardar (acting)	1760 – 1760	Forced to compile with the council, accepted Ali Bey al Kabir as shaykh-al-balad.
7	Ali Bey al-Kabir	1760 – March 1766	Eliminated his rivals and promoted mamluks of his own household.; Exiled officers of the janissaries from Alexandria and Abd al-Rahman to the Hejaz.; Failed to poison Hamza Pasha, forced to abdicate his position.; Exiled to Medina, took refuge in Gaza.
8	Husayn Bey Kashkash Khalil Bey al-Daftardar	March 1766 – October 1767	Assumed the title after Ali Bey abdicated.; Deposed Hamza Pasha, limited Ali Bey's influence, and imposed a tyrannical regime.; Deposed by Ali Bey and Salih Bey, with support of Rakım Mehmed Pasha.
(7)	Ali Bey al-Kabir	October 1767 – 28 April 1772	Assumed power with support of Rakım Mehmed Pasha.; Executed rivals Husayn Bey, Khalil Bey, Ali Bey Jinn and Hasan Bey, and ally Salih Bey to promote his mamluks.; Appointed Ismail Bey as defterdar, Ayyub Bey as governor of Girga, and Hasan Bey Ridwan as amir al-hajj.; Deposed Rakım Mehmed Pasha, assumed the title of qa'immiqam.; Rebelled against Ottomans, established the Beylik of Egypt.; Launched campaigns in Syria, Hejaz and Egypt.; Deposed by ally Abu al-Dhahab, took refuge with Daher al-Umar.
9	Abu al-Dhahab	28 April 1772 – 10 June 1775	Deposed Ali Bey in Cairo.; Launched a campaign in Palestine.; Defeated and imprisoned Ali Bey.; Died due to illness.
10	Ibrahim Bey Murad Bey	10 June 1775 – 1777	Succeeded Abu al-Dhahab as shaykh-al-balad.; Attempted to poison Ismail Bey.; Ousted and succeeded by Ismail Bey to Upper Egypt.
11	Ismail Bey	1777 - 1778	Deposed after his mamluks changed sides.
(10)	Ibrahim Bey Murad Bey	1778 – 1786	Ousted Ismail Bey.; Deposed by Cezayirli Gazi Hasan Pasha.
(11)	Ismail Bey	1786 – 1791	Assumed the title with support of Cezayirli Gazi Hasan Pasha and Ismail Pasha.; Died due to a local plague, succeeded by Ibrahim Bey and Murad Bey.
(10)	Ibrahim Bey Murad Bey	1792 – 1798	Succeeded Ismail Bey.; Fought against the French during the French invasion of Egypt and Syria.; Lost prominence with rise of Muhammad Ali of Egypt.
–	Ibrahim Bey (claimant)	1798 – 1800	Title left unclaimed after his death.

== Functions ==
The responsibilities of the Shaykh al-Balad varied over time and according to political circumstances. They generally included:

- Leadership of major Mamluk factions.
- Representation of local interests before the Ottoman authorities.
- Oversight of public order and taxation.
- Mediation between administrative officials and the population.
- Coordination with religious and judicial authorities.

The practical authority of the office depended largely on the military and political strength of its holder.

== Decline ==
The office lost much of its importance following the rise of Muhammad Ali Pasha in the early nineteenth century. His administrative and military reforms centralized power and curtailed the influence of the Mamluk elite, ending the political prominence of the Shaykh al-Balad.

== See also ==
- Ottoman Egypt
- Mamluks
- Bey
- Wali
- Muhammad Ali of Egypt
