= Melek Mehmed Pasha =

Ottoman grand vizier

Damat Melek Mehmed Pasha (1719–1802, Istanbul) was an Ottoman Bosnian Kapudan Pasha who served as grand vizier between 1792 and 1794, during the reign of Selim III.
