= Ismail Bey =

Mamluk emir and regent of Ottoman Egypt

Ismail Bey al-Kabir

Defterdar of Ottoman Egypt
- In office September 1768 – 1775
- Monarchs: Ali Bey al-Kabir; Abu al-Dhahab

Shaykh al-Balad of Egypt (Chief of the Country) (Note: Shaykh al-Balad was the office of the highest ranking mamluk bey in 18th-century Ottoman Egypt, in effect the strongman of the province, more powerful than the Ottoman governor. The title was bestowed on its holder by the Ottoman sultan.)
- In office 1777–1778
- Governor: Izzet Mehmed Pasha
- Preceded by: Ibrahim Bey and Murad Bey
- Succeeded by: Ibrahim Bey and Murad Bey
- In office 1786–1791
- Monarchs: Abdul Hamid I Selim III
- Governor: Keki Abdi Pasha; Ismail Pasha (Tripolitanian)
- Preceded by: Ibrahim Bey and Murad Bey
- Succeeded by: Ibrahim Bey and Murad Bey

Personal details
- Born: c. 1735? Circassia
- Died: January/ March 1791 Cairo, Ottoman Empire
- Military career
- Conflicts: Wars of the Beylik of Egypt

Ismāʿīl Bey (c. 1735? - March 1791), also known as Ismail Bey al-Kabir ("the Great") was a Mamluk emir and regent of Ottoman Egypt.

== Biography ==
Ismail was of Georgian origin, and became a Mamluk of the Emir Ali Bey al-Kabir in Egypt. During the Russo-Turkish War Ali Bey used the opportunity to declare Egypt's independence from the Ottoman Empire. On Ali's behalf Ismail Bey suppressed a pro-Ottoman revolt in Lower Egypt (1768). Acting on Ali's orders he also invaded Hijaz and subdued all of its ports and coastal towns north of Jeddah (1770). When Ali Bey's most trusted general (and brother-in-law) Muhammad Bey Abu al-Dhahab betrayed him and marched against Cairo, Ismail Bey was sent out to intercept him but was forced to surrender and to submit (1772).

After Abu Dhahab's death (1775) Ismail Bey rallied the remaining mamluks of Ali Bey but failed to prevent Abu Dhahabs comrades Ibrahim Bey and Murad Bey from succeeding him. Murad tried to poison him, however, Ismail and the Ali-Bey-faction (Alawiyya) managed to expel the Abu-Dhahab-faction (Muhammadiyya) from Cairo to Upper Egypt (1777). A few months later several Alawiyya-emirs changed sides. Ibrahim and Murad came back and forced Ismail to flee (1778).

Following the intervention of the Ottoman admiral Hasan Pasha in 1786 Ismail Bey returned to Egypt and was installed as Shaykh al-Balad (civil governor and de facto ruler) while Ibrahim and Murad escaped to Upper Egypt again. Due to another Russo-Turkish War the Ottoman Empire withdrew the Ottoman troops the next year. Ismail Bey asked the French consul whether France could send military instructors and training units. However, the French Revolution made this impossible. Ismail Bey and almost the whole of his faction was wiped out because of the plague. After the Ismailiyya-regime collapsed, Ibrahim and Murad returned and took over the power again. Murad decided to reside in Ismail's palace.

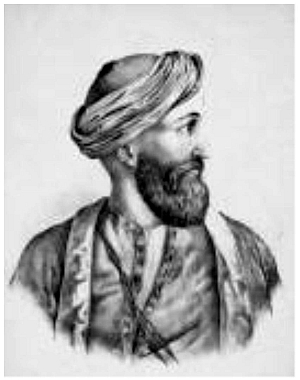
Mentor: Ali Bey

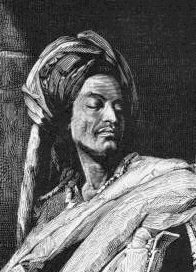
Rival: Abu Dhahab

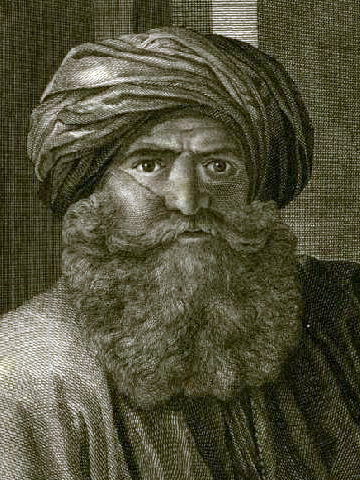
Enemy: Murad Bey

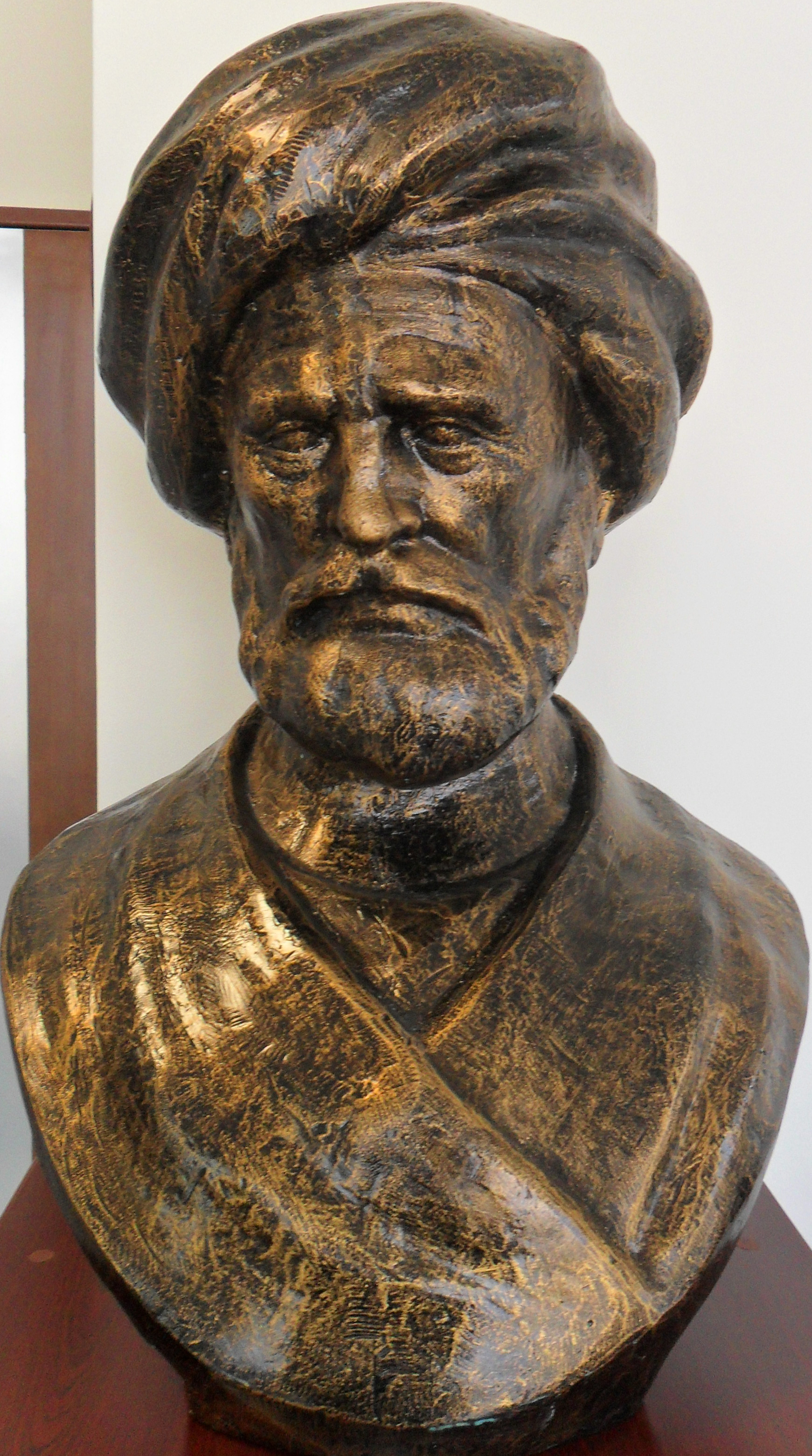
Ally: Hasan Pasha

== Literature ==
- ʿAbdarraḥmān al-Ǧabartī, Arnold Hottinger (translator): Bonaparte in Ägypten - Aus den Chroniken von ʿAbdarraḥmān al-Ǧabartī, pages 58–71. Piper, Munich 1989
- Robin Leonard Bidwell: Dictionary of Modern Arab History, pages 205 und 286f. London/New York 1998
- M. W. Daly, Carl F. Petry: The Cambridge History of Egypt, Volume 2, pages 79–85. Cambridge 1998
