= Ali Bey al-Kabir =

Mamluk leader in Egypt

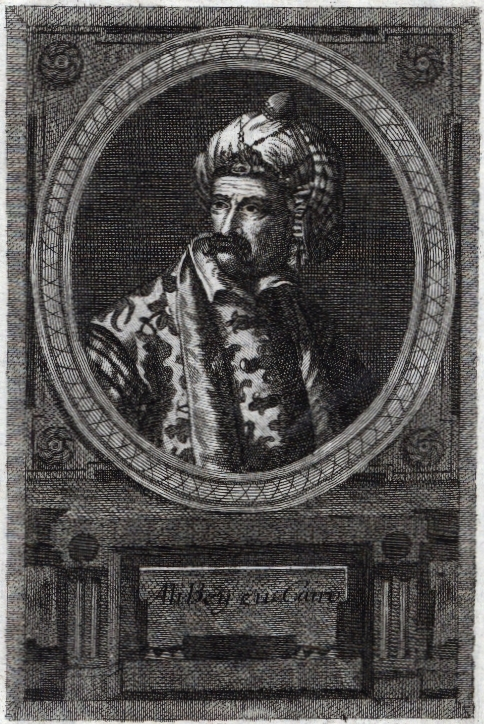
- Ali Bey al-Kabir (1728–1773)

Amir al-hajj (Commander of the Hajj Caravan)
- In office 1753/54–1753/54
- Appointed by: Ibrahim Ketkhuda; Ridwan Ketkhuda
- Monarch: Mahmud I
- Governor: Divitdar Mehmed Emin Pasha; Baltacızade Mustafa Pasha

Shaykh al-Balad of Egypt (Chief of the Country) (Note: Shaykh al-Balad was the office of the highest ranking mamluk bey in 18th-century Ottoman Egypt, in effect the strongman of the province, more powerful than the Ottoman governor. The title was bestowed on its holder by the Ottoman sultan.) Sultan of Egypt
- In office 1760 – March 1766
- Monarch: Mustafa III
- Governor: Köse Bahir Mustafa Pasha; Kamil Ahmed Pasha; Abu Bakr Rasim Pasha; Muhammad Pasha al-Akhsal'i; Hacı Ahmed Pasha; Macar Hacı Hasan Pasha; Silahdar Mahir Hamza Pasha
- Preceded by: Ali Bey al-Ghazzawi
- Succeeded by: Husayn Bey Kashkash; Khalil Bey al-Daftardar
- In office October 1767 – 28 April 1772
- Monarchs: Mustafa III (1767-1769); Himself (1769-1772)
- Governor: Rakım Mehmed Pasha; Köprülü Hafız Ahmed Pasha; Kelleci Osman Pasha; Uthman Pasha al-Wakil
- Succeeded by: Abu al-Dhahab

Personal details
- Born: 1728 Principality of Abkhazia or Alexandria, Egypt
- Died: 8 May 1773 (aged 44–45) Cairo, Ottoman Empire
- Resting place: Qarafa al-Sughra
- Nickname(s): Jinn Ali, Bulut Kapan
- Military career
- Conflicts: Wars of Ali Bey

Ali Bey al-Kabir (Arabic: علي بك الكبير, romanized: ʿAlī Bey al-Kābīr, Georgian: ალი ბეი ალ-ქაბირი; 1728 – 8 May 1773) was a mamluk who served as shaykh al-balad (chief of the country) of Ottoman Egypt in 1760–1766 and 1767–1772. He was effectively the strongman of Egypt and in 1769 practically pursued independence from the Ottomans, minting coins in his own name, terminating the annual tribute to Istanbul and launching conquests of the Hejaz and Syria in 1770–1771. His rule ended following the insubordination of his most trusted general, Abu al-Dahab, which led to Ali Bey's downfall and death.

== Origins ==
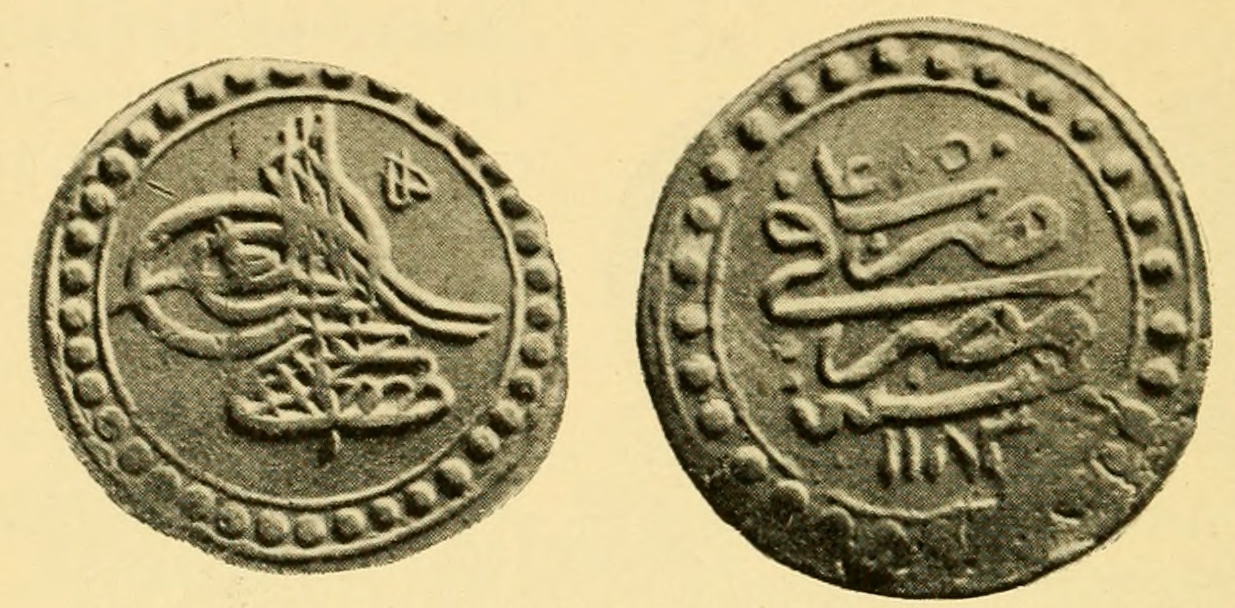
Yigirmishlik (Ottoman silver coin) of Ali Bey, Egypt, 1769

Ali Bey was born in the Principality of Abkhazia. According to Pleshcheev and Fındıklılı Efendi, Ali Bey was of ethnic Abkhazian origin. The Encyclopedia of Islam adds that according to Ali Bey's contemporary biographer, Sauveur Lusignan, he was "supposedly" the son of a certain David, a Greek Orthodox priest. Lusignan notes that his name is Daut, which is the Abkhaz version of the name David. Another version is that he was of ethnic Georgian origin. According to Alexander Mikaberidze, Ali Bey's father was a priest in the Georgian Orthodox Church. (Note: In his 2015 work (Historical Dictionary of Georgia), Mikaberidze mentions that Ali Bey was born into a family of orthodox Christians, without mentioning the specific Church.) He was kidnapped and brought to Cairo, the capital of Ottoman Egypt, in 1741, when he was around 13, and was sold into slavery. He was purchased by two Jewish customs agents who gave him to Ibrahim Ketkhuda in 1743. Ibrahim Ketkhuda was also of Georgian origin.

== Early career ==
Although the Mamluk Sultanate of Egypt and Syria was conquered by the Ottoman Empire in 1516–1517, the new rulers incorporated the remnant mamluk (manumitted slave soldier) troops and officials into the governance systems of the newly-formed province of Egypt. The Ottoman sultan, wary of concentrating the full extent of Egypt's large military and economic resources into the hands of its governor, set up a complex system of government in the province to balance his power. While the governor, always chosen from the Ottoman imperial personnel, remained the sultan's chief executive in Egypt and held the high rank of pasha, the defterdar, or treasurer, who was typically a mamluk, was given extensive power over the economy, and held the next highest rank of sanjakbey, often abbreviated to 'bey'. The province had seven Ottoman army units, called ojaqs, the most powerful of which was the janissaries. The remnant mamluks maintained a parallel military structure in the province that was initially loyal to the Ottoman rulers, who allowed them to continue importing and training new recruits, critical to the continuation of the mamluk tradition. By the early 18th century, the ojaqs had become considerably weakened and dominated by the mamluk beys. The powerful offices of the defterdar, the qa'imiqam, who wielded executive authority during the absence of the governor, the amir al-hajj, who commanded the annual Muslim pilgrim caravan to Mecca, and the chief of the janissaries, were all held by mamluk beys.

In 1711 a civil war broke between the two dominant mamluk factions of the country, the Faqariya and the Qasimiya, the former backed by the janissaries and the latter by the other Ottoman ojaqs and a newly-emergent mamluk faction, the Qazdughliya. The Faqariya were trounced during the war, but the victorious Qasimiya splintered into a spent force of warring factions by the 1730s, enabling the rise of the Qazdughliya to power. Despite the internal bloodletting among the mamluks, the civil war had signaled the triumph of the mamluk beys over the Ottoman ojaqs as the dominant military power in Egypt. For the remainder of the 18th century, the mamluk beys controlled Egypt's politics, but their incessant factionalism and internal strife allowed the Ottomans to maintain an important influence in provincial affairs. A testament to the newfound power and prestige of the mamluks in Egypt was the inauguration of a new title, shaykh al-balad (chief of the country), bestowed by the sultan on the preeminent mamluk bey.

Ali's master, Ibrahim Ketkhuda, had led the Qazdughli faction to victory over the Qasimiya in 1730 and in 1739, drove out the head of the Faqariya, Uthman Bey. By 1748, Ibrahim Ketkhuda and his partner in power, Ridwan Ketkhuda, head of the smaller Julfiyya mamluk faction, stabilized the country under their joint leadership. Moving up the ranks in Ibrahim Ketkhuda's mamluk household, Ali reached the rank of kashif in 1749. Kashifs were a rank below the beys, whom they expected to succeed in time, and were chosen among the favorite mamluks of their patron. In the early 18th century, there were thirty-six administrative offices open to kashifs, who numbered between sixty and seventy at that time. Their jurisdiction typically included a group of villages in a rural province and they were essentially the most powerful administrators in those parts of the countryside that were not controlled by the Bedouin (nomadic) tribes.

In 1753 or 1754, Ali was the amir al-hajj, the second most important office in the mamluk beylicate of the 18th century. In the course of leading the caravan, he made daring attacks against the Bedouin tribes who dwelt in the desert regions through which the caravan route passed. He earned his popular Turkish nickname, Balut Kapan, meaning 'he who catches clouds', an allusion to the Bedouin, who were as elusive as clouds. His less common, Arabic nickname, Jinn Ali ('Ali the demon'), was similarly a reference to his ferocity against the Bedouin. Upon his return from the Hajj, Ali attained the rank of bey. Ibrahim Ketkhuda died in November 1754, after which he was succeeded as head of the Qazdughli faction by Abd al-Rahman Ketkhuda, while Ridwan succeeded him as shaykh al-balad. Ridwan was ousted in May 1755, and by October, Uthman Bey al-Jirjawi became shaykh al-balad and Abd al-Rahman largely retired from politics. Ali became a bey during al-Jirjawi's reign.

Jirjawi was ousted by Husayn Bey al-Sabunji, who became shaykh al-balad and exiled Ali Bey to the village of Nusat in Lower Egypt as part of a purge of potential rivals. In November, Sabunji was overthrown in a plot led by Husayn Bey Kashkash, a prominent bey of Ibrahim Ketkhuda's household, who recalled Ali Bey from his exile. Another 'Ali Bey', known as 'al-Ghazzawi', who had also been a mamluk of Ibrahim Ketkhuda, was recalled from his exile as well and was chosen in the council of preeminent beys as the new shaykh al-balad. While Ghazzawi was leading the Hajj caravan in 1760, he attempted to assassinate Abd al-Rahman, who remained influential in his retirement. The plot was detected, after which Abd al-Rahman allied with Ali Bey, who wielded significant influence with the janissaries, to strengthen his position against Ghazzawi. In a council of the leading beys held in Ghazzawi's absence, Abd al-Rahman proposed that Ali Bey replace the acting shaykh al-balad, Khalil Bey al-Daftardar, to which the council agreed. Upon hearing the election of Ali Bey and a subsequent order to execute the conspirators who attempted to assassinate Abd al-Rahman, Ghazzawi took up exile in Gaza on his way back from the Hajj.

== Chief of Egypt ==
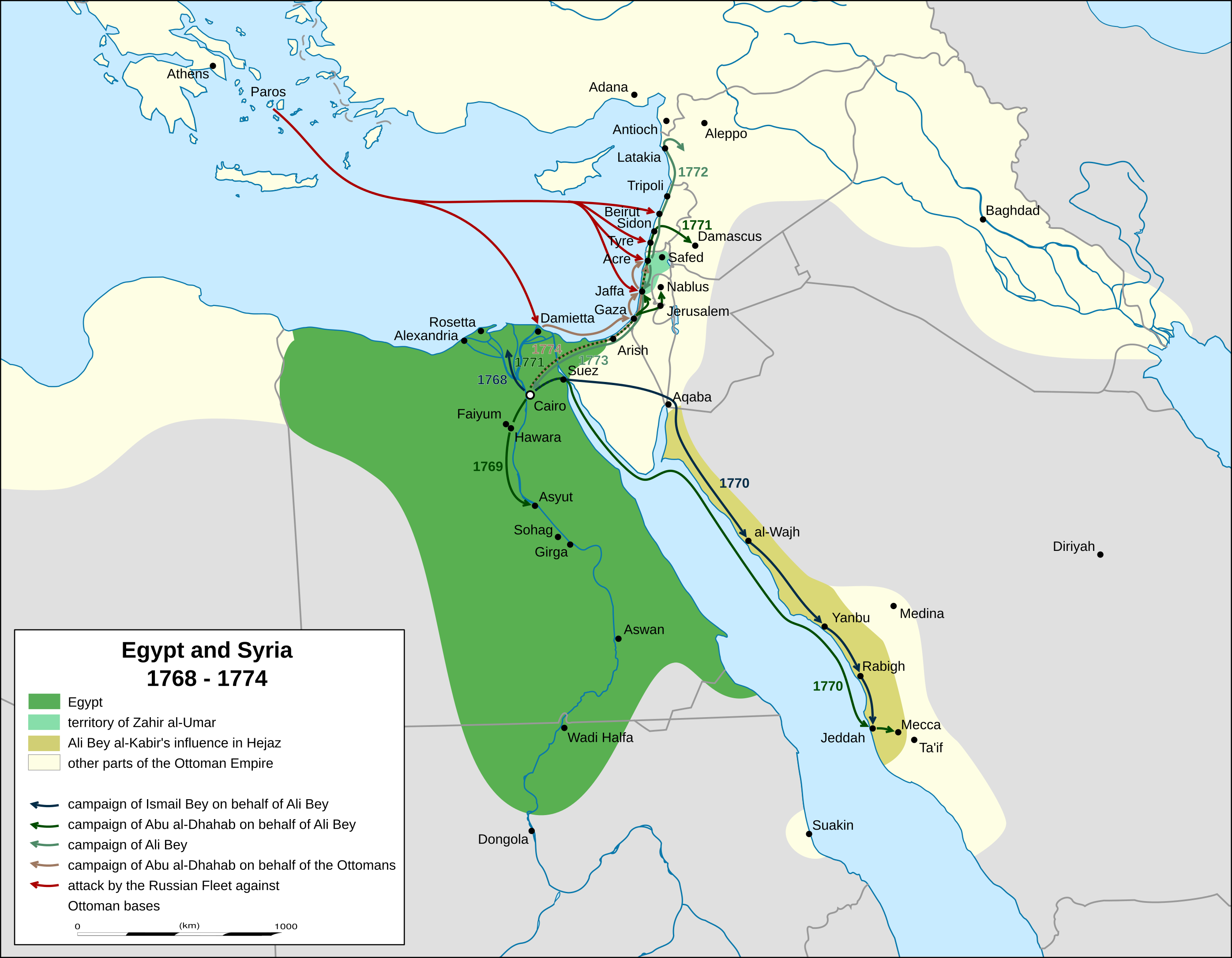
Mamluk Campaigns in Egypt and Syria during the times of Ali Bey and Abu Dhahab (1770–75)

=== First term ===
Although Ali Bey was officially shaykh al-balad, Abd al-Rahman, who lived in relative seclusion from daily politics, wielded actual power. Abd al-Rahman was neither a bey nor a mamluk, but a son of a mamluk, who were not favored in the mamluk system for advancement, and used Ali Bey as his political puppet. The limitation of his power by Abd al-Rahman, as well as by the Ottoman governor and the other mamluk beys, did not reconcile with Ali Bey's ambitions for total power. He resolved to eliminate his rivals, promote mamluks of his own household and engineer their appointments to powerful positions, and expand his sources of income. He began his thrust for power in 1763, when he exiled several officers of the janissaries from Alexandria and arrested for ransom four priests in Alexandria. The following year, he may have engineered the poisoning death of Egypt's incoming governor before he could assume office. In 1765 he exiled Abd al-Rahman to the Hejaz (western Arabia). In the meantime he was rapidly acquiring and promoting his mamluks, such that he had 3,000 mamluks and made eight of them beys by 1766.

=== Exile in Gaza ===
Ali Bey's intensifying moves against the ojaqs and fellow mamluk emirs and the empowerment of his own mamluks and tyrannical rule all brought about a check on his power by the Ottoman imperial government. It appointed a new governor, Hamza Pasha, with secret instructions to bring down Ali Bey. The governor invited Ali Bey's main mamluk rival, Husayn Bey Kashkash, back to Egypt from exile. Ali Bey made an abortive attempt to kill Husayn Bey by poisoning, but the plot was detected and prompted Husayn Bey and Hamza Pasha to retaliate by besieging Ali Bey in his palace. He was forced to step down as shaykh al-balad. Although he agreed to exile in Medina, he took refuge in Gaza, on Egypt's border. In Gaza, Ali Bey established contact with the Acre-based strongman of northern Palestine, Daher al-Umar, and gained the latter's support.

=== Second term ===
==== Return to power ====
The tyrannical rule of Khalil Bey and Husayn Bey led to Hamza Pasha facilitating Ali Bey's return to Egypt to use him as a check on the ruling beys' power. On 6 September 1766, Ali Bey and his top mamluks appeared at the Cairo houses of the leading beys and demanded their restoration to the mamluk decision-making council. The council's members did not readmit them, but allowed them to stay in Egypt, with Ali Bey banished to Nusat, where he was to live off its revenues, and the others in his party sent to Upper Egypt, where the powerful Hawwara tribe was already hosting several mamluk exiles from the Qasimiya faction under Salih Bey. In February 1767, illicit communications between Ali Bey and his sympathizers in Cairo were detected, leading to the killings or exile of the sympathizers by the ruling beys and an order to exile Ali Bey to Jeddah. Around the same time, however, Hamza Pasha moved against the mamluks, per orders from Constantinople. Although several beys were slain and Husayn Bey was wounded, the mamluks prevailed against the governor, whom they deposed.

The imperial government soon after sent a new governor, Rakım Mehmed Pasha, with orders to rein in the beys and prop up Ali Bey. Despite the threat he posed to them, Ali Bey was allowed by his mamluk rivals in power to join his mamluks in exile at Asyut in Upper Egypt. There, the leader of the Hawwara, Sheikh Humam, brokered an alliance between Ali Bey and Salih Bey. The two now rebelled against Husayn Bey and Khalil Bey by blocking traffic along the Nile River, preventing food supplies to Cairo from Upper Egypt, and stopping tax payments from the Upper Egyptian districts. After abortive expeditions from the ruling mamluks against Ali Bey and Salih Bey, the latter two launched their offensive, appearing before Cairo in autumn 1767. Rakım Mehmed Pasha, intent on toppling the beys, ordered the ojaqs back to their barracks, thus depriving Husayn Bey and Khalil Bey of crucial military support. Without any actual fighting, Ali Bey and Salih Bey entered Cairo in October, while Khalil Bey and Husayn Bey left for Gaza. Rakım Mehmed Pasha recognized Ali Bey as shaykh al-balad and restored his subordinate beys to their former offices.

==== Elimination of rivals and advancement of allies ====
Soon after, Ali Bey launched a campaign to eliminate his rivals. On 30 November 1767 he assassinated two top-ranking mamluks, Ali Bey Jinn and Hasan Bey, and followed it up by expelling from Egypt four other beys and their retinues. On 1 March 1768, he exiled some thirty officers, including eighteen high-ranking mamluks of his ally Salih Bey's household. In May, Husayn Bey and Khalil Bey launched a campaign against Ali Bey from Gaza, sweeping through the Nile Delta, before establishing base in Tanta. Ali Bey obtained a firman from Rakım Mehmed Pasha officially declaring them rebels, enabling him to use imperial funds against them, though he still imposed heavy exactions on the local and foreign merchants toward the same purpose. Muhammad Bey Abu al-Dhahab and Salih Bey, confronted the rebels, who surrendered after running out of ammunition. Husayn Bey was beheaded, while Khalil Bey took refuge in the Ahmad Al-Badawi Mosque until Ali Bey permitted him to enter exile in Alexandria. There, in July 1768, he was strangled. For the remainder of the year, Ali Bey continued eliminating or substantially weakening rivals among the mamluks and in the ranks of the ojaqs, especially the janissaries, who remained the only influential government military force in the province. By September, the French consul reported "never has the Janissary ojaq been reduced to the point it is today". That month, Ali Bey had Salih Bey assassinated, and soon after broke up his household, exiling his mamluks to Tanta, Damietta, Jeddah, and Upper Egypt.

With every move against his rivals, Ali Bey consolidated his hold over the military and bureaucracy in Egypt. All of the officers he eliminated were replaced by his own mamluks. He allowed the beys from his household to build up households of their own, while he acquired substantial numbers of new mamluks and commissioned mercenaries to supplement his forces. After Salih Bey's assassination, Ali Bey promoted three more of his mamluks as beys, appointed Ismail Bey as defterdar, Ayyub Bey as governor of the major district of Girga, and another of his mamluk beys, Hasan Bey Ridwan, as amir al-hajj and amir Misr (commander of Cairo). In September, he had assumed the office of qa'immiqam, thereby attaining the executive powers of the governor during his absence. Crecelius notes by "combining the leadership of the mamluk regime with the executive functions of the Ottoman government Ali Bey had gained complete mastery of the Ottoman administration and reduced the governor to impotence". Rakım Mehmed Pasha attempted to depose Ali Bey in November by enlisting Muhammad Bey Abu al-Dhahab. The latter revealed the plot to Ali Bey, who then denounced and ousted the governor.

==== Revolt against Ottomans ====
Ali Bey stopped the annual tribute to the Sublime Porte and in an unprecedented usurpation of the Ottoman Sultan's privileges had his name struck on local coins in 1769 (alongside the sultan's emblem), effectively declaring Egypt's independence from Ottoman rule. In 1770 he gained control of the Hejaz and a year later temporarily occupied Syria, thereby reconstituting the Mamluk state that had disappeared in 1517. However, a few days after a major victory over the governor of Damascus, Uthman Pasha al-Kurji, by the allied forces of Daher al-Umar and Ali Bey's forces on 6 June 1771, Abu al-Dhahab, the commander of his troops in Syria, refused to continue the fight after an Ottoman agent stirred up mistrust between him and Ali Bey, and hastily returned to Egypt. As a result, Ali Bey lost power in 1772. The following year, he was killed in Cairo.

However, the date of 1772 is highly disputed; other sources and historians give varying dates for the end of Ali Bey's power in Egypt. Uzunçarşılı claims that he held power until 1773 (when Kara Halil Pasha became governor), but Sicill-i Osmani disagrees, saying that he fell out of power in 1769 and naming three interceding governors by name between the end of Ali Bey's reign in 1769 and Kara Halil Pasha's appointment in 1773; these are Köprülü Hafız Ahmed Pasha (1769), Kelleci Osman Pasha (1769–1771), and Vekil Osman Pasha (1772–1773). First-person source Al-Jabarti declares that Ali Bey gave up power in 1769 when a new governor from the Ottoman capital of Istanbul was assigned by the sultan (although he doesn't name him). It is likely that Uzunçarşılı read Al-Jabarti's chronicle, but failed to note the narrative about the new governor coming from Istanbul in 1769, since after that, Al-Jabarti does not name any other pasha by name or sequence until 1773 with Kara Halil Pasha.

=== Economic policies ===
According to historians Cleveland and Bunton, "During his time in power, he successfully expanded Egypt's trade with Britain and France. He also hired European advisers to the military and bought European weapons". However, according to Bidwell, "... he did not make use of native Egyptians or call in foreigners for technical advice. He made no effort to build a modern army ..."

== In fiction ==
The rise and fall of Ali Bey (spelt Aly in the novel) is described in Vol1 Ch. 16 of the 1819 novel Anastasius by Thomas Hope. Hope describes how Aly renounces his allegiance with the Ottomans and sides with the Russians. He rewards his 'adoptive sons' (i.e. Mamluk followers) Ismail Bey and Hasan Bey with positions in Damascus and Djedda while keeping his favourite Mohammed at home with fatal consequences. Aly fetches his own sister to marry Mohammed, and showers him with riches such that he becomes known as Abu al-Dhahab, or 'Father of Gold', only for his 'adoptive son' to reward him by killing him. The end of Vol1 and beginning of Vol 2 of the novel is set amid the civil war and chaos that follows this act of treachery.

== See also ==
- List of Ottoman governors of Egypt
- Nafisa al-Bayda

== Sources ==
- Crecelius, Daniel (1981). A Study of the Regimes of 'Ali Bey al-Kabir and Muhammad Bey Abu al-Dhahab, 1760-1775. Minneapolis and Chicago: Bibliotheca Islamica. ISBN 0-88297-029-1.
- Crecelius, Daniel (1998). "Egypt in the Eighteenth Century". In Daly, M. W. (ed.). The Cambridge History of Egypt, Volume 2: Modern Egypt, from 1517 to the End of the Twentieth Century. Cambridge: Cambridge University Press. pp. 59–86. ISBN 0-521-47211-3.
- Crecelius, Daniel (2007). "ʿAlī Bey al- Kabīr". Encyclopaedia of Islam 3. doi:10.1163/1573-3912_ei3_SIM_0207.
- Crecelius, Daniel; Djaparidze, Gotcha (2008). "Georgians in the Military Establishment in Egypt in the Seventeenth and Eighteenth Centuries". Annales Islamologiques. 42: 313–337.
- Hathaway, Jane; Barbir, Karl (2013). The Arab Lands under Ottoman Rule: 1516-1800. Routledge.
- Joudah, Ahmad Hasan (2013). Revolt in Palestine in the eighteenth century : the era of Shaykh Zahir al-Umar. Gorgias Press. ISBN 978-1-4632-0002-2.
- Livingstone, John W. (1970). "The Rise of Shaykh al-Balad 'Alī Bey al-Kabīr: A Study in the Accuracy of the Chronicle of al-Jabartī". Bulletin of the School of Oriental and African Studies. 33 (2): 283–294. doi:10.1017/S0041977X00103350. JSTOR 613005. S2CID 162015057.
- Mikaberidze, Alexander (2011). "Ali Bey al-Kabir". In Mikaberidze, Alexander (ed.). Conflict and Conquest in the Islamic World: A Historical Encyclopedia. Vol. I. ABC-CLIO.
- Mikaberidze, Alexander (2015). Historical Dictionary of Georgia (2 ed.). Rowman & Littlefield. ISBN 978-1442241466.
- Winter, Michael (2005) [1992]. Egyptian Society Under Ottoman Rule, 1517-1798. London and New York: Taylor and Francis. ISBN 0-415-02403-X.

== Literature ==
- Sauveur Lusignan: A history of the Revolution of Ali Bey against the Ottoman Porte. London 1783
