= Abdul-Karim Rafeq =

Abdul-Karim Rafeq (1931–2024) was a historian specializing in the history of Syria and the Levant in general during the Ottoman era (1516–1918). He authored hundreds of books, articles, and book reviews concerning Levantine history, with his work

== Early life and education ==
Rafeq was born in Idlib, in northern Syria, in 1931, during French Mandatory rule (1920–1946). He obtained his primary and secondary education at the American College in Aleppo, where he learned English and French and continued his pursuit of mastering Arabic. In 1949 he enrolled in the University of Damascus, then called the 'Syrian University' where he became student of the university's history department. Rafeq's time in the Damascus university coincided with a major bustling of activity there with several prominent Syrian and Lebanese scholars serving in the department, including Umar Farrukh, George Haddad, Nur al-Din Hatum, Sa'id al-Afghani, Umar al-Hakim, Shukri Faysal, Shafiq Jabiri, Nabih Aql and Abd al-Karim Gharayba. That time coincided with the Nakba and the consequent bustling of political thought in the university, which attracted students and notable thinkers from across the Levant, as well as North Africa. According to his colleague, the historian Muhammad Adnan Bakhit, Rafeq benefited from this environment and gained knowledge in modern historical methodology, high-level Arabic and research skills and academic ethics.

== Historical writing ==
In 1958, Rafeq was sent for his PhD education by the University of Damascus to the University of London. There, he studied under the historian Peter M. Holt. An outcome of his studies there was his 1963 dissertation The Province of Damascus, 1723–1783, published under the same title in 1968. Its scope was the history of Damascus under the governors of the al-Azm family and their political conflicts with local and regional rivals, "marking an assertion of local, Syria-based interests and powerbrokers in the late Ottoman Empire", according to James A. Reilly and Elyse Semerdjian. He largely sourced this work to the archival documents of the British and French consuls in Ottoman Syria and contemporary or near-contemporary Arabic manuscripts.

The next book authored by Rafeq was the widely read Bilad al-Sham wa-Misr min al-fath al-ʿuthmani ila hamlat Nabulyun Bunabart, 1516–1798 [Bilad al-Sham and Egypt from the Ottoman Conquest to Napoleon Bonaparte's Expedition, 1516–1798] published in 1968.

== Professorship ==
Rafeq became a history professor in the University of Damascus in 1963, upon obtaining his PhD from the University of London. He remained in the department, eventually becoming its chair, until 1990. In 1979, he became a founder and editor of the department's journal, Dirasat al-Tarikhiyya ('Historical Studies'). In an effort to expand education of the Ottoman period among Syrian and Arab students in general, he wrote a comprehensive textbook of the period al-'Arab wa-al-'Uthmaniyyun, 1516–1916 ('The Arabs and the Ottomans, 1516-1916'), published in 1974.

In his studies and teachings in Damascus, Rafeq became one of the first historians of the period to make use of the sijillat (records) of the local sharia courts and waqfs (endowments or trusts), as well as the fiqh (Islamic jurisprudence) books and fatwa collections of Ottoman-era Syria. He later studied the guilds and socio-economic structures of the various quarters of Damascus, the careers and influential roles of military men in Ottoman Syria, the role of agriculture in the country, the impact of the annual Hajj caravans to Syria's economy and society, as well as the Ottoman histories of Hama and Palestine.

== Bibliography ==
- Bakhit, Muhammad Adnan (2010). "Abdul-Karim Rafeq, Friend and Colleague". In Sluglett, Peter; Weber, Stefan (eds.). Syria and Bilad al-Sham under Ottoman Rule: Essays in Honour of Abdul-Karim Rafeq. Leiden and Boston: Brill. pp. 59–64. ISBN 978-90-04-18193-9.
- Fitzgerald, Timothy J. (2010). "Bibliography of Abdul-Karim Rafeq's Published Works (To April 2010)". In Sluglett, Peter; Weber, Stefan (eds.). Syria and Bilad al-Sham under Ottoman Rule: Essays in Honour of Abdul-Karim Rafeq. Leiden and Boston: Brill. pp. 47–56. ISBN 978-90-04-18193-9.
- Freitag, Ulrike (2010). "Abdul-Karim Rafeq, Historian of Syria: Some Personal Observations". In Sluglett, Peter; Weber, Stefan (eds.). Syria and Bilad al-Sham under Ottoman Rule: Essays in Honour of Abdul-Karim Rafeq. Leiden and Boston: Brill. pp. 69–77. ISBN 978-90-04-18193-9.
- Reilly, James A.; Semerdjian, Elyse (Summer 2025). "In Memoriam: Abdul-Karim Rafeq, 1931–2024" (PDF). Syrian Studies Association Bulletin. 29 (1): 1–11.
