= Effendi (disambiguation) =

Effendi is a title of nobility.

Effendi or Efendi may also refer to:

== People ==
People with the surname or, especially in historical personalities, just an Ottoman title, include:

=== Effendi ===
- Abu Bakr Effendi (1814–1880), Ottoman qadi of Kurdish descent in the Cape of Good Hope (now South Africa) from 1862 to 1880
- Djohan Effendi (1939–2017), Indonesian politician
- Latif Effendi, pseudonym of Andrea Debono (1821–1871), Maltese trader and explorer
- Shoghi Effendi (1897–1957), Guardian of the Baháʼí Faith from 1921 to 1957

=== Efendi ===
Historical

- Abbas Wasim Efendi (1689–1760), Ottoman astronomer
- Abdülaziz Efendi (1735–1782 or 1783), Turkish physician
- Abdurrahman Bahir Efendi (Arabzade), Ottoman composer of vocal and instrumental Turkish classical music
- Agah Efendi (1832–1885), Ottoman civil servant, writer and newspaper editor
- Ahmed Resmî Efendi or Ahmed bin İbrahim Giridî (1700–1783), Ottoman Greek statesman, diplomat and author
- Ali Rıza Efendi (1839–1888), father of Mustafa Kemal Atatürk
- Çenebaz Osman Efendi, formal name Yenişehirli Osman Efendi, Ottoman diplomat
- Ebussuud Efendi (1490–1574), Hanafi Maturidi Ottoman jurist and Qur'an exegete
- Giritli Ali Aziz Efendi (1749–1798), Ottoman ambassador and author
- Halet Efendi (1761–1822), Ottoman diplomat and politician, ambassador to the court of Napoleon I between 1803 and 1806
- Hammamizade İsmail Dede Efendi (1778–1846), Ottoman composer of Ottoman classical music
- Hattat Aziz Efendi (1871–1934), Ottoman calligrapher
- Hocazade Esad Efendi (1570–1625), Şeyhülislam (Minister of Islamic Issues) in the Ottoman government
- Ishak Efendi (c. 1774–1835), Ottoman mathematician and engineer
- İsmail Zühdi Efendi (died 1806), Ottoman calligrapher
- Kamal Kaya Efendi, Turkish military officer who was in China in the 1930s
- Kazasker Mustafa Izzet Efendi (1801–1876), Ottoman composer, neyzen, poet and statesman, calligrapher
- Mahmud Celaleddin Efendi (died 1829), Ottoman calligrapher
- Mehmed Shevki Efendi (1829–1887), Ottoman calligrapher
- Mehmet Cemaleddin Efendi (1848–1917), Ottoman senior judge
- Mehmet Esad Efendi (c. 1789–1848), Ottoman historian
- Merkez Efendi, popular nickname of Musa bin Muslihiddin bin Kılıç (1463–1552), Ottoman Islamic scholar and Sufi
- Muhib Efendi, Ottoman ambassador to the court of Napoleon I between 1806 and 1811
- Mustafa Ruhi Efendi (1800–1893), a shaikh of the Naqshbandi tariqah and political leader in the Balkans
- Salih Efendi the Elder, prominent citizen of Shkodër in the 19th century
- Sami Efendi (1858–1912), Ottoman calligrapher
- Sayyid Ahmad Tawfiq Bay Sharif Efendi, Arab pan-Islamist who was in China in the 1930s
- Sünbül Efendi (1452–1529), founder of the Sunbuliyye Sufi order
- Tamburi Ali Efendi (also spelled Tanburi or Tambouri) (1836–1902), Ottoman Turkish tambur virtuoso and composer
- Tatyos Efendi or Kemani Tatyos Ekserciyan (1858–1913), Ottoman-Armenian composer of classical Turkish music
- Yahya Efendi or Molla Shaykhzadeh (1494–1570), Ottoman Islamic scholar, Sufi, and poet
- Yedikuleli Seyyid 'Abdullah Efendi (1670–1731), Ottoman calligrapher
- Yesarizade Mustafa Izzet Efendi (died 1849), Ottoman calligrapher

Contemporary

- Efendi Abdul Malek (born 1978), Malaysian footballer
- Emin Efendi, Azerbaijani hip hop record producer and television presenter
- Gusripen Efendi (born 1986), Indonesian footballer
- Mursyid Effendi (born 1972), Indonesian footballer
- Samira Efendi (born 1991), Azerbaijani singer, also known by the mononym Efendi
- Sugeng Efendi (born 1998), Indonesian footballer
- Sukasto Efendi (born 1981), Indonesian footballer

== Places ==
- Karadzor, formerly Efendi, a town in Armenia
- Norashen, Gegharkunik, formerly Efendi, a town in Armenia

== Other uses ==
- Effendi, a novel in the Arabesk trilogy, by Jon Courtenay Grimwood
- Effendi (horse), a racehorse
- Effendi, a ship named Lalla Rookh built in 1976, named Effendi for some years under the Norwegian flag
- "Oh Effendi", a 1974 song by 10cc on Sheet Music
