= Ahmed Resmî Efendi =

Ottoman historian

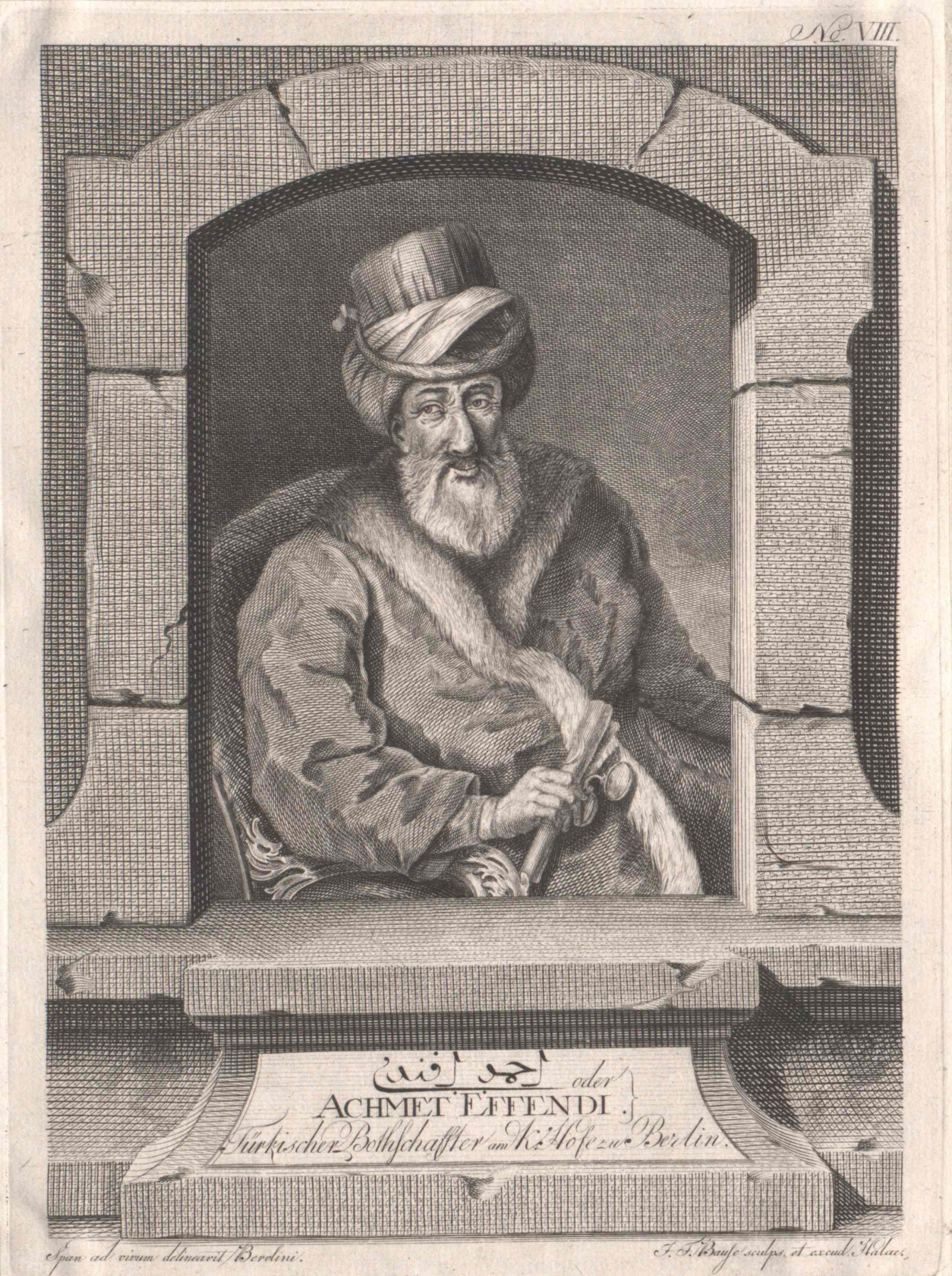
- Engraving, c. 1767–1783

Ottoman Ambassador at Vienna
- In office 1757–1758

Ottoman Ambassador at Berlin
- In office 1763–1764

Ottoman Ambassador at Russia
- In office 1768–1774

Chief Ottoman negotiator of Treaty of Küçük Kaynarca
- In office 1774–1774

Personal details
- Born: 1700 Resmo, Girit Eyalet, Ottoman Empire (today Rethymno, Greece)
- Died: 1783 (aged 82–83) Constantinople, Ottoman Empire

Ahmed Resmî Efendi (English, "Ahmed Efendi of Resmo"), also called by some Arabic sources as Ahmed bin İbrahim Giridî ("Ahmed the son of İbrahim the Cretan"), was an Ottoman Greek statesman, diplomat and author of the late 18th century. In international relations terms, his most important – and unfortunate – task was to act as the chief of the Ottoman delegation during the negotiations and the signature of the Treaty of Küçük Kaynarca. In the literary domain, he is remembered for various works among which his sefâretnâme recounting his embassies in Berlin and Vienna occupy a prominent place. He was Turkey's first ever ambassador in Berlin.

== Early life ==
Ahmed Resmi was born into a family of Greek descent in the Cretan town of Rethymno, which was known as Resmo in the Ottoman Empire in the year 1700. According to Muhammed Muradî, the source for the little that is known concerning his early life, Ahmed Resmî arrived in İstanbul towards his forties, in 1734. Most sources credit him with expertise in the calligraphic and epistolary arts. Rising through the Ottoman bureaucracy, he allied himself with a circle of reformers, who transformed diplomatic relations of the Ottomans with Europe in the 18th century and established some of the first privately endowed public libraries of Istanbul.

When his father-in-law and first patron Tavukçubaşı Mustafa, a diplomat and one of the prominent figures in grand vizier Koca Mehmed Ragıp Pasha's entourage, died in 1749, Ahmed Resmî began writing his first work, the bibliographical compilation of Ottoman chief scribes "Sefinet ür-rüesa". It was in this period that he wrote "İstinas fi ahval el-efras", to demonstrate his scribal and literary skills, celebrating the spring ritual of releasing the royal horses for grazing and which served as an encomium to the Sultan Mahmud I. These works also served as a means of introduction to potential patrons, such as grand vizier Köse Bahir Mustafa Pasha.

Ahmed Resmî was appointed in late 1757 to an embassy to Vienna to announce the accession of Mustafa III to the throne. In 1749, he also composed "Hamilet el-kübera", a biographical list of the chief black eunuchs (kızlar ağaları) of the Palace.

The embassy to Vienna was followed by a similar appointment, the first ever Turkish embassy to the court of Frederick the Great in Berlin in 1763/1764. After both embassies, Ahmed Resmî submitted detailed reports on the geography of his passage and the politics of the courts he encountered. In the case of the Berlin embassy, he left behind not just an account of diplomatic niceties but also a portrayal of Frederick and the description of the Seven Years' War. His tentative observations inaugurated a new emphasis for the Ottoman Empire on the need to study European politics.

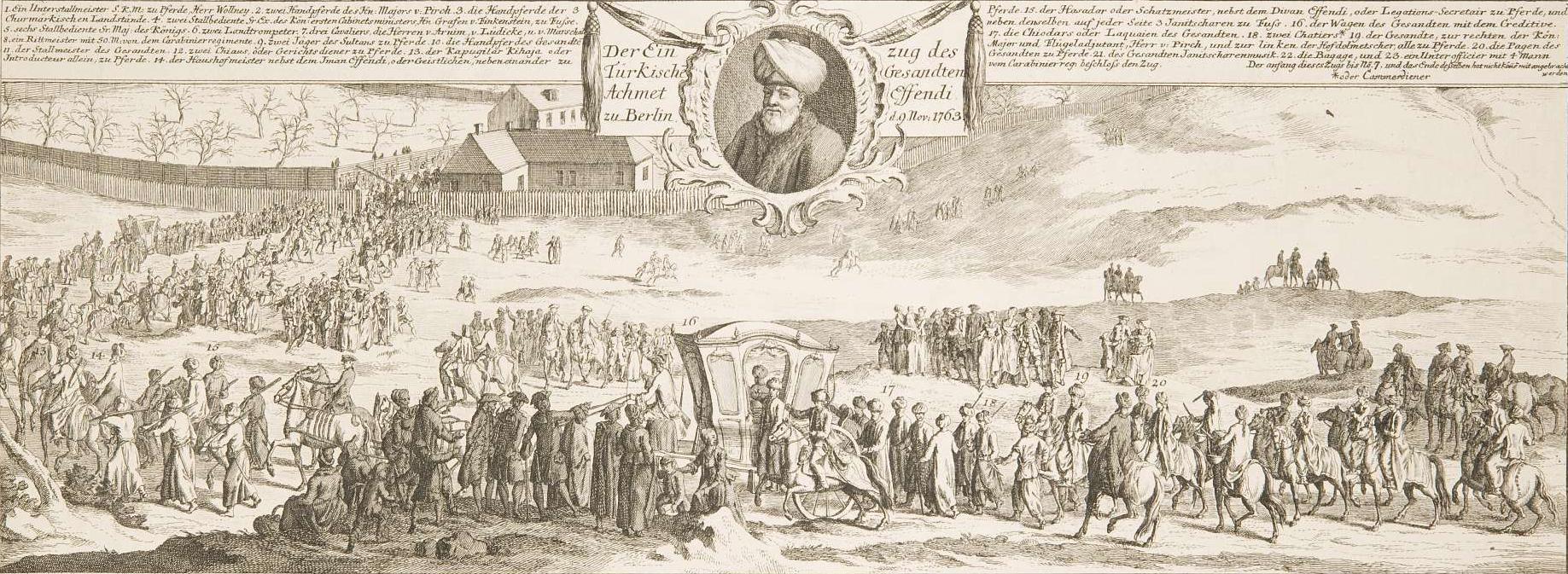
Ahmed Resmî Efendi's arrival in Berlin on 9 November 1763.

Upon his return from Berlin, he was appointed chief correspondence officer (mektupçu) to the grand vizier. In 1765, he became chief sergeant-at-arms (çavuşbaşı) and began his long connection with Muhsinzade Mehmed Pasha, who was twice appointed grand vizier. Among his other appointments to the highest offices was his brief posting as second-in-command (sadaret kethüdası) to grand vizier Moldovanlı Ali Pasha in 1769 while the grand vizier was on the Bulgarian battlefront. He served in this capacity again with Muhsinzade Mehmed Pasha from 1771 until the grand vizier’s death at the end of the Russo-Turkish War, 1768-1774. Ahmed Resmî was present at many of the war councils on the battlefield and was noted for his largesse toward wounded soldiers. His quarrels with and observations on the head of the Ottoman delegation during the ten-month truce between the two episodes of the war, Çenebaz Osman Efendi or Yenişehirli Osman Efendi, by the name either of a town near Bursa or now in Greece, was recorded by him in one of the most vivid accounts of the war.

Even though the above-mentioned three posts were considered stepping-stones to the office of grand vizier, he never achieved that status. It is likely that Ahmed Resmî’s regular and scathing criticism of the state of Ottoman military organization played a major role in this turn of events.

Ahmed Resmî acted as first plenipotentiary (murahhas-ı evvel) to the Küçük Kaynarca peace negotiations in 1774 and became one of the signatories of the resulting treaty. He understandably disappeared from the appointment rolls for some time after 1775. Ahmed Resmî resurfaced one last time as chief of the palace cavalry bureau (süvari mukabelecisi) under grand vizier Halil Hamid Pasha, probably in recognition of his continuous service behind the scenes in difficult negotiations with Russia over the future of the Crimea and the Tatars. Ahmed Resmî died in August 1783, shortly before the Aynalıkavak Convention ceding the Crimea to Catherine II was signed in early 1784. One son is said to have preceded Ahmed Resmî to the grave; no other information has been discovered to date concerning his family life.

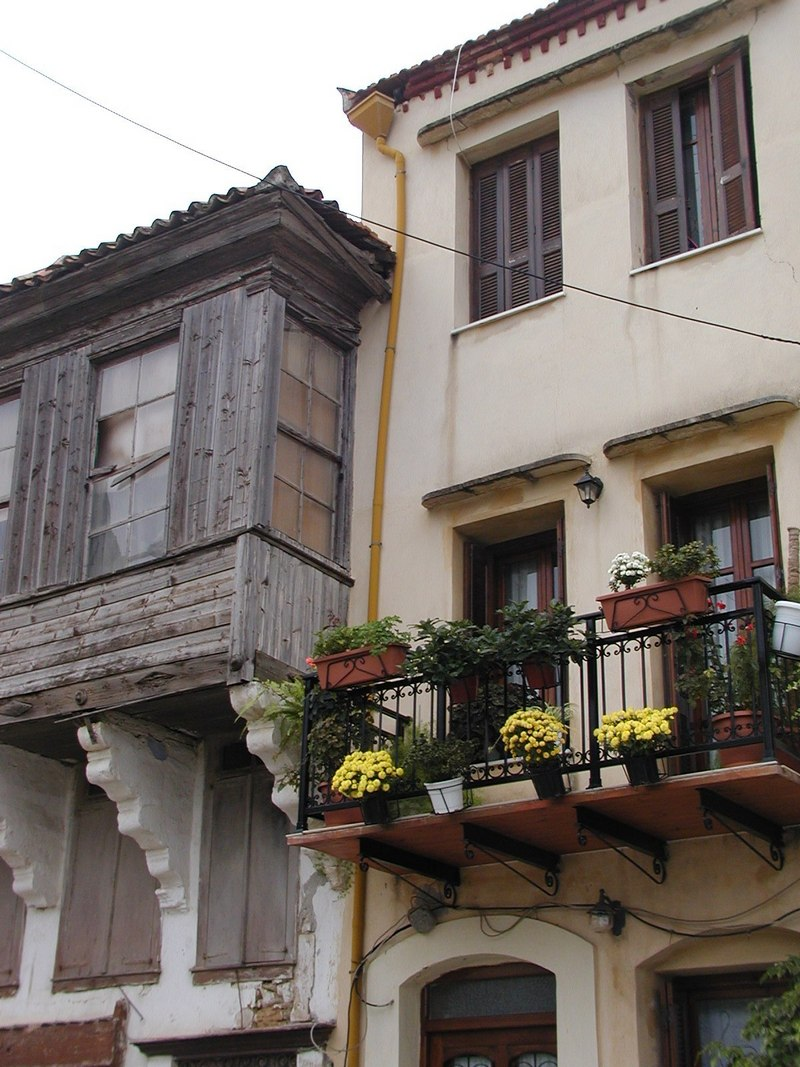
Turkish houses in Resmo (Rethymno) where Ahmed Resmî Efendi was born and had spent the first forty years of his life

== Literary works ==
- Hamiletü’l-kübera (1749): A biographical list of the chief black eunuchs from Mehmed Agha (1574–1590) up to Moralı Beşir Agha (the second eunuch with the same name, who served between 1746 and 1752) dedicated to Koca Ragıp Mehmed Pasha. It includes biographies of thirty-eight eunuchs, focusing on their origins and professional careers. A concluding part addresses the history of the downfall and execution of Moralı Beşir Agha and provides as much justification for, as explication of, the events.
- Hülasat el-itibar (1781): Critical and satirical history of the Russo-Turkish War, 1768-1774. Ahmed Resmî was on the battlefield and acutely aware of the failings of the Janissary corps. The writing is accessible, indignant, sometimes comic, but sincere and passionate.
- Layiha: A memorandum presented to grand vizier İvazzade Halil Pasha in 1769 concerning the need for reorganization and control of military headquarters.
- Layiha: A political memoir on the Russians during the temporary truce and the negotiations to end the 1768-1774 war presented to Muhsinzade Mehmed Pasha and Abdürrezzak Efendi, chief negotiator on the battlefront in 1772. Ahmed Resmî presented this Layiha as the Ottomans undertook ultimately abortive negotiations with the Russians between 1772 and 1773, in which he pressed for peace, arguing that the Russians were badly overextended, and that both sides should recognize their military and territorial limitations. Such language was still novel in Ottoman negotiations. Ahmed Resmî’s view in this last work as well as in Hülasat el-itibar represents an understanding of the balance of power diplomacy he observed in the courts of Vienna and Berlin.
- Sefaretname-i Ahmed Resmî or Sefaretname-i Prusya: Report of Ahmed Resmî’s embassy to Berlin in 1763-1764 containing a logbook for the journey, reflections on the cities of passage, as well as a record of the official meetings with Frederick the Great, and many reflections on the rise of Frederick, his kind of rule, and his parsimony. Both this and the Vienna embassy report have been edited and transcribed numerous times, and discussed at length in English and Turkish.
- Sefinet er-rüesa or Halifet er-rüesa: This is the only biographical compilation of Ottoman chief scribes (reis ül-küttab) until 1744, started by Ahmed Resmî around 1749, and continued by Süleyman Faik until 1804. The work ends with the entries on Ahmed Resmî’s own patrons, Tavukçubaşı Mustafa and Koca Ragıp Mehmed Pasha, and constitutes the main source of information on these two personalities.
- Viyana Sefaretnamesi: Report of Ahmed Resmî’s embassy to Vienna in 1757-1758, written immediately upon his return.

His two works on Vienna and Berlin embassies have been translated into German by Joseph von Hammer in 1809.

== See also ==
- Sefâretnâme
- Yirmisekiz Mehmed Çelebi
- Giritli Ali Aziz Efendi
- List of Turkish diplomats
- Cretan Turks
- Çenebaz Osman Efendi

== Sources ==
- Virginia Aksan (1995). An Ottoman Statesman in War and Peace: Ahmed Resmî Efendi 1700-1783. Brill Academic Publishers. ISBN 978-90-04-10116-6.
- "Ahmed Resmî Efendi". ottomanhistorians.com. Ottoman Historians. Archived from the original on 7 September 2006.
