= The Health Museum (Istanbul) =

- Sağlık Müzesi
- Established: 1918
- Location: Sultanahmet, Istanbul, Turkey
- Coordinates: 41°01′03″N 28°56′26″E
- Type: Science museum
- Founder: Hikmet Hamdi
- Architect: gothic, baroque and orientalist

The Health Museum is a museum located in Sultanahmet, Istanbul. The museum was founded by Hikmet Hamdi in 1918 and first exhibited tables and figures related to venereal diseases, before expanding to infectious and social diseases. Since its reorganizations in 1928 and 1939, the museum now has physiology and anatomy departments to help primary and secondary school students with the study of cancer, tuberculosis, mental health, nutritional diseases, dental health, and infectious diseases.

== History ==
The museum's building was originally built as a masonry mansion in 1875 by Salih Efendi, Director of Defter-i Hakani Senedat (Recorder of deeds). Nigâr Hanım, an enlightened woman and a poet of the period who married Salih Efendi's son, resided in this mansion in the first years of her marriage and intermittently thereafter. The mansion included gothic, baroque, neo-classical, and orientalist architectural and ornamental elements in an eclectic structure, making it an important example of civil architecture. The Mansion served for a period as Conductor of School, which formed the core of the Yıldız Technical University (1911–1914).

During the armistice years, the mansion was used by the National Defense Association. A cinema studio was established on the ground floor, where documentary films were shot to strengthen cooperation between the army and the people. Binnaz, one of the first silent films of Turkish cinema, was shot at the mansion. After the First World War, when the Allies officially occupied Istanbul, the Health Museum's building was seized by Italian soldiers. Mimar Sinan Fine Arts University used part of the building intermittently from 1920 to 1921.

In the first years of the Republic, the Ministry of Health and Social Aid took a close interest in the museum and its important role in the field of health. The museum was then established in 13 provinces, including Ankara, Aksaray, Bursa, Urfa, Ordu, Trabzon, Edirne, Konya, Giresun.

== Present ==
The Istanbul Health Directorate initiated studies in 2011, which led to the reopening of The Health Museum in 2019, functioning within the norms of contemporary museology. There are goals for the museum to have multi-purpose training halls and a library to educate society on health and to be an interactive museum with technological infrastructure.
