= Yirmisekizzade Mehmed Said Pasha =

Grand Vizier of the Ottoman Empire from 1755 to 1756

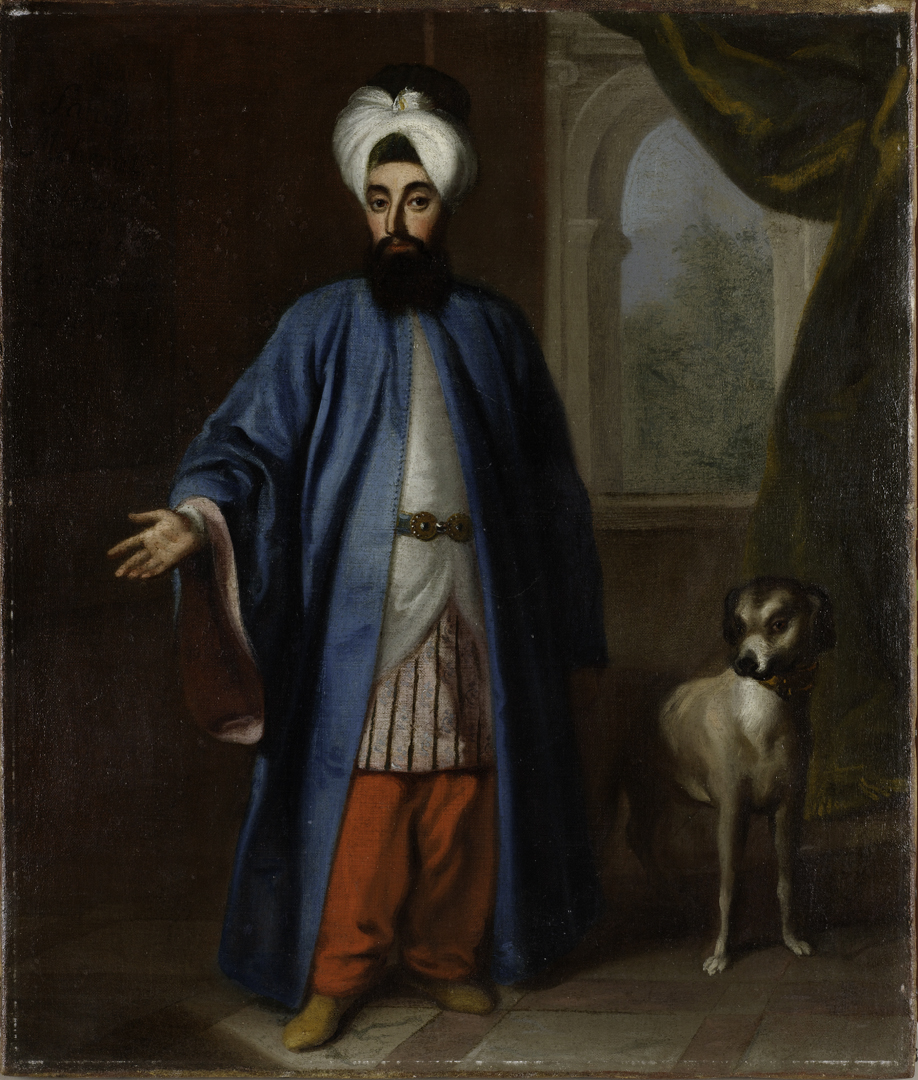
- Mehmed Said in Stockholm as ambassador in 1733, by Georg Engelhard Schröder (now in the Pera Museum).

Grand Vizier of the Ottoman Empire
- In office 25 October 1755 – 1 April 1756
- Preceded by: Köse Bahir Mustafa Pasha
- Succeeded by: Köse Bahir Mustafa Pasha

Personal details
- Born: Unknown
- Died: October 1761 Istanbul, Ottoman Empire
- Parent: Yirmisekiz Mehmed Çelebi (father)
- Profession: Statesman, Diplomat

Yirmisekizzade Mehmed Said Pasha (died October 1761), earlier in his life known as Mehmed Said Efendi (sometimes spelled Sahid Mehemet Effendi in France), was an Ottoman statesman and diplomat. He was Grand Vizier of the Ottoman Empire from October 25, 1755, to April 1, 1756.

He was a son of Yirmisekiz Mehmed Çelebi, ambassador of the Ottoman Empire to France in 1720–21. Mehmed Said was of Georgian descent through his father. His epithet Yirmisekizzade, meaning "son of twenty-eight" in Turkish, is a reference to his father's own epithet Yirmisekiz ("twenty-eight"), a reference to Yirmisekiz Mehmed Çelebi's membership in the 28th battalion (orta) of the Janissaries early in his life. He already accompanied his father during this first mission as his personal secretary. He is said to have enjoyed the French culture and lifestyle tremendously, and ended up speaking French fluently.

Mehmed Said was himself dispatched for an embassy in Paris in 1742, as well as another more historically significant one in Sweden in 1733 and Poland, which led to his writing a sefaretname like his father. In Sweden, he succeeded Mustapha Aga as ambassador.

He briefly served as the Shaykh al-Islam between 1749 and 1750.

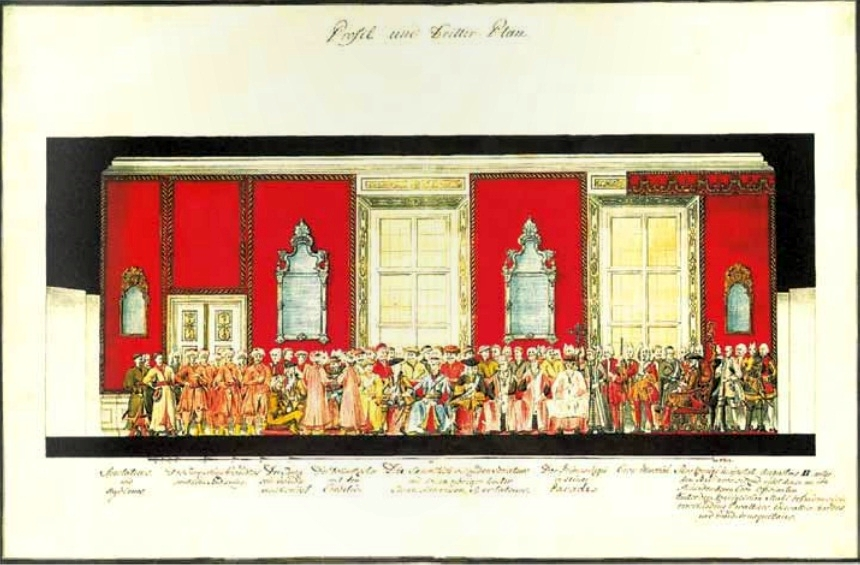
Reception of Mehmed Said, then ambassador to Poland, in the Audience Room at the Royal Castle, Warsaw in 1731 (watercolour painting by Joachim Daniel von Jauch).

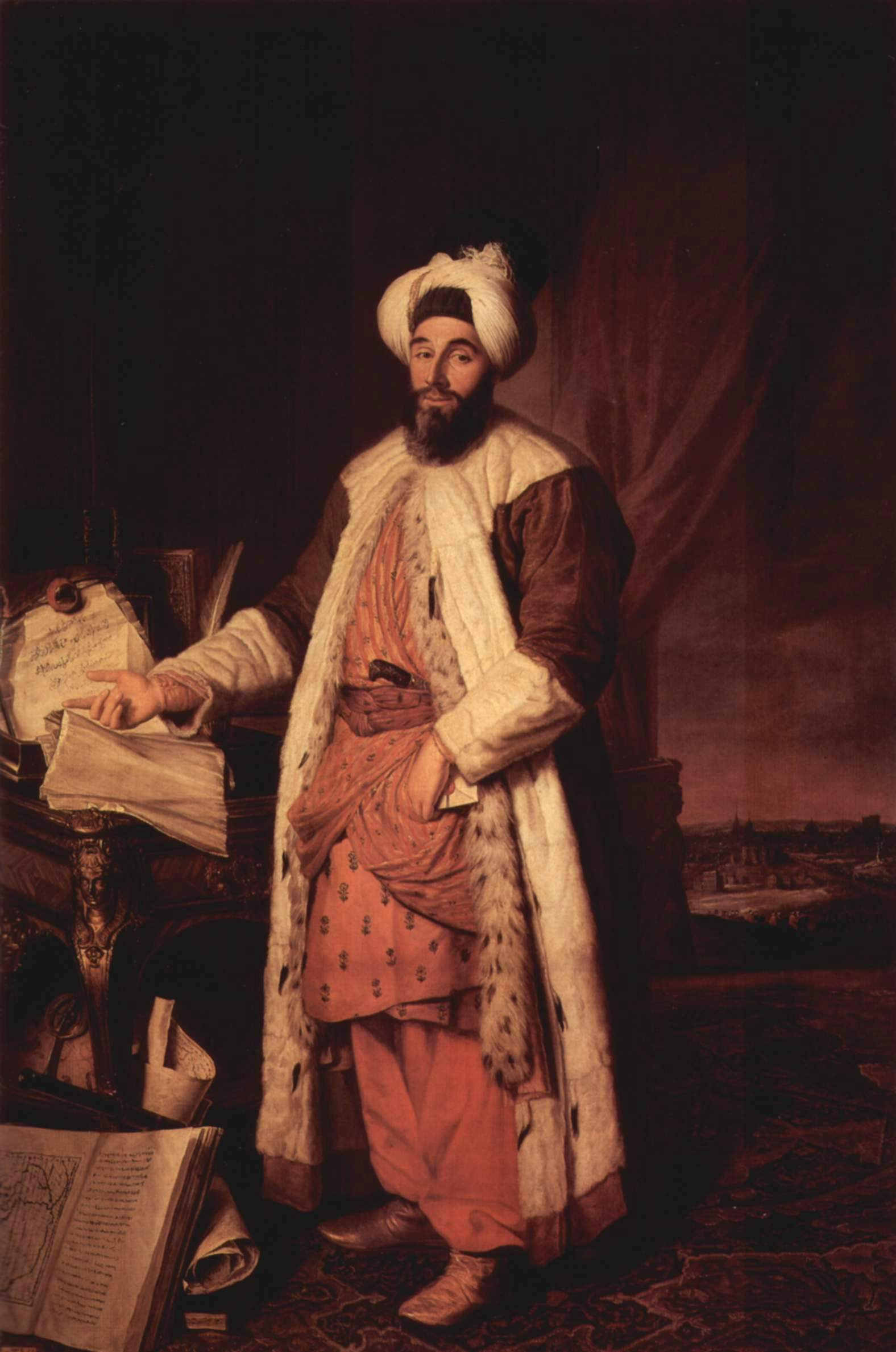
Mehmed Said (then an Efendi) in Paris as ambassador in 1742, by Joseph Aved (now in the Musée de Versailles).

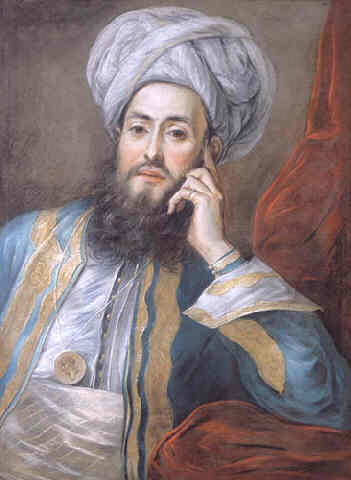
Mehmed Said in Paris in 1742, by Charles-Antoine Coypel.

== See also ==
- Franco-Ottoman alliance
- List of Turkish diplomats

== Notes ==
Political offices
Preceded by Silahdar Bıyıklı Ali Pasha	Grand Vizier of the Ottoman Empire; 25 October 1755 – 1 April 1756	Succeeded by Köse Bahir Mustafa Pasha
Preceded by Sa'deddin Pasha al-Azm	Ottoman Governor of Egypt; 1757–1758	Succeeded by Köse Bahir Mustafa Pasha
