= Said Pasha =

Said Pasha may refer to:

- Mehmed Said Pasha (1830–1914), Ottoman statesman and grand vizier
- Sa'id of Egypt (1822–1863), Wāli of Egypt and Sudan
- Yirmisekizzade Mehmed Said Pasha (d. 1761), Ottoman ambassador
