= Yirmisekiz Mehmed Çelebi =

Ottoman statesman (c. 1670 – 1732)

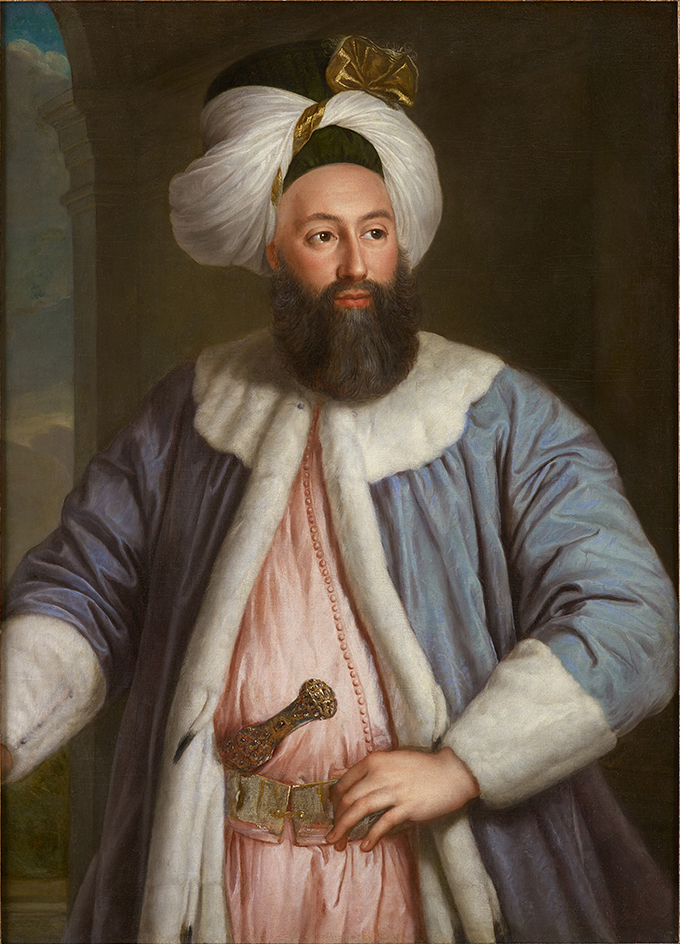
- Portrait by Pierre Gobert, commissioned by the Bâtiments du Roi, 1724
- Title: Ambassador

Personal life
- Born: c. 1670 Edirne, Ottoman Empire (now Turkey)
- Died: 1732 Lefkoşa, Cyprus
- Children: Yirmisekizzade Mehmed Said Pasha
- Notable work: Sefâretnâme (Book of Embassy)
- Occupation: Statesman, diplomat, writer

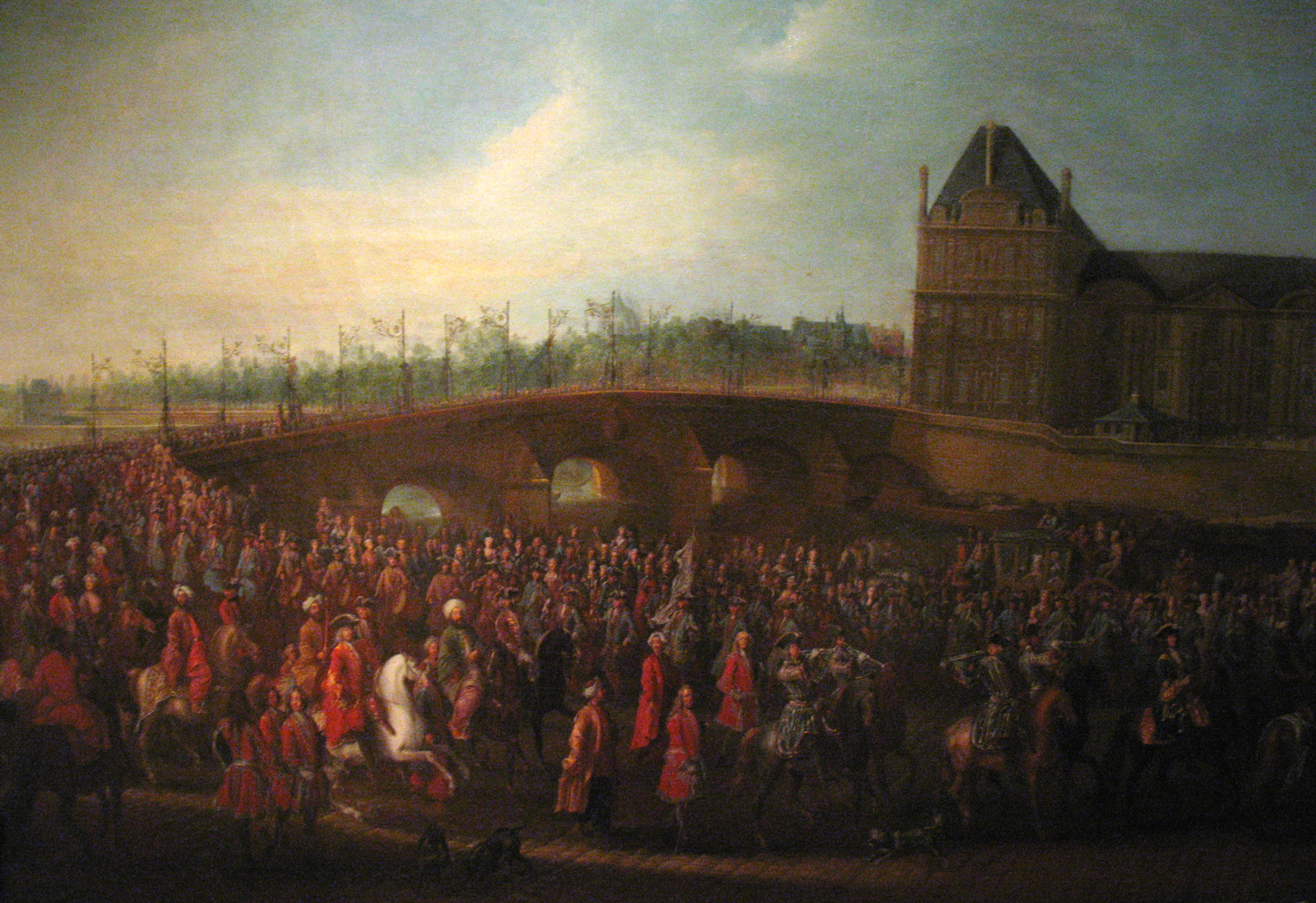
Departure of Mehemet Effendi from the Tuileries, on 21 March 1721. Sortie de l'ambassadeur, 1721. Pierre-Denis Martin (1663–1742). Musée Carnavalet.

Yirmisekiz Mehmed Çelebi Efendi (c. 1670 – 1732), also Mehmed Efendi (sometimes spelled Mehemet Effendi in France), was an Ottoman statesman who was designated as ambassador by Sultan Ahmed III to Louis XV's France in 1720. He is remembered for his account of his embassy mission (a sefâretnâme, "book of embassy").

Yirmisekiz Mehmed Çelebi was born in Edirne to a family of Georgian descent. His date of birth is unknown. He was the son of an officer in the Janissary corps, Süleyman Ağa, who died during a campaign to Pécs. Mehmed Çelebi himself was enrolled in the Janissary corps, and since he had served in the 28th battalion ("orta" in Janissary terminology) of the corps, he came to be known by the nickname Yirmisekiz ("twenty-eight" in Turkish) for his entire life. His descendants, including his son who became a grand vizier, also carried the name in the form of Yirmisekizzade ("son of twenty-eight").

He rose through the military hierarchy and then oriented his career to the service of the finances of the state, first as superintendent for the Ottoman mint, and then as chief imperial accountant (defterdar) by the reign of Ahmed III. In 1720, while in that position, he was assigned as Ottoman ambassador to Louis XV's France and sent to Paris. His embassy of eleven months was notable for being the first ever foreign representation of a permanent nature for the Ottoman Empire. On his return to the Ottoman capital, Mehmed Çelebi presented his contacts, experiences and observations to the Sultan in the form of a book.

His sefâretnâme is one of the most important examples of the homonymous genre, both for its literary merits and in terms of the insights it provides on his time and environment. He describes his journey to France, the 40-days quarantine near Toulon for fear of plague, his journey through Bordeaux towards Paris, his reception by Louis XV, the ceremonies and the social events to which he participated, notably a night at the theatre, places of interest in Paris, the curiosity with which he examines the Western culture and the curiosity he aroused among his Western interlocutors, for instance his days of fasting in Ramadan, July/August 1720, becoming a reason for public gathering for curious Parisian women.

Aside from setting the pace and nature of the long-term trend of Westernization in the Ottoman Empire, his embassy also had immediate repercussions in the Ottoman Empire, notably in the form of the first printing house managed by İbrahim Müteferrika, a Hungarian convert, with help from Esad of Ioannina, a Greek, which published books in Turkish, having been opened in the same year of 1720 as a direct consequence of Mehmed Çelebi's mission in Paris, and under the personal protection and auspices of his son Yirmisekizzade Mehmed Said Pasha, later grand vizier. Constantinople's renowned Sadabad Gardens, one of the symbols of the Tulip Era were also largely inspired by the gardening techniques used in Tuileries Palace, described in length by the author/ambassador. His book was translated into French in 1757 and also into other Western languages afterwards.

After another embassy mission this time in Egypt, Yirmisekiz Mehmed Çelebi who was deeply associated with the Tulip Era, was exiled to Cyprus after the Patrona Halil uprising which put an end to that era and to Ahmed III's reign. He died in Famagusta in 1732 and was buried in the courtyard of Buğday Mosque in that city.

His son Yirmisekizzade Mehmed Said Paşa regained imperial favor shortly afterwards and was dispatched himself for an embassy in Paris in 1742, as well as another more historically significant one in Sweden and Poland, which led to his writing another sefaretname.

== Gallery ==
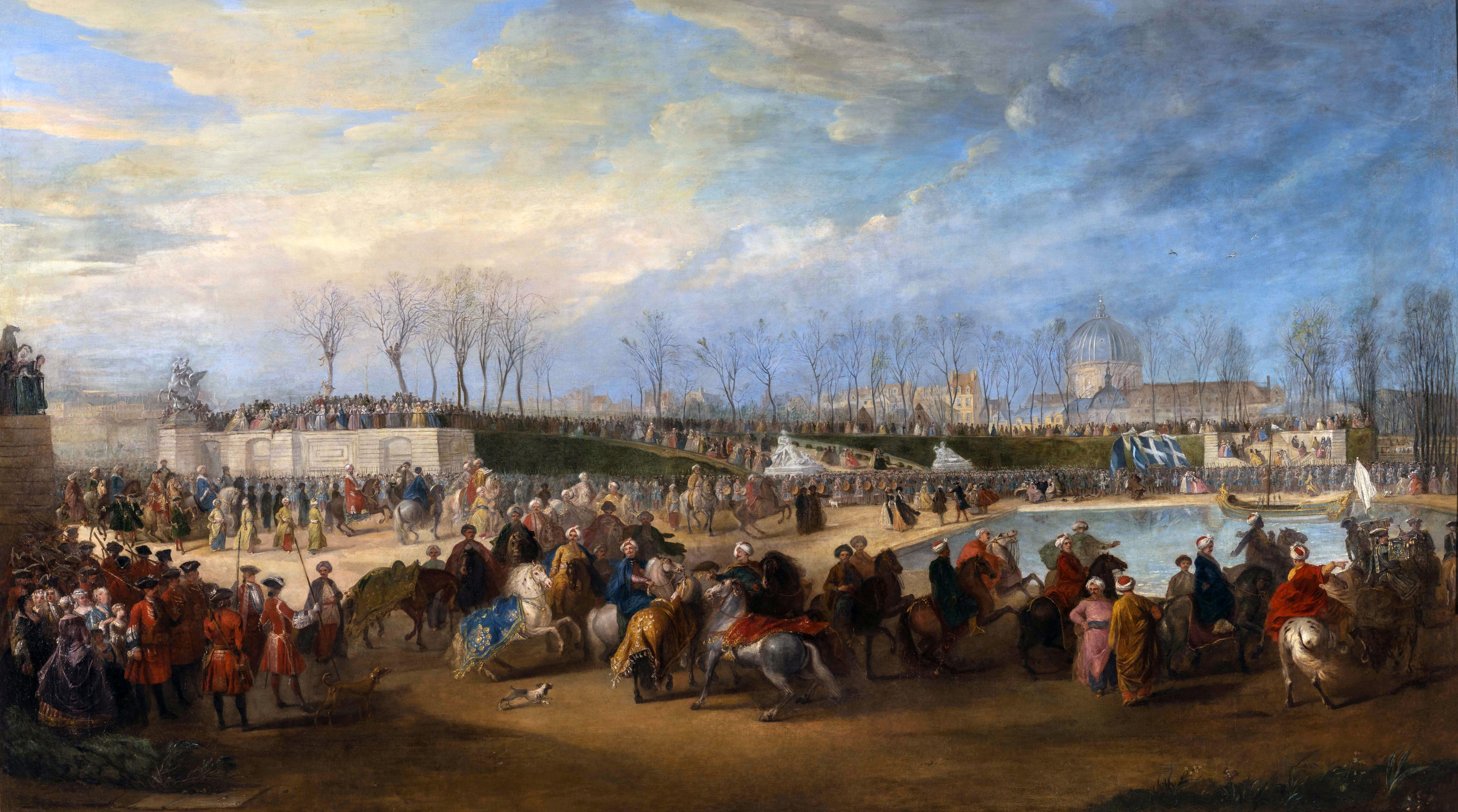
Mehmed Efendi arrives at the Tuileries on 21 March 1721. Charles Parrocel.

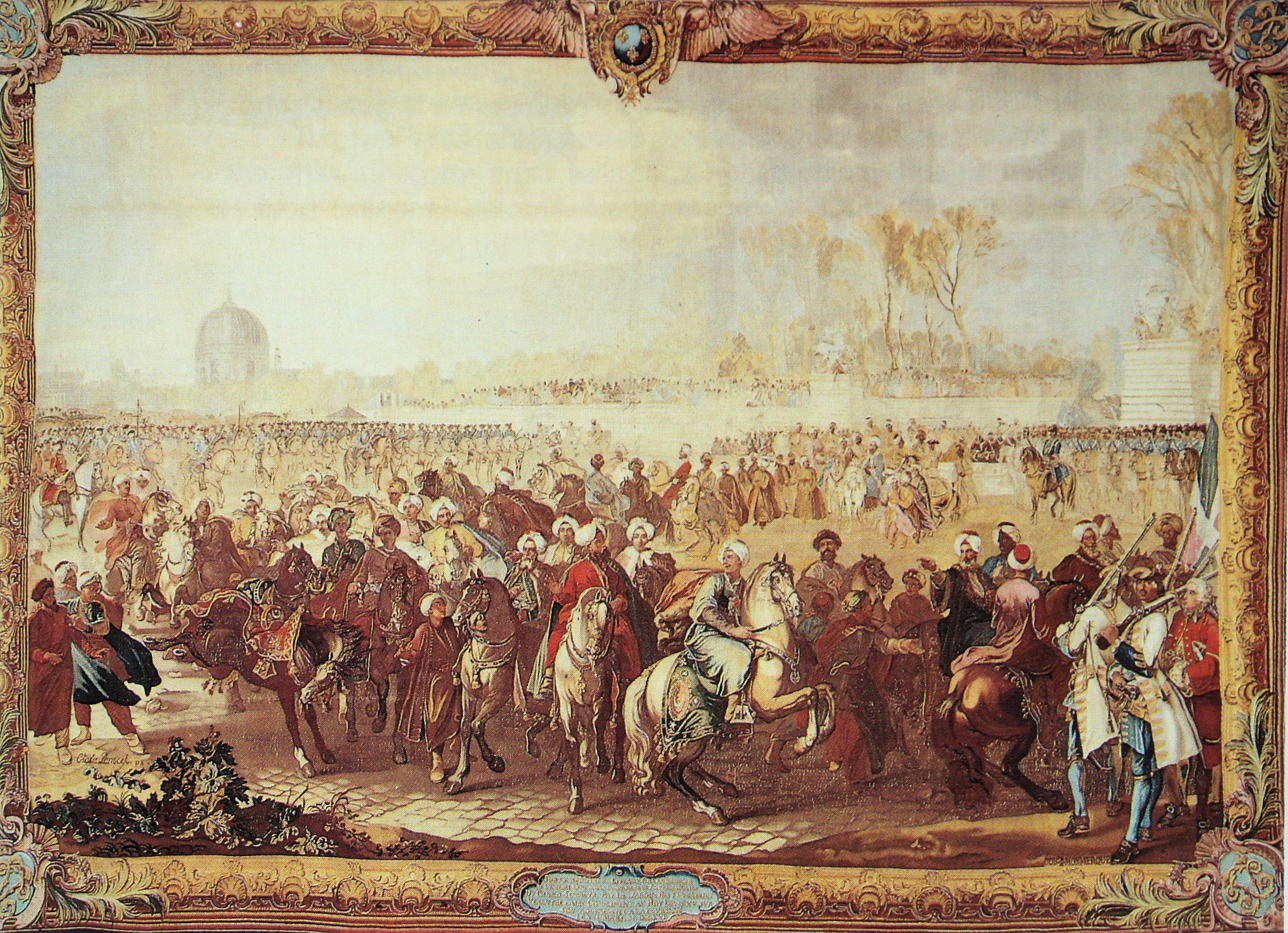
La sortie de l'ambassadeur turc du Jardin des Tuileries, Gobelins Manufactory, 1734–1737.

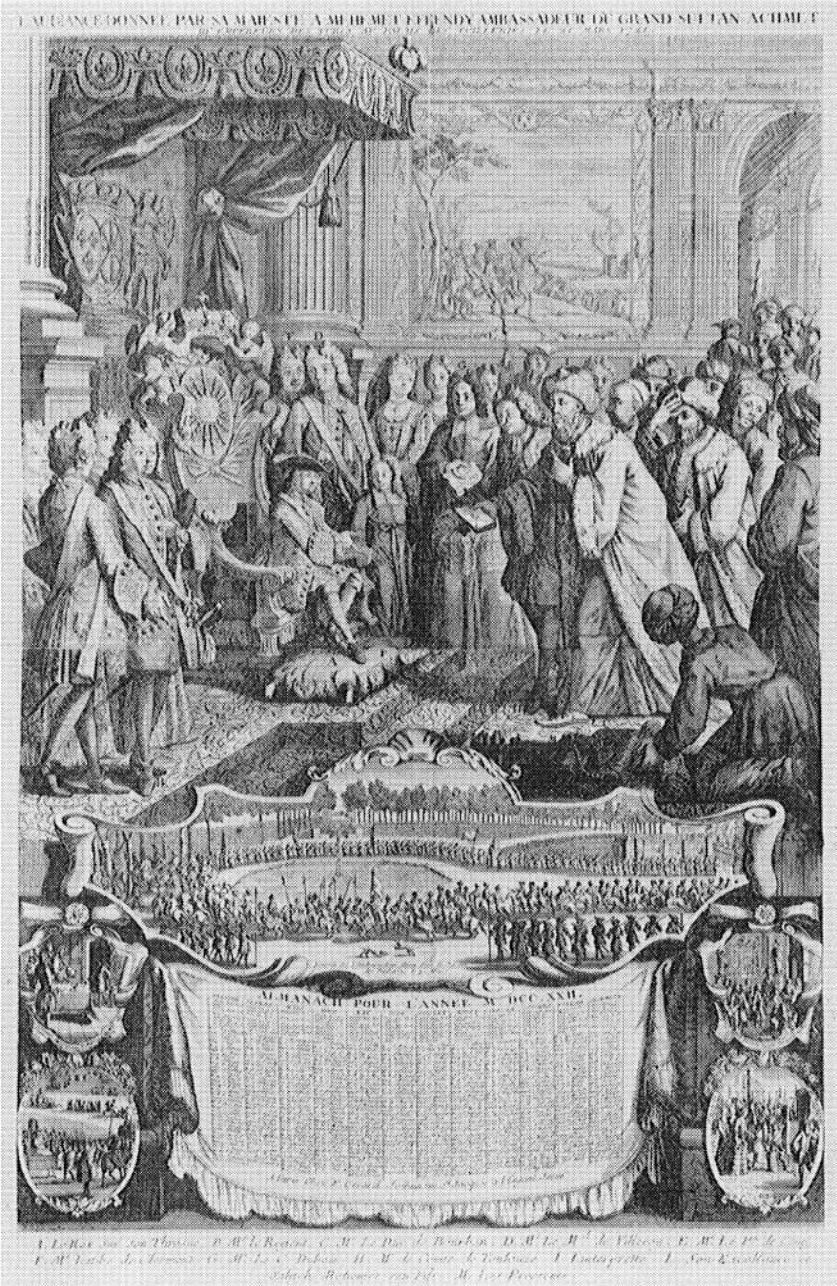
Mehmed Efendi with the child Louis XV.

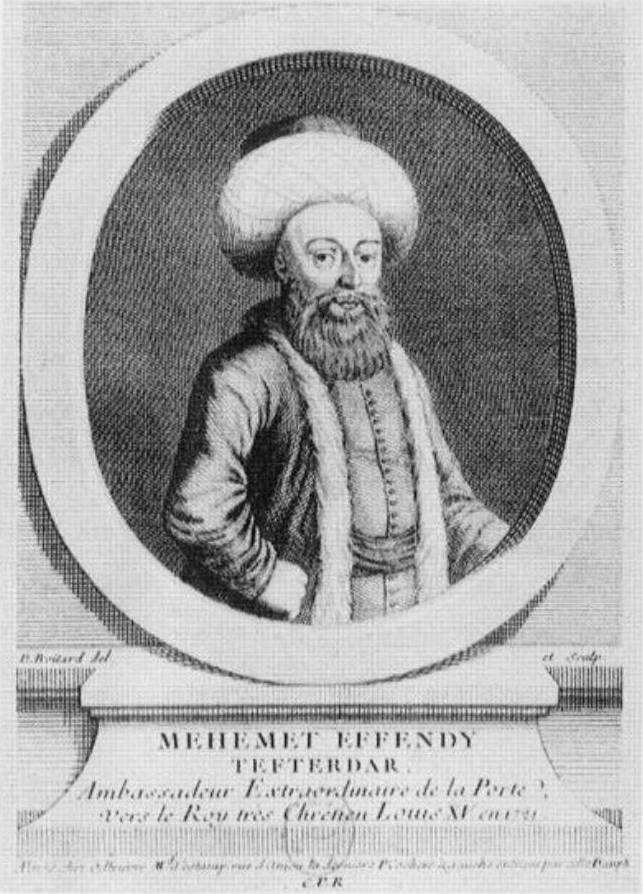
Mehmed Efendi in Paris.

== Sources ==
- Mehmed efendi, Le paradis des infidèles: Relation de Yirmisekiz Çelebi Mehmed efendi, ambassadeur ottoman en France sous la Régence, traduit par Julien-Claude Galland, intr. & notes par Gilles Weinstein (Paris: François Maspéro, 1981).
- Fatma Müge Göçek, East Encounters West: France and the Ottoman Empire in the Eighteenth Century (New York & Oxford: Oxford University Press, 1987).
- Tomas Guarisco, Un ambassadeur ottoman à Toulouse sous la Régence : expérience diplomatique, échanges culturels et interactions sociales (M.Phil. Thesis, dir. Mathieu Grenet, Université Toulouse 2 Jean-Jaurès, 2017).

== See also ==
- Franco-Ottoman alliance
- List of Turkish diplomats
