= Mustapha Aga =

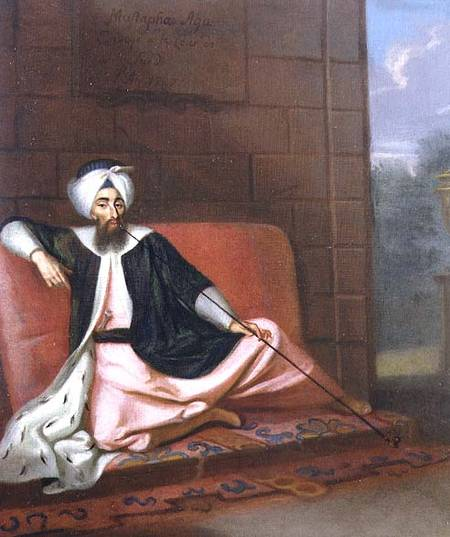
Portrait of Mustapha Aga, emissary to the Swedish Court, 1727. George Engelhardt Schroeder (1684-1750).

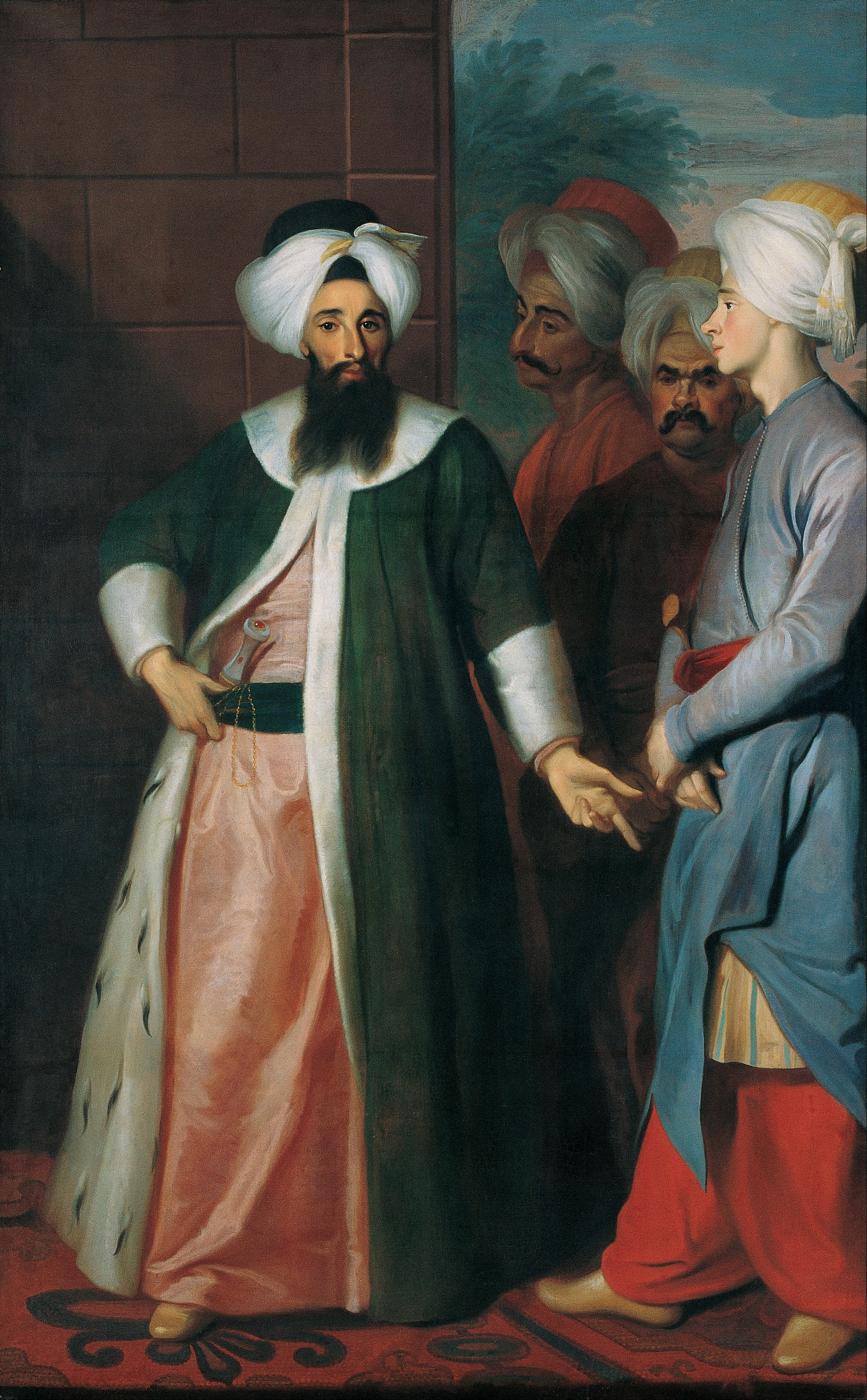
Kozbekçi Mustafa Agha and his Retinue

Kozbekçi Mustafa Agha, known as Mustapha Aga in Sweden, was an Ottoman ambassador to the Swedish court in 1727. One of his missions was to obtain a repayment of a royal debt which had been incurred by Charles XII of Sweden, but he failed in his mission. He was painted smoking nargile by George Engelhardt Schroeder (1684–1750). 18th century oil painting is part of the Pera Museum Orientalist Painting Collection.

He was succeeded by Yirmisekizzade Mehmed Said Efendi in his role as ambassador.
