= Chorbaji =

Military rank in the Ottoman Empire

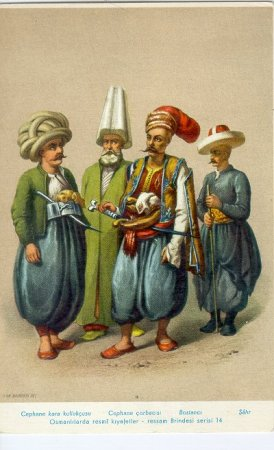
Depiction of Ottoman military uniforms by Giovanni Jean Brindesi showing an Ammunition Officer and guards

Chorbaji (sometimes variously transliterated as tchorbadji, chorbadzhi, tschorbadji) (Turkish: çorbacı) (English: Soup Seller) was a military rank of the corps of Janissaries in the Ottoman Empire, used for the commander of an orta (regiment), i.e., approximately corresponding to the rank of colonel. The word is pronounced [tʃoɾbaˈdʒɯ] in Turkish and literally means "person in charge of çorba (soup)".

In several predominantly Christian areas of the Ottoman Empire, such as the current North Macedonia, Serbia and Bulgaria, as well as many parts of Eastern Anatolia, the term chorbaji (Macedonian and Serbian: чорбаџија, čorbadžija; Bulgarian: чорбаджия, chorbadzhiya Western Armenian: չորպաճի "ch'orbaji") was also used as a title for (Christian) members of the rural elite, heads of villages and other rural communities and rich peasants. The Ottomans employed them in various administrative positions, such as that of tax collector and in courts of law. Since the 19th century in independent Bulgaria, the term largely fell out of use as the Ottoman system was abandoned. During Ottoman rule the word τσορμπατζης (pronounced chorbajis) was used with the meaning of "mayor" in the Greek Christian communities in the whole area of Thrace and in Western Asia Minor.

The word is still in use in vernacular Turkish and Bulgarian with the meaning of "boss". It is also a slang word and family name among Syrians, Lebanese, (where it is pronounced as Shorbaji/Sharbaji), Albanians, Bulgarians, Turks, Ukrainians and many others. (e.g. a vice-governor of Odesa is named Ivan Chorbadzhi - Иван Чорбаджи).

A variant of the word, Qoʻrboshi or Kurbashi, was also used to indicate the commander of a Basmachi guerrilla detachment in Central Asia, during their struggle against the Red Army between 1916 and 1934.
