= Çenebaz Osman Efendi =

Çenebaz Osman Efendi (Osman Efendi the Chatterer or the Loudmouthed), formally named as Yenişehirli Osman Efendi (either from Yenişehir near Bursa, or from Giannitsa, now in Greece, which was also called "Yenişehr-i Fener" in Ottoman times) in Ottoman sources, was an Ottoman diplomat who was the first plenipotentiary in the first peace conference, held in Focşani, today in Romania, starting August 19, 1772, among the several that were organised during the ten-month truce (May 10, 1772 – March 21, 1773) in the course of the Russo-Turkish War (1768–1774). His Russian counterparts were Grigory Grigoryevich Orlov, Catherine II's lover and counsellor, and Aleksey Mikhailovich Obreskov (1720–1787), Russia's peacetime ambassador in Istanbul.

His name remains a byword to this day, thanks to his highly original perception of international relations and the unusual methods he developed while conducting diplomatic negotiations. He regained notoriety in Turkey's everyday culture from an anecdote about him related in a book by the Turkish novelist Kemal Tahir.

He started by burying an amulet into the ground on the way the members of the Russian delegation were to walk each day to render themselves to the conference hall. He also kept by his side a large sack full of gold coins at all times during the pourparlers, shuffling the coins noisily and gazing at his interlocutors with meaningful eyes, to the great puzzlement of the Russian negotiators. Proud of his rhetorical skill, he thought he could wear down the Russians with his diatribe of words and he sometimes just shouted at them meaninglessly to keep the pace of his speech. A first-hand Ottoman witness, named below, wrote that, in the end, the Russians had got used to listening to him as they would listen to a kaval.

Russian Field-Marshal Count Pyotr Rumyantsev noted in his memoirs: "If we say this efendi is crazy, it would be improper, so let us just say that he is smart but his is not like any other intelligence, we have ever experienced.". In his account of the war, Ahmed Resmi Efendi, a fervent advocate of immediate peace, placed the blame for the failure of the first round of negotiations, centered on the question of Crimea, squarely on Çenebaz Osman Efendi's shoulders.

The same Ahmed Resmi Efendi was to be the one to appose his signature on the 1774 Treaty of Küçük Kaynarca, disastrous for the Ottomans, at the end of the second round of the war resumed in March 1773.

== See also ==
- Ahmed Resmî Efendi

== Sources ==
- İsmet Bozdağ (2006). Kemal Tahir'in sohbetleri (Conversations with Kemal Tahir) (in Turkish). Emre Yayınları. ISBN 9944-334-05-7.
- Metin Bezikoğlu. "The deterioration of Ottoman administration in the light of the Ottoman-Russian War of 1768-1774" (PDF). Bilkent University.
- Virginia Aksan (2007). Ottoman Wars: An Empire Besieged (Modern Wars In Perspective) - Chapter IV: An Ottoman Statesman in War and Peace: Ahmed Resmi Efendi (1700-1783). Longman. ISBN 978-0-582-30807-7.
