= Georg Engelhard Schröder =

Swedish painter (1684–1750)

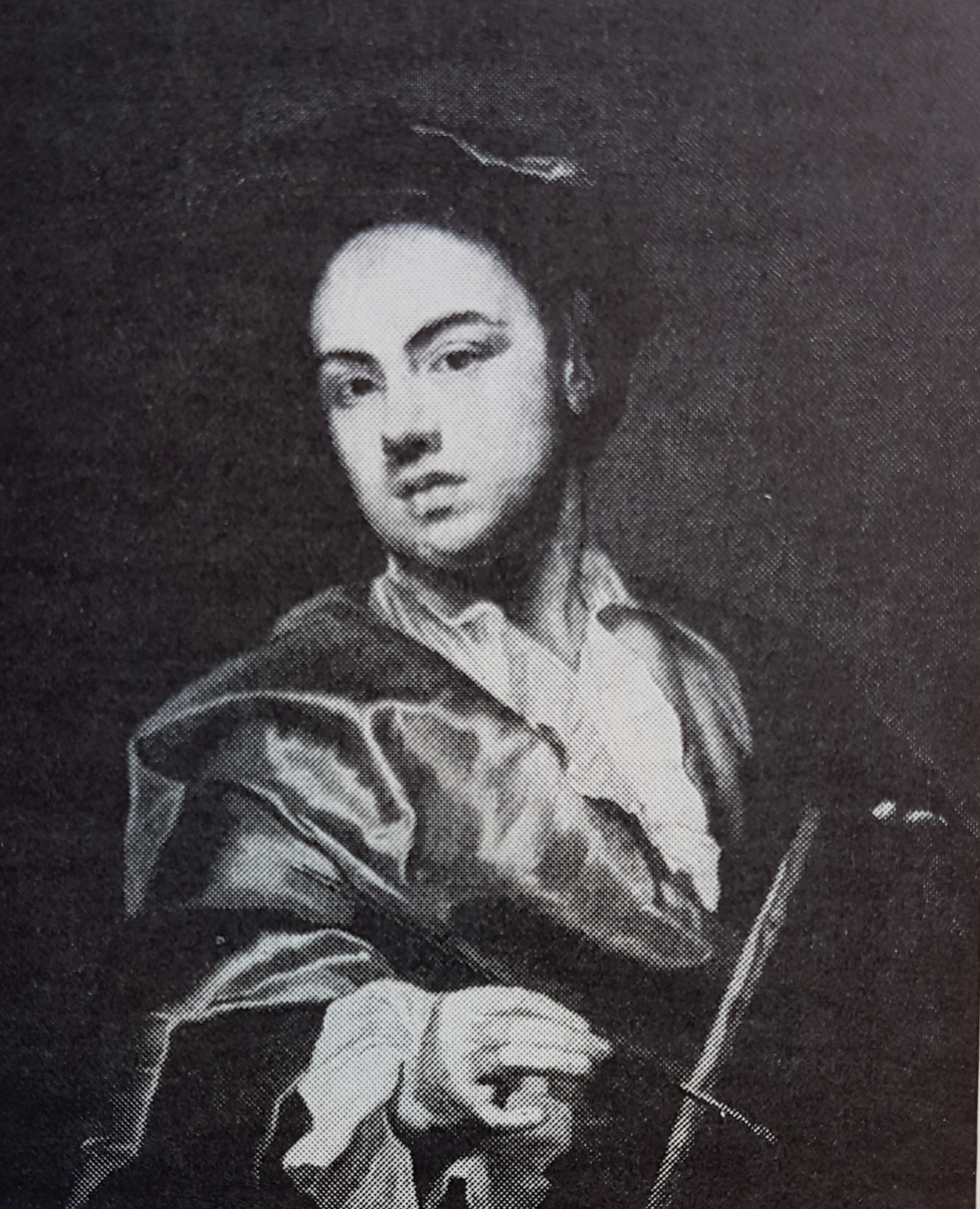
Georg Engelhard Schröder självporträtt

Georg Engelhard Schröder (31 May 1684 – 17 May 1750), also spelled George Engelhardt Schroeder, was a Swedish painter.

== Life ==
=== Early life ===
Schroder's father, Veit Engelhard Schröder (died 1710), was a goldsmith from the German city of Nuremberg. In 1670 Veit and his wife Lucia Lindemeyer emigrated to Stockholm, where Georg was born fourteen years later. In his early years he studied under the painter David von Krafft (1655–1724), only leaving his studio in 1703 to travel abroad. In the following twenty-one years Schröder visited most of Europe. He began with time in northern Germany before moving to Italy, where he stayed five years in Venice, copying old masters, painting views of the city and coming into contact with the pastellist Rosalba Carriera (1675–1757).

He next moved to Rome, where he was inspired by Baroque artists such as Carlo Dolci (1616–1686), Carlo Maratta (1625–1713) and Francesco Trevisani (1656–1746). He also used a quick and light style of drawing, typical of Italian art of the time. In Paris he gained new impetus and influence from the painter Noël-Nicolas Coypel (1690–1734), before seven years in London, where he was influenced by the portraiture of Godfrey Kneller (1646–1723) and Michael Dahl.

=== Return to Sweden ===
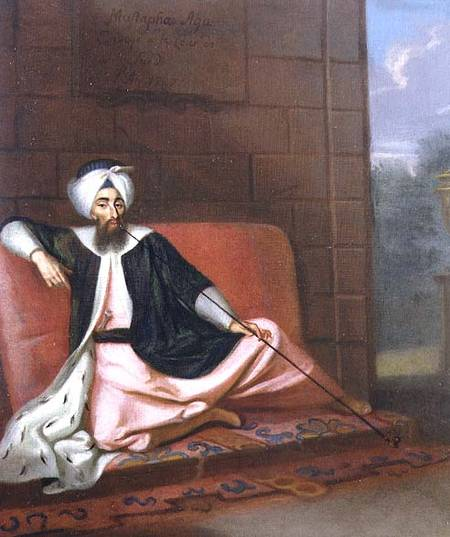
Schröder's 1727 portrait of Mustapha Aga.

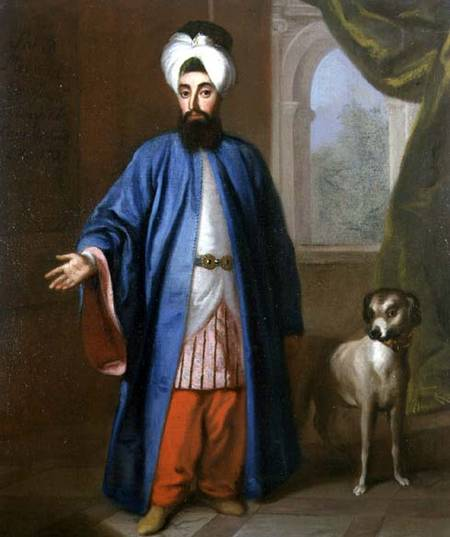
Schröder's 1733 portrait of Yirmisekizzade Mehmed Said Efendi.

In December 1724, after the death of David von Krafft, Schröder was ordered back to Sweden to take over from his old teacher as court portraitist. Soon afterwards, in 1727, Schröder married Anna Birgitta Spöring. Frederick I of Sweden highly valued Schroder, who produced several portraits of Frederick and his queen Ulrika Eleonora. Around the same time he made two well-known paintings of ambassadors of the Ottoman Empire to the Swedish court: Mustapha Aga in 1727, and Yirmisekizzade Mehmed Said Efendi (later Grand Vizier of the Ottoman Empire) in 1733.

In 1745 Schröder was appointed an advisor at court and he amassed a moderate fortune from all the commissions he gained. In the 1740s Gustaf Lundberg (1695–1786) brought a new French-influenced style to Sweden and demand for Schroder's worked dropped - this meant he was one of the last 18th-century Swedish painters whose predominant influence was Italian art. One of his most notable pupils was Alexander Roslin (1718–1793).

== Selected works ==
=== Altarpieces ===
- Hedwig-Eleonora Church, Stockholm: Crucifixion, 1738
- Drottningholm Palace Church, Uppland: The Last Supper
- German Church, Stockholm: The Last Supper
- Norrtälje Church, Uppland: The Last Supper
- Mariefred Church, Södermanland: several paintings
- Överenhörna Church, Södermanland: Altarpiece, 1736
- Växjö Cathedral, former altarpiece (now in the north aisle), 1733

=== Other ===
- Uppsala University, Uppland: John the Baptist Preaching
- Gothenburg Museum of Art, Göteborg: Apelles Painting Venus
- Nationalmuseum, Stockholm: The Four Elements
- Drottningholm Palace, Uppland: The Three Graces
- Stockholm University: A Small Allegory on the Estates of the Swedish Kingdom
- Royal Swedish Academy of Fine Arts, Stockholm: Self portrait, 1729
