= Sefâretnâme =

Turkish literary genre

Sefāret-nāme (سفارت نامه), literally the book of embassy, was a genre in the Turkish literature which was closely related to seyahatname (the book of travels), but was specific to the recounting of journeys and experiences of an Ottoman ambassador in a foreign, usually European, land and capital. Sefâretnâme were edited by their authors with a view to their presentation to the Sultan, and to his high administration, thus also bearing a semi-official character, their objective being to make them "feel" the foreign country in question, as much as informing on it. For this reason, and for the literary qualities that were sought in order to attain their objective, they remain of lasting interest for the general reader. One may draw certain parallels with the Venetian traditional obligation imposed upon the Republic's ambassador in foreign lands - to compose a detailed report on that land, its government, life, customs, culture, finances, crops, industries, etc., which he would use upon returning home to write a lucid and concise summary, to be read aloud before the Grand Council. The success of the mission largely depended upon his skills in composing and delivering his oration, while the detailed report was lodged in the archives of the Republic.

The first example of the genre is admitted to be the Kara Mehmed Çelebi sefâretnâme, relating his embassy in Vienna in 1665. Outstanding examples of the genre, mostly dating from the 18th century, are of particular value both in lasting literary terms and for the insights they provide for the Ottoman intelligentsia's perception of Western Europe at a time when that part of the world had visibly started to overtake other geographies of the world, including the Ottoman Empire, in terms of science, culture and development. Ottoman attempts to understand the reasons for the growing gap can explain the more and more frequent dispatch of ambassadors through the 18th century, who were later to have a permanent presence in European capitals, as well as the multiplication of sefâretnâme.

The sense of curiosity their authors convey in regard to the Western culture they were examining was fully reciprocated by the curiosity they aroused among their Parisian and Berliner interlocutors, most of whom were getting in contact with Turks for the first time. The vivid accounts of the contacts and the respective commentaries made thereof draw the reader's curiosity to this day.

Among notable sefâretname, those below can be cited;

- Sefaretnâme of Yirmisekiz Mehmed Çelebi, who was Turkey's first ambassador in Paris in 1720,
- Sefaretnâme of Ahmed Resmî Efendi, who was Turkey's first ambassador in Berlin in 1763/1764,
- Sefaretnâme of Giritli Ali Aziz Efendi, on his first mission as Turkey's ambassador to Prussia in 1796.

There are up to forty examples of sefâretnâme, written by Ottoman ambassadors who held office in the 18th century and early-19th century in various posts including London, Paris, Berlin, Stockholm, Russia, Poland ("Lehistan" in Ottoman terminology), Italy, Spain, Iran, India, Morocco and Bukhara. Those with a reduced literary outset, presented more in the form of a professional and topical memorandum, were termed as takrir.

== See also ==
- Seyahatname
- Turkish literature
- Osman Aga of Temesvar
- Letters from Turkey
