= Karadzor =

Karadzor Քարաձոր
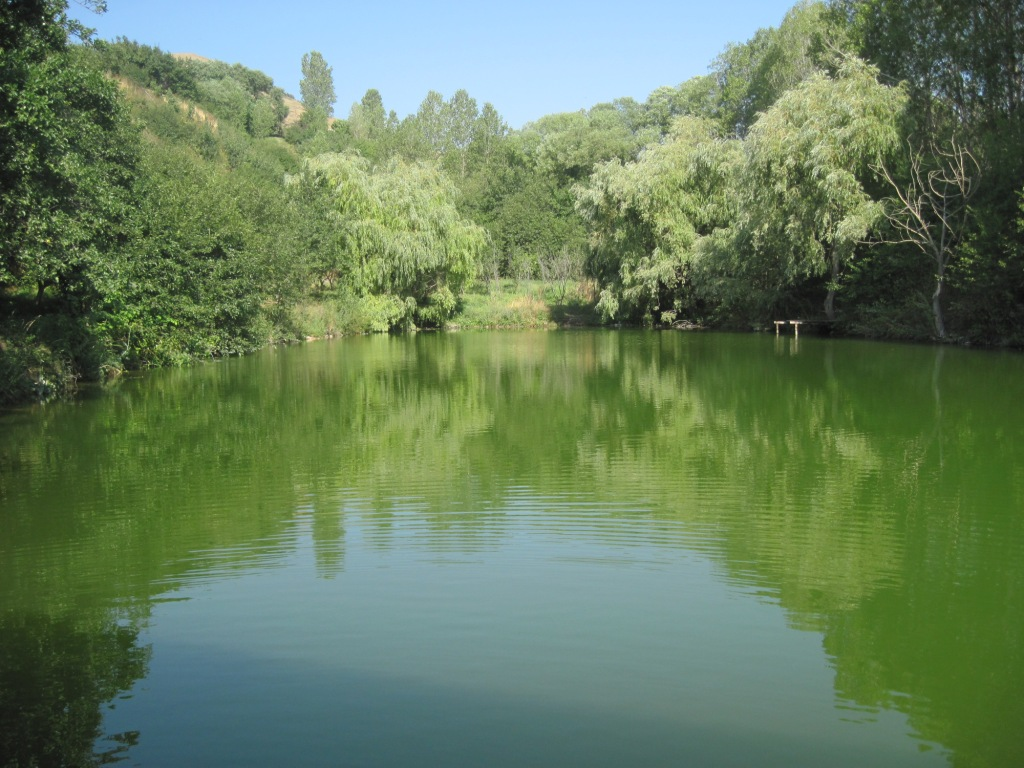

- Location within Armenia
- Coordinates: 40°50′51″N 44°19′00″E
- Country: Armenia
- Marz (Province): Lori Province
- Elevation: 1,550 m (5,090 ft)

Population (2011)
  - Total: 331
- Time zone: UTC+4 ( )
  - Summer (DST): UTC+5 ( )

Karadzor (Armenian: Քարաձոր) is a town in the Lori Province of Armenia.
