= Treaty of Küçük Kaynarca =

Treaty ending the Russo-Turkish War of 1768–1774

Treaty of Kuchuk-Kainarji
- Type: Commercial treaty, peace treaty
- Signed: 21 July [O.S. 10 July] 1774
- Location: Küçük Kaynarca, Dobruja
- Negotiators: (Russian Empire) Nicholas Repnin; (Ottoman Empire) Ahmed Resmî Efendi; (Ottoman Empire) İbrahim Münib Efendi
- Signatories: (Russian Empire) Pyotr Rumyantsev; (Ottoman Empire) Muhsinzade Mehmed Pasha
- Parties: Russian Empire; Ottoman Empire
- Languages: Italian, Russian, Ottoman Turkish

The Treaty of Küçük Kaynarca (Turkish: Küçük Kaynarca Antlaşması; Russian: Кючук-Кайнарджийский мир), formerly often written Kuchuk-Kainarji, was a peace treaty signed on 21 July [O.S. 10 July] 1774, in Küçük Kaynarca (today Kaynardzha, Bulgaria) between the Russian Empire and the Ottoman Empire, ending the Russo-Turkish War of 1768–1774 with major concessions to Russia. The concessions to Russia were not merely territorial; not only was the Crimean Khanate (not Crimea proper) effectively ceded to Russia, but Russia also gained the right to construct a Russian Orthodox church in Constantinople, claiming to be the protector of the Orthodox Christians in the Ottoman Empire. This was a pretext for frequent and numerous interventions in the decades to follow. Ottoman Christians started to feel more empowered as European and Christian powers demonstrated their rising influence and political power. Access to Europe's political networks, markets and educational institutions created a class privilege for Ottoman Christians, and scholars often regard the treaty as a turning point for relations between Ottoman Christians and the European nations.

The treaty was a milestone in the history of the decline of the Ottoman Empire, as for the first time a foreign power had a say in the governance of the Porte in assuming direct responsibility for the fate of the Empire's Orthodox Christian subjects.

== Description ==
Following the recent Ottoman defeat at the Battle of Kozludzha, the Treaty of Kuchuk-Kainarji ended the Russo-Turkish War of 1768–74 and marked a defeat of the Ottomans in their struggle against Russia. The Russians were represented by Field-Marshal Count Pyotr Rumyantsev while the Ottomans were represented by Muhsinzade Mehmed Pasha. The treaty was a most humiliating blow to the once-mighty Ottoman realm. It would also stand to foreshadow several future conflicts between the Ottomans and Russia. It would be only one of many attempts by Russia to gain control of Ottoman territory.

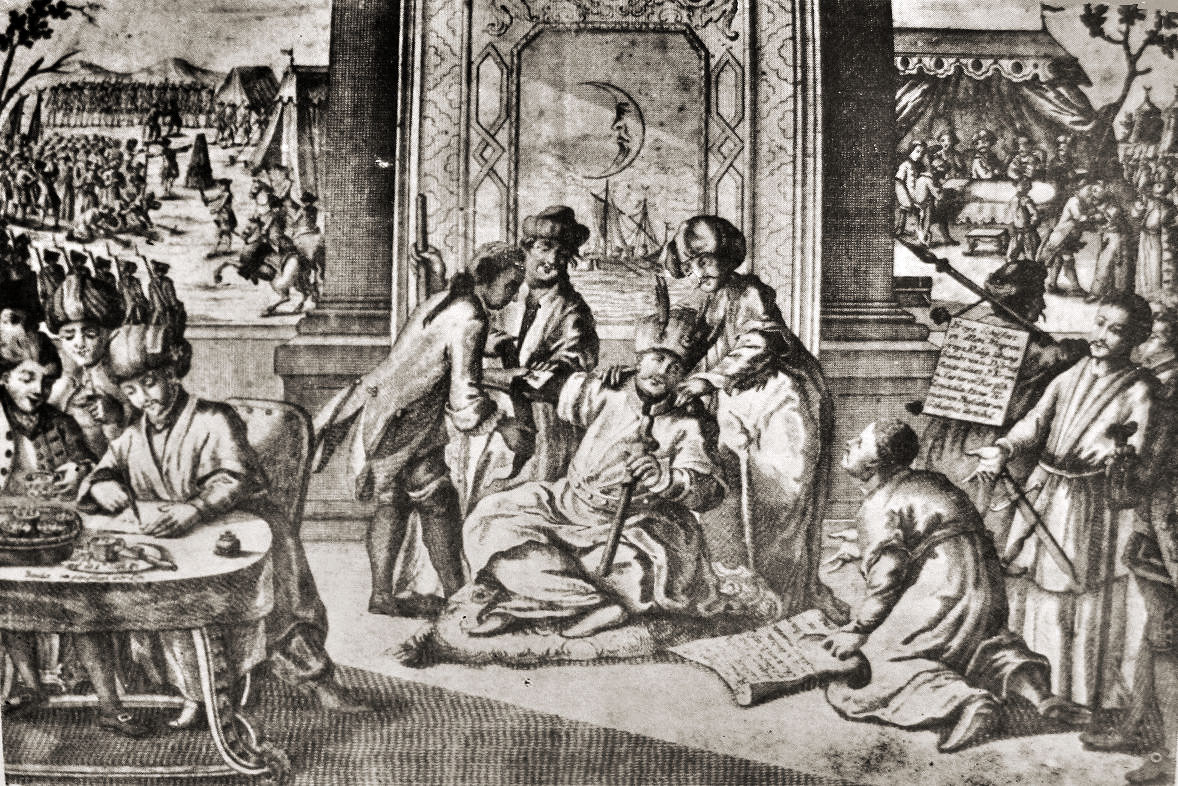
Contemporary engraving related to the Kuchuk-Kainarji treaty

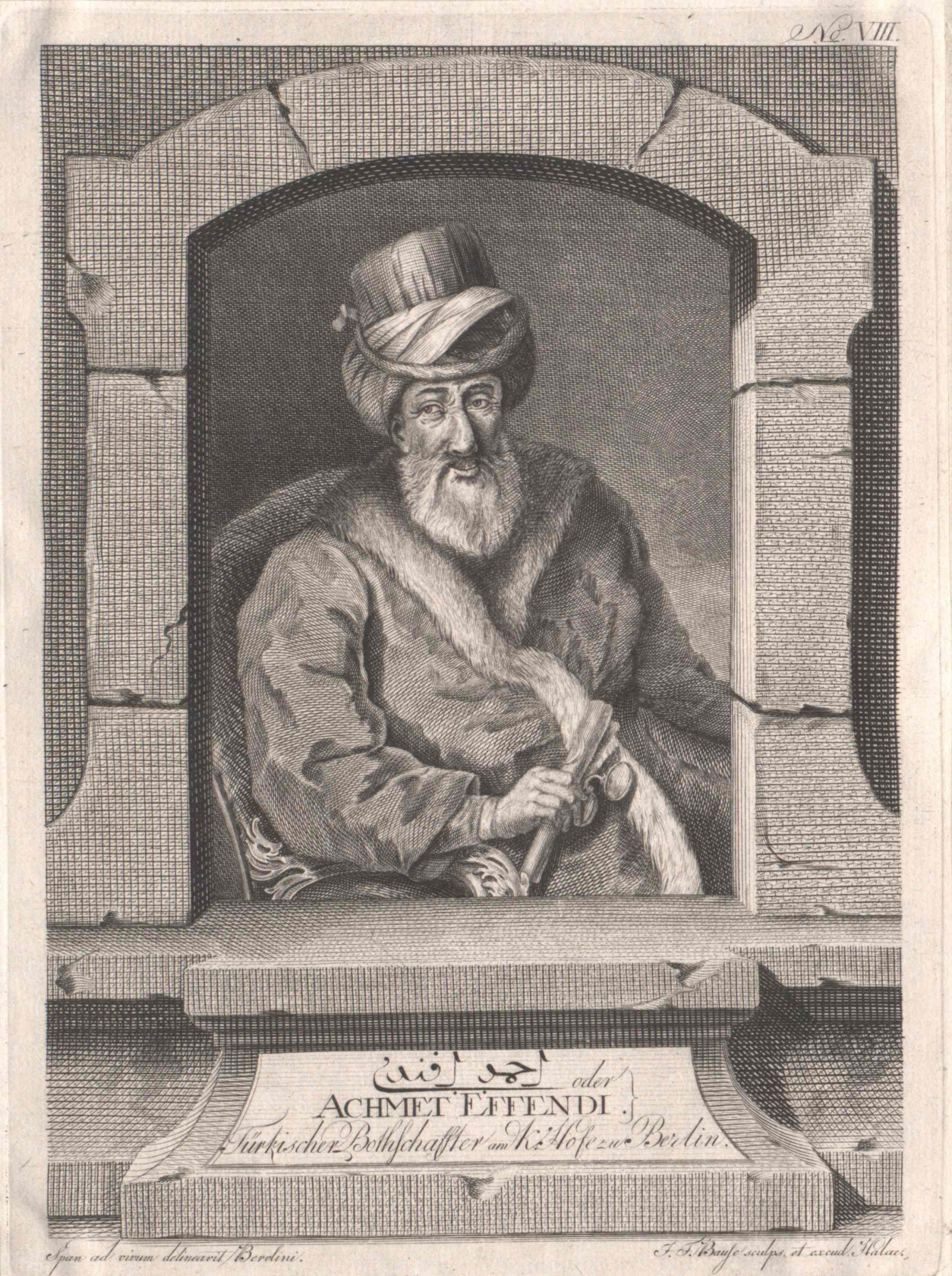
Ahmed Resmî Efendi, chief Ottoman negotiator of the treaty

Russia returned Wallachia and Moldavia to Ottoman control, but was given the right to protect Christians in the Ottoman Empire and to intervene in Wallachia and Moldavia in case of Ottoman misrule. The northwestern part of Moldavia (which became known as Bukovina) was ceded to Austria in 1775. Russia interpreted the Treaty of Kuchuk-Kainarji as giving it the right to protect Orthodox Christians in the Ottoman Empire, notably using this prerogative in the Danubian Principalities (Moldavia and Wallachia) to intervene under the last Phanariote rulers and after the Greek War of Independence. In 1787, faced with increased Russian hostility, Abdul Hamid I declared war on Russia again.

Russia gained Kabardia in the Caucasus, unlimited sovereignty over the port of Azov, the ports of Kerch and Enikale in the Kerch peninsula in the Crimea, and part of the Yedisan region between the Bug and Dnieper rivers at the mouth of the Dnieper. This latter territory included the port of Kherson. Russia thus gained two outlets to the Black Sea, which was no longer an Ottoman lake. Restrictions imposed by the 1739 Treaty of Niš over Russian access to the Sea of Azov and fortifying the area were removed. Russian merchant vessels were to be allowed passage of the Dardanelles. The treaty also granted Eastern Orthodox Christians the right to sail under the Russian flag and provided for the building of a Russian Orthodox Church in Constantinople (which was never built).

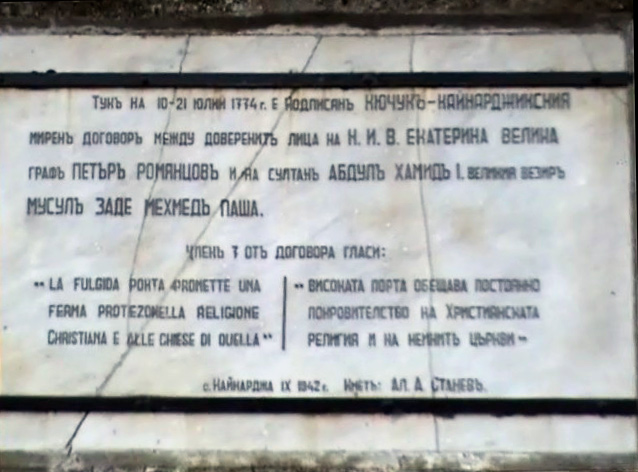
Commemorative plaque at the location where the treaty was signed

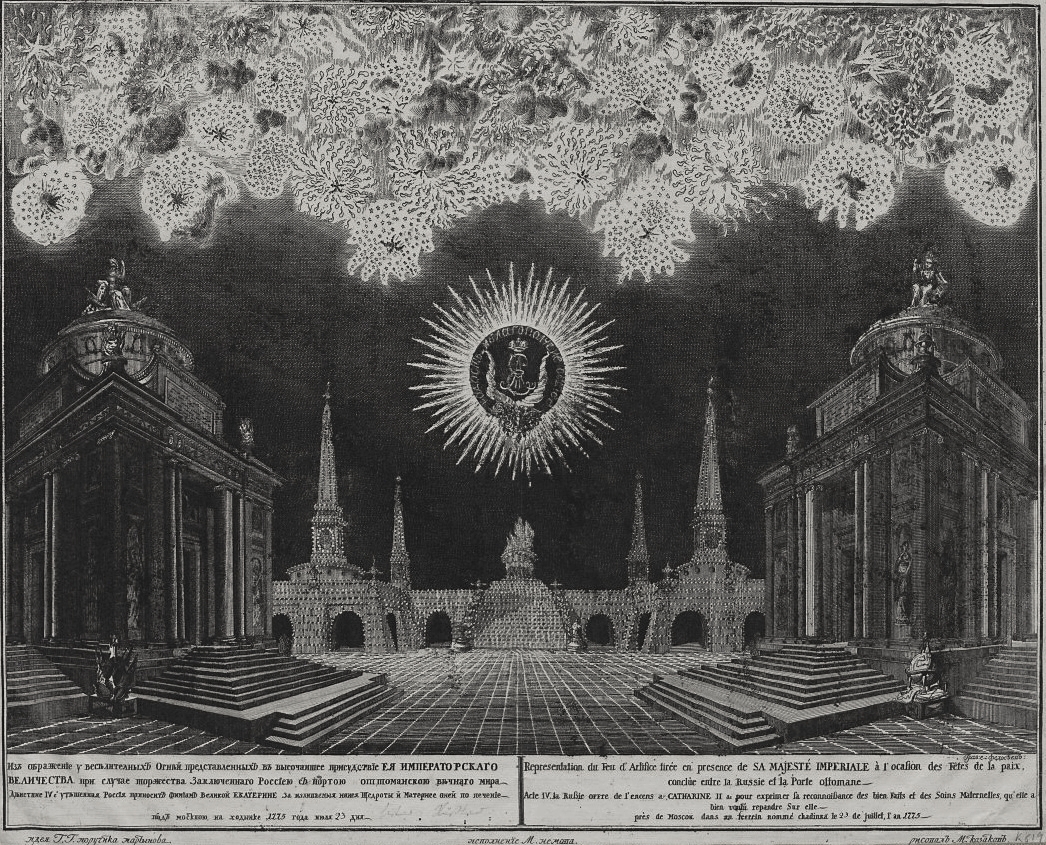
Fireworks at the Khodynka Field near Moscow, a 1775 etching by Yemelyan Alekseevich Fedoseev in the National Museum in Warsaw commemorating celebrations and amusements on the occasion of the signing of the treaty

The Crimean Khanate was the first Muslim territory to slip from the sultan's suzerainty, when the Treaty of Kuchuk-Kainarji forced the Sublime Porte to recognize the Tatars of the Crimea as politically independent, although the sultan remained the religious leader of the Tatars as the Muslim caliph. This was the first time the powers of the Ottoman caliph were exercised outside of Ottoman borders and ratified by a European power. The Khanate retained this nominal independence, while actually being dependent on Russia, until Catherine the Great formally annexed it in 1783, increasing Russia's power in the Black Sea area.

The Ottoman-Russian War of 1768–74 had opened the era of European preoccupation with the Eastern Question: what would happen to the balance of power as the Ottoman Empire lost territory and collapsed? The Treaty of Kuchuk-Kainarji would provide some of the answer. After the Treaty of Karlowitz in 1699, the Ottoman Empire ceased to be an aggressive power; it had terrified Christendom for over 300 years. From then on, it mainly fought against the overwhelming might of Christian Europe. The Habsburgs had been one of the Ottoman Empire's chief European foes, but by the middle of the century, the tsars had taken over the Habsburgs' fight against the Turks. The Russian tsars were seeking the Black Sea, the bulwark of the Ottoman capital of Constantinople. Finally, after two centuries of conflict, the Russian fleet had destroyed the Ottoman navy and the Russian army had inflicted heavy defeats on the Ottoman land forces. The Ottoman Empire's frontiers would gradually shrink for another two centuries, and Russia would proceed to push her frontier westwards to the Dniester.

== Articles ==
Article I – Prescribes a ceasefire. Calls for peace, freedom and amnesty for prisoners, the return home of exiles, and the establishment of "a sincere union, and a perpetual and inviolable friendship".

Article II – Addresses those who have committed capital crimes, stating that these criminals shall not be sheltered in either empire, and should be "delivered up" to the state they belong in.

Article III – Russia and the Ottoman Empire acknowledge all of the Tartar peoples as free and independent nations, with freedom of religion and the freedom to be governed by their own ancient laws. Describes the withdrawal of troops from the lands they have ceded to the Tartars.

Article V – Explains the status of an envoy from the Imperial Court of Russia to the Sublime Porte.

Article VI – Addresses individuals who visit the Sublime Porte in service of the Russian Minister. If that visitor has committed a crime worthy of punishment and becomes Turk for the sake of avoiding the law, all the articles that he has stolen will be returned. Those who wish to become Turk may not do so in a state of intoxication, and even after their fit of drunkenness is over, they must make their final declaration of conversion in front of an interpreter sent by the Russian Minister.

Article VII – The Sublime Porte promises constant protection of the Christian religion and its churches.

Article VIII – Subjects of the Russian Empire have the right to visit Jerusalem and other places deserving of attention in the Ottoman Empire. They will have no obligation to pay any tax or duty, and will be under the strict protection of the law.

Article IX – Interpreters who work for the Russian Ministers work for both Empires, and must be treated with the utmost kindness and respect.

Article X – If any military engagements occur between the signing of the treaty and the dispatch of orders by the military commanders of the two armies, these engagements will have no consequences nor any effect on the treaty.

Article XI – The Sublime Porte will allow the residence of consuls from the Court of Russia to reside in Ottoman territory wherever the Court deems it expedient to establish said consuls. Prescribes free and unimpeded navigation for merchant ships of both countries. Subjects of both Empires may also trade on land.

Article XII – The Sublime Porte promises to use its power and influence to assist the Court of Russia when the court has the intention of making any commercial treaty with the regencies of Africa (Tripoli, Tunis, Algiers, etc.).

Article XIII – Subjects of the Ottoman Empire must evoke the title of the Empress of all the Russias in all public acts and letters. In the Turkish language, that is to say "Temamen Roussielerin Padischag".

Article XIV – Grants permission to the High Court of Russia to build a public church "of the Greek ritual" in Constantinople. The church will always be under the protection of the ministers of the Russian Empire.

Article XV – All cases of disagreement shall be investigated by "the Governors and Commanders of the frontiers". These officials will be bound to render justice where it is due, and any disagreements or disputes in the future will not serve as a pretext for any alteration in the friendship and good-feeling established by the treaty.

Article XVI – The Empire of Russia returns Bessarabia, the fortress of Bender, Wallachia and Moldavia. The Sublime Porte promises to in no way obstruct the free exercise of the Christian religion in these areas, and to grant to families who wish to leave the country a free emigration with all their property. And, from the day the treaty is established, the Sublime Porte will require no taxes of these people for two years. At the expiration of this two-year term, the Sublime Porte promises to treat them with fairness and respect in the taxes they impose.

Article XVII – Russia returns the islands of the Archipelago to the Sublime Porte. In turn, the Sublime Porte promises to observe amnesty of all crimes committed or suspected to have been committed by these people against the interests of the Sublime Porte. The Sublime Porte also promises to not oppress the Christian religion in the area, and to observe the same tax and emigration policies as mentioned in Article XVI.

Article XVIII – The Castle of Kinburn remains under "full, perpetual, and incontestable" dominion of the Empire of Russia.

Article XIX – The fortresses of Jenicale and Kertsch shall remain under "full, perpetual, and incontestable" dominion of the Empire of Russia.

Article XX – The city of Azov shall belong to the Empire of Russia.

Article XXI – The Great Cabarde and Little Carbade, because of their proximity to the Tartars, are more nearly connected with the Khans of Crimea. Thus, it remains with the Khan to consent to these countries becoming subject to the Court of Russia.

Article XXII – The two Empires agree to "annihilate and leave in eternal oblivion" all the treaties and conventions they have made in the past, except the one made in 1700 between Governor Tolstoi and Hassan Bacha, governor of Atschug.

Article XXIII – The fortresses conquered by the Russian armies in Georgia and Mingrelia, Bagdadgick, Kutatis, and Scheherban shall belong to those on whom they were formerly dependent. In turn, the Sublime Porte grants amnesty to those in said countries who offended it in any manner during the course of the war. The Sublime Porte promises to treat this people fairly and grant them freedom of religion, but as they are subjects of the Sublime Porte, Russia must not meddle in their affairs in any way.

Article XXIV – Details plans for a peaceful withdrawal of Russian troops from the lands the Court of Russia has ceded to the Sublime Porte, and a proper turnover of power to Turkish troops. All troops were to be out of said territories within five months of the signing of the "Treaty of Perpetual Peace" between the two empires.

Article XXV – All prisoners of war and slaves in the two Empires shall be granted liberty without ransom money or redemption money. This includes those in the Empire of Russia who voluntarily quit Mahometanism in order to embrace the Christian religion, as well as those in the Ottoman Empire who have left Christianity in order to embrace the Mahometan faith.

Article XXVI – The commander of the Russian Army in Crimea and the Governor of Oczakow must communicate with each other immediately after the signing of the treaty, and within two months after the signing of the treaty, send persons to settle the handing over of the Castle of Kinburn in keeping with the stipulations of Article XXIII.

Article XXVII – In order to keep the peace and friendship between the two Empires authentic, there shall be envoys sent by both sides who will meet on the frontiers and treated with honor and ceremony. As a testimonial of friendship, they shall each bring gifts that will be "proportionate to the dignity of their Imperial Majesties".

Article XXVIII – All hostilities shall cease. Couriers must be dispatched on the part of the Field-Marshal and the Grand Vizier to all the places where hostilities are being carried on. By the power granted to them by their Sovereigns, these couriers shall confirm all the articles put forth by the treaty, and sign them with the seal of their coat-of-arms, with the same force as if they had been drawn up in their presence.

== Major implications ==
Defeat had come this time not at the hands of the Habsburg Empire, one of the most powerful European rulers, but by a remote and once-backward country, which only two generations earlier had itself set out on the course of autocratic Europeanizing reform. The treaty demonstrated that if France and Austria could protect churches of their particular brand of Christianity in Constantinople, Russia could do the same for its own church.

The treaty forced the Ottomans to allow the passage of Russian ships through the Turkish Straits into the Mediterranean past the sultan's palace in Constantinople, avoiding the lengthy detour previously used. The treaty allowed the Ottoman sultan to maintain certain rights there in his capacity as caliph of Muslims. In religious affairs only, the Muslims remained subject to the Ottoman sultan-caliph, which was the first internationally acknowledged assertion of the sultan's rights over Muslims outside the frontiers of his empire. The Crimean Tatars retained the privilege of praying publicly for the sultan that was balanced by the privilege, newly accorded to the tsar, to make representations on behalf of certain of the sultan's Orthodox subjects.

The end of the war marked in earnest the start of the Russo-Circassian war and the slow but eventual Russian expansion and control of the Northern Caucasus culminating in the Circassian Genocide.

Russia's right to build a church in Constantinople later expanded into Russian claims to protect all Orthodox Christians under Ottoman rule. The Ottomans were to pay a large indemnity to the Russians and address the Russian sovereign as padisah, the title reserved for the Ottoman sultan. The treaty acknowledged a religious role for the Ottoman sultan as caliph over Muslims, whom the treaty briefly made 'independent' before they passed under Russian rule. To the extent that the caliphal title later gained importance beyond Ottoman borders, this treaty stimulated the process. However, Ottoman loss of the Crimea and the end of the Crimean khanate caused Muslims everywhere to question the sultan's legitimacy as defenders of Islam (ghazis). Ottoman statesmen recognized that the European menace was not isolated on distant frontiers but threatened the 'heart of Islam' and the 'entire Muslim community'.

The clause relating to the Orthodox Church opened foreign interference in the empire's relations with its Christian subjects. But the defeat also posed a basic problem in statecraft, and threatened the Ottomans' traditional self-confidence, while Russia and Tsarina Catherine would be praised immensely among the Greek Orthodox of Constantinople. The increase in Russia's influence because of the new church paralleled the increase in territorial, commercial, and diplomatic status accorded to Russia by the treaty. The surrender of Muslims to Christian rule put into question the rationale of a state founded on Muslim conquest of Christians, and of a religious revelation that promised to the true believer prosperity and power on earth as well as salvation hereafter. It made abundantly clear the need for reform to save the state and to reassert the true faith; and the only basis of reform could be a Muslim equivalent of Satan casting out Satan. [?]

== Languages ==
Cevdet Pasa reproduced the treaty in his history. His Article 14 states that the church is to be called the dosografa church. The Mu‘āhedāt Mecmū‘ası is the officially-published collection of Ottoman treaties. A copy of the text of the treaty can also be found in Başbakanlık Arşivi in İstanbul and in the series of Ecnebi Defterleri that records treaties, decorations and consular matters.

Texts of the treaty are also found in Italian and Russian. Grand Vizier Muhsinzade Mehmed Pasha signed Turkish and Italian copies of the treaty, and Field Marshal P. A. Rumyantsev signed Russian and Italian texts. Russian, Italian, and Turkish are the only three languages in which original copies of the treaty were written, and in case of a divergence between the Russian and Turkish texts, the Italian text would prevail.

Bernard Lewis suggests that the choice of spelling of Turkish words in the Italian version points to a Russian author.

== Problems in interpretation ==
The treaty has been a continuing source of controversy for statesmen and scholars. The different reproductions of the treaty have led to divergences in the different languages, and thus they have been the source of some confusion. While most of the treaty is straightforward, Articles 7 and 14 have been the source of a variety of interpretations. Article 14 of the treaty concerns the church that is to be built in Constantinople. In the Russian text, Article 14 states that the church would be of the 'Greco-Russian' faith. The Italian text states that the church is to be called 'Russo-Greek'. It is not clear if Russia gained the right to act as a protector of Ottoman Christians through those articles. That question is disputed among historians, as some consider that indeed the treaty gave Russia the right to act as the protector of Christianity within the Ottoman Empire, but others think the opposite or that it was too vague either way.

The Russians were accorded the right to build a church in Constantinople's Galata quarter. The treaty stated that the church would be under the protection of the Russian minister, who could make representations concerning it to the Sublime Porte. In later years, the Russian government would make claims on an even broader right to protect the Greek Orthodox Church and the Greek Orthodox people in the Sultan's domains. Those claims were exaggerated, but the connection seemed logical because of the treaty's provision concerning the church in Constantinople being built. In Cevdet Pasa's history, he makes no mention of the church that in the English text of the treaty is to be "of the Greek ritual", but he rather states that the church was to be called the dosografa church.

If the church was to be called "Russo-Greek", rather than just Greek, it would be more tenable for the Russian government to claim protection of the whole Greek church in the Ottoman Empire.

The Russian draft of the treaty presented to the Turks contained an article identical to Article 14 of the final treaty, which mentioned the right of Russia to construct a church of the "Greco-Russian" faith. The English text erroneously states that the church is to be "of the Greek ritual". The construction of this church was, in fact, a violation of Islamic law because it called for the building of an entirely-new church, not just the replacement of an old one. The Ottoman government had allowed Greek and Latin churches built before 1453 to survive, but no new ones could be built after the conquest of Constantinople. There is a history shown here, not of faulty copying, but of faulty translation of the treaty. Rusogrek was mistakenly copied by a clerk as Rusograf, which was incorrectly copied as 'Dosografa' by Cevdet Pasa or the compiler of the collection of Ottoman treaties. It is unknown exactly who was responsible for the error.

The English translation was made from a French translation of the treaty, which had been made in 1775 in St. Petersburg, and was printed for Parliament in 1854 with the English copy. That Russian-authorized French version of the treaty did not designate the church to be built in Constantinople as "Russo-Greek". Mention of the church's Russian character was omitted. "Of the Greek ritual" may seem to have an insignificant difference from a church "of the Greco-Russian faith", but the mistranslation found in the French and the English texts helped Russian pretensions of a right to protect the wider Greek Church in the Ottoman Empire. It was not in conformity with the Turkish, Russian and Italian texts of the treaty and may or may not have been an innocent mistake, according to Roderic H. Davison. "The St. Petersburg French translation, then, by dropping any reference to the Russian character of the church, and including only reference to the Greek, was misleading. Deliberate or not, it certainly laid an advantageous base for later Russian claims."

Surprisingly, the church was most likely never built; it is never mentioned, even by Russian visitors to Constantinople. Western travellers to Constantinople and residents of Constantinople are also silent on the topic of the construction of such a church.

From the mistranslations and the absence of church construction, Roderic H. Davison concludes that "the 'Dosografa' church of the published Ottoman treaty text is fictitious; the church 'of the Greek ritual' in the French text of St. Petersburg is also erroneous."

== Aftermath ==
In 1853, the Crimean War would break out over Russian assertion of a right to protect Orthodox Christians and the Ottoman denial that there was any such right. Russia tried to extend its right to build a church in Constantinople to intervene in domestic Ottoman affairs under the pretext of protecting the rights of all the Greek Orthodox people in the Ottoman Empire.

== See also ==
- History of the Russo-Turkish Wars
- List of treaties
- Internationalization of the Danube River

== Sources ==
- Bronza, Boro (2010). "The Habsburg Monarchy and the Projects for Division of the Ottoman Balkans, 1771–1788". Empires and Peninsulas: Southeastern Europe between Karlowitz and the Peace of Adrianople, 1699–1829. Berlin: LIT Verlag. pp. 51–62. ISBN 978-3643106117.
- Yücel, Kurtuluş (2019). The Legal Regime of the Turkish Straits: Regulation of the Montreux Convention and its Importance on the International Relations after the Conflict of Ukraine (PDF) (PhD). Johann Wolfgang Goethe-University Frankfurt am Main.
