= Giritli Ali Aziz Efendi =

Ottoman ambassador (1749–1798)

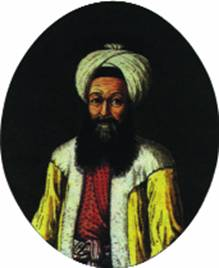
Giritli Ali Aziz Efendi

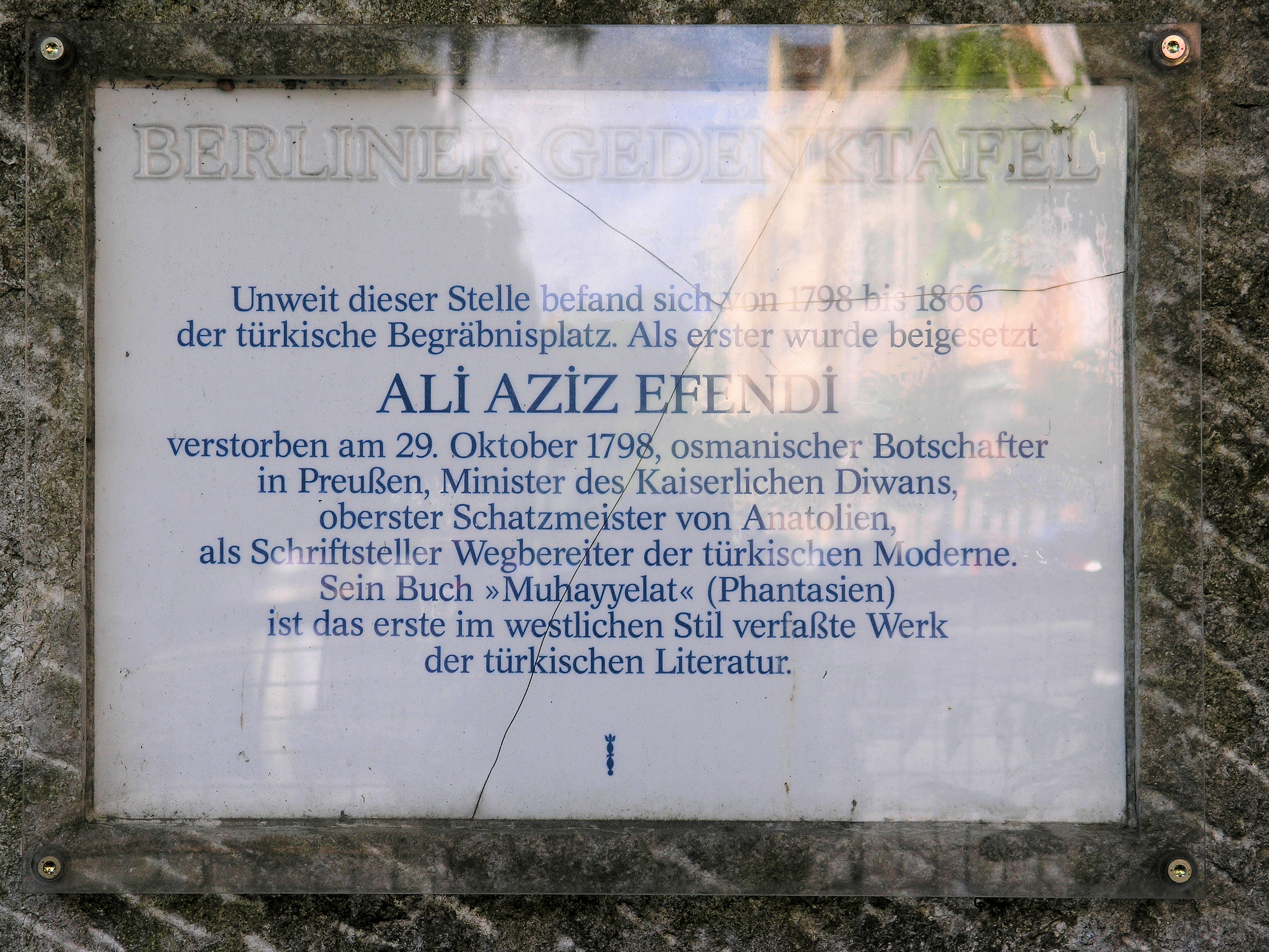
Memorial plaque for Ali Aziz Efendi and the former Turkish cemetery (at this place) in Berlin-Kreuzberg

Giritli Ali Aziz Efendi (1749, in Kandiye (Heraklion) – 29 October 1798, in Berlin) was a late-18th century Ottoman ambassador and author. He is best known for his novel "Muhayyelât" (Imaginations), a unique work of fiction blending personal and fantastic themes, well in the current of the traditional Ottoman prose, but also exhibiting influences from Western literature.

== Biography ==
Ali Aziz Efendi was born in 1749 in Kandiye (Crete) as the son of Tahmisçi Mehmed Efendi, who was the defterdar of the Crete Eyalet. The details on his life are rather sparse and scattered. He rose through the Ottoman hierarchy and was sent as ambassador to Prussia in 1796 and he died in Berlin in 1798. His burial marked also the opening of the first Turkish or Muslim cemetery in Berlin. His writings combined Ottoman traditions, mystical ideas, and imagination, influencing the development of modern Turkish literature.

== Muhayyelât ==
Consisting in three parts and written in a laconical style contrasting with its content, where djinns and fairies surge from within contexts drawn from ordinary real life situations, Ali Aziz Efendi often pursues by pulling the reader towards description of magic and to extraordinary occurrences. Inspired by a much older story written both in Arabic and Assyrian, the author also displays in his work his deep knowledge of sufism, hurufism and Bektashi traditions. Muhayyelât is considered to be an early precursor of the new Turkish literature to emerge in the Tanzimat period of the 19th century. It also influenced Tanzimat literature directly when the manuscript was printed in 1867 and became a very popular book of the time. His work is re-discovered by Turkey's reading public rather recently and is increasingly admitted as a classic.

Ali Aziz Efendi also wrote further and shorter works of prose, which present as complementary extensions to Muhayyelât, as well as some poetry, and kept a correspondence with a number of notable figures of his time, both Ottoman and Western.

He is also cited for a short sefâretnâme he wrote relating his introduction to his mission as the ambassador of the Ottoman Empire in Prussia.

== Works ==
- Muhayyelât (Imaginations), 312p., ISBN 975-6295-42-2

== See also ==
- Ahmed Resmî Efendi
- Sefâretnâme
- Cretan Turks
