= Muhib Efendi =

Ottoman diplomat

Muhib Efendi was an Ottoman Empire ambassador to the court of Napoleon I in Paris in the early 19th century, between 1806 and 1811.

In February 1806, following Napoleon's remarkable victory in the Battle of Austerlitz in December 1805 and the ensuing dismemberment of the Habsburg Empire, the Ottoman Emperor Selim III refused to ratify the Russian and British alliances, and instead recognized Napoleon as Emperor, formally opting for an alliance with France "our sincere and natural ally", and war with Russia and England.

Muhib Efendi was sent to Paris as ambassador (1806–1811), thus succeeding to Halet Efendi in this role. The presence of Muhib Efendi in Paris coincided with that of the Persian ambassador Askar Khan Afshar, who was in Paris from July 1808 to April 1810.

Selim III's decisions in favour of France triggered the 1806 Russo-Turkish War and the 1807 Anglo-Turkish War.
