= Köse Bahir Mustafa Pasha =

Grand Vizier of the Ottoman Empire (1752–1755, 1756, 1763–65)

Bahir Mustafa Pasha

Grand Vizier of the Ottoman Empire
- In office 12 July 1752 – 17 February 1755
- Monarchs: Mahmud I Osman III
- Preceded by: Divittar Mehmet Pasha
- Succeeded by: Hekimoğlu Ali Pasha
- In office 1 April 1756 – 3 December 1756
- Monarch: Osman III
- Preceded by: Yirmisekizzade Mehmet Sait Pasha
- Succeeded by: Koca Ragıp Pasha
- In office 1 November 1763 – 30 March 1765
- Monarch: Mustafa III
- Preceded by: Tevkii Hamza Hamit Pasha
- Succeeded by: Muhsinzade Mehmet Pasha

Personal details
- Died: 1765 Lesbos, Ottoman Empire
- Profession: Civil servant

Köse Bahir Mustafa Pasha was an Ottoman-Turk statesman who served as grand vizier three times. His epithet Köse means "beardless". He was also known as Çorlulu Bahir Mustafa Pasha referring to his hometown Çorlu. Before being grand vizier he was an imrahor ("governor of the royal stables").

== First term ==
He was appointed as the grand vizier by the sultan Mahmut I on 1 July 1752. But the Sultan died on 14 December 1754. The new sultan Osman III dismissed Köse Bahir Mustafa Pasha from the post on 17 February 1755. He was exiled to Midilli (Lesbos, now a Greek island). Later he was moved to Morea (now in Greece).

== Second term ==
His second term as the grand vizier was quite short. He was appointed on 30 April 1756 and was dismissed on 3 December 1756. He was exiled to Rhodes (now a Greek island), but the new grand vizier Koca Ragıp Pasha was a friend of Köse Bahir Pasha and helped him to be appointed to various posts in Midilli and Eğriboz (Euboea, now a Greek island). On 11 June 1758 he was appointed as the governor of Egypt, a seat he kept till 1762. Although he was appointed to the governorship of Aleppo (now in Syria) he refused to go to Aleppo.

== Third term ==
His last term as the grand vizier began on 1 November 1763 during the reign of Mustafa III. However he was accused of corruption. He was dismissed on 30 March 1765. The next month he was executed in Midilli.
