= Abbas Wasim Efendi =

Ottoman astronomer (1689–1760)

- Born: 1689; Bursa, Ottoman Empire
- Died: 1760 (aged 70–71); Istanbul, Ottoman Empire
- Scientific career
- Fields: Astronomy

ʿAbbās Wasīm Efendi (1689–1760) was an Ottoman astronomer who wrote translations and commentaries used by astronomers and timekeepers of the Ottoman state. His most important work is a Turkish commentary on Ulugh Beg's Zij. He was born in Bursa, Turkey and died in Istanbul. He traveled extensively in search of knowledge, visiting Damascus, Egypt, Mecca, and Medina. After returning to Istanbul, he opened a clinic and pharmacy and treated patients for about 40 years. In addition, he wrote and translated many works on medicine and pharmacology that included the latest achievements of European science. He received his education from Bursalı Ali and Ömer Şifai Efendi. His grave is located in a cemetery outside Edirnekapı. Abbas Vesim Efendi is a scientist who has made significant contributions in both medicine and astronomy.
