= Lalla Rookh (1876 ship) =

Iron barque built in 1876

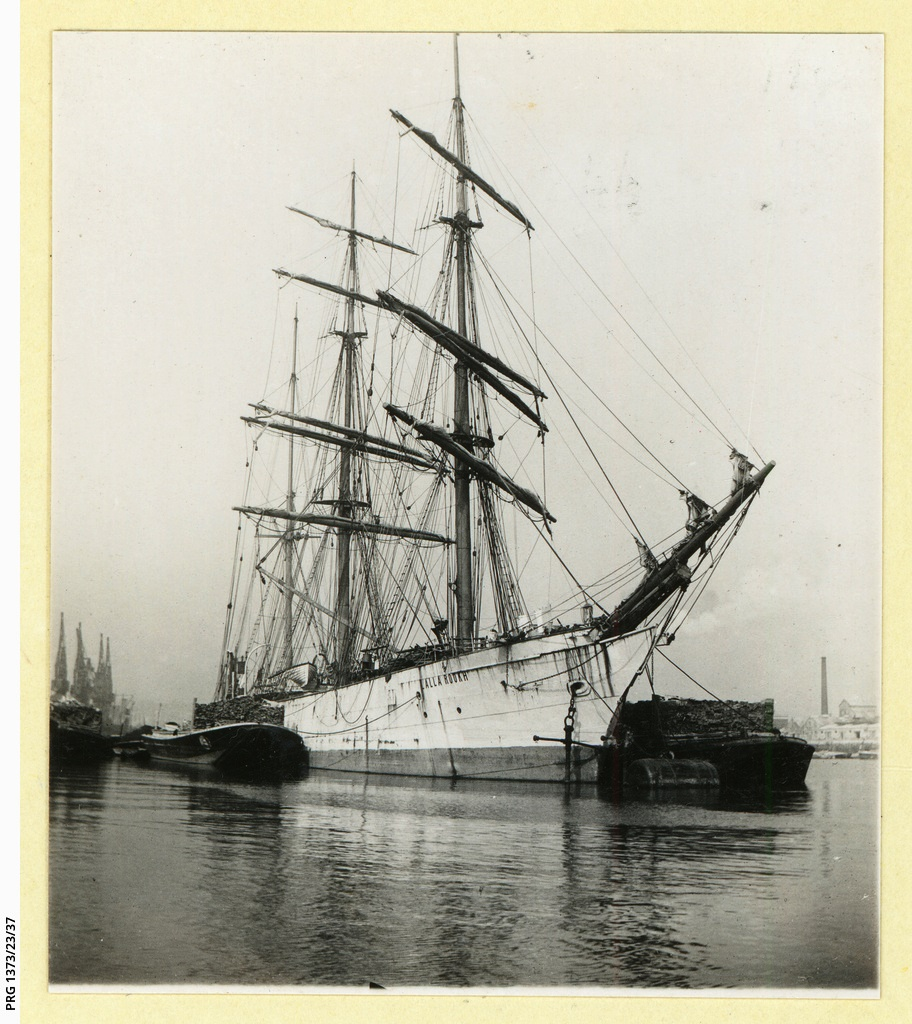
- Lalla Rookh in an unknown port

History

United Kingdom, Norway, Finland
- Name: Lalla Rookh (1876–1904); Effendi (1904 or 1916–1923); Karhu (1923–1926); Lalla Rookh (1926–1928
- Owner: E. C. Friend and Co. (1876–c.1898); many others
- Builder: R & J Evans and Co., Liverpool
- Launched: 1876
- Fate: Broken up in Bruges, 1928

General characteristics
- Class & type: Barque
- Tonnage: 841 GRT, 814 NRT, 1,350 DWT
- Length: 196 feet (60 m)

Lalla Rookh was an iron three-masted barque, 841 tons, built in 1876 by R & J Evans and Co. in Liverpool and originally owned by E. C. Friend and Co. In 1905 she was sold to Norwegian owners, and in 1916 her name was changed to Effendi. From March 1923 or 1924 she was based in Finland, renamed Karhu, before reverting to her original name in 1926. She was broken up in Bruges, Belgium, in 1928.

She voyaged across the Pacific, to ports in Australasia, and also across the Atlantic Ocean to North and South America.

== History ==
The iron three-masted barque built in 1876 by R & J Evans and Co., and owned by E. C. Friend and Co. Her dimensions were 196 feet (60 m) by 32 feet (9.8 m) by 20 feet (6.1 m), and tonnage 814 GRT, 814 NRT, and 1350 DWT.

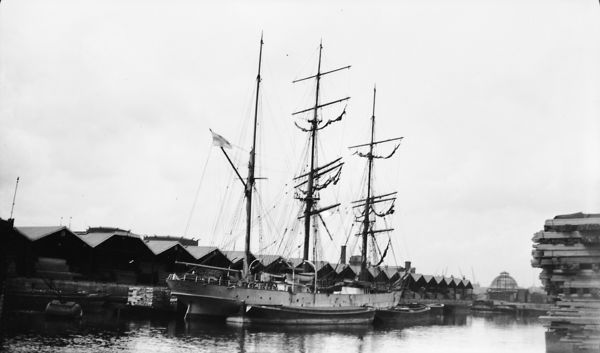
Lalla Rookh in Surrey Commercial Docks, c.1900.

The ship was sold c.1898 to the Newark Shipping Co. (Nicholson & Co.) and again c.1904 to Lever Bros., for use in the copra trade in the South Pacific.

Sometime after March 1905 she was sold to O.T. Tørnevold, of Grimstad, Norway.

She was based in Grimstad until 1915, then sold to Joh. S. Olsen in Kristiansand for 1915 for 54,000 kroner, until 1916, when she was bought by Storm-Bull Ltd. in Kristiania for 1916 for 275,000 kroner. Her name was changed to Effendi in late 1916.

In 1919 she was sold to H.T. Realfsen, of Skien (with one source recording a name change to Belona, but unconfirmed by others) and two years later was laid up in Skien. In March 1923 (or 1924), after being sold to the Finnish Verner Hacklin, she became Karhu.

In February 1926 she was sold to Gustav Erikson in Mariehamn, reverted to her original name, and sailed under the command of captains Isidor Eriksson and K. V. Karlsson.

In late 1928 she was broken up in Bruges.

== Captains and voyages ==
In 1886 she sailed under the command of Captain R. Kinnear.

In August 1897, Lalla Rookh put into Port Jackson, New South Wales, in distress, on a voyage from Calcutta, India, to Antofagasta in Chile, after being damaged in a hurricane south of the equator. She was taken to Mort's Dock for repairs. It was reported that it would take some time to repair and refit the British ship.

On 21 March 1905, under the command of Captain Crawley, she sailed from Brisbane to Falmouth, Cornwall, in 199 days.

Her captains while in Norway included A. S. Flørenæss (1905–1914), T. S. Bendixen (1914–1915), Saanum (1915–) and G. T. Jochumsen (–1916).

In 1906/1907 she sailed from Tahiti to Liverpool in 98 days.

Norwegian ship records show journeys from "Launceton, New Zealand" (Launceston, Tasmania?) to the Marquesas Islands in 36 days, from Cardiff to "Pto. Cagello" (Puerto Cabello, Venezuela?) in 42 days in 1907, and from London to Hobart in 95 days, and in 1915, from Halifax, Nova Scotia, to Garston (Liverpool) in 15 days.
