= Koca Ragıp Pasha =

Grand Vizier of the Ottoman Empire from 1757 to 1763

Koca Damat Mehmet Ragıp Pasha
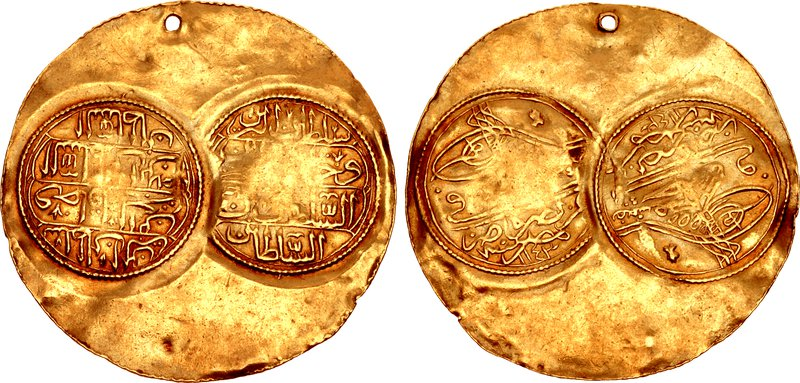
- Coin used by Koca Ragıp Pasha as governor of Egypt. Minted in Cairo, dated 1730. Arabic inscriptions on both sides. Obv: "Sultan of the two lands and Khaqan of the two seas, the Sultan, Raghib, son of the Sultan". Rev: "Struck Misr [Cairo] in 1143 may his victory be glorious"

Grand Vizier of the Ottoman Empire
- In office 12 January 1757 – 8 April 1763
- Monarchs: Osman III; Mustafa III
- Preceded by: Köse Bahir Mustafa Pasha
- Succeeded by: Tevkii Hamza Hamid Pasha

Ottoman Governor of Egypt
- In office 1744–1748
- Preceded by: Yedekçi Mehmet Pasha
- Succeeded by: Yeğen Ali Pasha

Personal details
- Born: 1698 Constantinople, Ottoman Empire
- Died: 8 April 1763 (aged 64–65) Constantinople, Ottoman Empire
- Spouse: Saliha Sultan (m. 1758)
- Profession: Civil servant

Koca Damat Mehmet Ragıp Pasha (1698–1763) was an Ottoman statesman who served as a civil servant before 1744 as the provincial governor of Egypt from 1744 to 1748 and Grand Vizier from 1757 to 1763. He was also known as a poet. His epithet Koca means "great" or "giant" in Turkish.

== Early years ==
His father was Şevki Mustafa, a bureaucrat in the Ottoman Empire. After completing his education, Mehmet Ragıp worked in various parts of the empire as a civil servant. He served as the chief treasurer in Baghdad (then a part of the Ottoman Empire). He was a member of Ottoman representatives in the Treaty of Belgrade in 1739. He was promoted to the post of reis ül-küttab (equivalent to a modern foreign minister) in 1740. He was the governor of Ottoman Egypt from 1744 to 1748, when he was forced to step down by local troops.

== As Grand Vizier ==
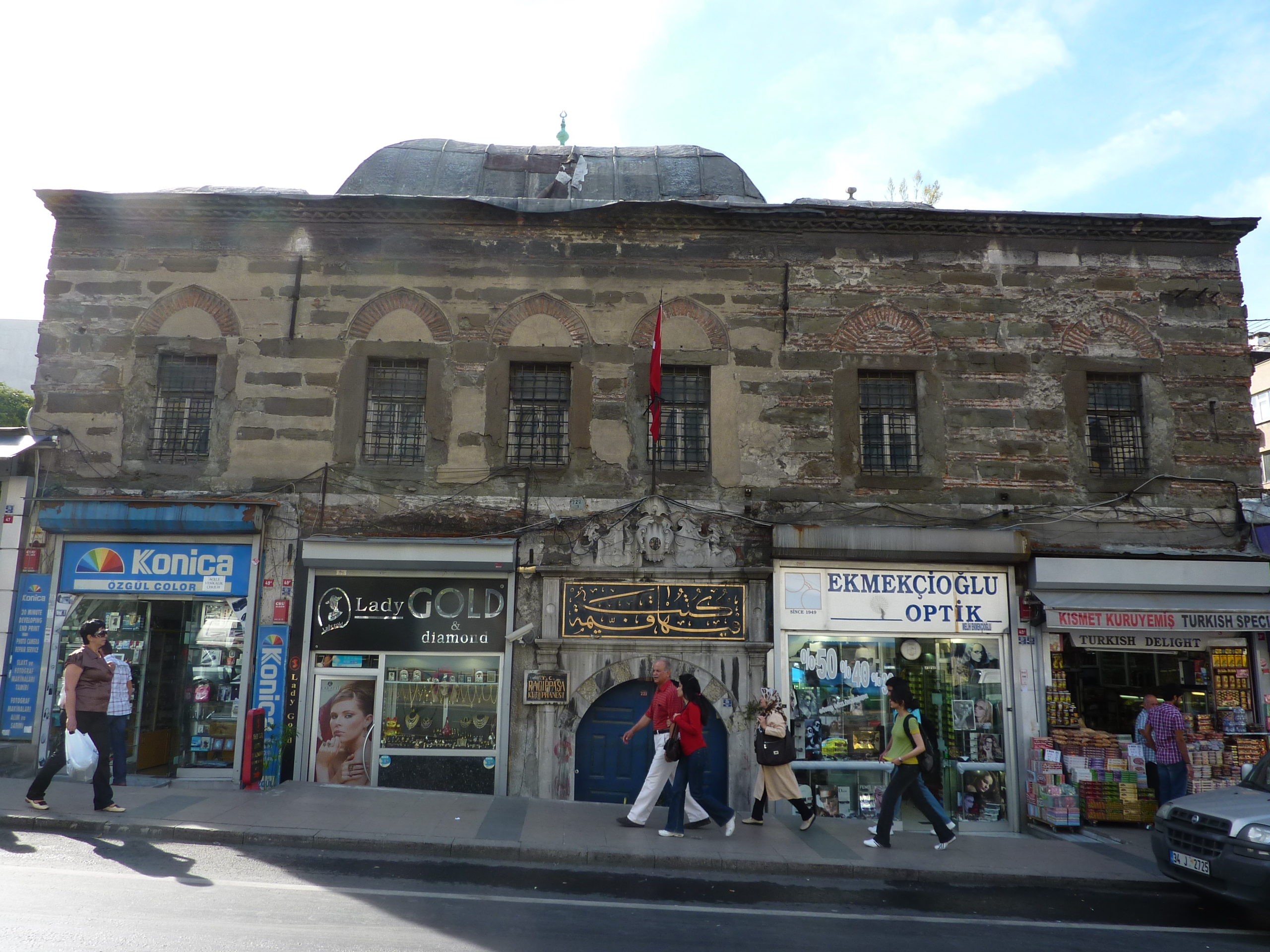
Ragıp Paşa Library, Istanbul

He was appointed as Grand Vizier on 12 January 1757 by the sultan Osman III. When Osman III died ten months later, Mehmet Ragıp Pasha continued under the new sultan Mustafa III with whom he had very good relations. He married Saliha, the sultan's sister, and gained the title damat (English: bridegroom).

Ragıp's term was during an Ottoman decline. He nevertheless enacted reforms to Ottoman administration and treasury. For the first time Ottoman revenues exceeded expenditures. He was an adherent of peace policy. His term in the office almost coincides with the Seven Years' War in Europe (1756-1763). Despite the danger of war, he was able to keep the Ottoman Empire out of conflict. Upon his death, Mustafa III wrote an elegy (Turkish: ağıt) expressing his sorrow for his good friend.

== See also ==
- List of Ottoman grand viziers
- List of Ottoman governors of Egypt

Political offices
Preceded by Yedekçi Mehmet Pasha	Ottoman Governor of Egypt; 1744–1748	Succeeded by Yeğen Ali Pasha
Preceded by Köse Bahir Mustafa Pasha	Grand Vizier of the Ottoman Empire; 12 January 1757 – 8 April 1763	Succeeded by Tevkii Hamza Hamid Pasha
