= Orta (janissary) =

The Orta is the main military division of the janissary odjak, which initially under the reign of Sultan Murad I numbered 1,000 new soldiers divided into 10 Ortas.

At the end of the reign of Sultan Murad II, the number of ortas reached 100. Initially, until the formation of the corps structure, the ortas were commanded by the yayabashi. The first janissary squads received the collective name jamaat (community) and laid the foundation for the janissary corps.

At the time of Suleiman I the Magnificent, the janissary corps numbered 13,000 new warriors. At the end of the 17th century, the number of janissaries exceeded 70,000. Already at the beginning of the 16th century, the janissary odjak united 196 ortas, of which 101 were from the jamaat subdivision, 34 from sekban and 61 were bölük. The Acemi oğlan fire brigade, which is not a combat unit, but a training school for future janissaries, is also included in the corps. At the head of the janissary corps is the janissary agha who depends directly on the Ottoman sultan and is his confidant. His military position is second only to that of Beylerbey.

In this way, the Orta became the main combat and organizational unit of the janissary corps. Each Orta has a separate barracks, and during campaigns and battles its soldiers gather in a separate tent. The orta is commanded by an officer called a chorbadji.

At first, the janissary corps was only an infantry force, but in the 15th century, the separation of other types of troops began as well — artillery divisions and court cavalry, called Kapıkulu Süvarileri ("Household Slave Cavalry") — Six Divisions of Cavalry. In times of peace and war, they provide the Sultan's personal security. In battles, they guard the wings of the janissary infantry.

== See also ==
- Orta Mosque, Veria
