= Orta Mosque, Veria =

Former mosque in Veria, Central Macedonia, Greece

Orta Mosque
- Ορτά Τζαμί
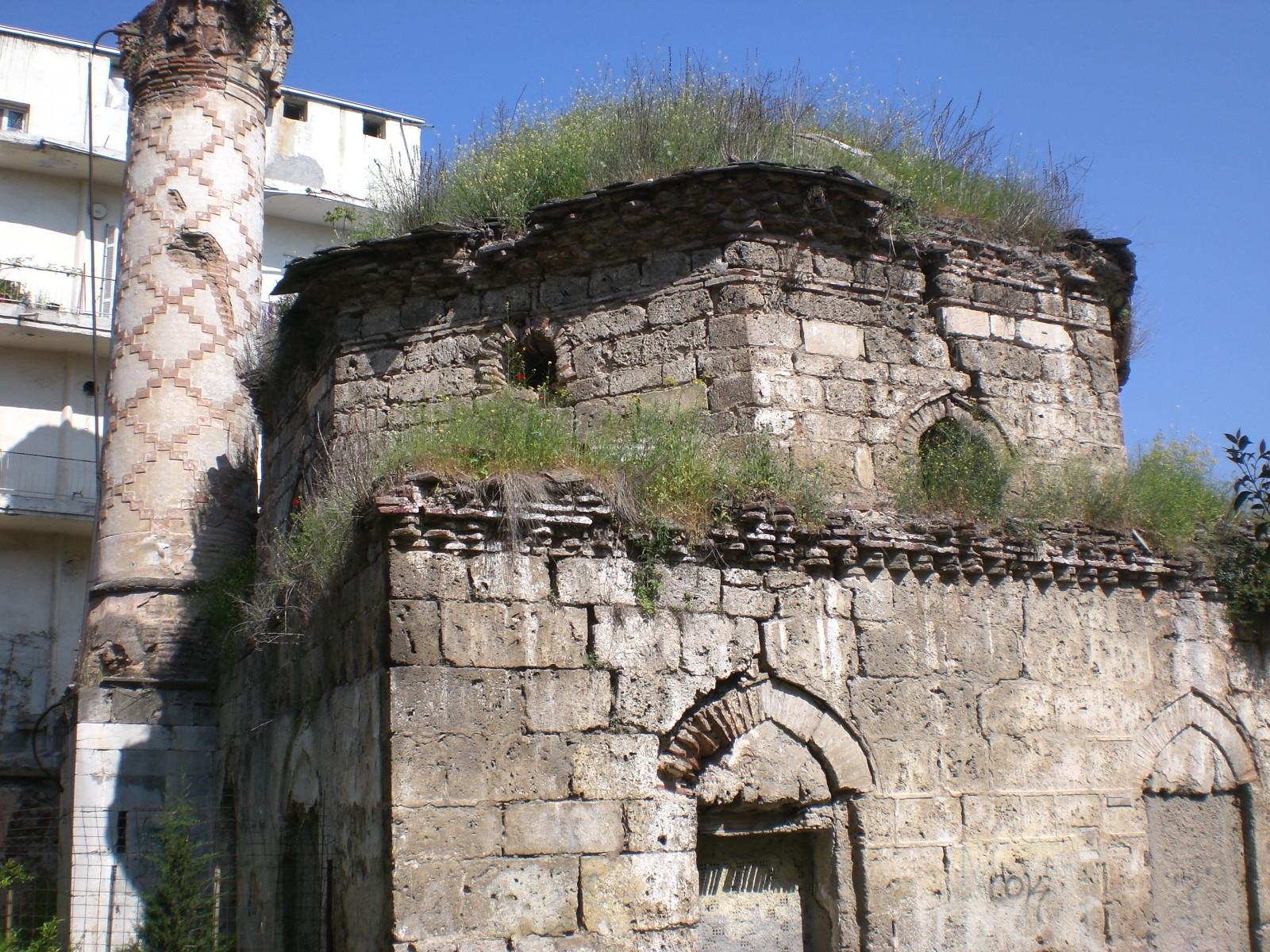

- Location of the former mosque in Greece

Religion
- Affiliation: Islam (former)
- Ecclesiastical or organizational status: Mosque (c. 1490–1912)
- Status: Abandoned (as a mosque); Repurposed

Location
- Location: Veria, Central Macedonia
- Country: Greece
- Interactive map of Orta Mosque
- Coordinates: 40°31′17″N 22°12′03″E

Architecture
- Type: Mosque
- Style: Ottoman
- Completed: 1490

Specifications
- Length: 8 m (26 ft)
- Width: 8 m (26 ft)
- Dome: 1
- Minarets: 1 (destroyed, 1973)
- Materials: Brick; limestone; marble

The Orta Mosque (Greek: Ορτά Τζαμί, from the Turkish: Orta Camii, lit. 'Middle Mosque') is a former mosque in the city of Veria, in the Central Macedonia region of northern Greece. Completed in 1490 during the Ottoman era, the mosque was abandoned in 1912, following the Balkan Wars, and was subsequently repurposed for profane use.

== Overview ==
Built in 1490, the mosque is "one of the most notable specimens of Ottoman architecture" in the city. As its Turkish name indicates, it is in the centre of the city, between the Kentriki, Leonidou and Themistokleous streets. It is a plain, square structure, measuring 8 metres (26 ft) on each side, housing a single large hall and topped by a dome, once sheathed in lead, supported by an octagonal drum. The entrance formerly featured an impressive portico with four marble pillars supporting four small arches, of which only a ruined portion survives. The walls are built of large limestone blocks, but heavy use has also been made of marble spolia from neo-classical and Byzantine buildings; among the identifiable fragments are inscriptions in honour of Lucius Calpurnius Piso and emperor Nerva, from the local Temple of the Sebastoi.

The grouting of the building's external walls is used in decorative manner, protruding from the masonry. The minaret features a particularly striking decoration resembling lattice work. Wooden buildings were formerly joined to the building, as old photos and traces in the northeastern and southwestern corners attest. The mosque was declared a preserved monument in 1938, but has variously been used as a house, a musical instruments workshop, and a stonemason's workshop.

== See also ==
- Islam in Greece
- List of former mosques in Greece
- Ottoman Greece
