= Salih Efendi =

Albanian religious scholar

- Title: Hekimbaşı (Chief Physician)

Personal life
- Born: 1827 Istanbul, Ottoman Empire (now Turkey)
- Died: 1895 (aged 67–68) Istanbul, Ottoman Empire
- Occupation: Chief Physician, Islamic scholar, educator

Salih Efendi the Elder was a prominent citizen of Shkodër in the 19th century.

== Biography ==
Originally from near Ndocej neighborhood of Skadarska Krajina, he was spiritually educated in Istanbul starting in 1831. Renowned among the Istanbul ulema, he was recruited by Mustafa Pasha Bushatli to teach at the Qafe-Thana Madrasa in Shkodër, where his notable students included Isuf Tabaku, Hasan Efendi Podgorica, and Ahmet Efendi Kalaja.

On 22 October 1856 Salih Efendi the Elder, Salih Efendi the Younger, Kalaja, Hysen Begu, Hamza bey Kazazi, brothers Hasan Aga and Osman Aga Hoti, and Halil Spahi Podgorica were all apprehended by cavalry and deported to Istanbul to punish them for obstructing the operations of the Albanian Pontifical Seminary.

Salih died in Shkodër in 1866 and was buried in the local Ndocej Mosque.
