= Tunca Bridge =

Bridge in Edirne, Turkey

Tunca Bridge Tunca Köprüsü (Ekmekçizade Ahmet Paşa Köprüsü)
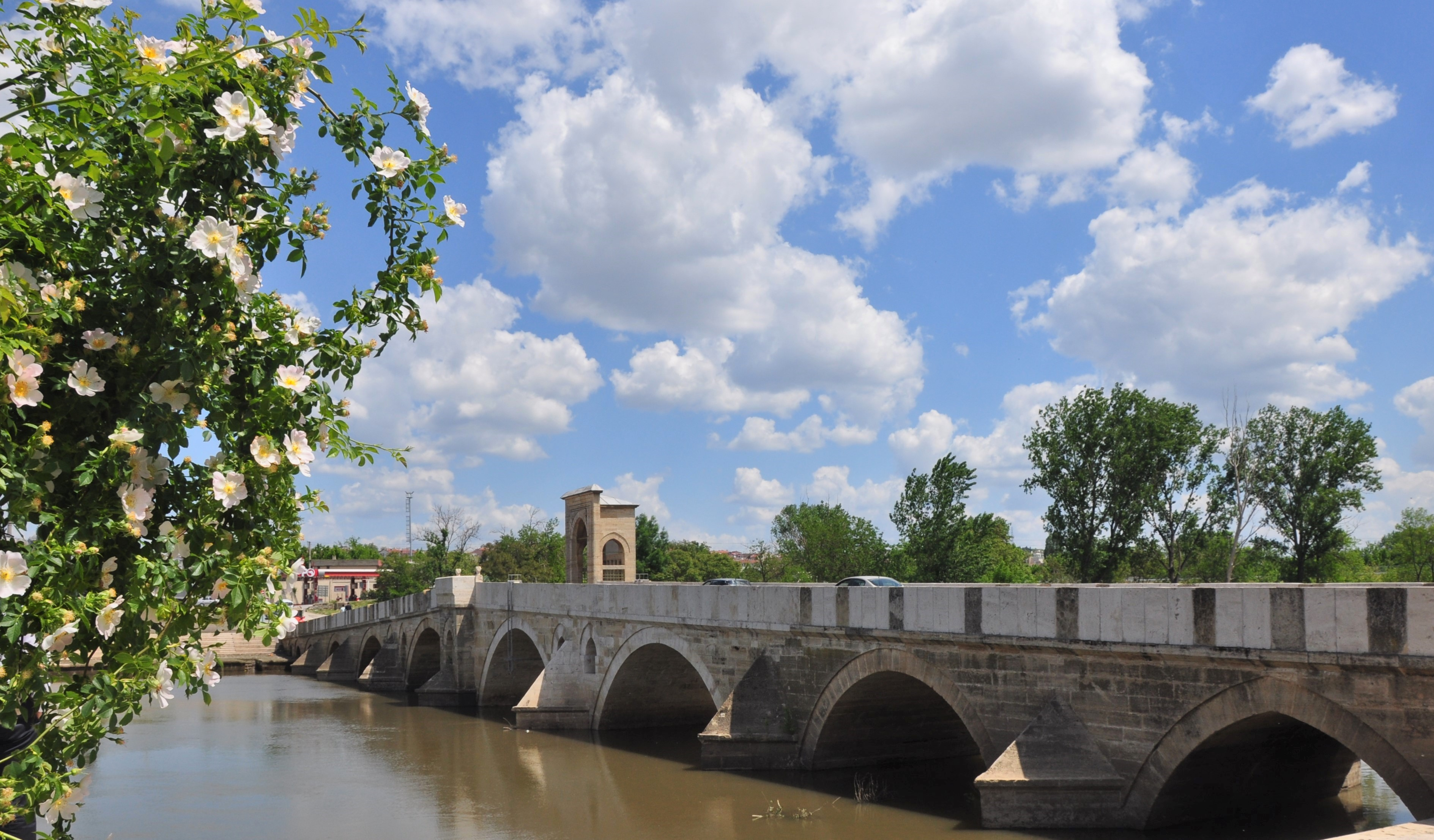
- Tunca bridge
- Coordinates: 41°40′04″N 26°33′15″E
- Crosses: Tundzha
- Locale: Edirne
- Named for: Tundzha (Tunca) River
- Owner: General Directorate of Highways

Characteristics
- Total length: 136.30 m (447.2 ft)
- Width: 6.90 m (22.6 ft)

History
- Constructed by: Ekmekçizade Ahmet Pasha
- Construction start: 1608
- Construction end: 1615

Location
- Interactive map of Tunca Bridge

Tunca Bridge (Turkish: Tunca Köprüsü, a.k.a. Ekmekçizade Ahmet Paşa Köprüsü) is a historic bridge in Edirne, Turkey.

It is on the road connecting Edirne to Karaağaç and spans over the Tundzha River just to the north of the intersection point of Tunca and Meriç Rivers.

It was commissioned by Ekmekcioğlu Ahmed Pasha who was a defterdar of the Ottoman Empire between 1606 and 1613. Its architect was probably Sedefkar Mehmet Aga who was also the architect of Sultan Ahmed Mosque in Istanbul. Its construction period was between 1608 and 1615. It is an arch bridge with 11 abutments and 10 arches. There is also a small tower in the midpoint. The length of the bridge is 136.30 metres (447.2 ft) and the width is 6.90 metres (22.6 ft).

Although a part of the bridge including the small tower had been damaged during the frequent floods, in 2008 it was restored.
