= Iskender Pasha =

Iskender Pasha (Turkish: Iskender Paşa; Ottoman Turkish: اسکندر پاشا) may refer to:

- Iskender Pasha (governor of Ozi) (fl. 1620), Ottoman governor of Ozi
- Iskender Pasha (governor of Egypt) (fl. 1555–1559), Ottoman governor of Egypt (1556–59)
- Mihaloğlu Iskender Pasha (fl. 1478–1504), or Skender Pasha, Ottoman governor of Bosnia
- Iskender Pasha (1814–1861), born Antoni Aleksander Iliński, Polish-Ottoman officer
