= Maktul Hacı Ibrahim Pasha =

Ottoman statesman

Ibrahim Pasha (Note: Also known as Hacı Ibrahim Pasha, Maktul Ibrahim Pasha and among his Arab subjects, as Ibrahim Pasha al-Maqtul, Maktul meaning "the Slain") (died 24 September 1604) was an Ottoman statesman who served shortly as the governor of Egypt in 1604 before he was murdered by mutinying Sipahi soldiers of the Ottoman Army. He also served as defterdar (finance minister) of the Ottoman Empire four times (1582–83, 1587–88, 1593–94, 1596).

== Background ==
Ibrahim Pasha appears to have lived in Konya in his early life and been a dervish and a follower of the ascetic Muslim mystic Rumi. As such, he was sometimes known by the epithet "Sufi" by historians. He was also a kadı (judge) at some point in his life prior to becoming the four-time defterdar of the empire and governor of Egypt.

== Tenure as the governor of Egypt ==
In 1604, sultan Ahmed I appointed Ibrahim Pasha as the governor of Egypt, Egypt then being the seat of the Egypt Eyalet of the Ottoman Empire. His office's title was beylerbey, while governors of a province in general was referred to as a wāli.

Since the Ottoman conquest of Egypt and their subjugation in 1517, Mamluks in Egypt had been silently pushing for more influence in Egypt; they often attempted this by trying to influence the garrisoned Ottoman soldiers over the Ottoman governor. After Ibrahim Pasha was appointed governor in 1604, he began to enforce more stringent rules for the soldiers, especially those from the sipahi corps (an elite cavalry corps of the Ottoman Army), putting some of them to death. Allegedly, Ibrahim Pasha had one such soldier from the fellah (Arabic-speaking) class of the local Mamluk populace put to death by hanging and had his body draped in a sirwal (Arabic baggy trousers), which was something both the local sepahis and the Mamluks wore, in order to send a message of his distaste for both groups; furthermore, the body was then allegedly placed in a jar to symbolize the slave class the two groups belonged to.

Another source states that tensions rose when Ibrahim Pasha refused to pay a briberous "accession tax" to the local sepahis for coming into the office of the governor of Egypt. Sipahis, in further corruption, self-enacted an illegal tax known as the tulba on the people of the Egyptian countryside, claiming that the tax was for "facilitating police duties." When Ibrahim Pasha cracked down on this practice and refused to buy into the system, tensions between Ibrahim Pasha, the sipahis, the Mamluks, and the general army grew to enormous levels.

== Murder ==
Tensions came to a head on 24 September 1604, only a few months after Ibrahim Pasha had assumed office. The pasha, along with many armed companions, left the governor's citadel in Cairo in order to open a dyke or a waterwheel in either the Shubra or the Bulaq district of the city. Around this time, a number of soldiers in his army gathered at the City of the Dead necropolis and took an oath on the saints' tombs to assassinate the pasha.

Although warned of the rebels' intentions, Ibrahim Pasha refused to move away or escape from the project to which he was attending. In the presence of several beys and military officials standing by, 15 rebel cavalry soldiers approached Ibrahim Pasha and killed him with their swords. Ibrahim Pasha thus became the first governor of the Ottoman Empire to be killed by his own troops, earning the posthumous epithet Maktul, meaning "the Slain".

After murdering the pasha, the rebel soldiers displayed his and some of his men's heads publicly, parading them through the streets and then placing them on the gate of Bab Zuweila, where criminals' remains were normally displayed, allegedly crying, "This is due to [deserved by] those who cause strife in the Sultan's army." The chief kadı (judge) in the eyalet became acting governor until the sultan could appoint a new one.

== Legacy ==
Ibrahim Pasha's death caused a period of instability and distress in Egypt, and stability was only restored around 7 or 8 years later when the governor Kara Mehmed Pasha finally crushed the rebellion, earning his epithet Kul Kıran ("the Slavebreaker").

== See also ==
- List of Ottoman governors of Egypt
- List of Ottoman ministers of finance

== Notes ==
Political offices
Preceded by Okçuzade Mehmed Pasha	Defterdar; 1582–1583	Succeeded by
Preceded by	Defterdar; 1587–1588	Succeeded by
Preceded by Emir Mehmed Pasha	Defterdar; 1593–94	Succeeded by
Preceded by	Defterdar; 1596	Succeeded by
Preceded by Yavuz Ali Pasha	Ottoman Governor of Egypt; 1604	Succeeded by Hadım Mehmed Pasha
