= List of Ottoman governors of Egypt =

Governor of Egypt of the Ottoman Empire
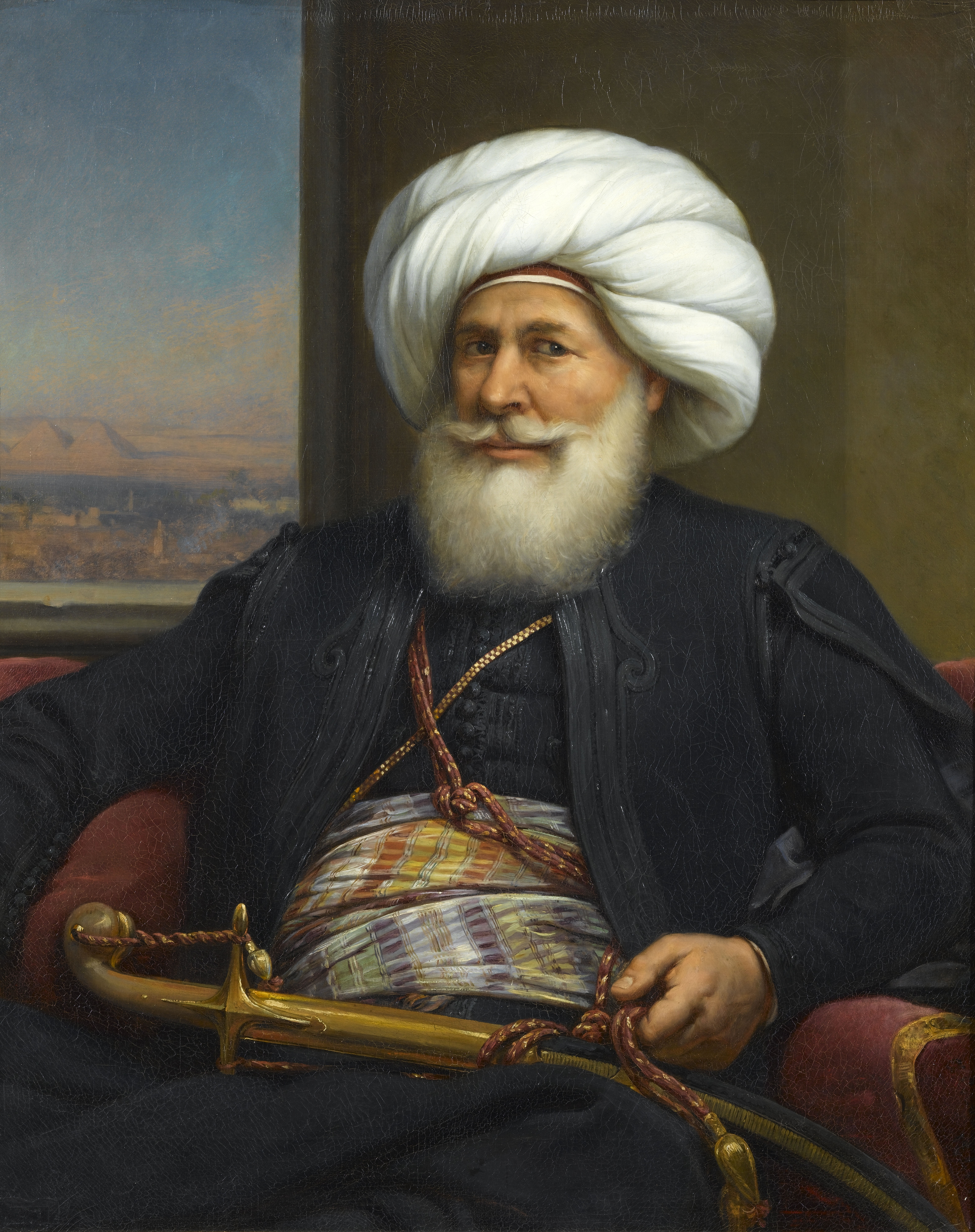
- Muhammad Ali of Egypt, a prominent figure in Egyptian history.
- Style: Beylerbey; Wāli; Qaim'aqam
- Residence: Cairo, Egypt Eyalet, Ottoman Empire
- Appointer: Sultan of the Ottoman Empire
- Precursor: Mamluk Sultans of Egypt
- Formation: 1517
- First holder: Yunus Pasha
- Final holder: Hurshid Ahmed Pasha (last to be independently appointed by Sultan); Isma'il Pasha of Egypt (last with title wāli); Abbas II of Egypt (last Ottoman recognized Khedive)
- Abolished: 19 December 1914
- Succession: Khedives of Egypt; Sultans of Egypt

The Ottoman Empire's governors of Egypt from 1517 to 1805 were at various times known by different but synonymous titles, among them beylerbey, viceroy, governor, governor-general, or, more generally, wāli. Furthermore, the Ottoman sultans very often changed positions of their governors in rapid succession, leading to complex and long lists of incumbents (this being the main reason for a political crisis in 1623, where the local Ottoman soldiers successfully sued to keep Kara Mustafa Pasha as governor after his replacement by Çeşteci Ali Pasha after only one year).

Governors ruled from the Cairo Citadel in Cairo. They ruled along with their divan (governmental council), consisting of a kadı (judge) and defterdar (treasurer). The title "beylerbey" refers to the regular governors specifically appointed to the post by the Ottoman sultan, while the title "kaymakam", when used in the context of Ottoman Egypt, refers to an acting governor who ruled over the province between the departure of the previous governor and the arrival of the next one. Although almost all governors were succeeded and preceded by a kaymakam due to the traveling distance from their old post to Egypt, only the most notable are included in this list.

Below is a list of Ottoman wālis of the Egypt Eyalet of the Ottoman Empire from 1517 (the Ottoman conquest of Egypt) to 1805 (the beginning of the Muhammad Ali dynasty; see list of monarchs of the Muhammad Ali dynasty). Governors of Egypt after 1805 are not included in this list because, although they were still nominally and officially Ottoman governors of the province, they assumed the monarchical title "Khedive" that was unrecognized by the central Ottoman government and passed the role in a hereditary fashion. Acting governors (kaymakams) are not included in the numbering.

No.	Governor		Start	End	Title	Origin	Identity notes (Note: This is the column for including and viewing as many independent sources on the identity and name of that particular governor, independent sources being sources that do not reference one another.)	Tenure notes
1	Yunus Pasha		1517	1517	Beylerbey	Albanian, Greek, or Bulgarian		Governorship revoked for corruption
2	Hayır Bey	No picture available	1517	1522	Beylerbey	Abkhazian		Died in office
3	Çoban Mustafa Pasha	No picture available	1522	1523	Beylerbey	Bosniak		Put down a small Mamluk revolt
4	Hain Ahmed Pasha	No picture available	1523	1524	Sultan	Georgian		Rebelled, declared himself sultan; was executed
5	Güzelce Kasım Paşa (1st)	No picture available	1524	1525	Beylerbey			
6	Pargalı Ibrahim Pasha		1525	1525	Beylerbey	Orthodox Balkanian		Remained for 3 months, organized the civil and military system of Ottoman Egypt
7	Güzelce Kasım Paşa (2nd)	No picture available	1525	1525	Beylerbey			
8	Hadım Süleyman Pasha (1st)		1525	1535	Beylerbey	Greek		
9	Divane Hüsrev Pasha	No picture available	1535	1537	Beylerbey	Bosniak		
10	Hadım Süleyman Pasha (2nd)		1537	1538	Beylerbey	Greek		
11	Davud Pasha	No picture available	1538	1549	Beylerbey			Long-standing feud with Rüstem Pasha; died in office
–	Lala Kara Mustafa Pasha		1549	1549	Kaymakam	Bosniak		Served only a few months as acting governor
12	Semiz Ali Pasha	No picture available	1549	1553	Beylerbey	Bosniak		Appointed to another position in Constantinople
13	Dukakinzade Mehmed Pasha		1553	1556	Beylerbey			Used to sing in public with a guitar; executed for violating sharia
14	Iskender Pasha	No picture available	1556	1559	Beylerbey			Had many public works built between Bab Zuweila and Bab al-Khalq
15	Sofu Hadım Ali Pasha	No picture available	1559	1560	Beylerbey			Also known as Sufi Ali Pasha or Hadım Ali Pasha; died in office
16	Kara Şahin Mustafa Pasha	No picture available	1560	1563	Beylerbey	Bosniak		Founder of the Ridwan dynasty, former governor of Gaza
17	Müezzinzade Ali Pasha		1563	1566	Beylerbey	Turk		Also known as Sufi or Sofu Ali Pasha
18	Mahmud Pasha	No picture available	1566	1567	Beylerbey	Bosniak		Built the Mosque of Mahmud Pasha and assassinated in office by gunfire
19	Koca Sinan Pasha (1st)		1567	1569	Beylerbey	Albanian		
20	Çerkes Iskender Pasha	No picture available	1569	1571	Beylerbey			Known locally as al-Faqih, "the jurist"
21	Koca Sinan Pasha (2nd)		1571	1573	Beylerbey	Albanian		
22	Hüseyin Pasha Boljanić	No picture available	1573	1574	Beylerbey	Bosniak		Of a mild disposition, but thieves multiplied during his short term
23	Hadim Mesih Pasha	No picture available	1574	1580	Beylerbey	Bosniak		Put to death many thieves, stunting robbery in the region for centuries
24	Hadım Hasan Pasha	No picture available	1580	1583	Beylerbey	Albanian		Jailed in Constantinople
25	Damat Ibrahim Pasha	No picture available	1583	1585	Beylerbey	Bosniak or Croat		
26	Defterdar Sinan Pasha	No picture available	1585	1587	Beylerbey			Dismissed after being unable to collect enough taxes
27	Kara Üveys Pasha	No picture available	1587	1590	Beylerbey		(Note: Sicill-i Osmani and Öztuna both say simply "Üveys Pasha," but the subject of that article by that name died much earlier than this. Only named Kara because that's what the only existing Wikipedia article on him (on the German Wikipedia) is named.)	Died in office
28	Hadım Hafız Ahmed Pasha	No picture available	1590	1594	Beylerbey			Appointed governor of Bursa
29	Kurd Mehmed Pasha	No picture available	1594	1596	Beylerbey			
30	Emir Mehmed Pasha	No picture available	1596	1598	Beylerbey			Known as al-Sharif and seyyid, often visited the Al-Hussein Mosque
31	Hızır Pasha	No picture available	1598	1601	Beylerbey			
32	Yavuz Ali Pasha	No picture available	1601	1603	Beylerbey	Serb	(Note: He was succeeded by Maktul Hacı Ibrahim Pasha; a kaymakam (acting governor) ruled between his departure from governorship in December 1603 and the arrival of Ibrahim Pasha in early 1604.)	Appointed as Grand Vizier
33	Maktul Hacı Ibrahim Pasha	No picture available	1604	1604	Beylerbey			Murdered in a sepahi mutiny
34	Hadım Mehmed Pasha	No picture available	1604	1605	Beylerbey	Georgian	(Note: Öztuna refers to this governor as "Gürci Mehmed Pasha," which is technically correct because he was indeed of Georgian origins, but Gürcü Mehmed Pasha is referred to distinctly from this person and was about 30 years younger than this Hadım Mehmed Pasha.)	Attempted to get the mutiny under control, but failed
35	Yemenli Hasan Pasha	No picture available	1605	1607	Beylerbey	Albanian		Previously the beylerbey of Yemen Eyalet (1580–1604)
36	Öküz Mehmed Pasha		1607	1611	Beylerbey	Turk		Known as "kul kıran" (slavebreaker) for putting down sipahi mutiny
37	Sofu Mehmed Pasha	No picture available	1611	1615	Beylerbey	Bulgarian	(Note: According to Sicill-i Osmani, he was from Razgrad. After his governorship, he later became the governor of Rumelia (1617), Sivas (1617–19), and Budin (1624–26). He died in 1626.)	Not to be confused with Grand Vizier Sofu Mehmed Pasha
38	Nişancı Ahmed Pasha	No picture available	1615	1618	Beylerbey			Head of Janissaries (1615); not the same as Grand Vizier Nişancı Ahmed Pasha
39	Lefkeli Mustafa Pasha	No picture available	1618	1618	Beylerbey	Cypriot		Left governance mostly in the hands of his family, corruption ensued
40	Cafer Pasha	No picture available	1618	1619	Beylerbey			Educated in various sciences and formerly governor of Yemen
41	Hamidi Mustafa Pasha	No picture available	1619	1620	Beylerbey			Also known as Ispartalı Mustafa Pasha, dismissed for anti-merchant policies
42	Mere Hüseyin Pasha	No picture available	1620	1622	Beylerbey	Albanian		Dismissed after the flooding of the Nile caused a drought
43	Biber Mehmed Pasha	No picture available	1622	1622	Beylerbey			Dismissed after 75 days; also known as Pır or Babür; former wali of Budin
44	Silahdar Ibrahim Pasha	No picture available	1622	1623	Beylerbey			Drought led to his dismissal and successor accused him of financial fraud
45	Kara Mustafa Pasha (1st)	No picture available	1623	1623	Beylerbey			Not the same as Grand Vizier Kara Mustafa Pasha
46	Çeşteci Ali Pasha	No picture available	1623	1623	Beylerbey			Soldiers restored Kara Mustafa Pasha
47	Kara Mustafa Pasha (2nd)	No picture available	1624	1626	Beylerbey			Soldiers, angry at the rapid change in governors, restored him
48	Bayram Pasha	No picture available	1626	1628	Beylerbey	Turkish		Invested and speculated heavily in local merchants and businesses
49	Tabanıyassı Mehmed Pasha	No picture available	1628	1630	Beylerbey	Albanian		Only appeared 6 times in public, but was well-liked
50	Koca Musa Pasha	No picture available	1630	1631	Beylerbey	Bosniak		Army forced his resignation after his brutality and murder of a local bey
51	Halil Pasha	No picture available	1631	1633	Beylerbey		(Note: Öztuna's Büyük Osmanlı Tarihi claims that this was Damat Halil Pasha, but it is incorrect; their lifetimes don't match up, and it was known that this was a distinct person.)	Known for his "gentle, impartial, and prosperous administration"
52	Bakırcı Ahmed Pasha	No picture available	1633	1635	Beylerbey			Dismissed and executed either for his cruelty or his monetary policy
53	Gazi Hüseyin Pasha	No picture available	1635	1637	Beylerbey	Turk		Cruel and violent, but kept the army in check
54	Sultanzade Mehmed Pasha	No picture available	1637	1640	Beylerbey	Albanian		Confiscated many emirs' and wealthy residents' inheritances
55	Nakkaş Mustafa Pasha	No picture available	1640	1642	Beylerbey			His officials were the de jure rulers and plundered the land
56	Maksud Pasha	No picture available	1642	1644	Beylerbey			Previous wali of Diyarbekir; overthrown by army and executed by sultan
57	Eyüb Pasha	No picture available	1644	1646	Beylerbey			Restored order, and after term, gave up all possessions to become a dervish
58	Haydarzade Mehmed Pasha	No picture available	1646	1647	Beylerbey	Turk	(Note: He was the brother-in-law of Melek Ahmed Pasha. He can also be named Haydar Agazade Ahmed Pasha.)	All of his rule was reportedly "only a series of confusions and revolutions"
59	Mostarlı Mustafa Pasha	No picture available	1648	1648	Beylerbey	Bosniak		Neglected affairs and was soon dismissed, but no insurrections occurred
60	Tarhoncu Ahmed Pasha	No picture available	1648	1651	Beylerbey	Albanian		His rule was "agitated by great disturbances," but he managed to raise more funds than expected, as he was known for his economic skill
61	Hadım Abdurrahman Pasha	No picture available	1651	1652	Beylerbey			After his dismissal, he was jailed by successor for not paying debts
62	Haseki Mehmed Pasha	No picture available	1652	1656	Beylerbey			Known locally as Abu'l-Nur, "father of light", for restoring buildings
63	Halıcı Damadı Mustafa Pasha	No picture available	1656	1657	Beylerbey		(Note: He was previously Kapudan Pasha (1656) and Defterdar (1656), according to Sicill-i Osmani.)	
64	Şehsuvarzade Gazi Mehmed Pasha	No picture available	1657	1660	Beylerbey			Known locally as Gazi for putting down a rebellion; jailed afterwards
65	Gürcü Mustafa Pasha	No picture available	1660	1661	Beylerbey	Georgian		Some soldiers tried to replace him with his predecessor but failed
66	Melek Ibrahim Pasha	No picture available	1661	1664	Beylerbey	Turk or Armenian		Reasserted the power of the office over the beys; aka Şeytan Ibrahim Pasha
67	Silahdar Ömer Pasha	No picture available	1664	1667	Beylerbey			Also wali of Baghdad (1677–81, 1684–86), Diyarbekir (1688), and Erzurum
68	Şişman Ibrahim Pasha	No picture available	1667	1668	Beylerbey			Epithet means "fat"; also called Sofu Ibrahim Pasha; died in office Nov. 1668
69	Karakaş Ali Pasha	No picture available	1668	1669	Beylerbey		(Note: He was the previous governor of Silistra Eyalet and Rumelia Eyalet, and he died in January 1670, according to Sicill-i Osmani.)	Assumed office October 1668 or April 1669
70	Bayburtlu Kara Ibrahim Pasha		1669	1673	Beylerbey	Turk		
71	Canpuladzade Hüseyin Pasha	No picture available	1673	1675	Beylerbey		(Note: He was also governor of Bosnia Eyalet (1671–72), Budin Eyalet (1672–?), and Van Eyalet (1680–?), according to Sicill-i Osmani)	
72	Cebeci Ahmed Pasha	No picture available	1675	1676	Beylerbey		(Note: His name is also given as Defterdar Ahmed Pasha because of his long-term previous role as Defterdar (finance minister) of the Ottoman Empire from 1662 to 1675.)	Jailed by the army due to his violence during tax collection
73	Abdi Pasha the Albanian		1676	1680	Beylerbey	Albanian		
74	Osman Pasha the Bosnian	No picture available	1680	1683	Beylerbey	Bosniak		
75	Hamza Pasha	No picture available	1683	1687	Beylerbey			
76	Mollacık Hasan Pasha	No picture available	1687	1687	Beylerbey		(Note: Also referred to as Kethüda Hasan Pasha or Ketkhoda Hasan Pasha (not the same as the 18th-century Kethüda Hasan Pasha) because of his being made a Kethüda early in his career, but he is mostly just referred to as Hasan Pasha. The exact month and day start of his term are disputed, according to Holt.)	Also called by the epithet Kethüda/Ketkhoda, but mostly just Hasan Pasha
77	Damat Hasan Pasha (1st)	No picture available	1687	1689	Beylerbey	Greek		
78	Sarhoş Ahmed Pasha	No picture available	1689	1691	Beylerbey	Bosniak	(Note: He previously served as Kapudan Pasha (1684–1685) and the Ottoman governor (wali) of Özü Eyalet (1674, 1677), Karaman Eyalet (i.e. Konya; 1674–1677), Anatolia Eyalet (1677), Eğri Eyalet (1677, again in 1677), Aleppo Eyalet (1685–1686), and Baghdad Eyalet (1687–1688), according to Sicill-i Osmani.)	Died in office on 13 March 1691
79	Hazinedar Moralı Ali Pasha	No picture available	1691	1695	Beylerbey		(Note: Also known as Moralı Hazinedar Ali Pasha (epithets switched))	Also known as Moralı Hazinedar Ali Pasha (epithets switched)
80	Çelebi Ismail Pasha	No picture available	1695	1697	Beylerbey		(Note: He used to be a Janissary, eventually becoming the agha (head) of the Janissaries. He also served as the Ottoman governor (wali) of Rumelia Eyalet (1685–?), Sidon Eyalet (?–1689/90), Karaman Eyalet (1689/90–1691/92), Anatolia Eyalet (1691/92), Damascus Eyalet (1692/93–1693/94), Crete Eyalet (1693/94–1695), Baghdad Eyalet (1697–1699), and Van Eyalet (1699–1701). He died in November or December 1702.)	Deposed by the local soldiers
–	Kesici Hasan Pasha	No picture available	1697	1698	Kaymakam		(Note: Al-Damurdashi claims his name is Mustafa Bey Kizlar in his Chronicles, but Holt warns repeatedly to avoid taking Damurdashi's data too literally, as much of it is for literary effect, while Mehmet Süreyya Bey claims someone named Kesici Hasan Pasha was the governor during this period in Sicill-i Osmani. Holt declares a 5 month vacation of the office, which indicates the rule of a kaymakam (acting governor). Öztuna is silent, attaching the end of the term of Ismail Pasha straight to the beginning of Hüseyin Pasha's.)	Acting governor, installed by soldiers; served for 5 to 8 months
81	Firari Hüseyin Pasha	No picture available	1698	1699	Beylerbey		(Note: May be found at the following article names: Dizveren Sarı Hüseyin Pasha, Sarı Dizveren Hüseyin Pasha, Bosniak Sarı Hüseyin Pasha, Boşnak Sarı Hüseyin Pasha, Bosniak Firari Sarı Hüseyin Pasha, Boşnak Firari Sarı Hüseyin Pasha, Muradi Husayn Pasha, Muradi Hüseyin Pasha, or similar.)	Also known by the epithets Boşnak (Bosniak), Sarı, Dizveren, and Muradi
82	Kara Mehmed Pasha (1st)	No picture available	1699	1704	Beylerbey			
83	Baltacı Süleyman Pasha	No picture available	1704	1704	Beylerbey			Never took office
84	Rami Mehmed Pasha	No picture available	1704	1706	Beylerbey			
85	Dellak Ali Pasha (1st)	No picture available	1706	1707	Beylerbey		(Note: Damurdashi gives his name as Izmirli Ali Pasha in his Chronicles, but Holt warns that Damurdashi's accounts are largely fictional and warns to treat its data "with caution," while Mehmet Süreyya Bey gives his name as Dellak Ali Pasha (as does Öztuna). These two names seem to be distinct people, as the list of Bulgarian rulers gives their governorships of Bulgaria as distinct terms (albeit being immediately after one another), so it could go either way. However, Mehmet Süreyya Bey's encyclopedia of Ottoman statesmen says that a man named Hüseyin Pasha (who was a kethüda) was the governor of Egypt during this exact time, while his list says Dellak Ali Pasha was, BUT that he was followed the same year by someone named Kethüda Hasan Ağa. Von Hammer indicates only "Ali." He was succeeded by a kaymakam (acting governor) known as either Kethüda Hüseyin Pasha or Kethüda Hasan Agha.)	
86	Damat Hasan Pasha (2nd)	No picture available	1707	1709	Beylerbey	Greek		
87	Moralı Ibrahim Pasha	No picture available	1709	1710	Beylerbey			Jailed and exiled by the sultan after dismissal
88	Köse Halil Pasha	No picture available	1710	1711	Beylerbey			Overthrown by local beys
89	Veli Mehmed Pasha (1st)	No picture available	1711	1712	Beylerbey			There was an insurrection begun by a Turkish religious fanatic, but it failed
90	Kara Mehmed Pasha (2nd)	No picture available	1712	1712	Beylerbey			Held the office for a minuscule amount of time
91	Veli Mehmed Pasha (2nd)	No picture available	1712	1714	Beylerbey			
92	Abdi Pasha (1st)	No picture available	1714	1716	Beylerbey		(Note: Sicilli says "Abdi Pasha" (but does not include him in the definitions, just the order of walis), Öztuna says "Arnavudlu Abdi Pasha", everywhere else (including Damurdashi and al-Jabarti) says "Abidin Pasha" (pronounced "Abidi Pasha"))	Ended the remains of the insurrection begun in 1711 by the religious fanatic
93	Dellak Ali Pasha (2nd)	No picture available	1716	1720	Beylerbey			His rule was calm, but the sultan ordered his execution
94	Recep Pasha	No picture available	1720	1721	Beylerbey	Albanian or Bosniak		Dismissed after failing to assassinate ibn Iwaz on the sultan's orders
95	Nişancı Mehmed Pasha (1st)	No picture available	1721	1725	Beylerbey	Armenian	(Note: He previously served as the Grand Vizier from 1717 to 1718.)	Deposed by the forces of Çerkes Mehmed Bey after displeasing him
96	Moralı Ali Pasha	No picture available	1725	1726	Beylerbey	Greek		
97	Nişancı Mehmed Pasha (2nd)	No picture available	1726	1727	Beylerbey	Armenian		
98	Ebubekir Pasha (1st)	No picture available	1727	1729	Beylerbey	Turk		
99	Abdi Pasha (2nd)	No picture available	1729	1729	Beylerbey			
100	Köprülü Abdullah Pasha	No picture available	1729	1731	Beylerbey	Albanian	(Note: Although Öztuna says that he served again in 1733–34, and he got this from the Sicill-i Osmani order of Egypt valis, they are both wrong. Both al-Jabarti and the encyclopedia of Sicill-i Osmani only show Abdullah Pasha being governor of Egypt only once; besides, he was in Persia during this time, according to Sicill-i Osmani.)	
101	Silahdar Damat Mehmed Pasha	No picture available	1731	1733	Beylerbey		(Note: He previously served as Grand Vizier for a short time in 1731.)	
102	Muhassıl Osman Pasha	No picture available	1733	1735	Beylerbey			There was a man claiming to be a prophet, and widespread apocalyptic fears
103	Ebubekir Pasha (2nd)	No picture available	1735	1739	Beylerbey	Turk	(Note: Al-Jabarti holds that he was succeeded by someone named Mustafa Pasha, who held the office until 1739, but no other evidence can be found of him.)	Deposed by local troops
104	Sulayman Pasha al-Azm	No picture available	1739	1740	Beylerbey	Turk or Arab		Deposed by local troops
105	Hekimoğlu Ali Pasha (1st)	No picture available	1740	1741	Beylerbey	Venetian	(Note: He served as Grand Vizier before (1732–35) and after (1742–43 and 1755) his term as governor.)	His rule was peaceful and free of insurrections
106	Hatibzade Yahya Pasha	No picture available	1741	1743	Beylerbey			He was the son-in-law of predecessor Hekimoğlu Ali Pasha
107	Yedekçi Mehmed Pasha	No picture available	1743	1744	Beylerbey		(Note: Al-Jabarti reports that he served until 1745 or 1746, not 1744.)	Troops rioted, demanding pay and rations from the granary
108	Koca Mehmed Ragıp Pasha		1744	1748	Beylerbey	Turk	(Note: He later served as Grand Vizier from 1757 to 1763.)	He was a "profound scholar"; forced to step down by local troops
109	Yeğen Ali Pasha	No picture available	1748	1748	Beylerbey			Nephew of Yedekçi Mehmed Pasha; never took office, only appointed for a week
110	Nişancı Ahmed Pasha	No picture available	1748	1751	Beylerbey	Turk	(Note: He previously served as Grand Vizier from 1740 to 1742. Also referred to as Şehla Ahmed Pasha.)	Interested in the sciences, but found Egyptians to be largely uneducated
111	Seyyid Abdullah Pasha	No picture available	1751	1753	Beylerbey	Arab	(Note: He previously served as Grand Vizier from 1747 to 1750.)	
112	Divitdar Mehmed Emin Pasha	No picture available	1753	1753	Beylerbey		(Note: He previously served as Grand Vizier from 1750 to 1752.)	Died very soon after taking office
113	Baltacızade Mustafa Pasha	No picture available	1752	1756	Beylerbey		(Note: He also served as the Ottoman governor of Morea Eyalet (1746–47), Sanjak of Eğriboz (1747–48), Aidin Eyalet (1748), Sanjak of Candia (Heraklion, 1748–50, again in 1751 and 1752), Crete Eyalet (1750–51), and Sidon Eyalet (1756–57), according to Sicill-i Osmani. He died in 1762 in Didymoteicho. Öztuna refers to him as Baltacı Mustafa Pasha.)	
114	Hekimoğlu Ali Pasha (2nd)	No picture available	1756	1757	Beylerbey	Venetian		His second term was again largely peaceful
115	Sa'deddin Pasha al-Azm	No picture available	1757	1757	Beylerbey	Turk or Arab		Nephew of Sulayman Pasha al-Azm
116	Yirmisekizzade Mehmed Said Pasha		1757	1758	Beylerbey	Georgian	(Note: He served as Grand Vizier (1755–56) before his term as governor.)	
117	Köse Bahir Mustafa Pasha (1st)	No picture available	1758	1761	Beylerbey	Turk	(Note: He served as Grand Vizier before (1752–55, 1756) and after (1763–65) his terms as governor.)	
118	Kamil Ahmed Pasha	No picture available	1761	1761	Beylerbey			Deposed in August 1761 by the local emirs
119	Köse Bahir Mustafa Pasha (2nd)	No picture available	1761	1762	Beylerbey	Turk		Reinstalled by the local emirs
120	Ebubekir Rasim Pasha	No picture available	1762	1762	Beylerbey			Died two months into term, buried in the City of the Dead necropolis in Cairo
121	Ahıskalı Mehmed Pasha	No picture available	1762	1764	Beylerbey		(Note: According to Sicill-i Osmani, he previously served as Kapudan Pasha from 1761 to 1762. He also served as the Ottoman governor of Vidin Eyalet (1759–61), Karaman Eyalet (1764–66), and Kars Eyalet (1766–67). He died in April 1767 after being hit by a rock thrown by angry citizens in Kars Eyalet while he was serving as governor there.)	
122	Hacı Ahmed Pasha	No picture available	1764	1764	Beylerbey	Gagauz or Albanian	(Note: He previously served as Defterdar (finance minister) of the Ottoman Empire from 1755 to 1756, from 1757 to 1758, and from 1760 to 1762. He then served as the Ottoman governor of Morea Eyalet (1762–63) and Sanjak of Eğriboz (1763–64). All according to Sicill-i Osmani.)	Died soon after taking office in September 1764
123	Macar Hacı Hasan Pasha	No picture available	1764	1765	Beylerbey	Hungarian		Dismissed soon after taking office
124	Silahdar Mahir Hamza Pasha	No picture available	1765	1767	Beylerbey		(Note: He later served as Grand Vizier in 1768.)	Deposed by the local emirs
125	Çelebi Mehmed Pasha	No picture available	1767	1767	Beylerbey		(Note: Al-Jabarti makes no mention of him and is vague.)	
126	Rakım Mehmed Pasha	No picture available	1767	1768	Beylerbey			Deposed by Ali Bey Al-Kabir after making a move against him
–	Ali Bey Al-Kabir		1768	1769	Kaymakam	Georgian	(Note: Uzunçarşılı claims that he held power until 1773 (Kara Halil Pasha), but Sicill-i Osmani disagrees, naming 3 interceding governors. Even Al-Jabarti declares that Ali Bey gave up power in 1769 when a new governor from Istanbul was assigned (although he doesn't name him). Uzunçarşılı probably read Al-Jabarti's chronicle, but missed the part about the new pasha coming in 1769, since after that, Al-Jabarti does not name any other pasha by name or sequence until 1773 with Kara Halil Pasha.)	Became acting governor after forcing out the last governor
127	Köprülü Hafız Ahmed Pasha	No picture available	1769	1769	Beylerbey	Albanian	(Note: Öztuna has Divitdar Mehmed Emin Pasha following him for a second term, but since he died soon after taking office the first time in 1753, this is impossible.)	Died shortly after taking office
128	Kelleci Osman Pasha	No picture available	1769	1771	Beylerbey		(Note: According to Sicill-i Osmani, he was of Georgian origins, beginning as a slave. After serving as governor of Egypt, he became the governor of Sivas Eyalet (1771), Sanjak of Tirhala (1771), Morea Eyalet (1771–72), Sanjak of Eğriboz (1772). He had a large role in keeping the Russian siege out of Varna in 1773. He died in 1774.)	After him, a kaymakam (acting governor) probably ruled for a year
129	Vekil Osman Pasha	No picture available	1772	1773	Beylerbey		(Note: According to Sicill-i Osmani, he was originally a local bey in Egypt before going to Mecca for a short while and then becoming governor.)	Died shortly after taking office
130	Kara Halil Pasha	No picture available	1773	1774	Beylerbey		(Note: According to Sicill-i Osmani, he was from the city of Çorlu, and was thus sometimes known as Çorlulu Kara Halil Pasha or Çorlulu Halil Pasha. He was also the governor of Belgrade (1768–?) and Jeddah (1774–75). He died in 1775.)	Had little power; actual power was held by Mamluk Muhammad Bey Abu'l-Dhahab
131	Hacı Ibrahim Pasha	No picture available	1774	1775	Beylerbey		(Note: According to Sicill-i Osmani, he was from the town of Arapgir. He died in September 1775. Al-Jabarti claims that the governor during this time was "Mustafa Pasha al-Nablusi", and holds that an Ibrahim Pasha was briefly governor in 1779 before dying, which raises the possibility that Sicill-i is mistaken and that this Hacı Ibrahim Pasha died in November 1779, not September 1775, and was the governor then. However, Sicill-i Osmani makes no mention of him being governor of Jeddah in the past, which al-Jabarti claims he was right before becoming the governor of Egypt.)	
132	Izzet Mehmed Pasha	No picture available	1775	1778	Beylerbey	Greek	(Note: He served as Grand Vizier before (1774) and after (1781–82) his term as governor. Sicill-i Osman refers to him in the index governors listing as Şehrî İzzet Paşa (but not the main encyclopedia) because of his previous position as şehremini ("caretaker of the city"). An acting governor served after his removal from office in July 1778 until the arrival of Raif Ismail Pasha in January 1779, according to al-Jabarti.)	Deposed by local emirs Mamluk on 15 July 1778
133	Raif Ismail Pasha (1st)	No picture available	1779	1779	Beylerbey		(Note: He served as Reisülküttap from 1774 to 1776, and became the governor of Crete from 1781 to 1782. He was executed in 1785. He may also be referred to as Ismail Raif Pasha. Although Öztuna makes no mention of him, he is included in Al-Jabarti, who mentions his previous role as Reisülküttap and gives a thorough description of his personality and physical appearance, and he is included as a governor of Egypt in Sicill-i Osmani during this time. According to al-Jabarti, he took office on 23 January 1779, by arriving in Cairo.)	He was replaced by the sultan in late September 1779 with Ibrahim Pasha
134	Ibrahim Pasha	No picture available	1779	1779	Beylerbey		(Note: Öztuna and Sicill-i Osmani make no mention of him, but al-Jabarti, whose history for this period is first hand and likely more accurate than Sicill-i (and Öztuna, who almost exclusively uses Sicill-i as his only source and is quite vague on this period), holds that he was the former governor of Jeddah Eyalet. According to al-Jabarti, in September 1779, the sultan ordered that he trade positions with Raif Ismail Pasha, with Ibrahim Pasha becoming governor of Egypt and Raif Ismail Pasha becoming governor of Jeddah in his stead. He was probably distinct from Hacı Ibrahim Pasha (died 1775), as he died in November 1779 and held office later.)	He died in office in November 1779 (one month after his arrival)
135	Raif Ismail Pasha (2nd)	No picture available	1779	1780	Beylerbey			Reappointed November 1779, but deposed by local Mamluk emirs in July 1780
–	Ibrahim Bey (1st)		1780	1781	Kaymakam	Georgian		The sultan gave office back to Raif Ismail Pasha, but Ibrahim Bey didn't comply
136	Melek Mehmed Pasha	No picture available	1781	1782	Beylerbey	Bosniak	(Note: He later served as Grand Vizier from 1792 to 1794. Öztuna says he served from 1779, but Sicill-i Osmani says he served from 1780. Al-Jabarti describes him as a "distinguished-looking man with gray hair." He arrived in Egypt in February 1781, and left office to become grand vizier in July 1782.)	His rule was peaceful and he was well-liked by the emirs
137	Name unknown	No picture available	1782	1783	Beylerbey		(Note: Although al-Jabarti mentions that a pasha served as governor at this time (in between Melek Mehmed Pasha and Silahdar Mehmed Pasha from July 1782 to July 1783) (see identity al-Jabarti citation), he does not mention his name. An unknown source implies that it might have been someone with the name or partial name "Sharif Pasha" ("Şerif Pasha" in Turkish).)	His identity is unknown, perhaps partially named "Sharif/Şerif Pasha"
138	Silahdar Mehmed Pasha	No picture available	1783	1784	Beylerbey		(Note: He previously served as Grand Vizier from 1770 to 1771.)	Deposed by the Mamluk bey Murad Bey on 30 October 1784
–	Murad Bey		1784	1785	Kaymakam	Georgian or Circassian		He deposed his predecessor, but he was already the de facto ruler of Egypt
–	Ibrahim Bey (2nd)		1784	1785	Kaymakam	Georgian		The incoming governor made him acting governor on 20 February 1785
139	Yeğen Seyyid Mehmed Pasha	No picture available	1785	1786	Beylerbey		(Note: He previously served as Grand Vizier in 1782. During his term as governor after 1786, real power lay with the Kapudan Pasha Cezayirli Gazi Hasan Pasha, who had been sent by the sultan to rid Egypt of the Mamluk emirs. After he was dismissed and replaced by his successor Abdi Pasha on 24 October 1786, Cezayirli Gazi Hasan Pasha demanded an audit of his accounts in order to recover money to pay for the upkeep of the Ottoman army stationed in Egypt waiting to combat the Mamluk emirs. Combined with the debts owed to him by the wanted emirs and the death of his wife, Yeğen Seyyid Mehmed Pasha became very distressed. He was forced to sell his furniture and clothing to pay what he owed according to Hasan Pasha's audit. According to al-Jabarti, tension was rumored to constantly exist between Yeğen Seyyid Mehmed Pasha and Hasan Pasha since Hasan Pasha's arrival in early August 1786.)	Cezayirli Gazi Hasan Pasha expelled the Mamluk emirs (Murad and Ibrahim)
–	Cezayirli Gazi Hasan Pasha		1786	1787	Admiral	Georgian		De facto ruler when Keki Abdi Pasha refused the office until emirs were defeated
140	Keki Abdi Pasha (1st)	No picture available	1787	1788	Beylerbey			Appointed on 24 October 1786, but left governance to Hasan Pasha for a while
141	Ismail Pasha the Tripolitanian (1st)	No picture available	1788	1789	Beylerbey	Georgian	(Note: He was the former assistant (kethüda) and protégé of Cezayirli Gazi Hasan Pasha. Öztuna's list of governors replaces him with Raif Ismail Pasha, but this is certainly incorrect, as Raif Ismail Pasha was executed in 1785 according to Sicill-i Osmani, which, along with Al-Jabarti (a completely independent source), defines the two men as very distinct people. Öztuna most likely confused them because of their identical names.)	The sultan reinstated Keki Abdi Pasha upon his request on 3 January 1789
142	Keki Abdi Pasha (2nd)	No picture available	1789	1789	Beylerbey			Cezayirli Gazi Hasan Pasha, Ismail Pasha's mentor, asked sultan to reinstate him
143	Ismail Pasha the Tripolitanian (2nd)	No picture available	1789	1791	Beylerbey	Georgian		Dismissed and appointed governor of Morea Eyalet
144	Safranbolulu Izzet Mehmet Pasha	No picture available	1791	1794	Beylerbey		(Note: He served as Grand Vizier before (1774, 1781–82) and after (1794–98) his term as governor. He was governor from early May 1791 to September 1794.)	Murad Bey and Ibrahim Bey, previously exiled in 1786, returned to de facto power
145	Kayserili Hacı Salih Pasha	No picture available	1794	1796	Beylerbey			Mamluk emirs Murad Bey and Ibrahim Bey continued to wield de facto power
The French occupy Egypt in 1798, with Napoleon Bonaparte (1798–99), Jean Baptiste Kléber (1799–1800), and Jacques-François Menou (1800–01) holding de facto governing power.
146	Lokmacı Hacı Ebubekir Pasha	No picture available	1796	1798	Beylerbey		(Note: Sicill-i Osmani says that he was also the governor of Anatolia Eyalet from 1794 to 1796. He "failed to conserve his position" as governor of Egypt and was dismissed in 1798, dying soon afterwards.)	French troops under Napoleon landed at Alexandria and later reached Cairo
147	Abdullah Pasha al-Azm	No picture available	1798	1799	Beylerbey	Turk or Arab	(Note: According to al-Jabarti, on 3 November 1798, a letter arrived in Egypt, making Abdullah Pasha governor.)	Napoleon had him confirmed governor as a sign of Ottoman consent to his rule
148	Nasuh Pasha al-Azm	No picture available	1800	1801	Beylerbey	Turk or Arab	(Note: He was previously fighting against the French in Egypt alongside Murad Bey. According to Sicill-i Osmani, he was appointed governor in August 1799, but according to al-Jabarti, he only arrived and took office in late February 1800.)	The French left Cairo (and eventually Egypt altogether)
The French occupation ends in 1801, succumbing to a combined British and Ottoman attack.
149	Ebu Merak Mehmed Pasha	No picture available	1801	1801	Beylerbey		(Note: He became governor on 9 August 1801. Between his dismissal on 21 September 1801 and his successor Koca Hüsrev Mehmed Pasha's arrival on 22 January 1802, a deputy appointed by Koca Hüsrev Pasha ruled, according to Al-Jabarti volume 3, page 303. According to Sicill-i Osmani (p. 1049), he was from Gaza. After his governorship, he became the Ottoman governor of Konya (1802), Diyarbekir Eyalet (1803), and Sivas Eyalet (1803–04, 1805–06), and Jeddah (1804–05). In 1805, he was taken to Damascus with a group of soldiers. From 1806 to 1812, he lived in Aleppo, but was executed in 1812.)	Dismissed 21 September 1801, he left for his estate on 8 January 1802
150	Koca Hüsrev Mehmed Pasha (1st)		1802	1803	Beylerbey	Abaza	(Note: The news of his appointment came on 21 September 1801, but he only arrived in Cairo and took office on 22 January 1802.)	Arrived 22 January 1802; he was instructed to kill or imprison Mamluk emirs
–	Tahir Pasha	No picture available	1803	1803	Kaymakam	Albanian	(Note: Some sources refer to his name as "Thir Pasha." He was the commander of the Albanian troops sent by the Ottoman sultan in 1801 to fight against the French. He chased his predecessor and legitimate governor Koca Hüsrev Mehmed Pasha out of Cairo and to Damietta in northern Egypt when he failed to pay the Albanian troops due to lack of funding. The local judges confirmed him as kaymakam (acting governor) on 6 May 1803, according to al-Jabarti. After Tahir Pasha in turn failed to pay the salaries of the Turkish (Janissary) troops, two of them assassinated him that same year.)	Seized power; head of Albanian troops; assassinated by Janissaries in 26 days
Albanian troops led by Muhammad Ali of Egypt, originally sent in 1801 by the Ottoman sultan to fight the French, grab de facto control of Egypt from the Ottomans.
151	Müftizade Ahmed Pasha	No picture available	1803	1803	Governor		(Note: Although Sicill-i Osmani is vague about his exact position during this time, it definitely places him as the governor of Medina at this time, and the governor of Damietta a bit earlier, both roles that al-Jabarti specifies that this "Ahmad Pasha" had, leaving little doubt that this was the same Ahmed Pasha. He held actual governorship rule in Egypt for only about 1 day.)	Took power in June against the Albanians, although they had de facto control
–	Ibrahim Bey (3rd; concurrently)		1803	1804	Kaymakam	Georgian		Made governor by Muhammad Ali of Egypt in June, who governed through him
152	Trabluslu Ali Pasha (concurrently)		1803	1804	Beylerbey	Georgian		Sent by the Ottomans in July to take back Egypt from the Albanians, but killed
153	Koca Hüsrev Mehmed Pasha (2nd)		1804	1804	Beylerbey	Abaza	(Note: His "governorship" lasted only 2 days, from 12–14 March 1804, and was a complete farce under Muhammad Ali of Egypt, who held real power. Muhammad Ali made Koca Hüsrev Mehmed Pasha governor in name only until the brothers of the late Tahir Pasha, who had fought against Koca Hüsrev Mehmed Pasha, demanded his exile to northern Egypt. Although his successor Hurshid Ahmed Pasha's governorship was announced 2 days before his governorship, on 10 March, Muhammad Ali still made him governor, even if only for two days.)	He was a puppet governor for 2 days under Muhammad Ali of Egypt
154	Hurshid Ahmed Pasha		1804	1805	Beylerbey	Georgian		Allowed by Muhammad Ali of Egypt to govern, but forced to step down in favor of him
155	Muhammad Ali of Egypt		1805	Muhammad Ali, head of the Albanians, is officially appointed governor in 1805, beginning the Muhammad Ali dynasty; see List of monarchs of the Muhammad Ali Dynasty for viceregal governors after 1805.				

== See also ==
- List of monarchs of the Muhammad Ali Dynasty, 1805–1953
- Egypt Province, Ottoman Empire
- History of Ottoman Egypt
- Lists of rulers of Egypt
