= Kara Mehmed Pasha (died 1722) =

The modern-day location of the Kara Mehmet Pasha Mosque (in blue) in the Aksaray neighborhood of Istanbul, Turkey

Kara Mehmed Pasha (died March or April 1722) was an Ottoman statesman who served as the Ottoman governor of various provinces (eyalets) and sub-provinces (sanjaks). He was also a vizier.

Mehmed Pasha served as the Ottoman governor of Egypt Eyalet (1699–1704, 1712), Sanjak of Karasi (1706–1708), Sidon Eyalet (1708), Sanjak of Inebahti (1708–1710), Rumelia Eyalet (1710), Sanjak of Bender (1710–1712), Sanjak of Trabalus (1712–1714), Azov (1714–1717), Sanjak of Candia (1717–1718), Sanjak of Sakız (1718–1719), and Sanjak of Vidin (1719–1722). He died in office in Vidin in March or April 1722.

He had a mosque built in the neighborhood of Aksaray in Istanbul, in the capital of the Ottoman Empire. However, the Kara Mehmed Pasha Mosque was demolished and was only rediscovered in November 2012, when its former location was found to lie directly on modern-day trolley car tracks across the street from the Pertevniyal Valide Sultan Mosque in the neighborhood.

== See also ==
- List of Ottoman governors of Egypt

Political offices
| Preceded by Firari Hüseyin Pasha | Ottoman Governor of Egypt; 1699–1704 | Succeeded by Baltacı Süleyman Pasha |
| Preceded by Veli Mehmed Pasha | Ottoman Governor of Egypt; 1712 | Succeeded by Veli Mehmed Pasha |
