= Kurd Mehmed Pasha =

Ottoman governor of Egypt from 1594/5 to 1596

Kurd Mehmed Pasha or Kurt Mehmet Pasha (Mehmed Pasha the Wolf; died 1605 or 1606) was an Ottoman statesman who served as the Ottoman governor of Egypt from 1594 or 1595 (specifically, 1003 AH) to April 1596, and the Ottoman governor of Aleppo from 1596 or 1597 (specifically, 1005 AH) sporadically until his death.

He graduated from the palace Enderun School in Istanbul and became kapıcıbaşı ("chief gatekeeper," a sort of master of ceremonies) in 1582.

He died in 1605 or 1606 and was buried in the Gazi Atik Ali Pasha Mosque's cemetery in Istanbul.

== See also ==
- List of Ottoman governors of Egypt

Political offices
Preceded by Hadım Hafız Ahmed Pasha	Ottoman Governor of Egypt; 1594 – April 1596	Succeeded by Emir Mehmed Pasha
