= Safranbolulu Izzet Mehmet Pasha =

Grand Vizier of the Ottoman Empire from 1794 to 1798

Safranbolu Izzet Mehmet Pasha
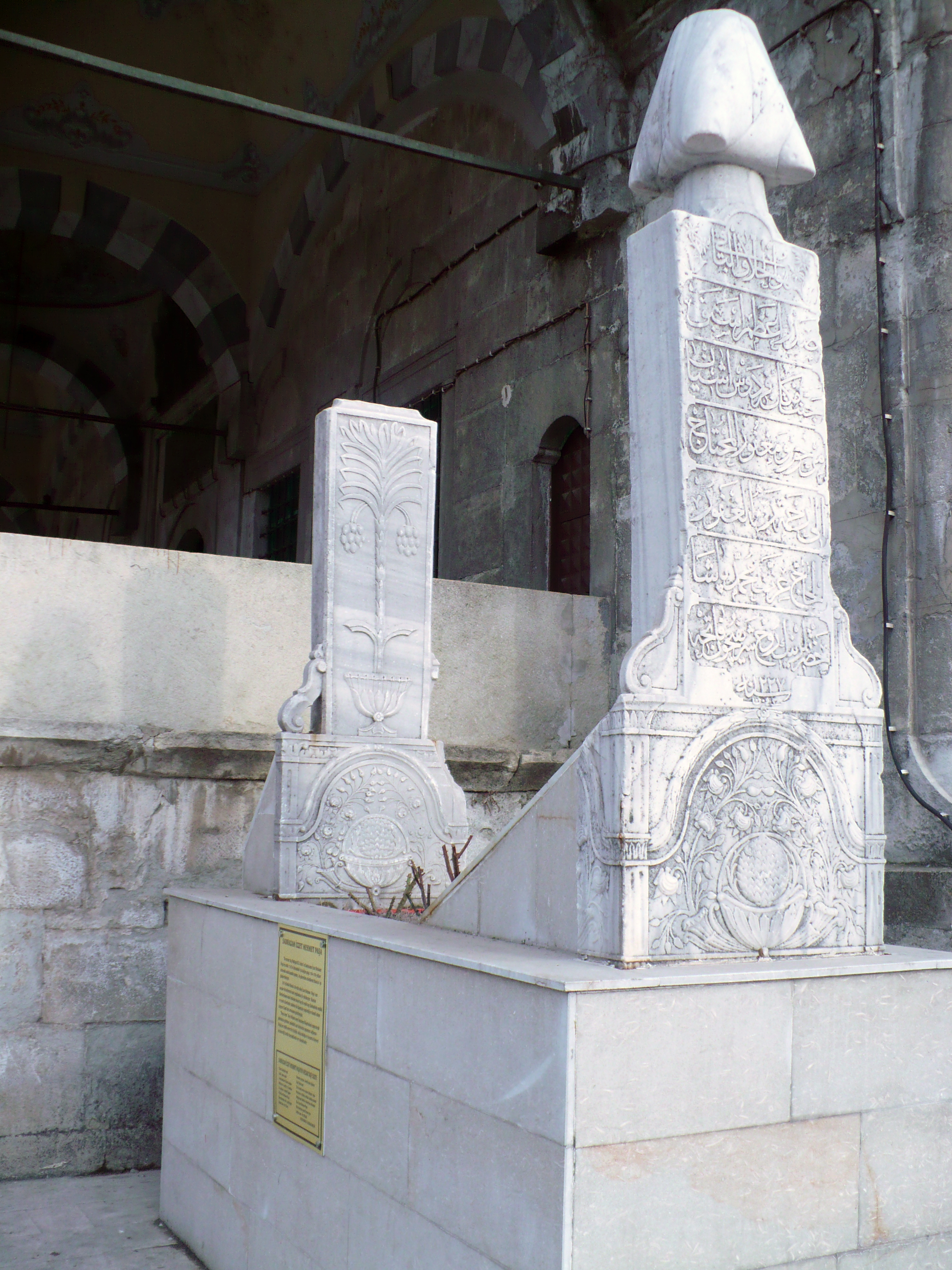
- The tomb of Izzet Mehmet Pasha

Grand Vizier of the Ottoman Empire
- In office 19 October 1794 – 30 August 1798
- Monarch: Selim III
- Preceded by: Melek Mehmed Pasha
- Succeeded by: Kör Yusuf Ziyaüddin Pasha

Ottoman Governor of Egypt
- In office May 1791 – September 1794
- Preceded by: Ismail Pasha
- Succeeded by: Kayserili Hacı Salih Pasha

Personal details
- Born: 1743 Safranbolu, Ottoman Empire
- Died: 18 September 1812 (aged 68–69) Manisa, Ottoman Empire

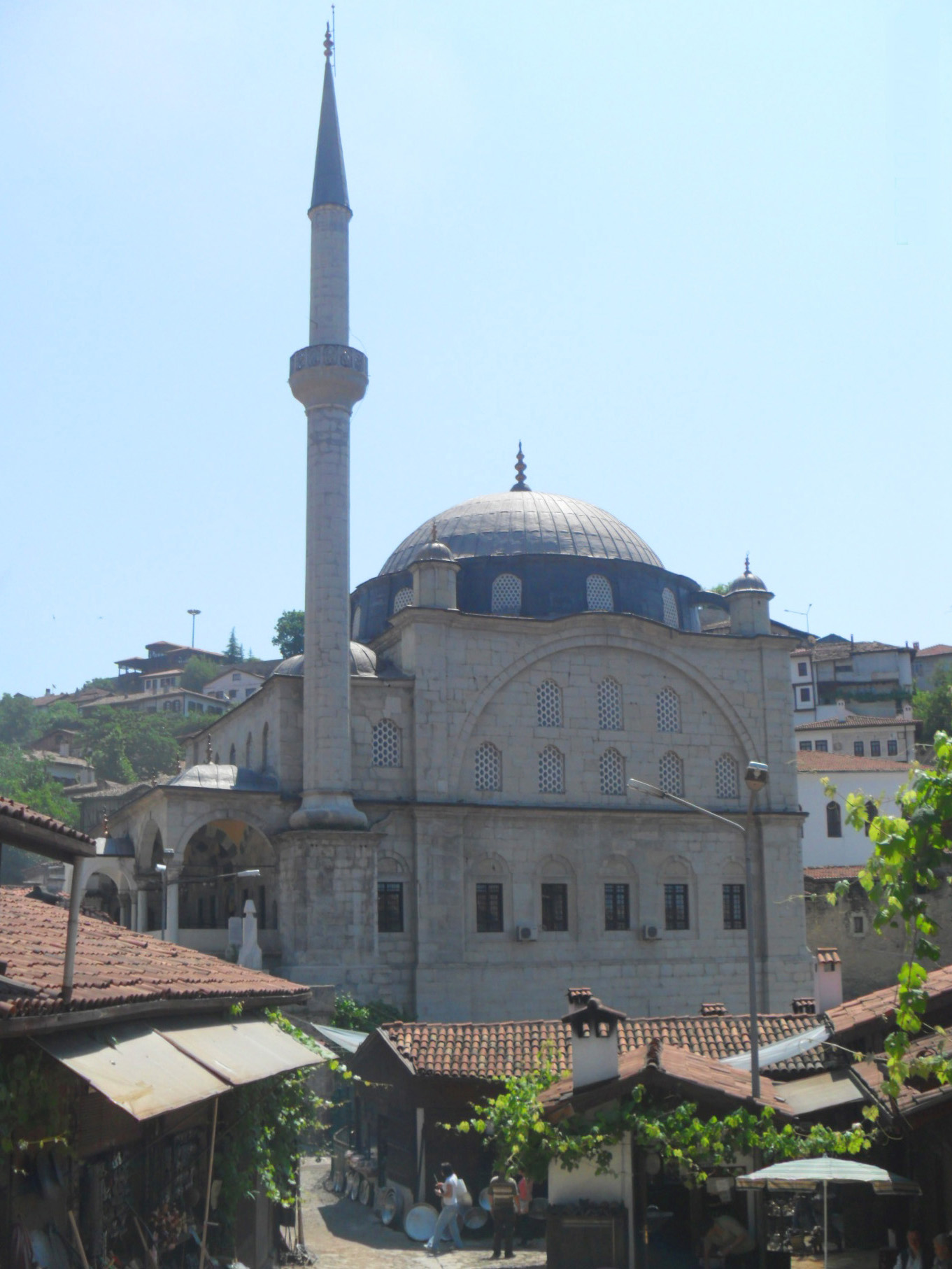
İzzet Mehmet Pasha Mosque

Safranbolulu Izzet Mehmet Pasha (1743 – 18 September 1812) was a grand vizier of the Ottoman Empire and served from 1794 to 1798.

Izzet Mehmet Pasha was born in Safranbolu (today in Karabük Province, Turkey). His uncle was Kapudan Pasha (grand admiral) Hacı Benli Mustafa Pasha. Izzet Mehmed Pasha came to Istanbul in 1759/60 to work with him. In 1778, he married Halil Hamid Pasha's daughter, becoming his son-in-law.

He then served as the Ottoman governor of Jeddah (1787–1790), Morea (1790–1791), and Egypt (May 1791 – September 1794).

On 19 October 1794, he was appointed grand vizier by sultan Selim III. He was dismissed on 30 August 1798 and exiled to Chios (now a Greek island), and then to Manisa. He died in Manisa on 19 September 1812.

== Legacy ==
Izzet Mehmet commissioned a watchtower in 1797 and a mosque in 1798 in his hometown of Safranbolu (see İzzet Mehmet Pasha Mosque).

== See also ==
- List of Ottoman grand viziers
- List of Ottoman governors of Egypt

Political offices
Preceded by Ismail Pasha	Ottoman Governor of Egypt; May 1791 – September 1794	Succeeded by Kayserili Hacı Salih Pasha
Preceded by Melek Mehmed Pasha	Grand Vizier of the Ottoman Empire; 19 October 1794 – 30 August 1798	Succeeded by Kör Yusuf Ziyaeddin Pasha
