= Veli Mehmed Pasha =

Veli Mehmed Pasha (died 1716), also known as Mehmed Veli Pasha or Wālī Pasha, was an Ottoman statesman who served as Kapudan Pasha (1706–1707) and the Ottoman governor of Bosnia Eyalet (1707) and Egypt Eyalet (1711–1714, with a small break in 1712).

When he was governor of Egypt in 1711, a Turkish preacher arrived in Cairo and began to denounce the local Egyptian practice of praying at the graves of Sufi saints, claiming that this was against Islam and that "the miracles of the saints end at the grave." An established local ulama (religious scholar) declared a fatwa against the Turkish preacher, dismissing his claims. However, the preacher had stirred the local populace, and the people threatened an insurrection against Veli Mehmed Pasha's government and violence against the local Sufi masters. When the supporters of the preacher sent a representative to voice their demands to Veli Mehmed, he offered to accept them, but when they left, he informed the Mamluk emirs that the crowd had "behaved disrespectfully," intended to create an insurrection, and had insulted him and his kadı (judge). He also told the emirs that he had decided to leave the city for fear for their lives. The emirs were disturbed at this news and gathered their troops and sanjak-beys, deciding to arrest the leaders of the crowd and banish the Turkish preacher from Cairo. When the emirs' men found those responsible, they punished them with beatings and exile, quelling the insurrection. Veli Mehmed Pasha was dismissed from the governorship of Egypt in 1714.

He was executed on the orders of sultan Ahmed III in June or July 1716.

== See also ==
- List of Ottoman governors of Egypt
- List of Ottoman governors of Bosnia

Political offices
Preceded by Köse Halil Pasha	Ottoman Governor of Egypt; 1711–1712	Succeeded by Kara Mehmed Pasha
Preceded by Kara Mehmed Pasha	Ottoman Governor of Egypt; 1712–1714	Succeeded by Abdi Pasha
