= Ekmekcioğlu Ahmed Pasha =

Ekmekçioğlu Ahmed Pasha or Ekmekçizade Ahmet Paşa (died 1618), was Defterdar (Grand Treasurer) to Sultan Ahmed I from 1606 to 1613. He was a native of Edirne, where he built the Tunca Bridge, the Ekmekcioğlu Caravanserai, and a coffee house with a watering station. He also founded a medrese in Istanbul. He is thought to have been a member or sympathiser of the Gülşeniyye order of dervishes.
