= Moralı Ali Pasha =

Ottoman governor

Moralı Ali Pasha ("Ali Pasha of Morea"; died 1735) was an Ottoman governor-general and provincial army commander. He was originally from the Morea, the present day Peloponnese in Southern Greece (Turkish: Mora). Reliable sources describe Moralı Ali Pasha as being an ethnic Greek Muslim, and as most likely coming from the strategically important and large, wealthy village of Longanikos in upper Laconia in the south of the peninsula. Moralı Ali Pasha was probably born to a Greek Muslim family that had converted to Islam sometime between the Ottoman conquest of the Morea in 1458 and when the Ottoman traveller Evliya Çelebi visited Longanikos in 1688, which he described as having a large population of Greek Muslims who spoke a Greek dialect that he calls Urumşa (sometimes translated as "Greekish").

Following his distinguished service commanding troops in battles in the Morea during the Ottoman-Venetian War (1714-1718) and in Serbia and Transylvania during the Austro-Turkish War (1716-1718), Moralı Ali Pasha was appointed to a succession of provincial governorships. These were mostly in highly volatile and strategic border regions: that of Anatolia Eyalet (1718–19), Aleppo Eyalet (1719), Sanjak of Candia (Ottoman Crete; 1719–20, 1725, 1726, 1730s), Van Eyalet (1720–21), Mosul Eyalet (1721), Sanjak of Eğriboz (1721–25), Egypt Eyalet (1725–26), Sanjak of Özi (1730–?), and Adana Eyalet (1734–1735).

The sources describe Moralı Ali Pasha's conduct during his tenures as governor as ruthless and uncompromising in crushing local dissent. He was also rapacious in his collection of taxes, both from Christians and Muslims (including Greek Muslims like himself), and was consequently an extremely unpopular governor.

== See also ==
- List of Ottoman governors of Egypt

Political offices
Preceded by Nişancı Mehmed Pasha	Ottoman Governor of Egypt; 1725–1726	Succeeded by Nişancı Mehmed Pasha
