= Sofu Hadım Ali Pasha =

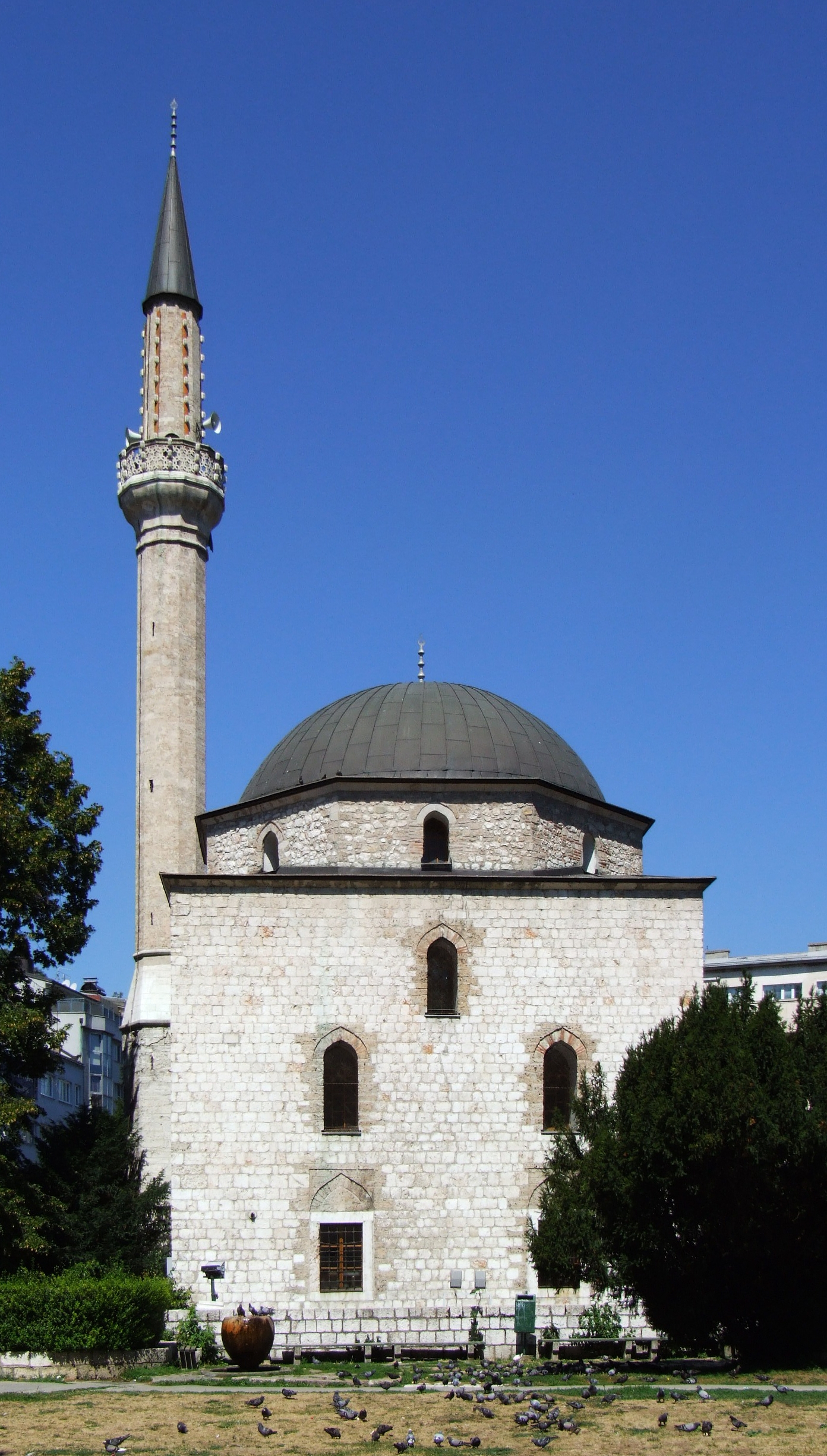
Ali Pasha's Mosque, Sarajevo

Hadım Ali Pasha (also known as Sofu Ali Pasha or Sufi Ali Pasha; died September 1560) was an Ottoman statesman who served as the Ottoman governor of Diyarbekir Eyalet (1537/38 – 1540/41), Bosnia Eyalet (1552 to April 1559), and Egypt Eyalet (April 1559 until his death in office in September 1560).

In 1560, Ali Pasha blocked the reappointment of Seydi Ali Reis to the rank of admiral after his long journey back from Aceh, which was being pushed by Rüstem Pasha. Instead, Sefer Reis was promoted to the supreme command of the Ottoman Empire's entire Indian Ocean fleet.

Ali Pasha died in September 1560 while still in office as the governor of Egypt. He was buried in the Cairo Necropolis in Cairo. After his death, Ali Pasha's vakıf (legacy endowment) had Ali Pasha's Mosque built in Sarajevo (from which he had governed the Bosnia Eyalet) in the classical Istanbul architectural style.

== See also ==
- List of Ottoman governors of Egypt
- List of Ottoman governors of Bosnia

Political offices
Preceded by ?	Governor of Diyarbekir Eyalet; 1537/38 – 1540/41	Succeeded by ?
Preceded by ?	Governor of Bosnia Eyalet; 1552–April 1559	Succeeded by ?
Preceded by Iskender Pasha	Ottoman Governor of Egypt; April 1559–September 1560	Succeeded by Kara Şahin Mustafa Pasha
