= Defter =

Type of tax register and land cadastre in the Ottoman Empire

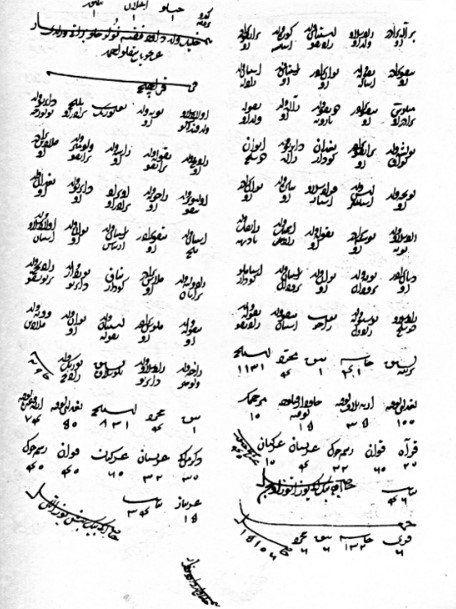
A page from an Ottoman defter from the year 1455

A defter was a type of tax register and land cadastre in the Ottoman Empire.

== Etymology ==
The term is derived from Greek diphthera διφθέρα, literally 'processed animal skin, leather, fur', meaning a book, having pages of goat parchment used along with papyrus as paper in Ancient Greece, borrowed into Arabic as دفتر: daftar, meaning a register or a notebook.

== Description ==
The information collected could vary, but tahrir defterleri typically included details of villages, dwellings, household heads (adult males and widows), ethnicity/religion (because these could affect tax liabilities/exemptions), and land use. The defter-i hakâni was a land registry, also used for tax purposes. Each town had a defter and typically an officiator or someone in an administrative role to determine whether the information should be recorded. The officiator was usually some kind of learned man who had knowledge of state regulations. The defter was used to record family interactions such as marriage and inheritance. These records are useful for historians because such information allows for a more in-depth understanding of land ownership among Ottomans. This is particularly helpful when attempting to study the daily affairs of Ottoman citizens.

Some Ottoman officials responsible for these tax registries were known as defterdars.

== Daftars in India ==
Records of this kind are known as daftars in Northern India as well, for instance the Peshwa's daftar of Pune.
