= Ekmekcioğlu Caravanserai =

Ekmekcioğlu Ahmed Pasha Caravanserai
- Ekmekcioğlu Ahmed Paşa Kervansarayı
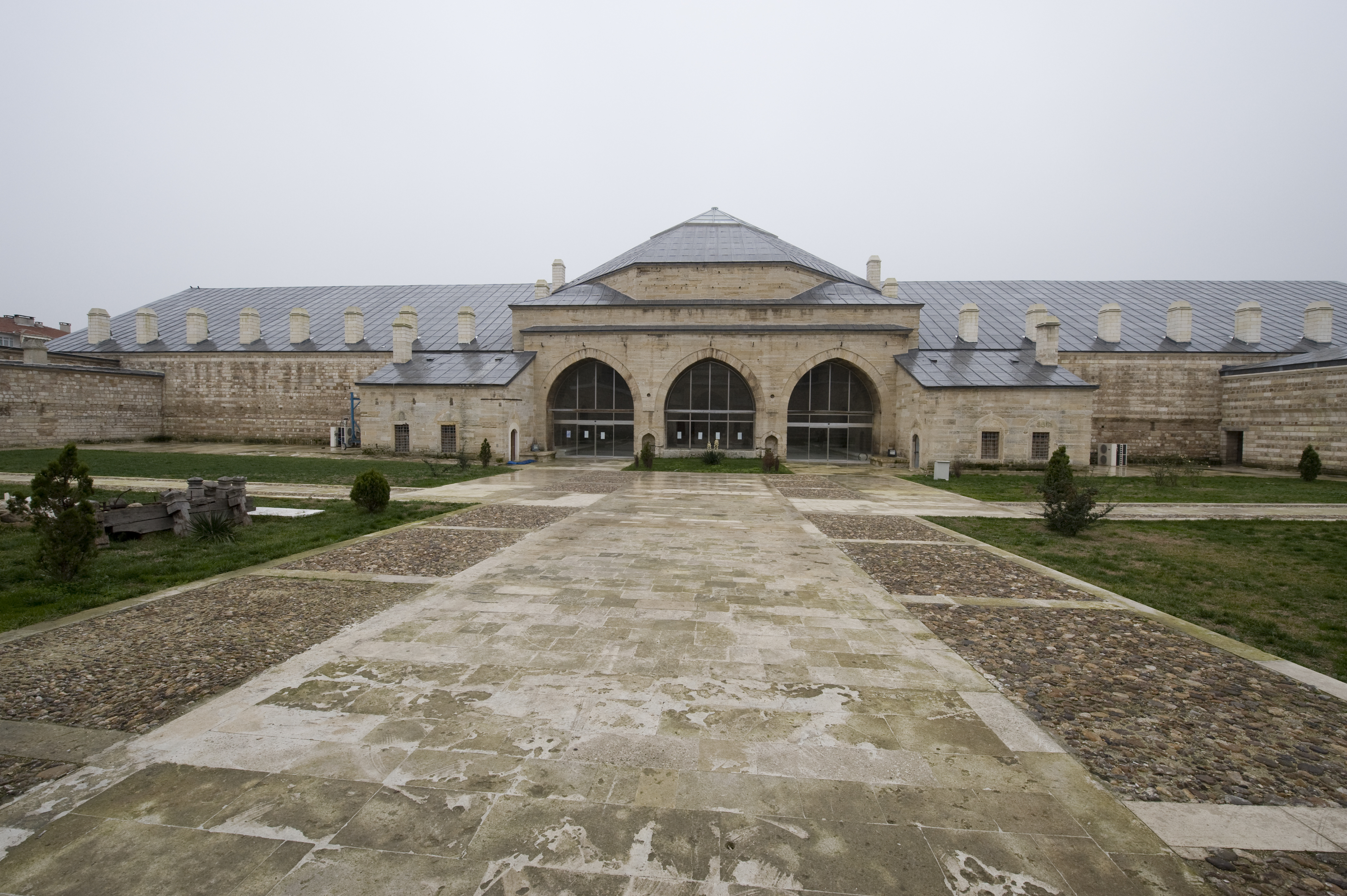
- Interactive map of the Ekmekcioğlu Ahmed Pasha Caravanserai area
- Alternative names: Ekmekçizâde Ahmed Paşa Kervansarayı; Ayşekadın Kervansarayı; Küpeli Han; Deve Hanı

General information
- Type: Caravanserai
- Architectural style: Ottoman architecture
- Location: Edirne, Turkey
- Coordinates: 41.6708°N 26.5628°E
- Completed: 1610; 416 years ago
- Renovated: 2004-2008
- Client: Ekmekcioğlu Ahmed Pasha

Design and construction
- Architect: probably Sedefkar Mehmed Agha

Ekmekcioğlu Ahmed Pasha Caravanserai (Turkish: Ekmekcioğlu Ahmed Paşa Kervansarayı) was a caravanserai located in Edirne (formerly Adrianople in English), northwestern Turkey. It was commissioned by Ottoman statesman and Defterdar (Minister of Finance) Ekmekcioğlu Ahmed Pasha in honour of Sultan Ahmed I, on the site of the earlier and smaller Ayşe Kadın Caravanserai. It is locally also called Küpeli Han ("Earring Inn"), because of a design feature on the entrance, and Deve Hanı ("Camel Inn") because the gates were tall enough to admit camels.

The structure, completed in 1610, was built on an unusually large scale for a wayside inn and was probably designed by Sedefkar Mehmed Agha. The main building of the caravanserai is of the double-wing type, with a central entrance hall flanked by two larger halls. There were also smaller rooms and buildings around the courtyard, the entrance to which was set in a row of twenty shops. The structure was primarily built in limestone with lead roofs and domes.

Notable visitors to the caravanserai include Jakab Nagy de Harsány, Giovanni Benaglia and Evliya Çelebi.

The caravanserai fell out of use at some point in the late 18th or early 19th century, and was later used in whole or in part as a cavalry stable, a hospital, and a post office depot. The structure was partially restored in 2004-2008 through Turkish-Bulgarian cooperation, co-financed by the EU, and is now used for events and exhibitions. As of 2019, further restoration work was still ongoing.

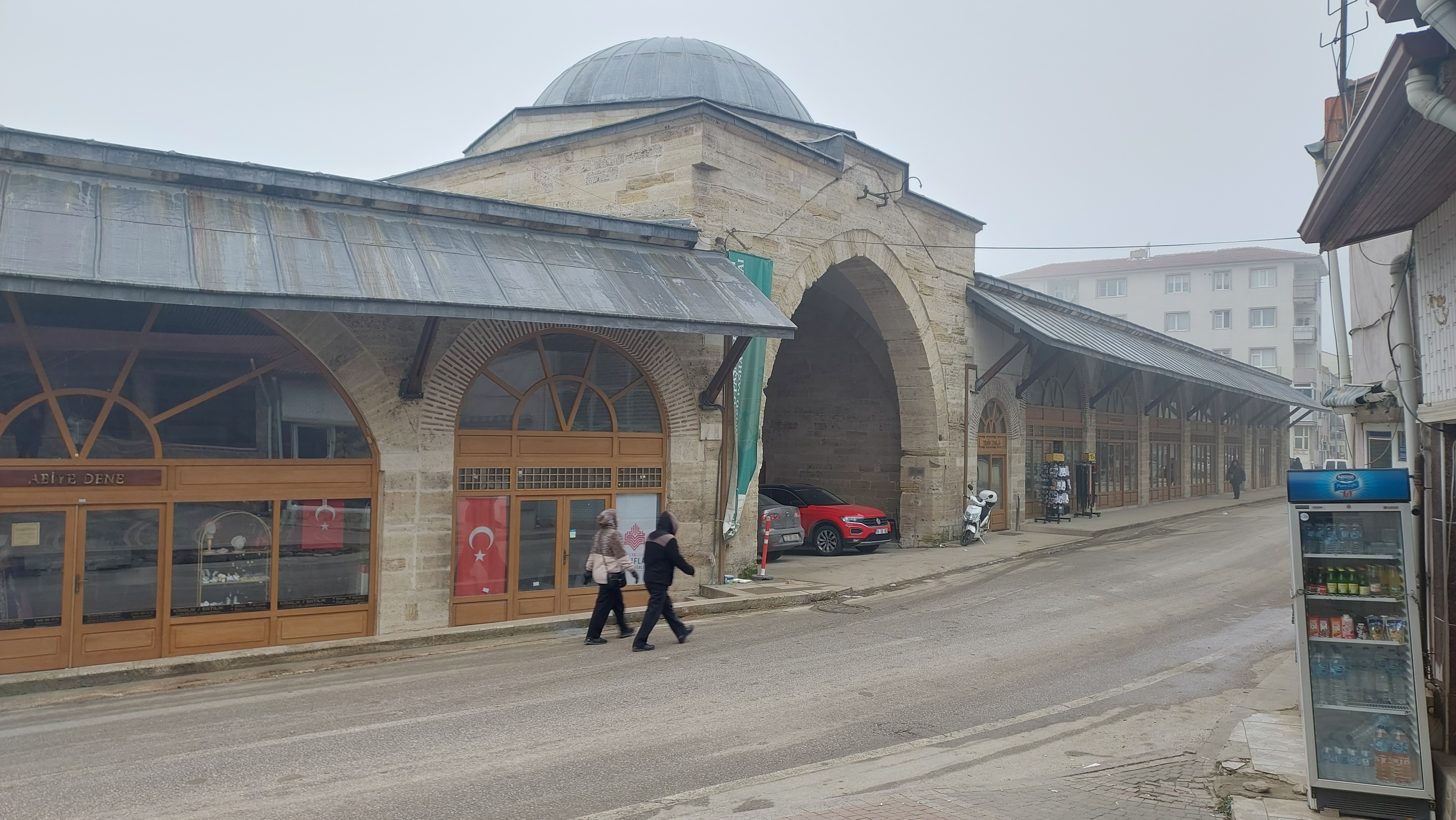
Entrance to the courtyard through a row of shops
