= Ismail Pasha (Tripolitanian) =

Georgian-born Ottoman statesman

Ismail Pasha (fl. 1780–1792) was an Ottoman statesman of Georgian origin, he grew up in Tunis during the reign of Ali Pasha (1759-1782). Because of this, he became the kethüda (assistant/deputy) of Cezayirli Gazi Hasan Pasha, the famous Kapudan Pasha. He would go on to serve as the Ottoman governor of Egypt Eyalet (1788–89, 1789–91) and Morea Eyalet (1791–92).

== Governorship of Egypt ==
When Cezayirli Gazi Hasan Pasha was ordered by the sultan Abdülhamid I to take troops to Egypt and drive out the Mamluk emirs led by Ibrahim Bey (Mamluk) and Murad Bey, who had become de facto rulers of the province, Ismail Pasha went with him. When Hasan Pasha completed the removal (at least temporarily) and departed, he left Ismail Pasha behind in Egypt. Ismail Pasha then received the news that he was appointed the Ottoman governor of Egypt on 2 December 1788.

When the Mamluk emirs, who had secured a negotiation with Ismail Pasha's predecessor Keki Abdi Pasha as to their power and holdings in Egypt, found that he had been replaced by Ismail Pasha, they refused to honor the deal. Abdi Pasha, angry over his dismissal and this turn of events, sent agents to Istanbul, the capital, to persuade the sultan to reappoint him as governor. This was successful, and within a month, on 3 January 1789, news arrived that Abdi Pasha had been reappointed the governor of Egypt and Ismail Pasha had been dismissed.

However, less than a month later, on 30 January 1789, messengers from Istanbul appeared carrying an order for the re-dismissal of Abdi Pasha and the reappointment of Ismail Pasha, this being the result of the persuasions of Ismail Pasha's former employee and friend Cezayirli Gazi Hasan Pasha, who had undone what Abdi Pasha's agents had done to have him dismissed.

In the beginning of his second term, news arrived from Istanbul that the Ottoman Empire had had a brief victory in the Russo-Turkish War (1787–92) when they overran the Banat region previously taken by the Russians (although the Ottomans would go on to lose the war), ordering a day of celebration in Cairo. Ismail Pasha then proceeded to whitewash and clean the walls of Al-Azhar University, among other things. News also arrived that sultan Abdülhamid I had died on April 7, being replaced by Selim III, and that Ismail Pasha's former employee Cezayirli Gazi Hasan Pasha had been dismissed from the post of Kapudan Pasha after holding the office for 20 years. At one point, Ismail Pasha became very angry with a man named Abdul Wahhab Efendi the Bosnian, and hearing of his derisions of him, slapped him in the face and plucked his beard before his ministers pulled him away.

In early 1791, an extremely deadly plague ravaged Egypt, killing many of all ages including Ismail Bey al-Kabir, the favored Mamluk emir at the time. After his death, other Mamluk emirs competed over who would take leadership of the emirs. Mass graves were dug for the dead.

In the first few days of May 1791, a message arrived from Istanbul, dismissing Ismail Pasha from the governorship and replacing him with Safranbolulu Izzet Mehmet Pasha. Ismail Pasha was told to report to Morea Eyalet (modern Peloponnese peninsula, Greece), of which he was now appointed as governor. The Mamluk emirs complained that Ismail Pasha, who was familiar to them, was being replaced by a stranger and asked him to send a petition to remain governor of Egypt. Ismail Pasha refused and hastily began packing his belongings for departure. The emirs grew suspicious that he was hurrying because of unpaid debts to the treasury and forced him to remain in Egypt until the new governor Safranbolulu Izzet Mehmet Pasha could arrive and audit him. They put him under house arrest, and when the new governor arrived and Ismail Pasha paid what he owed, he finally left on a ship for Morea on 26 June 1791.

== Governorship of Morea and death ==
After arriving in Morea sometime in late summer 1791, Ismail Pasha was dismissed from this post later that year or the next (1792), and his viziership was revoked. He shipped his possessions to Tunis and foreign lands and was placed under house arrest. After being freed, he moved to Tuscany in Italy. Although the Austrian government helped to have his viziership and status as a civil servant returned, Ismail Pasha remained in Tuscany and died there.

== See also ==
- List of Ottoman governors of Egypt

Political offices
Preceded by Keki Abdi Pasha	Ottoman Governor of Egypt; 1788–1789	Succeeded by Keki Abdi Pasha
Preceded by Keki Abdi Pasha	Ottoman Governor of Egypt; 1789–1791	Succeeded by Safranbolulu Izzet Mehmet Pasha
