= Hadım Hafız Ahmed Pasha =

Ottoman statesman

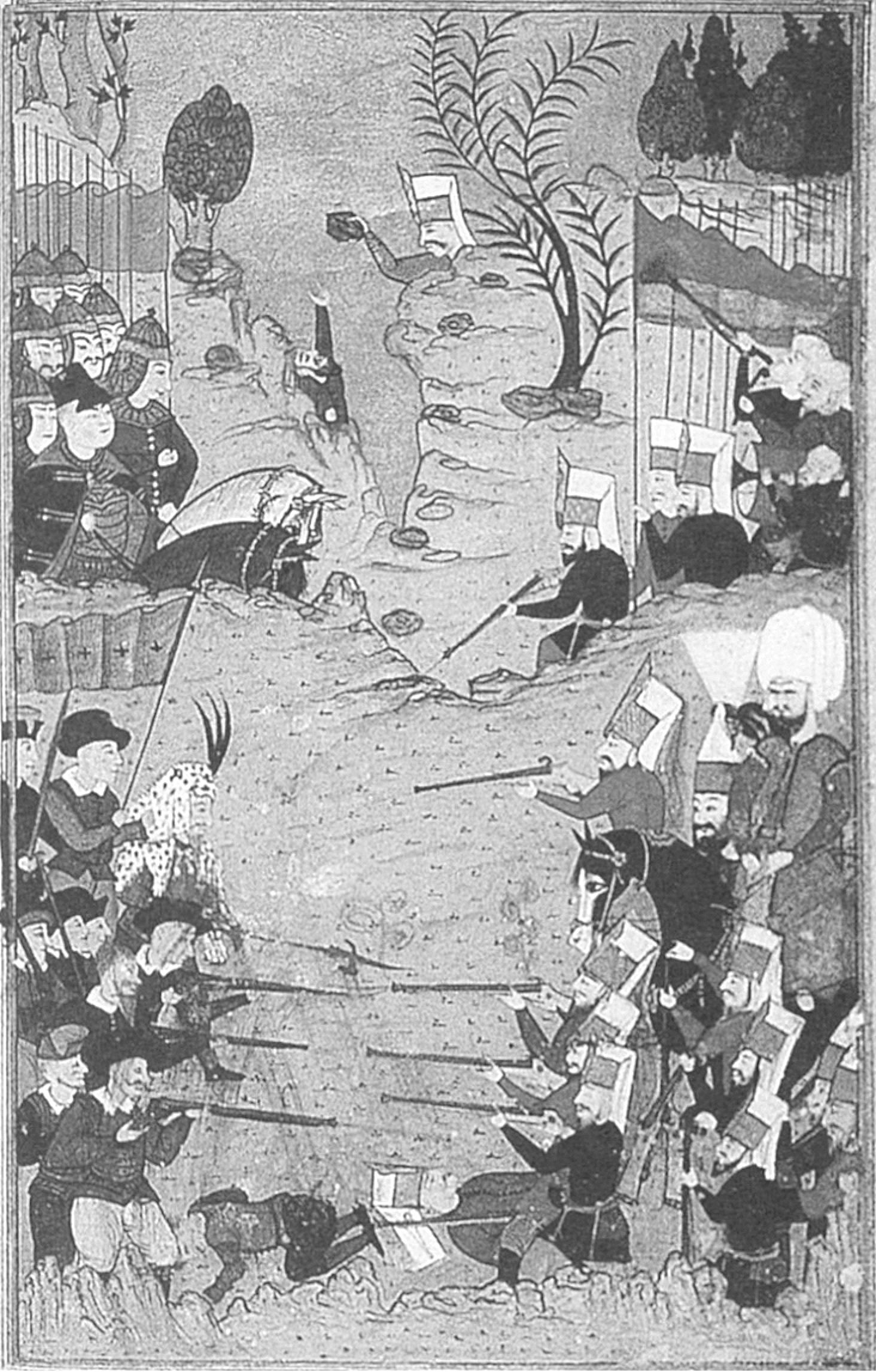
Battle of Hadim Hafiz Pasha at Nigbolu. Nadiri's Diwan, ca. 1605. Topkapi Ralace Museum Library, H.889

Hadım Hafız Ahmed Pasha (usually referred to as Hafız Ahmed Pasha; died November 3, 1613) was an Ottoman Albanian statesman who served as the governor of Egypt from 1590 or 1591 to 1594. Previously, he had served as governor (beylerbey) of Cyprus, and he became a vizier along with his appointment to Egypt. After Egypt, he became the governor of Bursa from 1594 to 1595. His epithet Hadım means "eunuch" in Turkish.

He commanded the victorious Ottoman forces during sultan Mehmed III's siege of Eger in 1606. After a string of various government and military roles, Ahmed Pasha retired in 1607 or 1608. He died on November 3, 1613.

== See also ==
- List of Ottoman governors of Egypt

Political offices
Preceded by Kara Üveys Pasha	Ottoman Governor of Egypt; 1590–1594	Succeeded by Kurd Mehmed Pasha
