= Kayserili Hacı Salih Pasha =

Ottoman statesman (died 1801/2)

Ottoman Governor of Trebizond
- In office 1799 – 1801 or 1802

Ottoman Governor of Diyarbekir
- In office 1796–1799

Ottoman Governor of Egypt
- In office 15 October 1794 – 7 June 1796
- Preceded by: Safranbolulu Izzet Mehmet Pasha
- Succeeded by: Lokmacı Hacı Ebubekir Pasha

Ottoman Governor of Bosnia
- In office 1789–1790
- Preceded by: Mirialem Ebubekir Pasha
- Succeeded by: Koca Yusuf Pasha
- In office 1791–1792
- Preceded by: Koca Yusuf Pasha
- Succeeded by: Mirialem Ebubekir Pasha

Personal details
- Born: Kayseri, Ottoman Empire
- Died: 1801 or 1802 Trabzon, Ottoman Empire
- Children: Hacı Mehmed Emin Bey

Kayserili Hacı Salih Pasha (died 1801 or 1802, Trabzon) was an Ottoman statesman, originally from the city of Kayseri in central Anatolia. He served as the Ottoman governor of Bosnia (1789–90 and 1791–92), Egypt (15 October 1794 – 7 June 1796), Diyarbekir (1796–99), and Trebizond (1799–1801 or 1802), dying in 1801 or 1802.

== See also ==
- List of Ottoman governors of Bosnia
- List of Ottoman governors of Egypt

Political offices
Preceded by Mirialem Ebubekir Pasha	Ottoman Governor of Bosnia; 1789–1790	Succeeded by Koca Yusuf Pasha
Preceded by Koca Yusuf Pasha	Ottoman Governor of Bosnia; 1791–1792	Succeeded by Mirialem Ebubekir Pasha
Preceded by Safranbolulu Izzet Mehmet Pasha	Ottoman Governor of Egypt; 15 October 1794 – 7 June 1796	Succeeded by Lokmacı Hacı Ebubekir Pasha
Preceded by	Ottoman Governor of Diyarbekir; 1791–1792	Succeeded by
Preceded by	Ottoman Governor of Trebizond; 1791–1792	Succeeded by
