= Keki Abdi Pasha =

Ottoman statesman (died 1789)

Kapıcıbaşı of the Ottoman Sultan

Sanjak-bey of İçel
- In office 1779–1780
- Monarch: Abdul Hamid I
- In office 1781–1782
- Monarch: Abdul Hamid I

Governor of the Adana Eyalet
- In office 1780–1781
- Monarch: Abdul Hamid I

Governor of the Diyarbekir Eyalet
- In office 1782–1784
- Monarch: Abdul Hamid I
- In office 1785–1785
- Monarch: Abdul Hamid I
- In office 1786–1786
- Monarch: Abdul Hamid I

Governor of the Aleppo Eyalet
- In office 1784–1784
- Monarch: Abdul Hamid I

Governor of the Rakka Eyalet
- In office 1784–1785
- Monarch: Abdul Hamid I

Governor of the Sivas Eyalet
- In office 1785–1786
- Monarch: Abdul Hamid I

Governor of the Egypt Eyalet
- In office 30 April 1787 – 2 December 1788
- Monarch: Abdul Hamid I
- Preceded by: Yeğen Seyyid Mehmed Pasha (as Ottoman governor); Cezayirli Gazi Hasan Pasha (as de facto ruler)
- Succeeded by: Ismail Pasha (Tripolitanian)
- In office 3 January 1789 – 30 January 1789
- Monarch: Abdul Hamid I
- Preceded by: Ismail Pasha (Tripolitanian)
- Succeeded by: Ismail Pasha (Tripolitanian)

Vizier of the Ottoman Empire
- In office 1782 – April 1789
- Monarch: Abdul Hamid I

Personal details
- Died: April 1789 Aleppo, Aleppo Sanjak, Aleppo Eyalet, Ottoman Empire

Keki Abdi Pasha (sometimes spelled 'Abidi; died April 1789, Aleppo) was an Ottoman statesman. He served as the governor of the Sanjak of İçel (1779–80, 1781–82), Adana Eyalet (1780–81), Diyarbekir Eyalet (1782–84, 1785, 1786), Aleppo Eyalet (1784), Rakka Eyalet (1784–85), Sivas Eyalet (1785–86), and Egypt Eyalet (1787–88, 1789).

== Background ==
Earlier in his career, he served as kapıcıbaşı (master of ceremonies) for the Ottoman sultan. He became a vizier in 1782.

== Governorship of Aleppo ==
Abdi Pasha was appointed as the governor of Aleppo Eyalet by the sultan in 1784. Upon taking office, his militias killed several Janissaries. He then had the leaders of Aleppo's Christian communities arrested and ordered them to wear special clothing, only reversing this upon receiving a heavy fee from them. The local Janissaries began to fight back and barricaded Abdi Pasha in the governor's palace, which he was only able to leave through the mediation of his kadı (judge). He was then expelled from Aleppo, going to Rakka (modern Raqqa, Syria), where he soon became governor. Aleppo would remain without a governor for just over a year after his expulsion.

== Campaign in Egypt ==
In 1786, while Abdi Pasha was the governor of Diyarbekir Eyalet, the Kapudan Pasha (grand admiral of the Ottoman Navy) Cezayirli Gazi Hasan Pasha was ordered by the sultan Abdülhamid I to take troops to Egypt and drive out the Mamluk emirs led by Ibrahim Bey (Mamluk) and Murad Bey, who had become de facto rulers of the province, frequently deposing the Ottoman governors at their pleasure.

As grand admiral Hasan Pasha moved towards Egypt, Abdi Pasha and his troops joined him. While waiting for the emirs to appear in order to engage them in battle on 24 October 1786, the news reached Abdi Pasha that the sultan had appointed him to be the governor of Egypt. However, Abdi Pasha wished to continue commanding his troops, so he told grand admiral Hasan Pasha that he could not take office until the Mamluks had been defeated and set out with his army to find them, leaving Hasan Pasha to continue being the de facto governor. Soon, his troops located the Mamluk emirs and defeated them in battle, causing celebration in Egypt.

== Governorship of Egypt ==
After the Mamluk emirs were defeated, which would prove to be temporary, Abdi Pasha entered the Cairo Citadel and took office as governor of Egypt on 30 April 1787 while the pro-Ottoman Mamluk Emir Ismail Bey became Shaykh al-Balad (civil governor) and de facto ruler.

On 2 December 1788, a courier arrived from Istanbul, the Ottoman capital, that Abdi Pasha had been replaced as governor by Ismail Pasha the Tripolitanian, the former kethüda (deputy or assistant) of Kapudan Pasha Cezayirli Gazi Hasan Pasha. When the Mamluk emirs, who had secured a negotiation with Abdi Pasha as to their power, found out that he had been replaced by Ismail Pasha, they refused to honor the deal. Abdi Pasha, angry over his dismissal and this turn of events, sent agents to Istanbul to persuade the sultan to reappoint him as governor. This was successful, and within a month, on 3 January 1789, news arrived that Abdi Pasha had been reappointed the governor of Egypt and that he should drive the Mamluk emirs out of southern (Upper) Egypt.

However, less than a month later, on 30 January 1789, messengers from Istanbul appeared carrying an order for the re-dismissal of Abdi Pasha and the reappointment of Ismail Pasha, this being the result of the persuasions of Cezayirli Gazi Hasan Pasha, Ismail Pasha's former superior and friend, who had undone what Abdi Pasha's agents had done to have him reappointed. Now governor again, Ismail Pasha had Abdi Pasha's accounts audited and found that he owed money to the provincial treasury, which Abdi Pasha negotiated to half of the original amount. He paid the sum and prepared to leave Cairo.

Abdi Pasha left Egypt on 30 March 1789, headed for Diyarbekir (modern Diyarbakır), in order to gather troops to fight against the Russian Empire in the Russo-Turkish War (1787–92).

== Death ==
After gathering troops for the war with Russia, he traveled to Aleppo that same month (March) and died there in April.

== See also ==
- List of Ottoman governors of Egypt
- List of rulers of Aleppo

Political offices
Preceded by Cezayirli Gazi Hasan Pasha as acting Governor	Ottoman Governor of Egypt; 1787–1788	Succeeded by Ismail Pasha the Tripolitanian
Preceded by Ismail Pasha the Tripolitanian	Ottoman Governor of Egypt; 1789	Succeeded by Ismail Pasha the Tripolitanian
