= İzzet Mehmet Pasha Mosque =

Mosque in Safranbolu, Karabük, Turkey

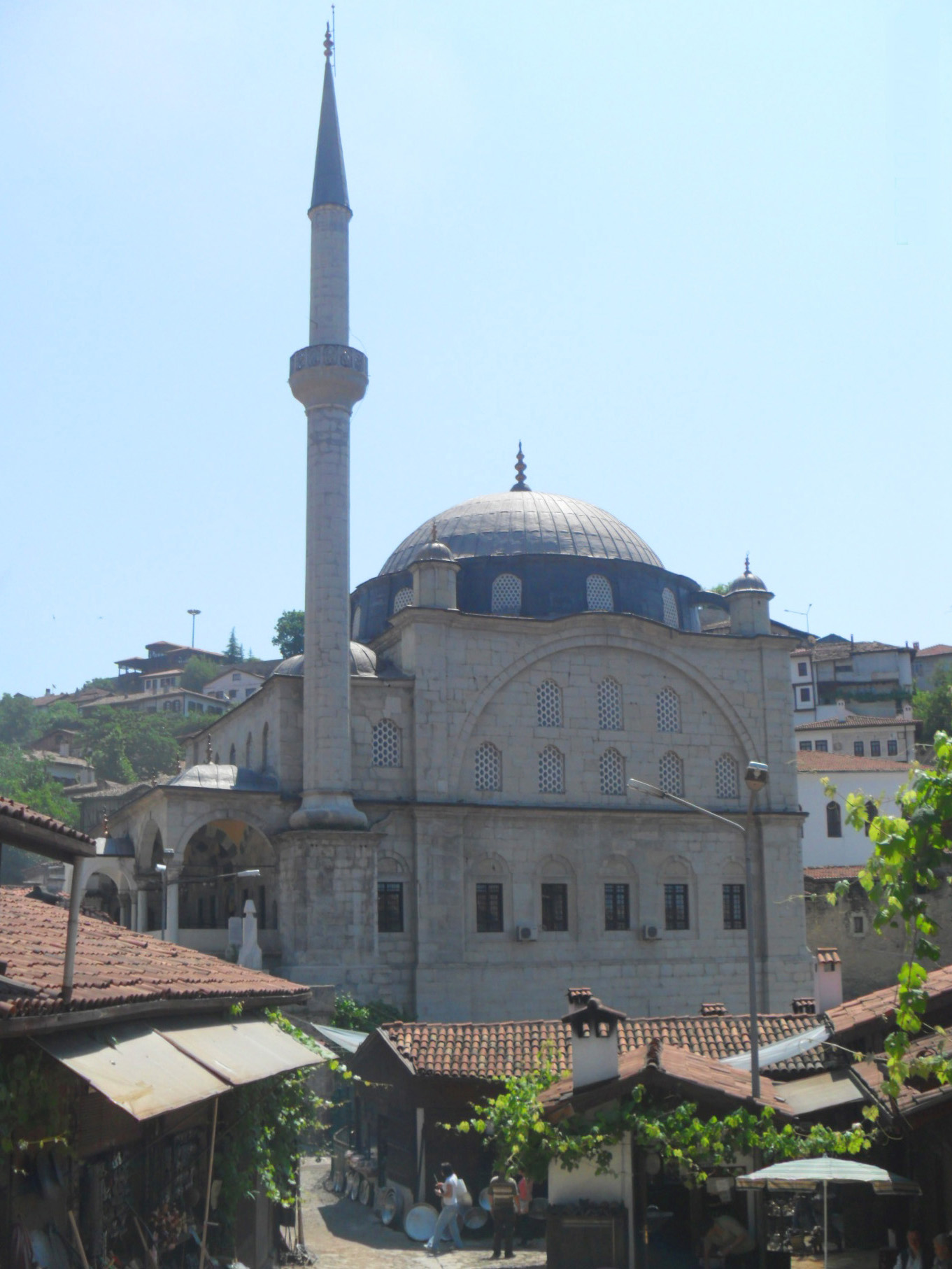

Religion
- Affiliation: Islam
- Branch/tradition: Sunni

Location
- Location: Safranbolu, Karabük, Black Sea Region, Turkey
- Interactive map of İzzet Mehmet Pasha Mosque
- Coordinates: 41°14′54″N 32°41′09″E

Architecture
- Type: Mosque
- Style: Ottoman
- Groundbreaking: 1794
- Completed: 1798
- Minaret: 1

İzzet Mehmet Pasha Mosque is an 18th-century mosque in Safranbolu of Karabük Province, Turkey.

== Geography ==
The mosque is in the market place of Safranbolu at 41°15′N 32°41′E. The street in front of the mosque is Adnan Menderes street which connects Safranbolu to nearby Karabük. The mosque is a part of the historic places of the city which are included in the List of World Heritage Sites in Turkey.

== History ==
The mosque had been commissioned by Safranbolulu Izzet Mehmet Pasha, who was born in Safranbolu. İzzet Mehmet Pasha was a grand vizier of the Ottoman Empire twice during the reign of Abdul Hamid I, and once during the reign of Selim III. The mosque was constructed between 1794-1798 during his last service.

== The building ==
The one minaret mosque can be considered as a small külliye (complex) with several vakıf (foundation) shops a library and two fountains. The base area of the mosque is inclined ground. More over there is an underground creek beneath the building. The problem had been solved by elevating the floor of the building and placing it on arches. The praying room is square with dimensions 13.5 x 13.5 m^{2}. (44.4 x 44.4 ft^{2} ). Both the mimbar and the mihrab are luxuriously decorated. There is a tughra of Selim III on the mimbar. The general appearance of the mosque resembles that of Nuruosmaniye Mosque in Istanbul, built in 1750s.

== Gallery ==
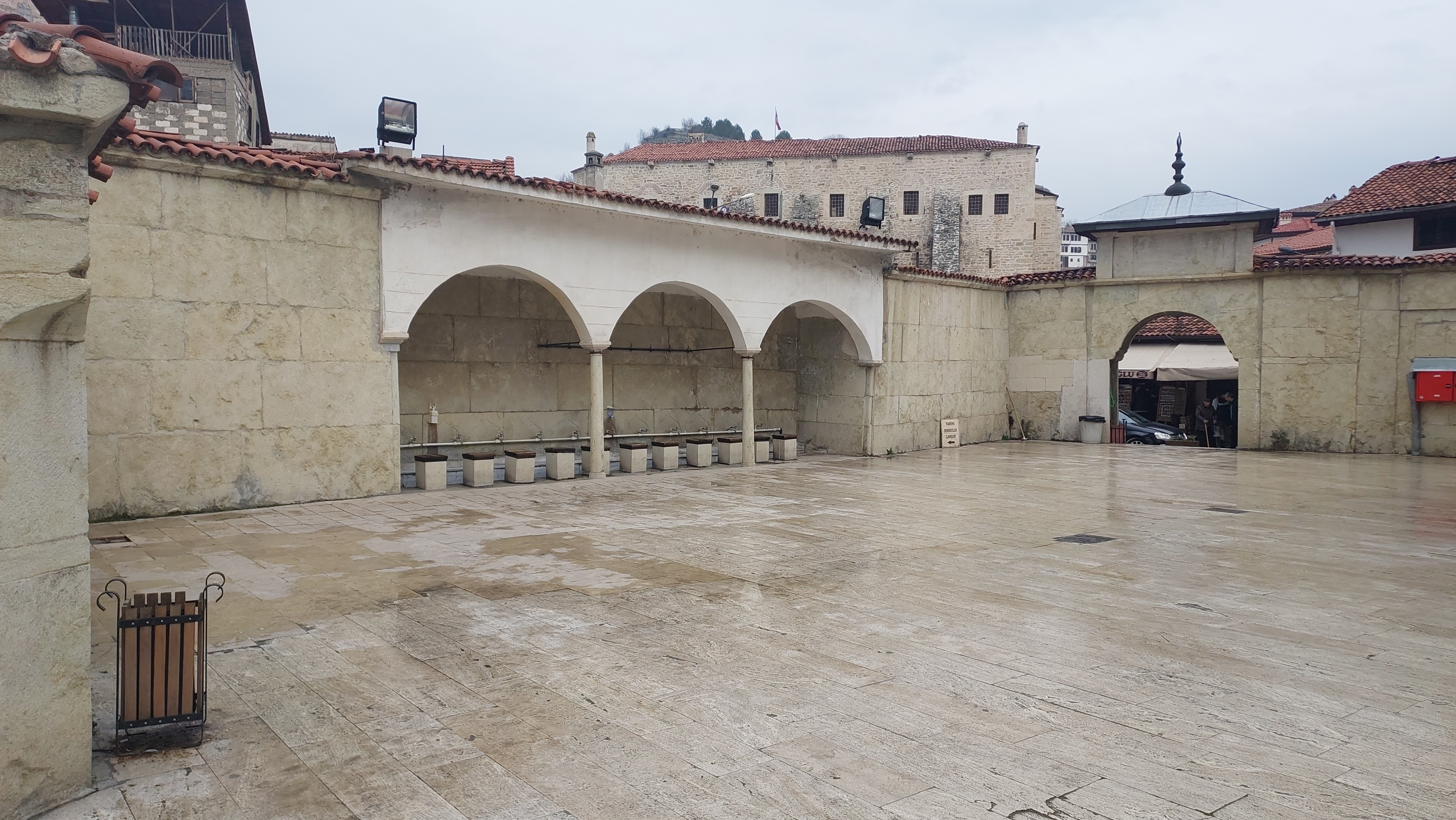

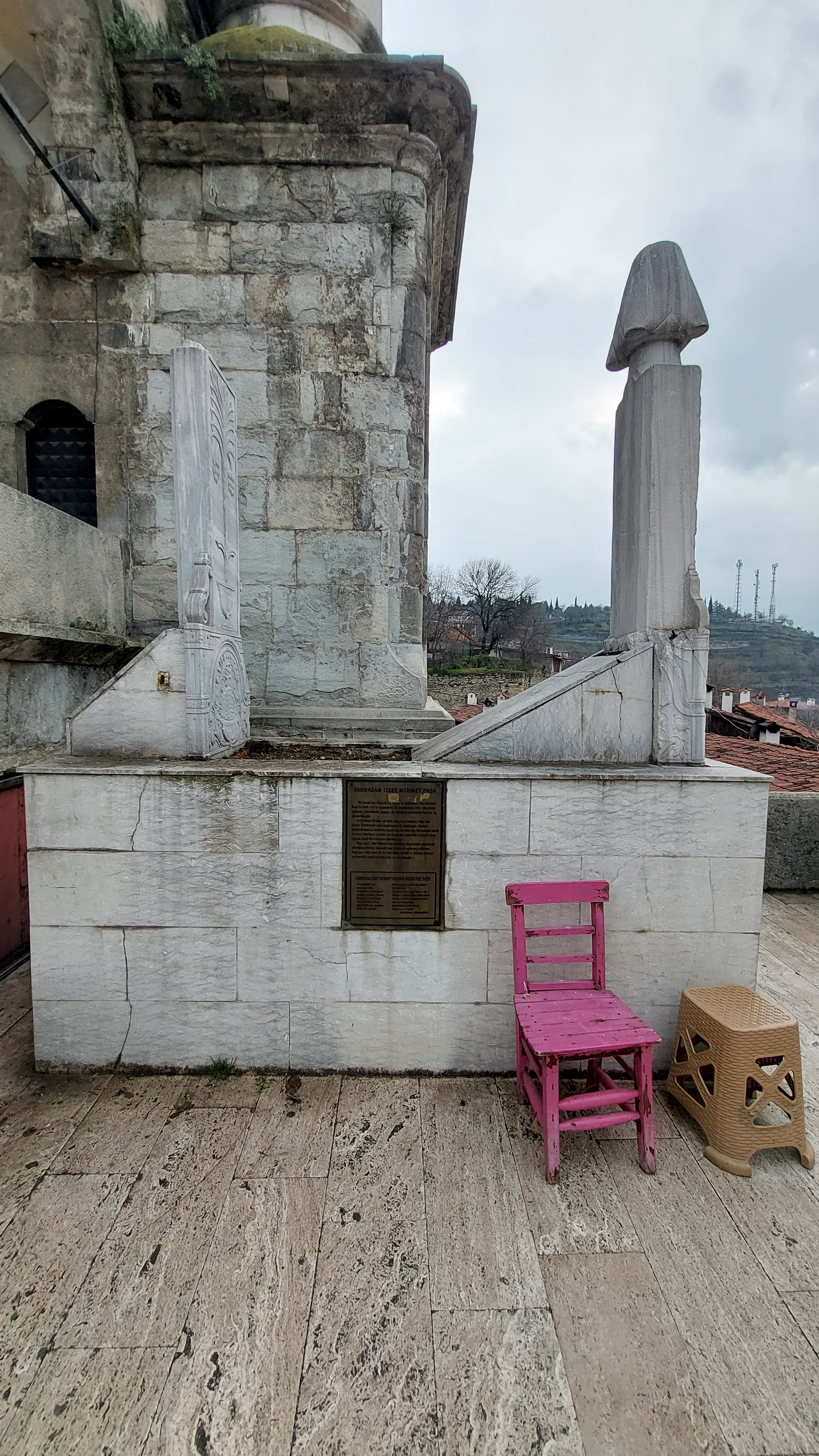

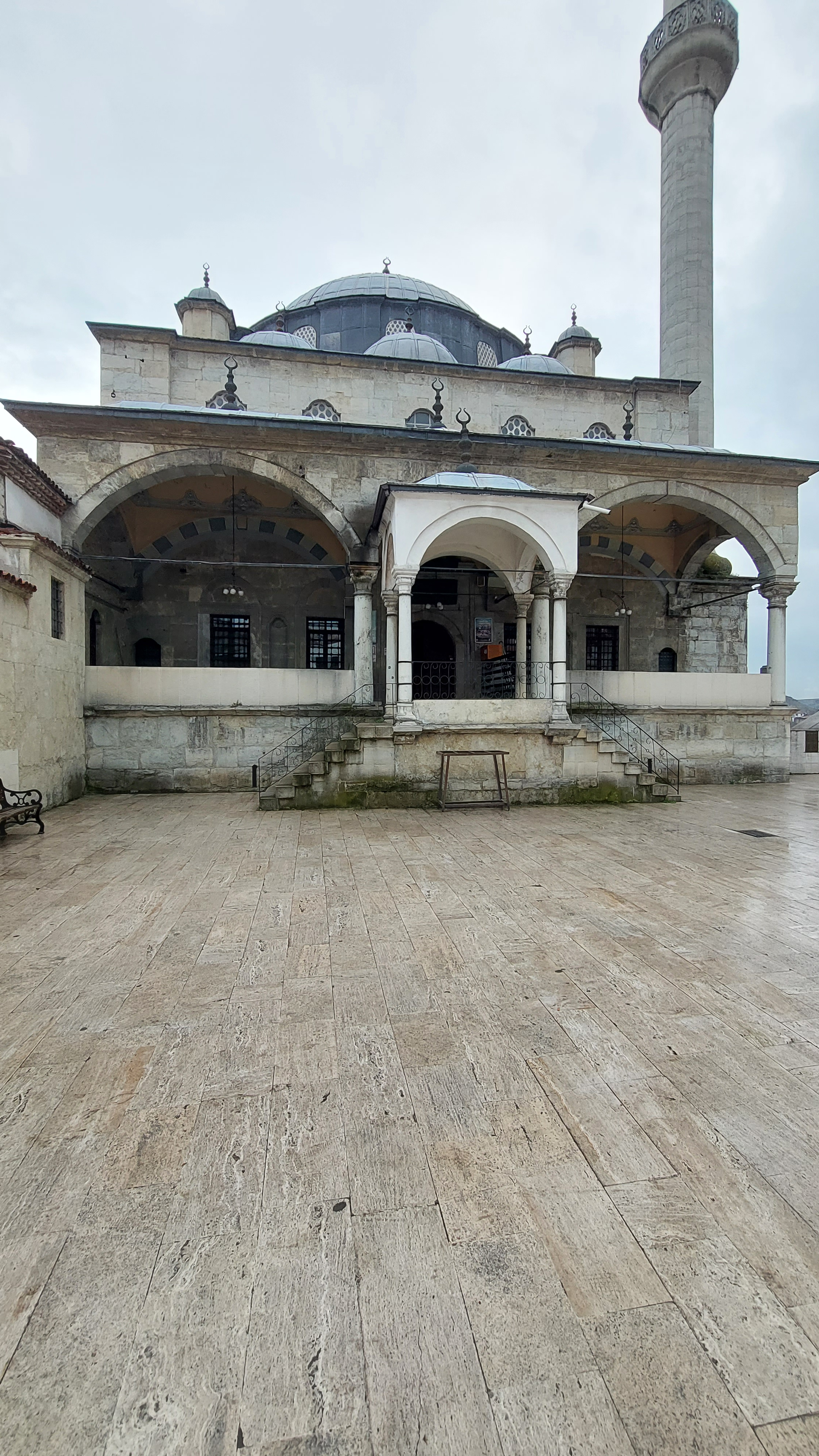

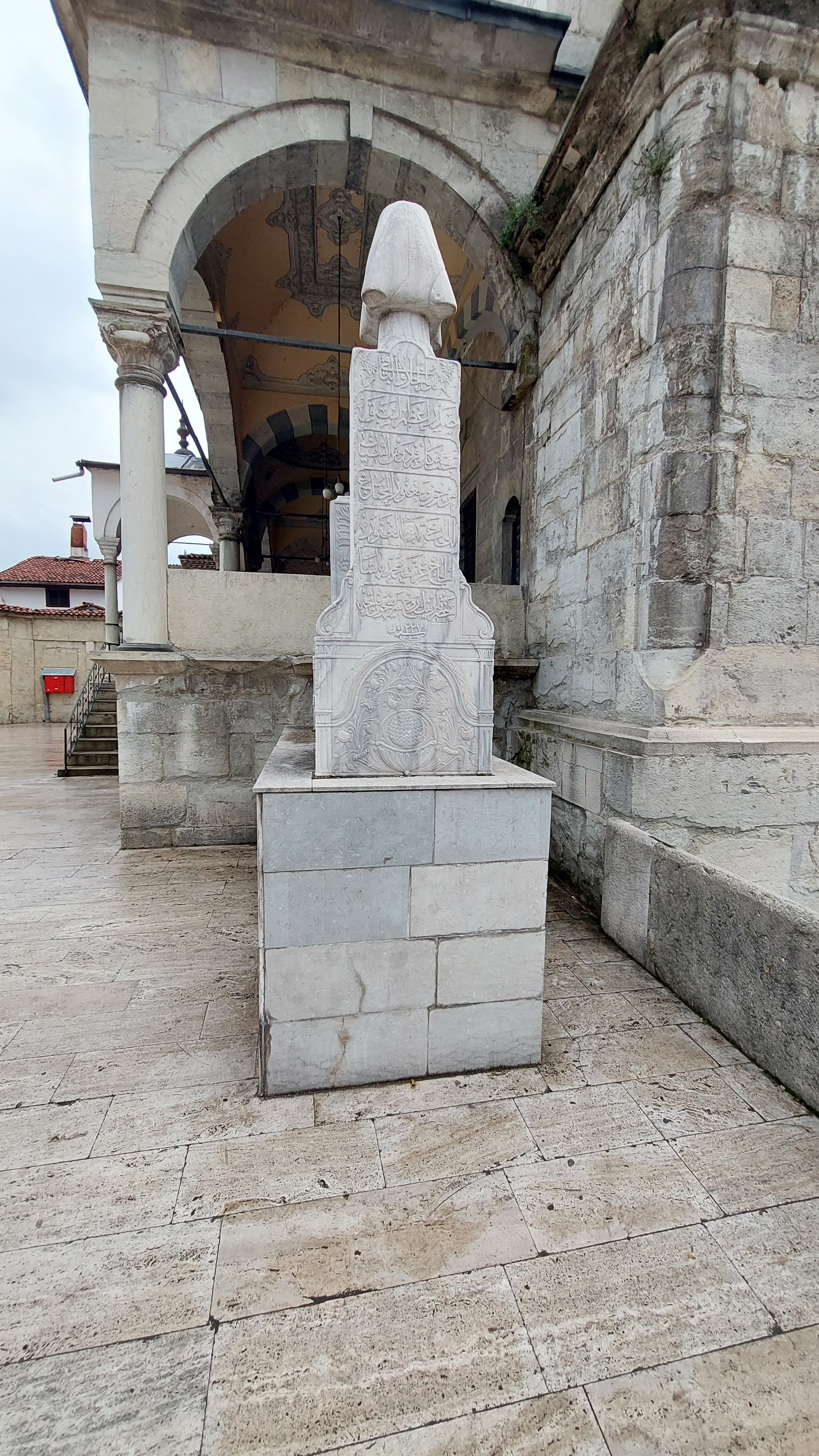
