= Seyyid Emir Mehmed Pasha =

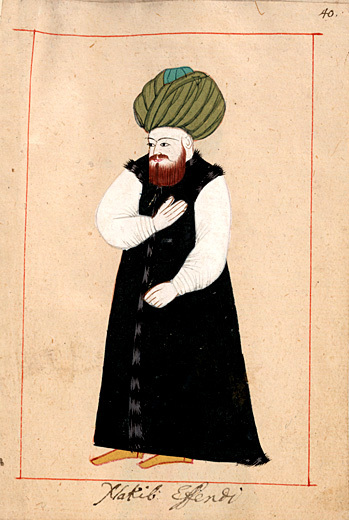
In the Ottoman Empire, Muhammad's descendants formed a kind of nobility with the privilege of wearing green turbans.

Seyyid Emir Mehmed Pasha (Turkish: Şerif/Seyyid/Emir Mehmed Paşa), known by the epithet "al-Sharif" among his Arab subjects, was an Ottoman statesman who served as defterdar (finance minister) (1589–1593, 1595), Ottoman governor of Egypt (1596–1598), and Ottoman governor of Damascus (1599–1600).

He was a descendant of Hussein ibn Ali, earning him the epithet "sayyid." While he was the governor of Egypt (with the title beylerbey, often known as viceroy), he was reportedly a frequent visitor of the Al-Hussein Mosque in Cairo. In 1599, he became a vizier.

== See also ==
- List of Ottoman ministers of finance
- List of Ottoman governors of Egypt
- List of Ottoman governors of Damascus

Political offices
Preceded by	Defterdar; 1589–1593	Succeeded by
Preceded by Kurd Mehmed Pasha	Ottoman Governor of Egypt; 1594–1595	Succeeded by Hızır Pasha
Preceded by	Defterdar; 1595	Succeeded by
Preceded by	Ottoman Governor of Damascus; 1599–1600	Succeeded by
