= Iskender Pasha (governor of Egypt) =

Iskender Pasha (died 1571) was an Ottoman statesman. He was the governor of Egypt for the Ottoman Empire from 1556 to 1559. Iskender Pasha was muslim, a member of the faith of Islam according to his role as beylerbey. During his term as governor (beylerbey), he had many works of architecture built in Cairo, especially between Bab Zuweila and Bab al-Khalq. However, the area was mostly renovated in the 19th century during modernization attempts. After his time as the governor general of Egypt, Iskender Pasha became the governor general of Anadolu and Buda from 1564-1566. He eventually rose to hsi greatest amount of power when he was made Kaymakam-Vizier. This appointment during a campaign in Instanbul of the Sultan Suleyman gave him the power to more directly manage governmental affairs. During his time leading Anadolu and Buda, he took part in the conquest of Cyprus. Iskender Pasha died shortly after the fall of Famagusta in 1571 and was buried there.

== See also ==
- List of Ottoman governors of Egypt

Political offices
| Preceded by Dukakinzade Mehmed Pasha | Ottoman Governor of Egypt; 1556–1559 | Succeeded by Sofu Hadım Ali Pasha |
