= List of Ottoman ministers of finance =

This is a list of the top officials in charge of the finances of the Ottoman Empire, called defterdar (Turkish for bookkeepers; from the Persian دفتردار daftardâr, دفتر daftar + دار dâr) between the 14th and 19th centuries and Maliye Naziri (Minister of Finance) in the 19th and 20th centuries. They were originally in charge of the defters (tax registers) in the Ottoman Empire, hence the name defterdar.

== History of the office ==
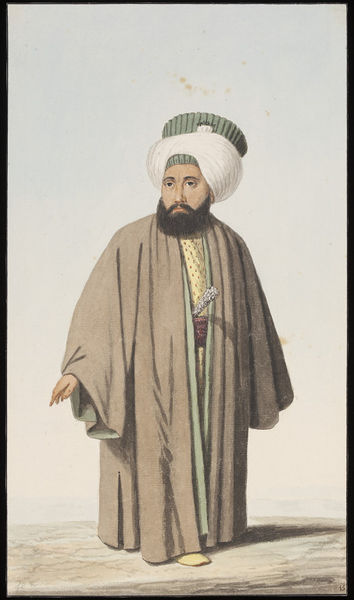
Depiction of a defterdar, anonymous Greek artist, ca. 1809

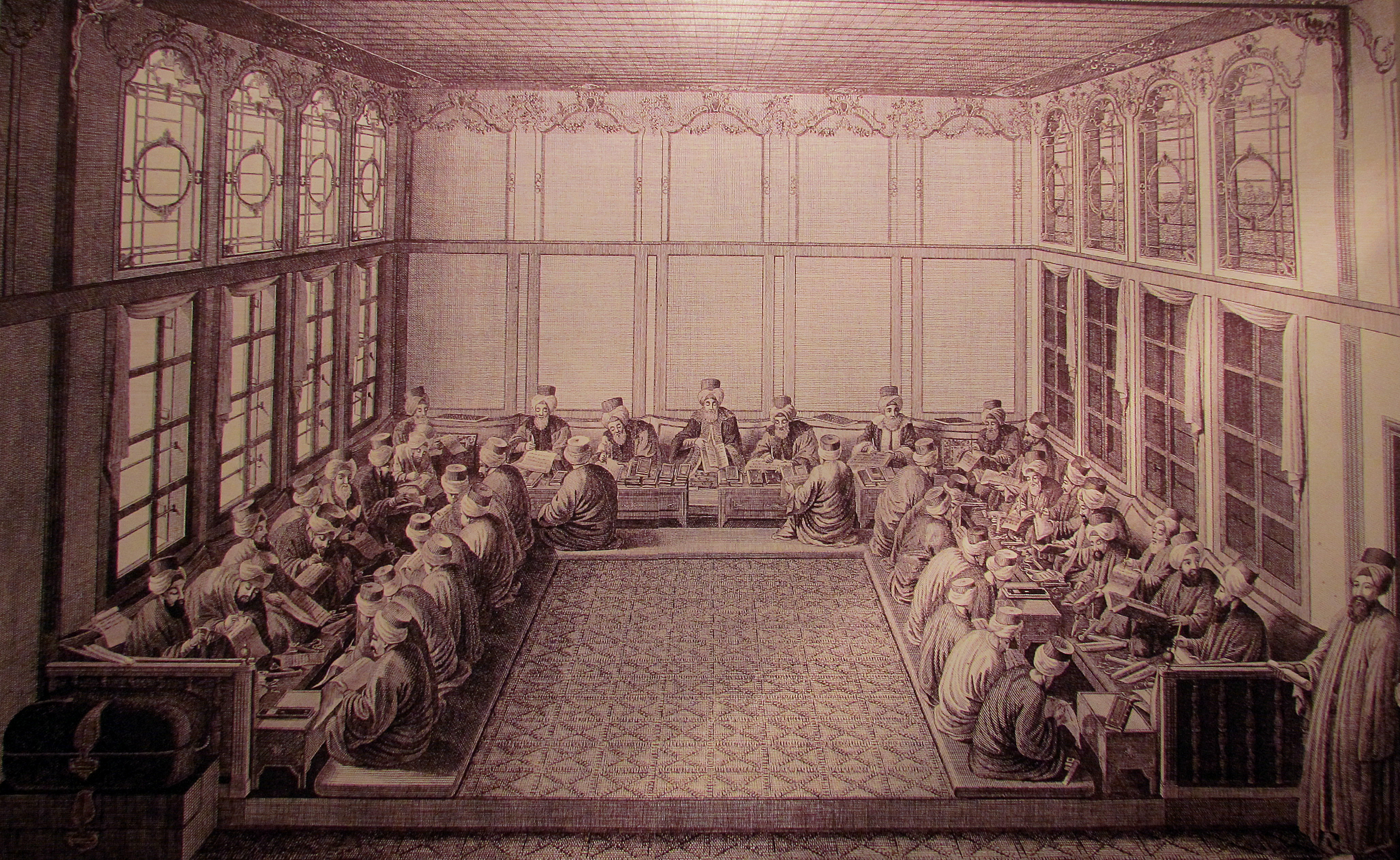
Louis-Nicolas de Lespinasse: Defterdar's office

The exact date of the formal establishment of the office is unknown. According to some sources, the first defterdar was the Kadı (judge) of Mihaliç, Çelebi bin Mehmed, appointed in 1359 or 1360, during the reign of Murad I. During the reign of Bayezid I (1389–1402), the poet Zahiri is mentioned as the defterdar.

In the classical period, the finances of the Empire were organized under a single Defterdar, literally the main bookkeeper, in charge of a single imperial treasury (Hazine-i Amire). Starting in 1793, smaller treasuries independent of the imperial treasury were organized, each with a separate defterdar in charge. In 1837, a modern ministry was founded under the name of Maliye Nezareti, merging most of the independent treasuries back to the Imperial Treasury. In 1840, the merging of the remaining independent treasuries was completed.

== Rank and title ==
Ministers of Finance in the classical period were called Defterdar, were members of the Divan-ı Hümayun and held rank higher than agha (military commander of the central organization, situated in Istanbul) and bey (provincial governor), and lower than vizier and kazasker (chief judge). Starting from 1837, Ministers of Finance were called Maliye Nazırı, held the rank of vizier, and were titled Pasha.

== List of defterdars (until 1837) ==
The office of the Defterdar continued until 1837.

=== Reign of Sultan Mehmed II ===
- Titrek Sinan Çelebi (1452–1459)
- Hekim Yakup Pasha (1459)
- Osman Çelebi (1461)
- Fenarı–zade Ahmed Çelebi (1474–1479)
- Nureddin Hamza Ibn–i Ali Efendi (Leys Çelebi) (1479–1482), 1st term

=== Reign of Sultan Bayezid II ===
- Feylezof–zade Ahmed Çelebi (1482–1485)
- Isa Fakih (1485–1486)
- Nureddin Hamza Ibn–i Ali Efendi (Leys Çelebi) (1486–1492), 2nd term
- Cendereci–zade/Çandarlı Şemseddin (1492–1495)
- Nureddin Hamza Ibn–i Ali Efendi (Leys Çelebi) (1495–1499), 3rd term
- Ahmed Çelebi (1499–1501), 1st term
- Hüseyin Çelebi (1501–1502)
- Taci Bey (1502)
- Nureddin Hamza Ibn–i Ali Efendi (Leys Çelebi) (1502–1504), 4th term
- Cezeri–zade Koca Kasım Safı Pasha (1504), 1st term
- Hüsameddin Çelebi (1511)
- Piri Mehmed Pasha (1511)

=== Reign of Sultan Selim I ===
- Piri Mehmed Çelebi (1512–1520), continued from previous reign
- Şemsi Bey/Pasha (1514–1516)
- Iskender Çelebi (1516–1517)
- Çömlekçi–zade Kemalettin Çelebi (1517–1518)
- Hoca–zade Mehmed Çelebi (1518–1519)
- Abdülkerim–zade Abdülvehhab Hayali Çelebi (1519)
- Cezeri–zade Koca Kasım Safı Pasha (1519), 2nd term
- Ahmed Çelebi (1519–1520), 2nd term

=== Reign of Sultan Suleiman the Magnificent ===
- Ahmed Çelebi (1520–1521), continued from previous reign
- Mehmed Çelebi (1521–1525)
- Abdülselam Çelebi (1525)
- Iskender Çelebi (1525 – March 1535)
- Mustafa Çelebi (1534–1536)
- Ramazan–zade Yeşilce Mehmed Çelebi (1536–1537)
- Nazlı Mahmud Çelebi (1537–1542), 1st term
- Ibrahim Çelebi/Pasha (1542–1544)
- Nazlı Mahmud Çelebi (1544–1546), 2nd term
- Sinan Çelebi Pasha (1546–1548)
- Çivi–zade Abdullah/Abdi Çelebi (1548–1553)
- Lütfi Bey/Çelebi (1553–1556)
- Hasan Çelebi (1556–1557)
- Muytab–zade Ahmed Çelebi (1557)
- Eğri Abdi–zade Mehmed Bey/Çelebi (1557–1561)
- Baba Nakkaş–zade Derviş Çelebi (1561–1562), 1st term
- Murad Çelebi (1562–1566)

=== Reign of Sultan Selim II ===
- Murad Çelebi (1566), continued from previous reign
- Ebu'l–fazl Mehmed Çelebi (1566–1569)
- Baba Nakkaş–zade Derviş Çelebi (1569–1573), 2nd term
- Lale–i izar/Lalezar–zade/Laleli–zade Mehmed Çelebi (1573–1575), 1st term

=== Reign of Murad III ===
- Kara Üveys Pasha (1575–1578), 1st term
- Lale–i izar/Lalezar–zade/Laleli–zade Mehmed Çelebi (1578–1581), 2nd term
- Kara Üveys Pasha (1581–1582), 2nd term
- Okçu–zade Mehmed Pasha (1582)
- Maktul Hacı Ibrahim Pasha (1582–1583), 1st term
- Mahmud Efendi/Çelebi (1583–1585), 1st term
- Hüsrev Bey (1585)
- Burhaneddin Efendi/Pasha (1585–1586), 1st term
- Kara Üveys Pasha (1586–1587), 3rd term
- Ramazan Efendi/Pasha (1587), 1st term
- Maktul Hacı Ibrahim Pasha (1587–1588), 2nd term
- Ramazan Efendi/Pasha (1588), 2nd term
- Mahmud Efendi/Çelebi (1588–1589), 2nd term
- Emir Mehmed Pasha (1589–1593), 1st term
- Maktul Hacı Ibrahim Pasha (1593–1594), 3rd term
- Nuh Pasha (1594–1595)

=== Reign of Sultan Mehmed III ===
- Baş–Hasan Efendi/Pasha (1595)
- Emir Mehmed Pasha (1595), 2nd term
- Mezbeleturpu Mahmud Efendi/Pasha (1595–1596)
- Maktul Hacı Ibrahim Pasha (1596), 4th term
- Ali Çavuş/Efendi (1596–1597)
- Tophaneli Mahmud Efendi/Pasha (1597), 1st term
- Ali Çavuş/Efendi (1597)
- Tophaneli Mahmud Efendi/Pasha (1597–1598), 2nd term
- Tezkireci–zade Mahmud Pasha (1598–1599)
- Burhaneddin Pasha (1599–1600), 2nd term
- Tophaneli Mahmud Efendi/Pasha (1600–1603), 3rd term

=== Reign of Sultan Ahmed I ===
- Tophaneli Mahmud Efendi/Pasha (1603), continued from previous reign
- Musa Çelebi–zade Mehmed Pasha (1603–1604)
- Hafız Mahmud Efendi (1604–1605)
- Tophaneli Mahmud Efendi/Pasha (1605–1606), 4th term
- Ekmekcioğlu Ahmed Pasha (1606–1613)
- Lanka–zade Mustafa Efendi (1614–1615), 1st term
- Abdülbaki/Baki Efendi/Pasha (1614–1615), 1st term
- Lanka–zade Mustafa Efendi (1615–1616), 2nd term
- Rizeli Hasan Pasha (1617), 1st term

=== 1st Reign of Sultan Mustafa I ===
- Rizeli Hasan Pasha (1618), continued from previous reign
- Yahnikapan Abdulkerim Efendi/Pasha (1618), 1st term

=== Reign of Sultan Osman II ===
- Yahnikapan Abdulkerim Efendi/Pasha (1619), continued from previous reign
- Rizeli Hasan Pasha (1620–1621), 2nd term
- Abdulbaki/Baki Pasha (1621–1622), 2nd term

=== 2nd Reign of Sultan Mustafa I ===
- Rizeli Hasan Pasha (1622–1624), 3rd term

=== Reign of Sultan Murad IV ===
- Abdulbaki/Baki Pasha (1624–1625), 3rd term
- Yahnikapan Abdulkerim Pasha (1625), 2nd term
- Ebubekir Efendi/Pasha (1625), 1st term
- Ömer Pasha (1625–1626)
- Ebubekir Efendi/Pasha (1626–1629), 2nd term
- Softa Mustafa Pasha (1629–1632)
- Hüseyin Efendi (1632)
- Prevezeli Mustafa Pasha (1632–1633)
- Mostarlı Ibrahim Pasha (1633–1636)
- Sofu Mehmet Pasha (1636–1639)
- Defterdarzade Ibrahim Pasha (1639)

=== Reign of Sultan Ibrahim ===
- Ebe Damadı Ibrahim Efendi (1644)
- Hasanzade Efendi (1644)
- Nevesinli Salih Pasha (1644–1645)
- Hezarpare Ahmet Pasha (1646–1647)
- Halıcızade Mehmed Pasha (1647–1648), 1st term

=== Reign of Sultan Mehmed IV ===
- Halıcızade Mehmed Pasha (1651–1652), 2nd term
- Halıcızade Mehmed Pasha (1656), 3rd term
- Halıcı Damadı Mustafa Pasha (1656)
- Cebeci Ahmed Pasha (1661–1675)

== List of ministers of finance (1837 and later) ==
In 1837, a modern ministry was founded under the name of Maliye Nezareti (Ministry of Finance).

=== Reign of Sultan Mahmud II ===
- Abdurrahman Nafiz Pasha (March 1838 – September 1839), 1st term

=== Reign of Sultan Abdülmecid I ===
- Ibrahim Saib Pasha (September 1839 – February 1841)
- Musa Saffeti Pasha (February 1841 – September 1845)
- Abdurrahman Nafiz Pasha (September 1845 – February 1847), 2nd term
- Ibrahim Sarim Pasha (February 1847 – February 1848)
- Sadık Rıfat Pasha (March 1848 – April 1848)
- Hüseyin Hüsnü Efendi (February 1849 – August 1849)
- Mehmed Halid Efendi (June 1850 – August 1951)
- Ahmed Muhtar Itisami Pasha (October 1852 – November 1853), 1st term
- Musa Safveti Pasha (November 1853 – November 1854)
- Ali Şefik Pasha (December 1854 – May 1855)
- Ahmed Muhtar Itisami Pasha (May 1855 – December 1856), 2nd term
- Mehmed Hasib Pasha (July 1857 – March 1858), 1st term
- Mehmed Hasib Pasha (February 1859 – June 1860), 2nd term
- Taşcızade Mehmed Tevfik Pasha (November 1860 – November 1861)

=== Reign of Abdülaziz ===
- Ebubekir Mümtaz Efendi (November 1861 – June 1862)
- Hüseyin Mecid Efendi (June 1862 – July 1862)
- Mehmed Nevres Pasha (July 1862 – January 1863)
- Mustafa Fazl Pasha (January 1863 – March 1864), 1st term
- Mehmed Kani Pasha (March 1864 – April 1865), 1st term
- Mehmed Hurşid Pasha (April 1865 – December 1865)
- Şirvanlızade Mehmed Rüşdi Pasha (December 1865 – February 1869), 1st term
- Mehmed Sadık Pasha (February 1869 – August 1870), 1st term
- Mustafa Fazl Pasha (August 1870 – January 1871), 2nd term
- Şirvanlızade Mehmed Rüşdi Pasha (January 1871 – June 1871), 2nd term
- Ahmed Hamdi Pasha (June – August 1871), 1st term
- Mehmed Sadık Pasha (August 1871 – November 1871), 2nd term
- Yusuf Ziya Pasha (1826-1882) (November 1871 – February 1872), 1st term
- Abdullah Galib Pasha (February 1872 – May 1872), 1st term
- Emin Pasha (May 1872 – August 1872)
- Ahmed Hamdi Pasha (April 1873 – March 1874), 2nd term
- Yusuf Ziya Pasha (1826-1882) (March 1874 – April 1876), 2nd term

=== Reign of Murad V ===
- Abdullah Galib Pasha (April 1876 – January 1877), 2nd term

=== Reign of Abdulhamid II ===
- Mehmed Kani Pasha (January – August 1878), 2nd term
- Ahmet Zühdü Pasha (August 1878 – February 1879), 1st term
- Ahmet Zühdü Pasha (May – November 1879), 2nd term
- Ibrahim Edib Efendi (November 1879 – May 1880), 1st term
- Abdüllatif Suphi Pasha (May 1880 – January 1881)
- Hüseyin Tevfik Pasha (January – July 1881), 1st term
- Ahmet Münir Pasha (July 1881 – November 1882), 1st term
- Mehmet Münir Bey (November 30, 1882 – December 3, 1882)
- Ibrahim Edib Efendi (December 3–6, 1882), 2nd term
- Ahmet Münir Pasha (December 1882 – August 1885), 2nd term
- Agop Ohannes Kazasyan Pasha (August 28–30, 1885), 1st term
- Mustafa Zihni Pasha (September 30, 1885 – December 1886)
- Agop Ohannes Kazasyan Pasha (December 1886 – March 1887), 2nd term
- Mahmud Celaleddin Pasha (1839-1899) (December 1887 – August 1888)
  - He embezzled funds and therefore received an official termination. He would have otherwise received capital punishment, but he paid a fine to avoid it. Evangelia Balta and Ayșe Kavak, authors of "Publisher of the newspaper Konstantinoupolis for half a century," wrote that the fine was "large" and that the newspaper Servet had a "militant stance" on the behavior.
- Agop Kazazyan Pasha (August 1888 – March 1891)
- Ahmet Nazif Pasha (March 1891 – November 1895), 1st term
- Hüseyin Sabri Bey (November 1895 – January 1896), 1st term
- Ahmet Nazif Pasha (January 1896 – October 1897), 2nd term
- Hüseyin Tevfik Pasha (October 1897 – August 1898), 2nd term
- Ahmet Reşad Pasha (August 1898 – April 1901), 1st term
- Ahmed Reşad Pasha (September 1901 – October 1904), 2nd term
- Mehmet Ziya Pasha (December 1905 – 3 August 1908), 1st term
- Mehmet Ragıb Bey (August 3–7, 1908)
- Mehmet Ziya Pasha (August 7, 1908 – February 1909), 2nd term
- Mehmet Rifat Bey (February 1909 – April 1909), 1st term
- Osman Nuri Bey (April 1909)

=== Reign of Sultan Mehmed V ===
- Mehmed Rifat Bey (May 1909 – July 1909), 2nd term
- Mehmet Cavit Bey (July 1909 – October 1911), 1st term
- Mustafa Nail Bey (October 1911 – July 1912)
- Abdurrahman Vefik Sayın (July 1912 – January 1913), 1st term
- Mehmet Cavit Bey (March 1914 – November 1914), 2nd term
- Talaat Pasha (November 1914 – February 1917)

=== Reign of Sultan Mehmed VI ===
- Abdurrahman Vefik Sayın (November 1918 – February 1919), 2nd term
- Mehmet Ata Bey (February 1919 – March 1919)
- Mehmet Tevfik Biren (March 1919 – March 1920), 1st term
- Faik Nüzhet Bey (March – April 1920), 1st term
- Ahmed Reşad Bey (April – August 1920)
- Mehmed Nazif Bey (August 1920 – September 1920)
- Raşid Bey (October 1920 – January 1921)
- Hüseyin Sabri Bey (September 1920 – October 1920), 2nd term
- Abdullah Lami Bey (January 1921 – June 1921)
- Faik Nüzhet Bey (August 1921 – April 1922), 2nd term
- Mehmet Tevfik Biren (April 1922 – November 1922), 2nd term

== See also ==
- State organisation of the Ottoman Empire
