= List of wars involving Egypt =

This is a list of wars involving the Arab Republic of Egypt and its predecessor states.

Egyptian victory

Egyptian defeat

Another result*

*e.g. result unknown or indecisive/inconclusive, result of internal conflict inside Egypt, status quo ante bellum, or a treaty or peace without a clear result

== Early Dynastic Period (3100–2890 BC) ==
Conflict	Combatant 1	Combatant 2	Results	Pharaoh	Egyptian losses
Unification of Upper and Lower Egypt	Upper Egypt	Lower Egypt	Upper Egypt victory: Unification of Egypt	Narmer	?
Egyptian expedition to Nubia	First Dynasty of Egypt	A-Group culture	Victory	Hor-Aha	?
Egypto-Nubian conflict (c. 3100–3000 BC)	First Dynasty of Egypt	A-Group culture (Nubia)	Victory: A-Group culture destroyed by the pharaohs of Egypt.; Lower Nubia was not inhabited for centuries afterwards.	Djer or Djet	?
War of succession	Horus Bird	Sneferka	inconclusive: Neither side wins; Egypt reunified later on by Hotepsekhemwy	Hotepsekhemwy	?
War of the gods	Khasekhemwy	followers of the god Horus followers of the god Set	Pharaoh victory: Lower and upper Egypt reunited	Khasekhemwy	?

== Old Kingdom (2686–2181 BC) ==
Conflict	Combatant 1	Combatant 2	Results	Pharaoh	Egyptian losses
Egyptian campaigns in Sinai	Third Dynasty of Egypt	Sinai inhabitants	Victory: Local inhabitants were subdued	Djoser	?
Egyptian Campaign in Nubia and Libya (c. 2600 BC)	Fourth Dynasty of Egypt	Nubians Libyans	Victory: Thousands of cattle and prisoners taken as spoils	Sneferu	?
Egyptian campaign in Nubia, Sinai and southern Canaan	Sixth Dynasty of Egypt	Nubians Bedouins Canaanites	Victory: A booty of men and goods was brought back to Egypt for presentation to the pharaoh	Pepi I Meryre	?

== First Intermediate Period of Egypt (2181–2055 BC) ==
Conflict	Combatant 1	Combatant 2	Results	Pharaoh	Egyptian losses
The Theban-Hieraconopolis Struggle	Heracleopolis	Thebes; Koptos; Dendera	Theban Victory: Koptos, Dendera and the three nomes of Hierakonpolis under Theban control, expanding the Theban kingdom 250 km northward with a border near Abydos.	Mentuhotep I Intef I	?
Sack of Thinis	Ninth Dynasty of Egypt	Thinis	Thinis Sacked	Nebkaure Khety	?

== Middle Kingdom Period (2055–1650 BC) ==
Conflict	Combatant 1	Combatant 2	Results	Pharaoh	Egyptian losses
Reunification of Egypt	Eleventh Dynasty of Egypt (Thebes)	Tenth Dynasty of Egypt (Heracleopolis)	Theban victory: End of the First Intermediate Period	Mentuhotep II	?
Egyptian campaign in nubia and Canaan	Eleventh Dynasty of Egypt	Nubia	Victory: End of Nubian independence	Mentuhotep II	?
Expedition to Punt	Eleventh dynasty of Egypt	Land of Punt	Victory: The region cleared of rebels; 12 wells built for future expeditions; Egyptians returned from Punt with many goods	Mentuhotep III	?
Egyptian Campaign in Lower Nubia (c. 1953 BC)	Twelfth Dynasty of Egypt	Various peoples in Lower Nubia.	Victory: Nubians defeated and Egyptian colonisation of Lower Nubia.	Senusret I	?
Destruction of Iuai and Iasy	Twelfth Dynasty of Egypt	Inhabitants of Iuai and Iasy	Victory: Iuai and Iasy destroyed and looted	Amenemhat II	?
Egyptian conquest of lower Nubia (c. 1870–1859 BC)	Twelfth Dynasty of Egypt	Various Nubian peoples	Victory: Nubians defeated and Egyptian expansion into Nubia.	Senusret III	?
Kerma campaign	Twelfth Dynasty of Egypt	Kingdom of Kerma	Victory	Amenemhat III	?
Egyptian Campaign in Canaan (Between c. 1880 and c. 1840 BC)	Twelfth Dynasty of Egypt	Shechem; Retjenu	Victory: Both Shechem and Retjenu defeated by Egypt.	Senusret III	?
Expedition to Nubia	Twelfth Dynasty of Egypt	Nubians	Victory	Amenemhat III	?

== Second Intermediate Period (1650–1550 BC) ==
Conflict	Combatant 1	Combatant 2	Results	Pharaoh	Egyptian losses
Collapse of the Middle Kingdom	Fourteenth Dynasty of Egypt	Thirteenth Dynasty of Egypt	Victory for the Fourteenth Dynasty of Egypt: The 13th Dynasty have controlled Upper Egypt, while the 14th Dynasty ruled Lower Egypt	Yakbim Sekhaenre	?
Uprising of the 16th Dynasty	Fifteenth Dynasty of Egypt	Sixteenth Dynasty of Egypt	Defeat: Uprising of the hyksos	Nebiryraw I	?
Separation of central Egypt	Abydos Dynasty|	Seventeenth Dynasty of Egypt	Victory for Abydos dynasty	Pantjeny	?
Kerman-Hyksos Allied war against The 17th dynasty	17th Dynasty	Kerma culture	Defeat: Kushites invasion of Upper Egypt; Nubians successfully looted major Egyptian royal statues and monuments, Bringing them back to Kerma as trophies.	Tao or Kamose	?
Theban-Hyksos conflict	Seventeenth Dynasty of Egypt	Hyksos	Victory: Fall of the Hyksos kingdom; Egypt invades Levantine territory and gains a bridgehead in the Levant; Beginning of the new kingdom period	Seqenenre Tao, Kamose, Ahmose I	?

== New Kingdom Period (1550–1077 BC) ==
Conflict	Combatant 1	Combatant 2	Results	Pharaoh	Egyptian losses
Egyptian campaigns in the Levant and Syria	Eighteenth Dynasty of Egypt	Asiatics	Victory: Hundreds of cities destroyed	Ahmose I	?
First Egyptian campaign in Nubia	Eighteenth Dynasty of Egypt	Kingdom of kerma	Victory: Nubia became under Egyptian rule	Ahmose I	?
First Nubian Rebellion	Eighteenth Dynasty of Egypt	Nubian rebels	Victory: Revolt suppressed	Ahmose I	?
Qeheq invasion of western Delta	Eighteenth Dynasty of Egypt	Qeheq Peoples	Victory: Qeheq people exiled from western Delta	Amenhotep I	?
Western desert campaign	Eighteenth Dynasty of Egypt	Qeheq Peoples	Victory: Egypt spreads influence through the western desert	Amenhotep I	?
Second Egyptian campaign in Nubia	Eighteenth Dynasty of Egypt	Nubians	Victory: Nubian king killed by Thutmose I and hung from the prow of his ship; Permanently extending the Egyptian military presence in Nubia	Thutmose I	?
Egyptian campaign in Mitanni	Eighteenth Dynasty of Egypt	Naharin	Victory: First time Egyptians ever crossed the Euphrates River	Thutmose I	?
Egyptian campaign in the Levant and Syria	Eighteenth Dynasty of Egypt	Canaanites Naharin	Victory: Syrian princes declared allegiance to Thutmose; As many as 20 sites in the Levant suffered destruction; First time Egyptians ever crossed the Euphrates River	Thutmose I	?
Capture of the hyksos	Eighteenth Dynasty of Egypt	Hyksos remnants	Victory: End of the Hyksos power	Thutmose I	?
Second Nubian rebellion	Eighteenth Dynasty of Egypt	Nubians rebels	Victory: Nubian independence ended for 400 years; Nubia did not dare revolt as often as it had and was easily controlled by future Egyptian kings	Thutmose I	?
Third Nubian Rebellion	Eighteenth Dynasty of Egypt	Nubian rebels	Victory: Revolt easily crushed	Thutmose II	?
The Shashu Rebellion	Eighteenth Dynasty of Egypt	Shasu Bedouins	Victory: Sinai remains under Egyptian control	Thutmose II	?
Egyptian conquest of Cyprus	Eighteenth Dynasty of Egypt	Cyprus	Victory: Egyptian rule of Cyprus; Inhabitants forced to pay tribute	Thutmose III	?
Egyptian conquest of Punt	Eighteenth Dynasty of Egypt	Punt	Victory	Thutmose III	?
Egyptian Campaign in the Levant (1458–1457 BC)	Eighteenth Dynasty of Egypt	Canaanites; Kadesh; Megiddo; Kingdom of Mitanni; Hurrians	Victory: Egyptian victory at the Battle of Megiddo, resulting in expansion of Egyptian empire.	Thutmose III	4,000 at the Battle of Megiddo
Conquest of Syria	Eighteenth Dynasty of Egypt	Asiatics	Victory: Many cities in Syria, Jordan, Lebanon and Canaan taken	Thutmose III	?
Invasion of Phoenicia	Eighteenth Dynasty of Egypt	Phoenicia	Victory: Many cities in Syria, and Lebanon were taken	Thutmose III	?
Ardata revolts	Eighteenth Dynasty of Egypt	Asiatics	Victory: Revolt suppressed	Thutmose III	?
Egyptian attack on Mitanni	Eighteenth Dynasty of Egypt	Mitanni	Victory: Mitanni conquered with little resistance; Thutmose III went from city to city and pillaged them	Thutmose III	?
Nuhašše Rebellion	Eighteenth Dynasty of Egypt	Nuhašše rebels	Victory: north Syria remains under Egyptian rule	Thutmose III	?
Shasu campaign	Eighteenth Dynasty of Egypt	Shasu nomads	Victory	Thutmose III	?
Rebellions in the Arka	Eighteenth Dynasty of Egypt	Arkantu people	Victory: Revolt suppressed	Thutmose III	?
Third Egyptian campaign in Nubia	Eighteenth Dynasty of Egypt	Nubia	Victory: Expansion of the Egyptian empire	Thutmose III	?
First Syrian campaign	Eighteenth Dynasty of Egypt	Asiatics	Victory: Many cities in Syria, Jordan, Lebanon and Canaan taken	Amenhotep II	?
Egyptian-Mitanni conflict	Eighteenth Dynasty of Egypt	Mitanni: levantine rebels; Mitanni vassals	Victory: Egyptian rule in levant restored	Amenhotep II	?
Fourth Nubian Rebellion	Eighteenth Dynasty of Egypt	Nubian rebels	Victory: Revolt suppressed	Thutmose IV	?
Fifth rebellion in Nubia	Eighteenth Dynasty of Egypt	kushite rebels	Victory: Revolt suppressed	Amenhotep III	?
Fourth expedition to Nubia	Eighteenth Dynasty of Egypt	Nubian nomadic tribes	Victory: Revolt suppressed	Akhenaten	?
Clashes with the Nubians and Asiatics	Eighteenth Dynasty of Egypt	Asiatics Nubians	Victory	Tutankhamun	?
Campaigns against the Hittites	Nineteenth Dynasty of Egypt	Hittite empire: Hittite vassals	Victory: Egypt took control of some cities in the Levant	Seti I	?
Extermination of Sherden pirates	Nineteenth Dynasty of Egypt	Sherden pirates	Victory	Ramesses II	?
Egyptian-Hittite conflict	Nineteenth Dynasty of Egypt	Hittites	inconclusive: Egypt briefly recaptures southern Syrian territory from the Hittites; Egyptian–Hittite peace treaty	Seti I, Ramses II	?
Fifth Nubian campaign	Nineteenth Dynasty of Egypt	Nubians	Victory	Ramesses II	?
Libyan campaigns	Nineteenth Dynasty of Egypt	libu tribes	Victory	Ramesses II	?
Second Egyptian-Libu war	Nineteenth Dynasty of Egypt	libu tribes: Temehu; Rebu; Tehenu; Meshwesh; Sea Peoples	Victory: Sea people and Libyans fail to conquer the Delta region	Merneptah	?
Suppression of revolts in Canaan	Nineteenth Dynasty of Egypt	Israelites	Victory: Revolt suppressed	Merneptah	?
Sea Peoples' invasion of Egypt	Twentieth Dynasty of Egypt	Sea Peoples; Libyan tribes: Meshwesh; Sherden; Denyen; Philistines	Victory: Egyptians defeat the Sea Peoples in two land and sea battles; invasion repelled	Ramses III	?
Invasion of Cyrenaica	Twentieth Dynasty of Egypt	Libyan tribes of Cyrenaica: Meshwesh; Rebu	Victory: Egypt claimed overlordship of Cyrenaican tribes and controls Cyrenaica	Ramses III	?
Third campaign in Libya	Twentieth Dynasty of Egypt	Libyan parties: Meshwesh	Victory	Ramesses VI	?
Libyan invasion of upper Egypt	Twentieth Dynasty of Egypt	Libyan parties: Meshwesh	Victory: Libyans switch to invade Delta after their defeat in upper Egypt	Ramesses X	?
Sixth nubian revolt	Twentieth Dynasty of Egypt	Nubian chiefdoms	Defeat: Nubian declaration of Independence after 435 years of Egyptian rule	Ramesses XI	?
Priests of Amun war	Twentieth Dynasty of Egypt	High Priest of Amun	Rebel victory: High Priest of Amun take control over upper Egypt; Egypt becomes separated; the beginning of the Third Intermediate Period of Egypt	Ramesses XI	?

== Third Intermediate Period of Egypt (1077 BC–664 BC) ==
Conflict	Combatant 1	Combatant 2	Results	Pharaoh	Egyptian losses
Theban revolt	Twenty-first Dynasty of Egypt	High Priest of Amun	Victory for the Pharaoh: Revolt was suppressed by Menkheperre	Ramesses XI	?
Unification of Egypt	Twenty-second Dynasty of Egypt	High Priest of Amun	Victory	Shoshenq I	?
Battle of Bitter Lakes	Twenty-second Dynasty of Egypt	Nomads	Victory	Shoshenq I	?
Jeroboam's Revolt	Twenty-second Dynasty of Egypt; Kingdom of Israel	Kingdom of Judah	Victory: Jerusalem sacked by the Egyptian army	Shoshenq I	?
Civil war of the meshwesh	Twenty-second Dynasty of Egypt	Twenty-third Dynasty of Egypt	Defeat: Separation of Egypt into different Meshwesh chiefs	Osorkon II	?
Nubian invasion of Egypt	Meshwesh kingdoms	Nubia	Nubian Victory: Nubian expansion through Egypt	Piye	?
Egyptian influence extension in the Near East	Twenty-fifth Dynasty of Egypt	Near East kingdoms	Defeat	Piye	?
Philistia and Gaza rebellion	Twenty-fifth Dynasty of Egypt philistia and Gaza rebels	Neo-Assyrian Empire	Defeat	Piye	?
Conquest of the nile valley	Twenty-fifth Dynasty of Egypt	Neo-Assyrian Empire nilotic peoples	Victory: Shebitku conquered the entire Nile Valley, including Upper Egypt	Shebitku	?
Ashdod rebellion	Twenty-fifth Dynasty of Egypt Palestinian rebels	Neo-Assyrian Empire	Defeat	Shabaka	?
Siege of Judah (701 BC)	Twenty-fifth Dynasty of Egypt Kingdom of Judah	Neo-Assyrian Empire	Victory	Taharqa	?
Assyrian conquest of Egypt (674 BC)	Twenty-fifth Dynasty of Egypt	Neo-Assyrian Empire	Victory	Taharqa	?
Assyrian conquest of Egypt	Twenty-fifth Dynasty of Egypt	Neo-Assyrian Empire	Defeat: The Neo-Assyrian Empire controls Egypt for over a period of about 10 years.	Taharqa	?
Reconquest of Egypt	Twenty-fifth Dynasty of Egypt	Neo-Assyrian Empire	Victory: Taharqa reoccupied Memphis, as well as the Delta	Taharqa	?
Sack of Thebes	Twenty-fifth Dynasty of Egypt	Neo-Assyrian Empire Egyptian vassals	Defeat: End of the 25th Dynasty	Tantamani	?

== Late Period (c. 664–332 BC) ==
Conflict	Combatant 1	Combatant 2	Results	Pharaoh	Egyptian losses
Reunification of Egypt	Twenty-sixth Dynasty of Egypt Kingdom of Lydia	kinglets of the Dodecarchy Libyan tribes Neo-Assyrian Empire	Victory: In 654 BCE, Psamtik I was firmly in control of all Egypt; Fall of Ashdod; The capture of Ashdod may have effectively reflected part of the transfer of power from the crumbling Assyrian Empire to the new Egyptian 26th Dynasty	Psamtik I	?
Egyptian invasion of Libya	Twenty-sixth Dynasty of Egypt	Libyan tribes	Victory: Western desert and Cyrenaica were annexed by Egypt	Psamtik I	?
Egyptian intervention in the Assyrian-Babylonian war	Twenty-sixth Dynasty of Egypt; Neo-Assyrian Empire	Chaldea; Babylonia; Scythians; Medes	Egyptian military victory: The Scythians Depart from the Levant; Psamtik expanded his military operations through the Via Maris into the Levant	Psamtik I	?
Egyptian conquest of Judah (609 BC)	Twenty-sixth Dynasty of Egypt	Kingdom of Judah	Victory: Routing of the entire Judean army; Subjugation of Judah by Dynasty XXVI of Egypt	Necho II	Undetermined, but low
Egyptian Babylonian war	Twenty-sixth Dynasty of Egypt	Chaldea; Babylonia; Scythians; Medes; Persians	Inconclusive: Egyptian capture of Kummuh and Gaza; Defeat at the Battle of Carchemish; Failed Babylonian invasion of Egypt	Necho II	?
Nubian campaign	Twenty-sixth Dynasty of Egypt	Meroë	Victory	Necho II	?
Invasion of Nubia	Twenty-sixth Dynasty of Egypt	Meroë	Victory	Psamtik II	?
Palestinian expedition	Twenty-sixth Dynasty of Egypt; Kingdom of Judah	Neo-Babylonian Empire	Victory: Vassalization of the Kingdom of Judah	Psamtik II	?
Judah's revolts against Babylon	Kingdom of Judah; Supported by: Twenty-sixth Dynasty of Egypt	Neo-Babylonian Empire; Moab; Ammon; Chaldea	Defeat: Destruction of Solomon's Temple; Beginning of the Babylonian captivity	Apries	?
Levantine campaign	Twenty-sixth Dynasty of Egypt	Neo-Babylonian Empire	Victory: Capture of Sidon	Apries	?
Babylonian invasion of Egypt (582 BCE)	Twenty-sixth Dynasty of Egypt	Neo-Babylonian Empire	Victory: Invasion repelled	Apries	?
Battle of Irasa	Twenty-sixth Dynasty of Egypt	Greek settlers of Cyrenaica	Defeat	Apries	?
Amasis's coup against Apries	Amasis II: Egyptian troops	Apries: foreign mercenaries Supported by: Neo-Babylonian Empire	Victory: Amasis II declared himself pharaoh; Apries was killed during the coup; Nebuchadnezzar fails to vassalise Egypt	Amasis II	Undetermined, but hundreds of thousands of soldiers were either lost or killed
Egyptian conquest of Cyprus	Twenty-sixth Dynasty of Egypt	Cyprus	Victory: Egyptian control over Cyprus	Amasis II	?
Babylonian invasion of Egypt (568–567 BC)	Twenty-sixth Dynasty of Egypt	Neo-Babylonian Empire	Victory: Invasion repelled	Amasis II	?
First Achaemenid conquest of Egypt	Twenty-sixth Dynasty of Egypt	Achaemenid Empire Arabian and Greek mercenaries	Defeat: Egypt annexed by the Achaemenid Empire; Fall of the 26th Dynasty of Egypt	Psamtik III	50,000
Achaemenid expedition to siwa	Egyptian rebels	Achaemenid Empire	Victory: The entire Achaemenid army either lost or killed	Petubastis III	?
Petubastis III revolt	Egyptian rebels	Achaemenid Empire	Defeat: Egypt along with the Libyan desert were annexed by the Achaemenid Empire	Petubastis III	?
Psammetichus IV revolt	Egyptian rebels	Achaemenid Empire	Victory	Psammetichus IV	?
Wars of the Delian League	Egyptian rebels Delian League	Achaemenid Empire and its allies	Inconclusive: Persia loses control over Thrace, the Aegean sea and the western coast of Asia Minor.; Greek expeditionary force defeated and repelled from Egypt.	Inaros II Pericles Charitimides Cimon	?
Inaros II revolt	Egypt	Achaemenid Empire and its allies	Defeat	Inaros II	Undetermined, but low
Amyrtaeus revolt	Egyptian rebels	Achaemenid Empire	Victory	Amyrtaeus	?
Invasion of Asia Minor (396–394 BC)	Egypt Sparta	Achaemenid Empire and its allies	Victory	Nepherites I	?
Persian attack on Egypt (385 BCE)	Egypt	Achaemenid Empire	Victory	Hakor	Undetermined, but low
Achaemenid invasion of Egypt (374 BCE)	Egypt	Achaemenid Empire Greek mercenaries Arabs	Victory: Nectanebo takes over southern Egypt	Nectanebo I	?
Egyptian expedition into Palestine and Phoenicia	Egypt	Achaemenid Empire and its allies	Victory: Egypt takes over the levant	Teos of Egypt	?
Nakhthorheb rebellion	Teos of Egypt	Nakhthorheb	Victory for Nakhthorheb and his father: Djedhor could not reach the Achaemenid capital which will lead to the second Achaemenid conquest of Egypt	Teos of Egypt	?
Phoenician rebellion	Egypt Phoenician rebels	Achaemenid Empire	Inconclusive	Nectanebo II	?
Second Achaemenid conquest of Egypt	Egypt	Achaemenid Empire	Defeat: Persians take over Egypt after 60 years	Nectanebo II	?
Khabash's revolt	Egypt	Achaemenid Empire	Victory: Egypt becomes independent a few years before the Macedonian conquest of Egypt.	Khabash	?
Khabash's invasion of Kush	Egypt	Meroë	Defeat	Khabash	?
Wars of Alexander the Great	Macedonian Empire Hellenic League Egyptian rebels	Achaemenid Empire; Illyrians; Thracians; Polis; Bactria; Sogdia; Uxiians; Pauravas; Aśvaka; Guraens; Mallians; Oxydracians; Amvastha	Victory: Macedonian Empire spans from the Balkans and Egypt in the west to Central Asia and India in the east; Beginning of the Hellenistic period	Alexander the Great	~1 million

== Ptolemaic Kingdom (310–30 BC) ==
Conflict	Combatant 1	Combatant 2	Results	Pharaoh	Egyptian losses
Perdiccas Invasion of Egypt	Ptolemaic Kingdom	Macedonia	Victory: Invasion failed; Perdiccas was murdered in his tent by two of his subordinates	Ptolemy I Soter	?
First occupation of Syria	Ptolemaic Kingdom; Seleucid Empire	Antigonid dynasty	Victory: Syria was ceded to Ptolemy	Ptolemy I Soter	?
Expedition in Asia minor and Macedon	Ptolemaic Kingdom	Antigonid dynasty	Victory: Detached the coastal towns of Phaselis, Xanthos, Kaunos, Iasos and Myndus in Lycia and Caria from Antigonus	Ptolemy I Soter	?
Reconquest of Cyprus	Ptolemaic Kingdom	Antigonid dynasty	Victory	Ptolemy I Soter	?
Cyrenaican rebellion (313 BC)	Ptolemaic Kingdom	Cyrenaica	Victory	Ptolemy I Soter	?
Cyrenaican invasion of Egypt	Ptolemaic Kingdom Libyan nomads	Cyrenaica; Antigonid dynasty	Victory: Ptolemaic rule in Cyrenaica restored	Ptolemy II Philadelphus	?
Ptolemaic expedition to Arabia	Ptolemaic Kingdom	Nabatea; Arab nomads	Victory: Western coast of Arabia was reconnoitered by the Ptolemaic military	Ptolemy II Philadelphus	?
Ptolemaic campaign into Nubia(275 BC)	Ptolemaic Kingdom	Kingdom of Kush	Victory: Ptolemaic forces invaded Nubia and annexed twelve miles north of Triakontaschoinos	Ptolemy II Philadelphus	?
First Syrian War (274–271 BC)	Ptolemaic Kingdom	Seleucid Empire	Victory: Ptolemaic rule extended into Caria and most of Cilicia (both in modern-day Turkey).	Ptolemy II Philadelphus	?
Chremonidean War (267–261 BC)	Athens; Sparta; Ptolemaic Kingdom	Macedonia	Defeat: Macedonian victory. Antigonid control over the city-states of Greece.	Ptolemy II Philadelphus	?
Second Syrian War (274–271 BC)	Ptolemaic Kingdom	Seleucid Empire; Macedonia	Stalemate: Cilicia, Pamphylia, Ionia, Miletus and Ephesus taken by the Selecuid Empire.; Marriage of Antiochus II Theos to Ptolemy's daughter Berenice Syra.	Ptolemy II Philadelphus	?
Berenice II Usurpation in Cyrenaica	Ptolemaic Kingdom	Cyrenaica; Antigonid dynasty	Victory: Ptolemaic rule in Cyrenaica restored	Ptolemy III Euergetes	?
Third Syrian War (246–241 BC)	Ptolemaic Kingdom	Seleucid Empire	Stalemate: Loss of Cyclades to Seleucid Empire.; Ptolemaic kingdom awarded new territories in Syria, including Seleucia Pieria.	Ptolemy III Euergetes	?
The Egyptian rebellion (245 BC)	Ptolemaic Kingdom	Egyptian rebels	Rebels defeated: the Inundation of the Nile river failed in 245 BC, resulting in famine	Ptolemy III Euergetes	?
Ptolemaic campaign in horn of Africa	Ptolemaic Kingdom	Axum	Victory: Ptolemy III Euergetes annexed several northern Ethiopian cities such as Tigray and the port of Adulis	Ptolemy III Euergetes	?
Fourth Syrian War (219–217 BC)	Ptolemaic Kingdom	Seleucid Empire	Victory: Ptolemaic victory at the Battle of Raphia and preserved control of Coele-Syria.	Ptolemy IV Philopator	2,200 at the Battle of Raphia
Great Theban Revolt (286–186 BC)	Ptolemaic Kingdom	Horwennefer Ankhwennefer; Supported by: Meroë	Ptolemaic victory: Upper Egypt gaining independence for 20 years; Ankhwennefer proclaimed Pharaoh over Upper Egypt; Upper Egypt gained de facto autonomy from Ptolemaic King; The Egyptian rebel leaders were taken to Memphis and publicly executed on 26 March 186 BC	Ptolemy V Epiphanes	?
Alexandrian revolution (203–202 BC)	Agathocles of Egypt	Alexandrian rebels	Alexandrian rebels' victory: Agathocles, his sister Agathoclea, and their supporters were captured and killed by a mob in Alexandria.; Tlepolemus became the new regent for Ptolemy V	Ptolemy V Epiphanes	?
Fifth Syrian War (202–195 BC)	Ptolemaic Kingdom	Seleucid Empire; Macedonia	Defeat: Coele-Syria taken by the Seleucid Empire.; Conciliatory treaty signed in 195 BC. Ptolemy V agrees to marry Antiochus III's daughter Cleopatra I Syra.	Ptolemy V Epiphanes	?
Sixth Syrian War (170–168 BC)	Ptolemaic Kingdom; Roman Republic (168 BC)	Seleucid Empire	Victory: Antiochus IV Epiphanes leaves Egypt after given ultimatum by Gaius Popillius Laenas.	Ptolemy VIII Physcon	?
Egyptian rebellions of (168–164 BC)	Egyptian rebels	Ptolemy VI Philometor	Egyptian rebels' victory: Ptolemy VI was expelled from Alexandria	Ptolemy VIII Physcon	?
Egyptian Civil war (132–126 BC)	Cleopatra II	Ptolemy VIII Physcon	Victory for Ptolemy VIII Physcon: Cleopatra II was forced to flee Egypt	Ptolemy VIII Physcon	?
Intervention in Syria (152–145 BC)	Ptolemaic Kingdom	Seleucid Empire	Ptolemaic military victory: Ptolemy VI briefly gained control over important Syrian cities; Alexander Balas fled and was later killed; Ptolemy VI was mortally wounded during the Battle of the Oenoparas River and died a few days later.	Ptolemy VI Philometor	?
Cyrenaican rebellion (162 BC)	Ptolemaic Kingdom	Cyrenaican Rebels	Victory: Ptolemy VIII Physcon regained control over Cyrene by the end of 162 BC	Ptolemy VIII Physcon	?
Reconquest of Cyprus	Ptolemaic Kingdom	Cyprus; Cleopatra II	Victory: Ptolemy VIII Physcon regained control over Cyprus	Ptolemy VIII Physcon	?
Caesar's Civil War (49 BC–45 BC)	Caesarians; Mauretania	Pompeians; Numidia; Ptolemaic Kingdom; Kingdom of Pontus	Caesarian victory	Ptolemy XIII Theos Philopator	?
Reconquest of Cyprus (106 BC)	Ptolemaic Kingdom	Cleopatra III	Victory	Ptolemy X Alexander I	?
Levantine campaign	Ptolemaic Kingdom	Judea; Phoenicia	Victory: Invasion of Judea; Ptolemy X invaded Phoenicia by sea and then marched inland to Damascus	Ptolemy X Alexander I	?
Egyptian rebellion (91 BC)	Ptolemaic Kingdom	Egyptian rebels Supported by: Theban priests	Victory for the rebels: The rebels gained control of Thebes; the Ptolemies lost contact with the Triakontaschoinos region	Ptolemy X Alexander I	?
War of Actium (32–30 BC)	Eastern Roman provinces Ptolemaic Egypt	Western Roman provinces	Defeat: Rome annexes Egypt and control over eastern provinces reasserted	Cleopatra VII	?

== Roman Egypt (30 BC – 395 AD) ==
Conflict	Combatant 1	Combatant 2	Results	Pharaoh/Emperor	Praefectus Aegypti	Egyptian losses
Revolt of Thebes	Roman Empire	Egyptian rebels in Thebes	Roman victory: Upper Egypt was brought under Roman control by force of arms; Cornelius established a protectorate over the southern frontier district	Augustus	Gaius Cornelius Gallus	?
Conquest of Arabia Petraea and Arabia Felix	Roman Empire	Nabataeans Sabaeans	Defeat: The campaign was successful in the beginning before the Roman army reached Arabia Felix	Augustus	Gaius Aelius Gallus	?
Roman Campaign into the kingdom of kush	Roman Empire	Kingdom of Kush	Victory: After the initial victories of Kandake Amanirenas against Roman Egypt, the Kushites of northern Nubia were defeated and Napata sacked; Kushites send ambassadors to negotiate a peace treaty between Rome and the kingdom of kush	Augustus	Gaius Petronius	?
Siege of Jerusalem	Roman Empire	Jewish rebels	Victory: Roman rule of Jerusalem restored	Titus	Tiberius Julius Alexander	?
Diaspora Revolt	Roman Empire; Local populations	Roman Jews rebels Judaea	Roman victory: Ethnic cleansing of Jews in Egypt, Cyrenaica and Cyprus; Halt of further Roman expansion to the east	Trajan	Marcus Rutilius Lupus	?
Bucolic War	Roman Empire	Isidorus; Egyptian rebels	Roman victory: Native Egyptians led by Isidorus defeated the Roman garrison of Egypt and took over all of Egypt with the exception of Alexandria; Cassius managed to destroy the Egyptian rebels by separating them from one another.; the beginning of Egypt's economic decline	Marcus Aurelius	Avidius Cassius/Gaius Vettius Sabinianus Julius Hospes	?
Usurpation of Avidius Cassius	Avidius Cassius; Gaius Calvisius Statianus; Titius Claudius Dryantianus Antonius	Publius Martius Verus; Herodes Atticus; Gaius Vettius Sabinianus	Inconclusive: When news of Aurelius' plans to invade reached Egypt, a centurion killed Cassius, and sent his head to Aurelius, who refused to see it, and ordered it buried; Aurelius was forced to withdraw from his campaign against the Iazyges, and end the Marcomannic War	Marcus Aurelius	Gaius Calvisius Statianus	Avidius Cassius beheaded
Usurpation of Mussius Aemilianus (261–262 CE)	Lucius Mussius Aemilianus; Memor	Aurelius Theodotus	Revolt suppressed	Gallienus	Lucius Mussius Aemilianus	?
Palmyrene invasion of Egypt (270 CE)	Roman Empire	Palmyrene Empire; Blemmyes	Defeat: The Roman Empire loses Egypt; Palmyrene annexation of Upper and Lower Egypt	Claudius II Gothicus	Tenagino Probus	?
Aurelian's reconquest of Egypt (272 CE)	Roman Empire	Palmyrene Empire	Victory: Fall of the Palmyrene Empire	Aurelian	Firmus	?
Revolt of Firmus	Roman Empire	Firmus	Victory	Aurelian	No clear Governor	?
Busiris–Coptos revolt (292–293 CE)	Roman Empire	Rebels at Busiris and Coptos	Revolt Suppressed	Diocletian	Galerius	?
Usurpation of Domitius Domitianus and Achilleus (297–298 CE)	Roman Empire	Domitius Domitianus; Aurelius Achilleus	Revolt Suppressed	Diocletian	Galerius	?

== Byzantine Egypt (395–642) ==
Conflict	Combatant 1	Combatant 2	Results	Basileus	Dux	Egyptian losses
Sasanian conquest of Egypt	Byzantine Empire	Sasanian Empire	Defeat: Egypt annexed by the Sasanian empire	Phocas; Heraclius	Nicetas	?
Muslim conquest of Egypt (639–642)	Byzantine Empire; Kingdom of Makuria	Rashidun Caliphate	Defeat: Rashidun Caliphate annexes Egypt, Cyrenaica, and Tripolitania	Heraclius	Cyrus of Alexandria; Theodore	?

== Rashidun Caliphate (642–661) ==
Conflict	Combatant 1	Combatant 2	Results	Caliph	Wali	Egyptian losses
Byzantine reconquest attempt of Egypt (645–646)	Rashidun Caliphate	Byzantine Empire	Victory	Uthman	Amr ibn al-As	?
Campaigns against Nubia	Rashidun Caliphate	Kingdom of Makuria	Defeat: After two unsuccessful campaigns, the Muslims were unable to overpower Makuria, so they negotiated a mutual non-aggression treaty.; Each side agreed to afford free passage to each other through their respective territories. Nubia agreed to provide 360 slaves to Egypt every year, while Egypt agreed to supply grain, horses, and textiles to Nubia according to demand.	Umar; Uthman	Amr ibn al-As; Abdullah ibn Saad	?
Rebellion of the Egyptian delegation	Rashidun Caliphate	Egyptian rebels	Rebels Victory: Assassination of Uthman	Uthman	Abdullah ibn Saad	?
First Fitna	Rashidun Caliphate	Mu'awiya's forces and Aisha's forces Kharijites	Hasan–Muawiya treaty: Stalemate between forces of Ali and forces of Mu'awiya; Kharijites defeated; Dissolution of the Rashidun Caliphate and establishment of the Umayyad Caliphate	Ali	Muhammad ibn Abi Bakr	?

== Umayyad Caliphate (661–750) ==
Conflict	Combatant 1	Combatant 2	Results	Caliph	Wali	Egyptian losses
Second Fitna	Umayyad Caliphate	Zubayrid Caliphate Alids Kharijites	Umayyad Victory: Dissolution of the Zubayrid Caliphate; Defeat of several Alid revolts; Kharijites decisively defeated	Yazid I	Marwan I	?
Third Fitna	Pro-Qays Umayyads Pro-Yaman Umayyads	Alids; Kharijites; Hashimiyya	Victory for the pro-Qays: Victory of Marwan II and the pro-Qays faction in the inter-Umayyad civil war; Umayyad authority weakened and overthrown in subsequent Abbasid Revolution	Marwan II	Abd al-Malik ibn Marwan ibn Musa ibn Nusayr	?
Abbasid revolution	Abbasid Caliphate	Umayyad Caliphate	Abbasid victory: Fall of the Umayyad dynasty and the establishment of Abbasid rule	Marwan II	Abd al-Malik ibn Marwan ibn Musa ibn Nusayr	?

== Bashmurid state (720–832) ==
Conflict	Combatant 1	Combatant 2	Results	leader	Egyptian losses
Bashmurian revolt (720)	Egyptian rebels	Umayyad Caliphate	Victory: The northern Delta area does not appear to have been under Umayyad control at the time, and may have been controlled by rebels.	Mina, son of Apacyrus	?
Bashmurian revolt (749)	Egyptian rebels	Umayyad Caliphate	Victory: The Bashmurians took Samannūd and sacked Rosetta	Mina, son of Apacyrus	?
Makurian invasion of southern Egypt	Egyptian rebels Makuria	Umayyad Caliphate	Victory: Luxor and Aswan were subjugated to Makuria	unknown	?
Bashmurian revolt (767)	Egyptian rebels Arab settlers	Abbasid Caliphate	Victory	unknown	?
Abbasid reconquest of Delta	Egyptian rebels	Abbasid Caliphate	Defeat: The Abbasids reconquered Egypt	unknown	?

== Abbasid Caliphate (750–935) ==
Conflict	Combatant 1	Combatant 2	Caliph	Egyptian losses
Sack of Damietta (853)	Abbasid Caliphate	Byzantine Empire	al-Mutawakkil	?
Tulunid loyalists rebellion	Abbasid Caliphate	Muhammad ibn Ali al-Khalanji	Al-Mu'tadid	?
Fall of the Tulunid emirate	Abbasid Caliphate	Tulunid Emirate	Al-khalanji	?
Fatimid invasion of Egypt (914–915)	Abbasid Caliphate	Fatimid Caliphate	Al-Muqtadir	10,000 to 20,000 dead
Fatimid invasion of Egypt (919–921)	Abbasid Caliphate	Fatimid Caliphate	Al-Muqtadir	?

== Tulunid Emirate (868–905) ==
Conflict	Combatant 1	Combatant 2	Results	Sultan	Egyptian losses
Alawite rebellion in Egypt	Tulunid dynasty	Alawite rebels	Victory: Revolt suppressed	Ahmad ibn Tulun	?
Second Alawite rebellion in Egypt	Tulunid dynasty	Alawite rebels	Victory: The Tulunid forces emerged triumphant, killing numerous rebels and capturing those who surrendered	Ahmad ibn Tulun	?
Tulunid-beja border conflict	Tulunid dynasty	Beja confederacy	Victory	Ahmad ibn Tulun	?
Ifriqiya campaign	Tulunid dynasty	Aghlabid dynasty	Defeat: Al-Abbas ibn Ahmad ibn Tulun defeated the local Aghlabid governor, Muhammad ibn Qurhub, sacked the town of Labda, and marched on Tripoli; Despite initial victories, Abbas was defeated by Ilyas ibn Mansur al-Nafusi in winter 880/1	Ahmad ibn Tulun	?
Barqa revolt	Tulunid dynasty	Cyrenaican rebels	Victory: Revolt suppressed	Ahmad ibn Tulun	?
Abbasid invasion of Egypt (877)	Tulunid dynasty	Abbasid Caliphate	Victory: Egypt remained independent	Ahmad ibn Tulun	?
Border Clashes with the Byzantines	Tulunid dynasty	Byzantine Empire	Victory: ibn Tulun Captures Cyprus and attacks Aegean islands	Ahmad ibn Tulun	?
Al-Abbas ibn Ahmad ibn Tulun's usurpation	Al-Abbas ibn Ahmad ibn Tulun	Loyalist troops	Loyalist victory: Abbas, with the remnants of his army, was captured outside Alexandria; Abbas was executed; Khumarawayh made heir in 882	Ahmad ibn Tulun	Abbas was commanded to execute or mutilate the most prominent of his followers
Qarmatian attack on levant	Tulunid dynasty	Qarmatians; Abbasid Caliphate	Stalemate: Status quo ante bellum	Khumarawayh	?
Tulunid invasion of hejaz	Tulunid dynasty	Abbasid Caliphate; Saffarids	Defeat	Khumarawayh	?
Tulunid-Abbasid conflict over the Levant	Tulunid dynasty	Abbasid Caliphate	Victory: Tulunids reaffirm rule over the Al-Sham region.	Khumarawayh; Sa'd al-Aysar	?
Second Abbasid conquest of Levant	Tulunid dynasty	Abbasid Caliphate	Victory: Levant still remained under tulunid rule	Khumarawayh	?
Tulunid invasion of Jazira	Tulunid dynasty	Abbasid Caliphate	Victory: Tulunids conquered Upper Mesopotamia; The caliphate added Armenia to Khumarawayh domains	Khumarawayh	?
Abbasid Caliphate invasion of Tulunid-controlled Syria and Egypt (904–905)	Tulunid dynasty	Abbasid Caliphate	Defeat: The Tulunid troops deserted; Harun ibn Khumarawayh was killed in an army mutiny; ending the rule of the Tulunids.	Harun ibn Khumarawayh Shayban ibn Ahmad ibn Tulun	?

== Ikhshidid Emirate (935–969) ==
Conflict	Combatant 1	Combatant 2	Results	Sultan	Egyptian losses
Rise of the Ikhshidid dynasty	Muhammad ibn Tughj al-Ikhshid	Ahmad ibn Kayghalagh Fatimids	Victory: The Fatimid army captured the island of al-Rawda on the Nile and burned its arsenal.; Ibn Tughj's admirals Ali ibn Badr and Bajkam defected to the Fatimids.; The Fatimids retreated from Egypt to their base at Barqa.	Al-Radi	?
Shi'ite revolt (942)	Ikhshidid dynasty	Shi'ite rebels	Victory: The revolt was swiftly suppressed	Muhammad ibn Tughj al-Ikhshid	?
Conflict with Ibn Ra'iq	Ikhshidid dynasty	Abbasid Caliphate	Stalemate: Status quo ante bellum; Abbasids failed to take over Egypt; Ikhshidids fail to take northern Syria	Muhammad ibn Tughj al-Ikhshid	?
Hamdanid invasion of the Levant	Ikhshidid dynasty	Hamdanid dynasty Abbasid Caliphate; Banu Kilab	Victory: Both sides agreed to a treaty dividing the region along the lines of the agreement with Ibn Ra'iq was concluded in October	Muhammad ibn Tughj al-Ikhshid	?
Bedouin raid on the Western desert	Ikhshidid dynasty	Bedouins	Inconclusive	Abu'l-Hasan Ali ibn al-Ikhshid	?
Nubian attacks on Egypt	Ikhshidid dynasty	Makuria	Stalemate: Status quo ante bellum	Abu'l-Hasan Ali ibn al-Ikhshid	?
Ikhshidid fleet against the Byzantine navy	Ikhshidid dynasty	Byzantine Empire	Defeat: Anti-Christian riots were provoked by a defeat of the Ikhshidid fleet against the Byzantine navy in 960/963, as well as the Byzantine offensives under Nikephoros Phokas in Cilicia and northern Syria	Abu'l-Hasan Ali ibn al-Ikhshid	?
Hejazi campaign	Ikhshidid dynasty	Hejaz	Victory	Abu al-Misk Kafur	?
Ghalbūn rebellion	Ikhshidid dynasty	Ghalbūn	Victory	Abu al-Misk Kafur	?
Ikhshidid-Makurian conflict	Ikhshidid Emirate	Makuria	Victory: Kafur al-Ikhshidi annexed Old Dongola and Qasr Ibrahim	Abu'l-Qasim Unujur ibn al-Ikhshid Abu'l-Hasan Ali ibn al-Ikhshid Kafur al-Ikhshidi	?
Qaramatian campaign in hejaz	Ikhshidid dynasty	Qarmatians	Victory: Qaramatians were exiled from Hejaz and Levant	Abu al-Misk Kafur	?
Ikhshidid-Fatimid border conflict	Ikhshidid dynasty	Fatimid Caliphate	Victory: The Fatimid were prevented from Invading Egypt for the third time	Abu al-Misk Kafur	?
Hamdanid Invasion of Syria	Ikhshidid dynasty	Hamdanid dynasty	Victory: The Hamdanid recognized the lordship of the ikhshidid dynasty over parts of Syria	Abu al-Misk Kafur	?
Fatimid conquest of Egypt	Ikhshidid dynasty	Fatimid Caliphate	Fatimid victory: Capitulation of Fustat and Egypt; Foundation of Cairo and move of the Fatimid Caliphate's seat from Ifriqiya to Egypt; Beginning of Fatimid expansion into the Levant and the Hejaz	Abu'l-Fawaris Ahmad ibn Ali	?

== Fatimid Caliphate (969–1171) ==
Conflict	Combatant 1	Combatant 2	Results	Caliph	Egyptian losses
Expansion into Syria	Fatimid Caliphate	Byzantine Empire	Victory: Fatimids take control of Palestine and south Syria while leaving Aleppo under the rule of the Byzantines	al-Aziz Billah	?
Fatimid Campaign against the Abbasids	Fatimid Caliphate	Abbasid Caliphate	Victory	al-Aziz Billah	?
First Qarmatian invasion of Egypt	Fatimid Caliphate	Qarmatians; Banu Uqayl; Tayy; Egyptian rebels	Inconclusive: Fatimid victory in Egypt; Qarmatian victory in the Levant; Fatimids remain control on Palestine and south Syria	Ja'far ibn Fallah; Jawhar	?
Second Qarmatian invasion of Egypt	Fatimid Caliphate	Qarmatians; Banu Uqayl; Tayy; Egyptian rebels	Victory: Egypt remains under Fatimid rule; Qarmatians expelled from Egypt	Ja'far ibn Fallah; Jawhar	?
Reconquest of Levant	Fatimid Caliphate	Byzantine Empire; Qarmatians; Damascus Emirate; Buyid dynasty Bedouins : Tayy; Banu Uqayl; Hamdanid dynasty	Stalemate: Manjutakin invaded the Hamdanid emirate; Conclusion of a 10-year truce in 1000 After al-Aziz Billah's death; The Fatimids lost control of Tripoli; Fatimids restore rule over the Levant	al-Aziz Billah	?
Revolt of Tyre (996–998)	Fatimid Caliphate	Citizens of Tyre; Byzantine Empire	Victory: Revolt was suppressed	al-Hakim bi-Amr Allah; Abu Abdallah al-Husayn ibn Nasir al-Dawla; Yaqut	?
Fatimid-Byzantine conflict: Battle of Apamea; Battle of the Orontes	Fatimid Caliphate	Byzantine Empire; Hamdanid dynasty	Victory	al-Hakim bi-Amr Allah; Jaysh ibn Samsama	Over 2000 dead at the battle of Apamea
Jarrahid rebellion in Palestine	Fatimid Caliphate	Jarrahids	Victory: Jarrahids were driven from Palestine.	al-Hakim bi-Amr Allah	?
Hejazi uprising of 1010	Fatimid Caliphate	Abu'l-Futuh al-Hasan ibn Ja'far (including tribes in the Hejaz and some Syrian allies)	Victory: Fatimid control over the Hejaz was restored, and the revolt ended by 1012 CE.	al-Hakim bi-Amr Allah	?
Abu Rakwa's revolt	Fatimid Caliphate	Abu Rakwa; Supported by: Banu Qurra	Victory: Abu Rakwa was sent to Cairo and got executed	al-Hakim bi-Amr Allah	?
Bedouin revolt in Palestine and Syria	Fatimid Caliphate	Bedouin Confederation	Victory: Revolt was suppressed brutally	al-Zahir li-I'zaz Din Allah	?
Conquest of Aleppo	Fatimid Caliphate	Emirate of Aleppo	Victory: Aleppo was annexed by the Fatimids	al-Hakim bi-Amr Allah	?
Expansion through Arabia	Fatimid Caliphate; Sharifate of Mecca	Bedouin rioters Qarmatians(uncertain or minor involvement)	Victory	al-Aziz Billah	?
Persecution of the Druze	Fatimid Caliphate	Druze	Inconclusive: 5,000 prominent Druze were killed in Antioch, followed by that of Aleppo.; The Druze movement was able to resume two years after the death of al-Zahir	Al-Zahir li-I'zaz Din Allah	?
Bedouin revolt (1023–1029)	Fatimid Caliphate; Banu Kalb; Banu Fazara	Banu Kilab (Mirdasid dynasty); Tayy (Jarrahids)	Victory	al-Mustansir Billah	?
Nizar's rebellion	Loyalists	Nizar ibn al-Mustansir	Loyalist Victory: Nizar's forces were placed under siege, until Nizar and his remaining followers were forced to surrender.; Nizar was immured and left to die	Al-Musta'li	?
Seljuk invasion of the levant	Fatimid Caliphate	Seljuk Empire: Governors of Damascus; Abbasid Caliphate	Victory: Invasion repelled	Al-Musta'li	?
Laguatan invasion of Egypt	Fatimid Caliphate	Laguatan Berbers	Victory: Laguatan Berbers were driven back and forced to pay tribute	Al-Musta'li	?
Fatimid invasion of Yemen	Fatimid Caliphate	Sulayhid dynasty: Banu Hamdan	Victory: ibn Najib al-Dawla had become the virtual ruler of the parts of Yemen recognizing Fatimid suzerainty	Al-Musta'li	?
First Crusade	Muslim States; Seljuk Empire; Emirate of Rum; Danishmendids; Fatimid Caliphate	Crusader armies Army of Raymond of Saint-Gilles; Army of Godfrey of Bouillon; Army of Robert Curthose; Army of Robert II of Flanders; Army of Hugh the Great; Armies of Bohemond of Taranto; Armies of the People's Crusade; Byzantine Empire	Defeat: The Crusade assists in capturing Nicaea, restoring much of western Anatolia to the Byzantine Empire; The Crusaders successfully capture Jerusalem and establish the Crusader states	Al-Musta'li	12,700 at least
Venetian Crusade	Fatimid Caliphate; Burid dynasty	Republic of Venice; Kingdom of Jerusalem; County of Tripoli	Defeat: Tyre captured by Jerusalem	Al-Amir bi-Ahkam Allah	4,000
Second Crusade	Fatimid Caliphate; Seljuk Empire; Almoravid dynasty	Kingdom of Jerusalem; Byzantine Empire; County of Tripoli; Principality of Antioch; Knights Hospitaller; Knights Templar; Armenian Principality of Cilicia; Kingdom of France; Kingdom of Portugal; Holy Roman Empire; County of Barcelona; Kingdom of England; Byzantine Empire; Kingdom of Castile and León	Inconclusive: Lisbon captured by the Portuguese; Tarragona and Tortosa captured by the Catalans	Al-Amir bi-Ahkam Allah	?
Crusader invasion of Egypt (1163–1169)	Fatimid Caliphate	Kingdom of Jerusalem; Byzantine Empire; County of Tripoli; Principality of Antioch; Knights Hospitaller; Knights Templar; Armenian Principality of Cilicia; French crusaders Zengid dynasty	Victory: Crusaders withdraw from Egypt; Fatimid-Crusader border changed; Later establishment of the Ayyubid dynasty; Zengids seize Egypt	Al-Adid	?
Fatimid-Zengid conflict	Kingdom of Jerusalem Fatimid Caliphate	Zengid dynasty	Peace treaty: Both the Crusaders and Shirkuh's Zengid troops departed Egypt after the payment of tribute from the Fatimid treasury.	Al-Adid	?
Revolt of the Blacks	Fatimid Caliphate: Black-African Elites of the Fatimid army; Fatimid Officials in Cairo; Pro-Fatimid citizens of Cairo	Ayyubid Sultanate: Saladin's Syrian, Kurdish and Turkish forces; Pro-Ayyubid Egyptian rebels	Ayyubid victory: Decline and later fall of the Fatimid Caliphate in 1171; Founding and Establishment of the Ayyubid Sultanate of Egypt	Al-Adid	?

== Ayyubid Sultanate (1171–1250) ==
Conflict	Combatant 1	Combatant 2	Results	Sultan	Egyptian losses
Ayyubid conquest of North Africa	Ayyubid dynasty Banu Ghaniya	Almohad Berbers tribes	Victory: Sharaf al-Din Qaraqush captured Siwa in 1172 and Cyrenaica in 1173.; Qaraqush conquers Tripoli in the 1170s/early 1180s.; Qaraqush's forces went on to capture most of Ifriqiya from the Almohads by 1185–1186.	Saladin	?
Ayyubid conquest of Fezzan	Ayyubid dynasty	Banu Khattab	Victory: Zawila was sacked and conquered by the Armenian-Mamluk Qaraqush.	Saladin	?
Ayyubid conquest of Nubia	Ayyubid dynasty	Banu Kanz; Makuria	Victory: Turan-Shah conquered northern Nubia after capturing the town of Ibrim.	Saladin	?
Almohad reconquest of Ifriqiya	Ayyubid dynasty Banu Ghaniya	Almohad	Defeat: The Almohad caliph Yaqub al-Mansur reconquered Ifriqiya from 1187 to 1188.; The Ayyubids made no further attempts to intervene in the Maghreb after this.	Saladin	?
Ayyubid conquest of Yemen and Hejaz	Ayyubid dynasty	Arab tribes Hamdanid	Victory: In May 1174, Turan-Shah conquered Zabid and later that year captured Aden.; Ayyubids implemented a new tax which was collected by galleys.; Turan-Shah drove out the remaining Hamdanid rulers of Sana'a, conquering the mountainous city in 1175.; Uthman al-Zandjili, conquered the greater part of Hadramaut in 1180.; Saladin effectively established Egypt's hegemony in the region	Saladin	?
Ayyubid conquest of Syria and Upper Mesopotamia	Ayyubid dynasty	Zengid; Kingdom of Jerusalem; Knights Templar	Victory: Saladin gains the title of "Sultan of Egypt and Syria"	Saladin	?
Battle of Hattin	Ayyubid Sultanate	Kingdom of Jerusalem; County of Tripoli; Knights Templar; Principality of Antioch; Knights Hospitaller; Order of St. Lazarus; Order of Mountjoy	Victory: Saladin conquers Acre, Nazareth, Saffuriya, Haifa, Caesarea, Sebastia and Nablus, while al-Adil conquered Mirabel and Jaffa.; On 26 July, Saladin returned to the coast and received the surrender of Sarepta, Sidon, Beirut, and Jableh.; In August, the Ayyubids conquered Ramla, Darum, Gaza, Bayt Jibrin, and Latrun.; Ascalon was taken on 4 September.; In September–October 1187, the Ayyubids besieged Jerusalem, taking possession of it on 2 October, after negotiations with Balian of Ibelin; Karak and Mont Real in Transjordan soon fell, followed by Safad in the northeastern Galilee.; By the end of 1187 the Ayyubids were in control of virtually the entire Crusader kingdom in the Levant with the exception of Tyre	Saladin	?
Third Crusade (1189–1192)	Ayyubid Sultanate; Sultanate of Rum; Nizari Ismaili state (the Assassins); Byzantine Empire; Cyprus	Angevin Empire; Holy Roman Empire; Kingdom of Hungary; Republic of Genoa; Kingdom of Navarre; Republic of Pisa; Kingdom of Jerusalem; Principality of Antioch; Knights Templar; Knights Hospitaller; Teutonic Order	Stalemate: Treaty of Jaffa; Crusader military Victory, resulting in a three-year truce. Acre, Philomelion, Iconium, Arsuf, and Jaffa all Crusader military victories.; Recognition of the territorial status quo at the end of active campaigning, including continued Muslim control of Jerusalem and the restoration of the Levantine to the Crusader States Crusader States.; The safety of both Christian and Muslim unarmed pilgrims guaranteed throughout the Levant.; The Crusader Captures Cyprus and the Kingdom of Cyprus is established; The Levantine coast from Tyre to Jaffa returned to Crusader control; The Crusaders recapture Tiberias and some inland territories from the Muslims	Saladin	?
Crusade of 1197 (1197–1198)	Ayyubids	Holy Roman Empire; Kingdom of Cyprus; Duchy of Brabant; Duchy of Austria; Landgraviate of Thuringia; County Palatine of the Rhine; Duchy of Merania; Bishopric of Passau; Bishopric of Hildesheim; Bishopric of Halberstadt; County of Gorizia	Indecisive: Beirut restored to the Kingdom of Jerusalem; Jaffa recaptured by the Ayyubids after the Third Crusade; Crusaders fail to recapture Jerusalem	Al-Aziz Uthman	?
Al-Aziz's attack on Syria	Ayyubid Sultanate of Egypt	Ayyubid Emirate of Damascus	Inconclusive: Status quo maintained.	Al-Aziz Uthman	?
Al-Adil's Usurpation	Al-Mansur Nasir al-Din Muhammad; Supported by: Al-Adil I; the Salahiyya	Al-Afdal ibn Salah ad-Din	Victory for Al-Adil and his allies: Al-Adil became the dominant ruler within the Ayyubid dynasty, paving the way for his accession as sultan in 1200.	Al-Adil I	?
Fifth Crusade (1217–1221)	Muslim forces: Ayyubid Sultanate	Crusaders: Holy Roman Empire; Kingdom of Portugal; Kingdom of Hungary; Kingdom of France; Kingdom of Germany; Levant: Kingdom of Jerusalem; Kingdom of Cyprus; Latin Empire; Military orders: Knights Templar; Teutonic Order; Knights Hospitaller	Victory: 8-year truce between the Ayyubids and the Crusaders	Al-Kamil	?
Sixth Crusade (1227–1229)	Ayyubids of Egypt; Ayyubids of Damascus	Holy Roman Empire; Teutonic Knights; Kingdom of Sicily	Defeat: Treaty of Jaffa; Jerusalem given back to the Crusaders; Jerusalem, Nazareth, Sidon, Jaffa and Bethlehem relinquished to Crusaders.	Al-Kamil	?
Baron's Crusade (1239–1241)	Ayyubids of Damascus Ayyubids of Egypt	Kingdom of Jerusalem; French and Navarre crusaders English crusaders County of Habsburg Military orders: Knights Templar; Knights Hospitaller; Teutonic Order	Defeat: Kingdom of Jerusalem returned to largest size since 1187; Christians negotiated return of Jerusalem, Ascalon, Sidon, Tiberias, most of Galilee, Bethlehem, and Nazareth	As-Salih Ayyub	?

== Mamluk Sultanate (1250–1517) ==
Conflict	Combatant 1	Combatant 2	Results	Sultan	Egyptian losses
Seventh Crusade (1248–1254)	Ayyubid Dynasty; Bahris	Kingdom of France; Kingdom of Jerusalem; Knights Templar; Knights Hospitaller; Kingdom of Navarre	Victory: Status quo ante bellum	Aybak	?
Battle of al-Kura (1251)	Mamluks of Egypt	Ayyubids of Syria	Mamluk victory: Faris al-Din Aktay led an attack on Palestine and captured Gaza.; The Mamluks were able to stabilize their rule in Egypt, while the Ayyubids remained limited to Syria.; Through the mediation of Caliph al-Musta'sim, this situation was deepened in a contract between Damascus and Cairo in April 1253, and Gaza was also returned to An-Nasir Yusuf.	Aybak	?
Mongol invasions of the Levant (1244–1323): Mongol invasion of 1244; Mongol invasion of 1260; Battle of Ain Jalut; Homs; Rebellion at Mosul; Mongol invasion of 1271; Mongol invasion of 1280–81; Ravage of Aleppo (1271); Homs; Mamluk–Ilkhanid War; Wadi al-Khaznadar; Marj al-Saffar (1303); Mongol incursion of 1312; Siege of al-Rahba	Mamluk Sultanate; Ayyubid remnants Nizari Ismailis of Syria; Golden Horde (after 1264); Karamanid rebels	Ilkhanate: Cilician Armenia; Kingdom of Georgia; Seljuk Sultanate of Rum; Principality of Antioch; County of Tripoli; Golden Horde (before 1264); Kingdom of Jerusalem; Knights Templar; Knights Hospitaller	Victory: Mongols expelled from Syria due to successive defeats at Ain Jalut, twice at Homs, at Shaqhab and al-Rahba, despite a phyrric victory at Wadi al-Khaznadar.; Mongols never attempt to invade the Levant after 1312, until the arrival of Timur.	Qutuz Baybars Sayf al-Din Salar Baybars II Qalawun Al-Nasir Muhammad	As per known sources: 1,000–5,000 at Wadi Al-Khaznadar.; 1,000 at Marj Al-Saffar.; Massive civilian casualties due to subsequent Mongol raids.
Mamluk expeditions to the Levant and Anatolia (1265–1277)	Mamluk Sultanate	Cilician Armenia; Knights Templar; Ilkhanate; County of Tripoli; Isma'ili Shia Assassins	Victory: Baybars launched expeditions against the Crusader fortresses throughout Syria, capturing Arsuf in 1265, and Halba and Arqa in 1266.; Baybars pillages numerous Armenian villages.; Baybars captured Safed from the Knights Templar, and shortly after, Ramla, both cities in interior Palestine.; In 1268, the Mamluks captured Jaffa before conquering the Crusader stronghold of Antioch.; In 1271, Baybars captured the major Krak des Chevaliers fortress from the Crusader County of Tripoli; In 1277, Baybars launched an expedition against the Ilkhanids, routing them in Elbistan in Anatolia, but withdrew to avoid overstretching his forces and risk being cut off from Syria by a larger incoming Ilkhanid army.	Baybars	?
Baybars's expedition to the Horn of Africa(1265–1276)	Mamluk Sultanate	Kingdom of Makuria Kingdom of al-Abwab	Victory: In 1265, the Mamluks invaded northern Makuria, forcing the Nubian king to become their vassal.; Baybars conquers the Red Sea areas of Suakin and the Dahlak Archipelago.; In 1268, the Makurian king, David I, overthrew the Mamluks' vassal and in 1272, raided the Mamluk Red Sea port of Aydhab.; In 1276, the Mamluks defeated King David of Makuria in the Battle of Dongola and installed their ally Shakanda as king. This brought the fortress of Qasr Ibrim under Mamluk suzerainty.; The Mamluks received the submission of King Adur of al-Abwab further south.	Baybars	?
Fall of Outremer (1268–1302)	Mamluk Sultanate; Order of Assassins	Kingdom of Jerusalem; Kingdom of Cyprus; Principality of Antioch; Ilkhanate; Armenian Kingdom of Cilicia; Georgian Bagratids; Tyre; Templars Hospitallers Teutonic Knights; Kingdom of France; Kingdom of England; Kingdom of Sicily Byzantine Empire	Victory: The Mamluks capture all Crusade possessions in the Holy Land	Baibars; Qalawun; Khalil; Al-Nasir Muhammad	?
Ninth Crusade (1271–1272)	Mamluk Sultanate	Kingdom of England; County of Luxembourg; Cilician Armenia; Kingdom of Cyprus; Kingdom of Jerusalem; Antioch-Tripoli; Knights Templar; Knights Hospitaller; Teutonic Order; Ilkhanate	Inconclusive: Jerusalem remains under Mamluks control; Arsuf, Safed, Jaffa, Antioch, Krak des Chevaliers, captured by the Mamluks; Treaty of Caesarea; Siege of Tripoli lifted; Ten-year truce between Mamluks and Crusaders	Baibars	?
Fourth battle of Dongola (1287)	Mamluk Sultanate	Kingdom of Makuria	Victory: Spread of Islam in lower Nubia (Sudan); Izz al-Din places a puppet on Makurian throne; Capture of Makurian capital	Qalawun Izz al-Din al-Kawrani	?
Alexandrian Crusade (1365)	Mamluk Sultanate	Kingdom of Cyprus; Republic of Venice; Knights Hospitaller	Defeat: The Cypriots controlled the city for 3 days and then abandoned it	Al-Ashraf Sha'ban	?
Zahiri Revolt (August 1386)	Mamluk Sultanate (Burji Mamluks)	Zahirite rebels Syrian Bedouin tribes.	Victory: Revolt suppressed.	Barquq	None
Capture of Baghdad (1394)	Mamluk Sultanate Jalayirid Sultanate	Timurid Empire	Victory: Baghdad remains under Jalayirid rule.; Timur expelled from Baghdad.	Barquq (de jure) Saad al-Din bin Ghurab (de facto)	?
Bayezid I's Anatolian campaigns	Beylik of Karaman Beylik of Aydin; Beylik of Saruhan Beylik of Hamid: Beylik of Teke; Beylik of Menteshe; Beylik of Germiyan; Principality of Kadi Burhan Al-Din; Mamluk Sultanate	Ottoman Empire Byzantine Empire (Serbia) Serbian Despotate; Candar dynasty	Defeat: Bayazid captures all Turkish Beyliks siding with the Mamluks.; Bayezid I besieges and captures Malatya.; Ottomans conquered Kahta, Divriği, Behisni, Darende, Elbistan, and Hısnı Mansur, which belonged to the Mamluks.	Barquq An-Nasir Faraj	* All soldiers defending Malatya.
Timurid Invasion of the Mamluk Sultanate: Siege of Damascus (1400); Sack of Aleppo (1400)	Mamluk Sultanate	Timurid Empire	Defeat: Timur defeats the Mamluk Sultan An-Nasir Faraj in a battle outside Damascus.; Timur sacks Aleppo and Damascus.	An-Nasir Faraj	* 50,000 killed, 30,000 of them were burned in Damascus.: Civilians of Aleppo massacred after war.
Boucicaut's expedition to the Levant (1403)	Mamluk Sultanate	Kingdom of France; Republic of Genoa; Knights Hospitaller	Victory • The campaign resulted in enmity between the Venetians and Genoa. • The Boucicaut expedition to the Levant failed to reconquer any city in the holy land.	Al-Mu'ayyad Shaykh	?
Mamluk campaigns against Cyprus (1424–1426)	Mamluk Sultanate	Kingdom of Cyprus	Victory: Cyprus becomes a tributary state	Barsbay	?
Ottoman–Mamluk War (1485–1491)	Mamluk Sultanate Supported By: Vasak tribe Turgudlu tribe	Ottoman Empire: Beylik of Dulkadir; Karamanids Supported By: Ramazanids	Victory: Status quo ante bellum	Qaitbay	?
Mamluk-Portuguese War (1505–1517)	Mamluk Sultanate; Supported by: Republic of Venice; Kingdom of Calicut; Ottoman Empire	Portuguese Empire	Defeat: Portuguese dominance of most of the Indian Ocean secured.; The Mamluk Sultanate becomes financially crippled.; Failed Portuguese invasion of the Red Sea.; The Portuguese assert dominance over most of the Indian Ocean region and the spice trade.	Al-Ashraf Qansuh al-Ghawri	?
Mamluk-Tahirid war (1515–1517)	Mamluk Sultanate	Tahirid Sultanate	Victory: The entire Tahirid realm fell under the Mamluks with the exception of Aden; Mamluk fleet sets up a tributary regime in Zabid	Al-Ashraf Qansuh al-Ghawri	?
Ottoman–Mamluk Conflict (1516–1517): Capture of the Beylik of Dulkadir; Battle of Turnadağ; War with the Ottomans; Battle of Marj Dabiq; Battle of Yaunis Khan; Battle of Ridaniya	Mamluk Sultanate: Beylik of Dulkadir	Ottoman Empire; Mamluk Turncoats: Yunus Bey; Janbirdi Ghazali (WIA); Hayır Bey	Defeat: Annexation of the Mamluk Sultanate by the Ottoman Empire; Fall of the Mamluk Sultanate and Abbasid Caliphate of Cairo; Proclamation of the Ottoman Caliphate	Al-Ashraf Qansuh al-Ghawri Tuman Bay II	7,000–65,000 killed, 2,000 executed at Marj Dabiq. 5,000–6,000 killed, 2,000–3,000 captured at Yaunis Khan. 7,000 at Ridanya. Total losses: 88,000–160,000 (including civilians)

== Ottoman Egypt (1517–1803) ==
Conflict	Combatant 1	Combatant 2	Results	Head of State	Egyptian losses
Rebellion of Hain Ahmed Pasha (January 1524)	Ottoman Empire	Principality of Hain Ahmed Pasha: Egypt Eyalet	Victory: Death of Hain Ahmed Pasha.; Egypt again becomes a part of the Ottoman Empire.	Suleiman the Magnificent	?
The Mamluk-Circassian Revolt (May 1523)	Ottoman Empire	Mamluk lords and chiefs: Circassian chieftains.	Victory: Uprising suppressed.	Suleiman the Magnificent	?
Sipahi Mutiny in Egypt (1604–1609)	Ottoman Empire: Maktul Hacı Ibrahim Pasha X; Hadım Mehmed Pasha; Yemenli Hasan Pasha; Öküz Mehmed Pasha; Pasha's loyalists.; Bedouin tribes	Egyptian Sipahi Corps Mamluk Appointees: Mamluk Slave Soldiers	Victory: The illegal tulba protection tax is abolished.; Öküz Mehmed Pasha defeats the rebels in a battle north of Cairo.; Mehmed became known as Kul Kıran "slavebreaker".	Ahmed I	?
Spanish–Ottoman wars	Ottoman Empire; Regency of Algiers; Ait Abbas; Kuku; Eyalet of Tunis; Ottoman Tripolitania; Egypt; Yemen Eyalet; Habesh Eyalet; Basra Eyalet; Sultanate of Aceh; Eyalet of Bosnia; Eastern Hungary; Transylvania; Moldavia; Wallachia; Crimean Khanate; Barbary corsairs Supported by: France; Dutch Republic; Kingdom of England; Saadi Sultanate; Sulu Sultanate; Maguindanao; Bruneian Empire; Sultanate of Ternate; Adal Sultanate; Kathiri Sultanate; Ajuran Sultanate; Gujarat Sultanate; Deccan Sultanates; Ahmadnagar Sultanate; Sultanate of Bijapur; Zamorin of Calicut; Huguenots; Protestant German dissidents Morisco/Mudejar dissidents Marrano/Sephardic dissidents	Spain: Naples; Sicily; Duchy of Milan; Spanish Tripoli; Spanish Oran; Spanish Netherlands; New Spain; Viceroyalty of Peru; Philippines; Portugal: Portuguese India; Mozambique; Papal States; (Sovereign Military Order of Malta) Order of Malta; Republic of Venice; Republic of Ragusa; Holy Roman Empire: Savoy; Republic of Genoa; Florentine Republic; Tuscany; Mantua; Montferrat; Ferrara; Urbino; (Electorate of Bavaria) Bavaria; Austria; (Bohemia) Bohemian Crown; Duchy of Carniola; Flanders; Hungary; Croatia; Holy Leagues; Supported by: Kingdom of Kartli; Ethiopian Empire (Polish–Lithuanian Commonwealth) Poland–Lithuania; Tsardom of Russia; Montenegro; Serbian dissidents; Greek dissidents; Albanian dissidents; Safavid Iran; Hafsid Tunisia; Kingdom of Tlemcen (Zayyanids); Sultanate of Tidore; Saadi Sultanate	Inconclusive Full territorial changes: Divisio Imperii instead of Imperium Universale between Holy Roman Empire and Ottoman Empire, in which both mutually recognise the other to be Roman Emperors. End of Charles V and Suleiman the Magnificent aspirations for world domination or at least Indo-Mediterranean.; Repartition of Sphere of Influences between both empires: Western Mediterranean, Southern Europe and East Indies for Iberians and Catholics. Eastern Mediterranean, North Africa and Middle East for Ottomans and Muslims.; Turkish conquest of Cyprus, Crete, Morea, Ottoman Algeria, Ottoman Tunisia, Ottoman Libya and Habesh Eyalet.; Deposition of Hafsids, Zayyanids and other anti-Ottoman Maghrebi dynasties; Spanish Conquest of Spanish Oran, Peñón de Vélez de la Gomera, Melilla and Philippines are recognised by Ottomans.; Expulsion of the Moriscos and Mudejar community from Southern Spain by the Spanish branch, exterminating the historical presence of Muslims in Spain since Umayyad times to ensure Reconquista and end all Islamic hopes of restoring Al Andalus.; Portuguese Conquest of Ceuta, Tangier, Mazagan, Portuguese India and Portuguese Insulindia are recognised by Ottomans.; Conquest of Hungary-Croatia by the Austrian branch of Habsburg Monarchy; Safavid Persia consolidates its western borders, expelling both Ottomans from Caspian Sea and Portuguese from Persian Gulf.; Independence of Morocco and Hospitaller Malta as buffer states.; Decadence of Venetian colonies, Genoese colonies, Barbary Coast, Ethiopian Empire, Gujarat Sultanate, Aceh Sultanate, Bruneian Empire, Sultanate of Ternate, Sulu Sultanate, Sultanate of Maguindanao.; Catholic Evangelisation of Goa, East Timor and Philippines.; Dutch Colonial Empire and English Colonial Empire consolidates in the Indian Ocean (Indonesia and India) in detriment of both exhausted Great Powers, dominating Indian Ocean trade against local Muslims and Catholics.; Rise of Russian Empire in the Balkans in detriment of Habsburg Monarchy and Poland-Lithuania.	Lala Mustafa Pasha	?
Ottoman–Portuguese conflicts (1538–1560)	Ottoman Empire Supported by: Adal Sultanate; Gujarat Sultanate; Egypt	Portuguese Empire: Kingdom of Hormuz; Supported by: Ethiopian Empire; Kathiri Sultanate	Stalemate: Status quo ante bellum	Hadım Suleiman Pasha	?
Ottoman–Ethiopian War (1557–1589)	Ottoman Empire • Egypt Eyalet • Yemen Eyalet; Medri Bahri; Adal Sultanate	(Ethiopian Empire) Ethiopian Empire; Supported by: Portuguese Empire	Victory: Peace treaty signed; Ottoman victory in the coastline; Decline and dissolution of the Adal Sultanate; Establishment of Habesh Eyalet in Hergigo and Massawa; The establishment of Ottoman Zeila; Annexation of an Eritrean port by the Ottomans	Koca Sinan Pasha	?
Rebellion during the governorship of Mehmed Pasha (1657–1660)	Ottoman Empire Ottoman Egypt: Pasha's loyalists	(Ottoman Empire) Rebel Janissary Corps: Mamluk lords	Victory: Uprising suppressed.; Şehsuvarzade Mehmed Pasha began to be referred to as a gazi.	Mehmed IV	?
Gradually, the Mamluks gained power in Egypt which led to conflicts among them. Ottoman Governers lost power and influence and Mamluk titles such as "shaykh-al-balad" developed.
Mamluk Civil Wars (1711–1739): Faqariya-Qasimiya (1711); Qazdughlia-Qasimiya (1730); Qazdughlia-Faqariya (1739)	Faqariya-Qasimiya conflict: Faqariya Mamluks: Shirkas Bey #; Dhu-'l-Fiqar X; Uthman Bey; (Ottoman Empire) Janissaries Qazdughlia-Qasimiya conflict: Qazdughlia Mamluks: Ibrahim Ketkhuda; Ridwan Ketkhuda; Qazdughlia-Faqariya conflict: Qazdughlia Mamluks: Ibrahim Ketkhuda; Ridwan Ketkhuda	Faqariya-Qasimiya conflict: Qasimiya Mamluks: Qasim Iywaz †; Ismail Bey X; (Ottoman Empire) Ottoman army ojaqs Qazdughlia Mamluks Qazdughlia-Qasimiya conflict: Qasimiya Mamluks Qazdughlia-Faqariya conflict: Faqariya Mamluks: Uthman Bey	Qazdughlia Victory: The Faqariya-Qasimiya conflict ends in a victory for the Qasimiya faction.; Qazdughlia-Qasimiya conflict conflict ends in a victory for the Qazdughlia faction in 1730.; Qazdughlia leader Ibrahim Ketkhuda drove out the head of the Faqariya leader Uthman Bey in 1739.; Ibrahim Ketkhuda becomes shaykh-al-balad.; Ibrahim Ketkhuda shares power with the leader of the Julfiyya Mamluks.; Ottoman Empire stays defensive throughout the conflict.	Ahmed III Mahmud I	?
Mamluk-Bedouin conflict	Mamluks of Ali Bey	Bedouin tribals	Inconclusive: Ali bey frequently raids Bedouin tribes.; Ali bey was nicknamed Jinn Ali or Balut Kapan by people.	Mahmud I	?
Mamluk succession conflicts: Early Succession conflicts (1754–60); Ali bey's Succession conflicts (1760–69)	Combatants separated by lines: Ibrahim Ketkhuda X Succeeded by: Ridwan Ketkhuda Ousted by: Uthman Bey al-Jirjawi; Supported by: Ali Bey al-Kabir Ousted by: Husayn Bey al-Sabunji Ousted by: Ali Bey al-Ghazzawi; Supported by: Ali Bey al-Kabir; Husayn Bey Kashkash Ousted by: Ali Bey al-Kabir; Supported by: Abd al-Rahman Ketkhuda		Inconclusive: Conflict merges into Ali Bey's succession conflicts.	Osman III Mustafa III	?
Ali Bey's succession conflicts (1760–1769)	Ali Bey al-Kabir: Ali Bey's loyalists; (Ottoman Empire) (Palestine) Daher al-Umar; (Ottoman Empire) (Palestine) Umar's loyalists; Hawwara tribe; Sheikh Humam; Salih bey's Qasimiya Mamluks; Supported by: Koca Ragıp Pasha After becoming shaykh-al-balad: Rakım Mehmed Pasha; Abu al-Dhahab; Salih Bey; Ismail Bey; Ayyub Bey; Hasan Bey Ridwan	Abd al-Rahman Ketkhuda: Rahman's loyalists; Ottoman government: Hamza Pasha; Pasha's loyalists; Husayn Bey Kashkash; Khalil Bey al-Daftardar; Janissaries; Ottoman army ojaqs; Rakım Mehmed Pasha; Pasha's loyalists; After becoming shaykh-al-balad: Ali Bey Jinn X Hasan Bey X Khalil Bey al-Daftardar (executed); Husayn Bey Kashkash (executed); Salih Bey X: Salih Bey's Mamluks	Ali Bey's Victory: Ali bey secures the title of shaykh-al-balad.; Ali bey consolidates control over Egypt.	Mustafa III	?

== Beylik of Egypt (1769–1786) ==
Conflict	Combatant 1	Combatant 2	Results	Head of State	Egyptian losses
Ali Bey's Declaration of Independence (1769)	Beylik of Egypt	Ottoman Empire	Victory: Mamluks return to absolute power.; Formation of the Beylik of Egypt.	Ali Bey al-Kabir	?
Russo-Turkish War (1768–1774)	Russian Empire: Collegium of Little Russia 1764–1786 (former Hetmanate); Zaporozhian Host; Kalmyk Khanate; Kingdom of Kartli-Kakheti; Kabardia (Note: Turkish-Crimean Invasion of Kabarda (1774)); Kingdom of Imereti; Beylik of Egypt; Emirate of Palestine Greek insurgents Maniots	Ottoman Empire: Crimean Khanate; Emirate of Mount Lebanon; Pashalik of Scutari; Beylik of Egypt; Emirate of Palestine; Circassia Bar Confederation	Victory: Treaty of Küçük Kaynarca.; Ottoman Empire cedes Kerch, Enikale and part of Yedisan to Russia.; Crimean Khanate becomes a Russian client state.	Ali Bey al-Kabir	?
Subjugation of the Hawwara	Beylik of Egypt	Hawwara tribesmen.	Victory: Lands between Aswan and Asyut recovered.	Ali Bey al-Kabir	?
Campaigns in the Hejaz (1770)	Beylik of Egypt	Ottoman Empire: Hejaz Vilayet; Local Arab tribes.	Victory: Ismail Bey invades the Hejaz and subdues all of its ports and coastal towns north of Jeddah.; Abu al-Dhahab and Hasan Bey seize the Hejaz, occupying Jeddah and Mecca.; Ismail Bey occupies Aqaba, al-Wajh, Yanbu and Rabigh.; Ali Bey's cousin is made the Sharif of Mecca.; Ali Bey earns the title of Sultan of Egypt and Khan of the Two Seas.	Ali Bey al-Kabir	?
Pro-Ottoman Revolts in Egypt (1768–69)	Beylik of Egypt	Pro-Ottoman Rebels Supported by:- Ottoman Empire	Victory: Abu al-Dhahab suppressed a pro-Ottoman revolt in Upper Egypt in 1769.; Ismail Bey suppressed a pro-Ottoman revolt in Lower Egypt in 1768.	Ali Bey al-Kabir	?
First Syrian Campaign (1770)	Beylik of Egypt Emirate of Palestine: Metawali allies	Ottoman Empire: Damascus Eyalet; Tripoli Eyalet; Intelligence support: (Palestine) Jarrar family of Sanur Wuhaydat Bedouins: Salit Bey †; Sardiyya Bedouins	Inconclusive: Campaign abandoned prematurely.; Ismail Bey takes over Qabatiya and gained the capitulations of other rural chiefs.	Ali Bey al-Kabir	?
Second Syrian Campaign (1771)	Beylik of Egypt Emirate of Palestine: Metawali allies; Zaydani allies; Maghrebi allies; Safadiyya fighters; Supported by: Russian Empire: Russian Navy	Ottoman Empire: Damascus Eyalet; Sidon Eyalet; Aleppo Eyalet; Forces from Kilis Sanjak; Forces from Antakya Sanjak; Forces from Aintab Sanjak; Troops of Urfa; Local defenders; Ottoman Military; Janissary Corps; Yerliyya Corps; Kapıkulu Infantry; Timariot Sipahis; Zu'ama Cavalry; Dalatiyya Kurds; Lawand irregulars; Druze Emirs.	Victory: Abu al-Dhahab gained the capitulations of Palestinian governors siding with Uthman Pasha.; Abu al-Dhahab and allies crush Uthman Pasha at Darayya.; Fall of Damascus and Sidon.; Abu al-Dhahab becomes the governor of Damascus.	Ali Bey al-Kabir	?
Conflict of Daher and Uthman Pasha (1771)	Emirate of Palestine: Metawali allies; Zaydani allies; Maghrebi allies; Safadiyya fighters; Beylik of Egypt: Mamluk forces.; Ali bey's Navy	Ottoman Empire: Damascus Eyalet; Sidon Eyalet; Tripoli Eyalet; Defensive only: (Palestine) Jarrar family of Sanur Druze Emirs.: Yusuf Shihab; Ali Jumblatt; Alleged: Abu al-Dhahab: Mamluk forces.	Victory: Daher al-Umar and allies crush Uthman Pasha at the Battle of Lake Huleh.; Daher al-Umar and allies defeat Yusuf Shihab at Nabatieh.; Daher al-Umar and allies recapture Gaza, Ramla, Jaffa and Sidon.; Uthman Pasha and sons are dismissed from office.	Ali Bey al-Kabir	?
Abu al-Dhahab's Mutiny (1772)	Beylik of Egypt: Ali Bey al-Kabir; Mamluk forces.; Ali Bey's loyalists.; Intelligence Support: Emirate of Palestine	Opposition to Ali Bey: Abu al-Dhahab; Mamluk forces; Bedouin tribals; Ismail Bey; Mamluk forces; Alleged: Ottoman Empire: Damascus Eyalet	Defeat: Abu al-Dhahab and loyalists withdraw from Syria.; Conflict between Daher and Uthman Pasha takes place.; Abu al-Dhahab occupies Asyut.; Forces sent by Ali Bey defect to Abu al-Dhahab.; Ali Bey flees Egypt.; Abu al-Dhahab becomes shaykh-al-balad.	Ali Bey al-Kabir	?
Ali Bey's Insurgency in Egypt and Syria (1772)	Egypt: Beylik of Egypt: Mamluk forces.; Dhahab's loyalists.; Syria: Ottoman Empire: Damascus Eyalet; Maghrebi allies; Beirut Sanjak; Local fighters; Wuhaydat Bedouins	Insurgents: Mamluk forces; Ali Bey's loyalists.; Emirate of Palestine: Umar's loyalists; Metawali allies; Zaydani allies; Maghrebi allies; Supported by: Russian Empire: Russian Navy; Albanian forces	Victory: Abu al-Dhahab and allies crush Ali Bey at al-Salihiyya; Salibi al-Daher and Ahmad Bey Tantawi are slain, while Ali Bey is critically wounded.; Ali Bey falls captive to Abu al-Dhahab.; Abu al-Dhahab secures his position as shaykh-al-balad.	Muhammad Bey Abu al-Dhahab	?
Syrian Campaign of Abu Dhahab	Beylik of Egypt: Mamluk forces.; English forces.; Maghrebi defectors.; Dhahab's loyalists.; Ottoman Empire: Ottoman Sultanate; Egypt Eyalet; Intelligence support: Druze and Metawali emirs: Yusuf Shihab	Emirate of Palestine: Umar's loyalists; Metawali allies; Druze allies; Maghrebi allies; (Palestine) Jarrar family of Sanur; Supported by: Ottoman allies: Damascus Eyalet; Gaza Sanjak (surrendered); Sidon Eyalet; Sidon-Beirut Sanjak (surrendered); Acre Sanjak (surrendered)	Victory: Dissolution of Daher's Emirate.; Captivity of Ahmad Agha al-Dinkizli.; Fall of Palestine to Abu al-Dhahab.; Abu al-Dhahab secures his position as shaykh-al-balad and governor of Egypt.	Muhammad Bey Abu al-Dhahab	?
Daher's counter-offensive	Beylik of Egypt: Mamluk mercenaries of Egypt.; Ottoman Empire: Ottoman Navy; Damascus Eyalet; Land armies	Emirate of Palestine: Umar's loyalists; Zaydani allies.; Maghrebi allies.	Victory: Death of Daher al-Umar.; Complete dissolution of Daher's Emirate.; Palestine restored to Ottoman suzerainty.	Vacant	?
Succession conflicts (1775–78)	Combatants separated by lines: 1775–78: Ismail Bey: Ismail's loyalists.; Alawiyya Mamluks; Ismailiyya Mamluks; Ibrahim Bey: Ibrahim's loyalists.; Muhammadiyya Mamluks; Murad Bey: Murad's loyalists.; Muhammadiyya Mamluks; Minor conflict between Ibrahim and Murad Bey: Ibrahim Bey: Ibrahim's loyalists.; Muhammadiyya Mamluks; Murad Bey: Murad's loyalists.; Muhammadiyya Mamluks		1775–78 conflict: Ibrahim-Murad Bey Victory: Ismail Bey becomes shaykh-al-balad and ousts Ibrahim Bey and Murad Bey.; Ibrahim Bey and Murad Bey later oust Ismail Bey with support of defectors.; Ibrahim-Murad conflict Peace: Ibrahim Bey and Murad Bey resolve their issues and install their dyarchy.	Disputed: Ismail Bey Ibrahim Bey and Murad Bey	?
Ottoman Reconquest of Egypt (1786)	Beylik of Egypt (surrendered): Ibrahim Bey (surrendered); Ibrahim's loyalists.; Murad Bey (surrendered); Murad's loyalists.; Muhammadiyya Mamluks	Ottoman Empire: Ottoman Sultanate; Ottoman Navy; Egypt Eyalet; Mamluk allies: Ismail Bey; Ismail's loyalists.; Alawiyya Mamluks; Ismailiyya Mamluks	Defeat: Dissolution of the Beylik of Egypt.; Egypt restored to Ottoman suzerainty.; Ismail Bey reinstated as shaykh-al-balad.; Ismail Pasha installed as the Ottoman governor of Egypt.	Ibrahim Bey and Murad Bey	?

== Ottoman Egypt (1786–1805) ==
Conflict	Combatant 1	Combatant 2	Results	Head of State	Egyptian losses
French invasion of Egypt and Syria	Ottoman Empire: Egypt; Mamluks; Regency of Algiers; Great Britain (1798–1800); United Kingdom (1801); Irregular and auxiliary forces: Nablus tribesmen; Bedouin tribesmen (1798–1799, 1801); Albanian bashi-bazouks	French Republic; Coptic Legion	Victory	Ibrahim bey	50,000 killed and wounded
Muhammad Ali's rise to power	Mameluks Great Britain Ottoman Empire	Muhammad Ali forces	Muhammad Ali victory: Muhammad Ali Pasha becomes ruler of Egypt; Egypt Eyalet established; End of Mamluk power in Egypt; Ottomans expelled from Egypt; Egypt Eyalet becomes an autonomous Ottoman Vassal and a de facto independent sovereign state	Muhammad Ali of Egypt	3,000 Turkish-Egyptian Mamluks

== Ottoman Eyalet of Egypt and Khedivate of Egypt (1803–1914) ==
Conflict	Combatant 1	Combatant 2	Results	Head of State	Egyptian losses
Fraser Expedition (1807)	Egypt Eyalet	(United Kingdom of Great Britain and Ireland) United Kingdom	Victory: Mohammed Ali seizes power in Egypt	Muhammad Ali of Egypt	?
Bedouin attack on Bilbeis	Egypt Eyalet	Bedouins	Inconclusive: the Bedouin could not continue on attacking other cities	Muhammad Ali of Egypt	200 Fellahin
Expulsion of the Hawwara	Egypt Eyalet	Hawwara Confederation	Victory: Ibrahim Pasha crushed their dominant influence, and made them flee in masses to the Sudan.	Muhammad Ali of Egypt	?
Egyptian–Saudi War (1811–1818)	Ottoman Empire; Eyalet of Egypt	Emirate of Diriyah	Victory: Execution of Abdullah bin Saud.	Muhammad Ali of Egypt	8,000 casualties
Conquest of eastern Libya	Egypt Eyalet	Ottoman Tripolitania	Victory: Egypt expands to siwa and jilf and expands influence through western desert	Muhammad Ali of Egypt	?
Egyptian conquest of Sudan (1820–1824)	Egypt	Sennar Sultanate; Shayqih Kingdom; Sultanate of Darfur	Victory: Invasion of Egypt into Sudan adding it to Egypt Eyalet.	Muhammad Ali of Egypt	?
Shendi and Sennar rebellion	Egypt Eyalet	Sennar rebels	Revolt suppressed: Ismai'l Kamil Pasha, son of Muhammad Ali Pasha, is burned to death by the Arab Ja'aliyin tribe, along with the destruction of his camp.; Mek Nimr escapes	Muhammad Ali of Egypt	?
Ahmad Revolt	Egypt Eyalet	Followers of Ahmad	Defeat for the forces of Ahmad: Revolt suppressed	Muhammad Ali of Egypt	?
Greek War of Independence (1821–1829)	Ottoman Empire Supported by: Egypt; Regency of Algiers; Tripolitania; Tunis; Danubian Sich	Greek Revolutionaries In detail: Klephts; Armatoloi; Filiki Eteria (Note: Only in 1821); Sacred Band; Messenian Senate; Peloponnesian Senate (Note: From 1821–1823.); Senate of Western Continental Greece; Areopagus of Eastern Continental Greece; Temporary regime of Crete; Military-Political System of Samos; After 1822: First Hellenic Republic; Military support: (First Hellenic Republic) Philhellenes; Carbonari revolutionaries; Serbian revolutionaries; Romanian revolutionaries (Note: From 1821.); Russian Empire (Note: From 1826.); Kingdom of France; United Kingdom; Diplomatic support: Haiti (Note: Haiti was the first nation to recognize the independence of Greece.); United States	Defeat Independence of Greece: The Peloponnese, Saronic Islands, Cyclades, Sporades and Continental Greece ceded to the independent Greek state; Crete ceded to Egypt	Muhammad Ali of Egypt	over 8,000
First Egyptian–Ottoman War (1831–1833)	Egypt; Supported by: Shihab dynasty Soran Emirate	Ottoman Empire Russian Empire (1833)	Victory: Convention of Kütahya; Egypt becomes an autonomous vassal of the Ottoman Empire and a de facto independent state; Unresolved tensions result in a second war six years later; Ottoman cession of Syria to Egypt	Muhammad Ali of Egypt	3,392–3,792
Syrian peasant revolt (1834–1835)	Egypt Eyalet	Alawite clans Urban notables of: Nablus; Jerusalem; Hebron; Safed	Victory: revolt suppressed	Muhammad Ali of Egypt	?
Peasants' revolt in Palestine	Egypt Eyalet Abd al-Hadi clan of Arraba; Abu Ghosh clan of Jerusalem region (From July 1834); Supported by: Shihab dynasty	Urban notables of Nablus, Jerusalem, Hebron and Safed In detail: Rural clans and Bedouin tribes of Palestine; Qasim, Jarrar, Barqawi, al-Hajj Muhammad and Jayyusi families of Jabal Nablus; Simhan family of Ras Karkar; Barghouti family of Bani Zeid; Abu Ghosh clan of Jerusalem region (Until July 1834); Madi family of Acre region; 'Amr tribe of Hebron Hills; Hawwara tribe of Galilee; Ta'amirah and Fawaghrah tribes of Bethlehem region; Awawna and Jabarat tribes of Gaza region; Supported by: Majali family of al-Karak	Victory: Rebel leaders executed; Egyptian rule reasserted; Conscription orders carried out; 10,000 peasants deported to Egypt	Muhammad Ali of Egypt	Several thousand
Alawite revolt (1834–1835)	Egypt Eyalet; Supported by: Emir Bashir's Christian forces	Alawite clans	Victory: revolt suppressed; Egyptian rule restored	Muhammad Ali of Egypt	?
1834 looting of Safed	Egypt Eyalet	Jews	Victory: revolt suppressed	Muhammad Ali of Egypt	?
Ottoman-Ethiopian border conflicts (1832–1848)	Ottoman Empire: Eyalet of Egypt	Ethiopia	Egyptian military Victory: Egypt occupies Metemma, Kassala and Teseney; Ethiopia fails to reoccupy Eastern Sudan; Ottoman-Egyptians expand south into the Great Lakes region	Muhammad Ali of Egypt	?
Battle of Debre Tabor	Loyalists to Ali; Eyalet of Egypt	Ethiopia: Loyalists to wube Haile Maryam	Victory: revolt suppressed	Muhammad Ali of Egypt	?
Expedition to Najd (1836) (1836)	Ottoman Empire: Egypt Eyalet	Emirate of Najd	Victory: Mehmet Ali occupies Najd, al-Hasa and Qatif and gains the submission of Bahrain, Qatar and Trucial Oman	Muhammad Ali of Egypt	?
1838 Druze revolt (1838)	Egypt Eyalet Shihab's forces supported by: Anaza tribe; Wuld Ali tribe; Sulut tribe of Laja (since March 1838)	Druze clans supported by: Sulut tribe of Laja (until March 1838); Maydan quarter of Damascus	Victory: Revolt suppressed; Peace agreement signed; Egyptian rule restored; Druze exempted from conscriptions	Muhammad Ali of Egypt	~400
Second Egyptian–Ottoman War (1839–1841)	(Ottoman Egypt) Egypt	(Ottoman Empire) Ottoman Empire; Allies: (United Kingdom of Great Britain and Ireland) United Kingdom (Austrian Empire) Austria (Russian Empire) Russia (Kingdom of Prussia) Prussia	Defeat: Egyptian retrocession of Syria, Crete, and the Hejaz to the Ottoman Empire	Muhammad Ali of Egypt	1,100+
Crimean War (1853–1856)	Ottoman Empire; France (Note: From 1854); United Kingdom (Kingdom of Sardinia) Sardinia (Note: From 1855)	Russia Greece (Note: Until 1854)	Victory: Russia loses the Danube Delta and Southern Bessarabia	Abbas I of Egypt	?
British expedition to Abyssinia	Egypt United Kingdom: India Ethiopian rebels	Ethiopia	Victory: Release of European hostages; Suicide of Emperor Tewodros II; Destruction of Magdala fortress	Isma'il Pasha	?
Cretan revolt (1866–1869)	Ottoman Empire; Egypt	Greek Revolutionaries; Supported by: Kingdom of Greece	Victory: Suppression of the revolt	Isma'il Pasha	1,333
Conquest of Darfur (1873–1874)	Egyptian Empire	Sultanate of Darfur	Victory: fall of the darfur Sultanate; Darfur becomes a province of Sudan; the dynasty re-established the sultanate in al-Fashir under Ali Dinar in 1898	Isma'il Pasha	?
Egyptian invasion of Bogos	Egyptian Empire	Ethiopia	Victory: Bogos lands were annexed to Egypt; Werner Munzinger purchased the province of Eilat.	Isma'il Pasha	?
Ethiopian invasion of Eastern Sudan	Egyptian Empire	Ethiopia	Victory: Besides the Ethiopians looting the area, the Egyptian forces have forced them to surrender	Isma'il Pasha	?
Ethiopian–Egyptian War (1874–1876)	Egyptian Empire	Ethiopia	Status quo ante bellum: both sides did not achieve their goals; A huge economical loss for Egypt	Isma'il Pasha	13,000+
Invasion of Juba	Egyptian Empire	Shilluk Kingdom	Victory: Egypt takes control of South Sudan	Isma'il Pasha	?
Expansion through Lake Victoria	Egyptian Empire	Kingdom of Bunyoro; Turkana people kingdom of buganda	Victory: Egypt controls bunyoro; Egypt expands its influence through Lake Victoria; Establishment of Hatt-ı Üstuva vilayet	Isma'il Pasha	?
Invasion of the Equatoria	Egyptian Empire	Dinka tribe Nuer people Azande chiefdoms Bande tribe Mangbetu tribe Sultanate of Bagirmi; Murle people other Bantu tribes	Victory: Egypt controls parts of Congo and Central Africa; Establishment of the Egyptian Equatoria	Isma'il Pasha	?
Egyptian invasion of the Eastern Horn of Africa (1874–1885)	Khedivate of Egypt	Oromo; Emirate of Harar; Sultanate of Aussa Afran Qallo	Victory: Occupation of Hararghe and northern Somali coast; Establishment of the Khedivate's Somali Coast; Egyptian forces retreat to Zeila and Mount Hakim; Egyptian-controlled Harari Emirate disestablished in 1885; Annexation of Emirate of Harar and northern Somali coast	Isma'il Pasha	?
Serbian–Turkish Wars (1876–1878)	Ottoman Empire; (Khedivate of Egypt) Egypt; Albanian volunteers	Serbia; Montenegro; Russia; Bulgarian Volunteers	Defeat: De jure independence of Serbia from the Ottoman Empire	Isma'il Pasha	?
‘Urabi Revolt (1879–1882)	Khedivate of Egypt (Khedivalist forces); United Kingdom: India	ʻUrabilist forces	Defeat of ‘Urabi: Revolt suppressed; ʻUrabi exiled; British intervention in Egypt	Isma'il Pasha	?
Mahdist War (1881–1899)	United Kingdom • Egypt • India • Canada • Colony of New South Wales; Italy • (Kingdom of Italy) Colony of Eritrea; Ethiopia; Congo Free State	Mahdist State	Victory: Sudanese invasions of neighbours repelled; Britain and Egypt took over Sudan and turned it into a condominium known as the Anglo-Egyptian Sudan; Kassala temporarily occupied by Italy; Congo secures the Lado Enclave until 1910	Tewfik of Egypt	?

== Sultanate of Egypt (British Protectorate) (1914–1922) ==
Conflict	Combatant 1	Combatant 2	Results	Head of State	Egyptian losses
World War I (1914–1918)	Allied Powers: France; United Kingdom; and Empire: Australia; Canada; Ceylon; Egypt; Newfoundland; New Zealand; India; South Africa; Russia (Note: The Russian Empire during 1914–1917, the Russian Republic during 1917. The Bolshevik government signed a separate peace with the Central Powers shortly after their armed seizure of power, resulting in a Central Powers victory on the Eastern Front of the war, and the Russian Soviet Federative Socialist Republic's defeat. However, this peace treaty was nullified by an Allied Powers victory on the Western Front, and the end of the war.); Italy (from 1915); United States (from 1917); Japan; and others ...	Central Powers: Germany; Austria-Hungary; Ottoman Empire; Bulgaria (from 1915); and others ...	Victory: Partition of the Ottoman Empire, dissolution of Austria-Hungary, transfer of German colonies and territories to other countries; Formation of new countries in Europe and the Middle East, such as Poland, Yugoslavia, Weimar Germany, Soviet Russia and Soviet Union, Lithuania, Estonia, Latvia, Austria, Hungary, Czechoslovakia, Turkey, Hejaz, and Yemen	Hussein Kamel	14,763+
Anglo-Egyptian Darfur Expedition (1916)	British Empire; Sultanate of Egypt	Sultanate of Darfur; Supported by: Ottoman Empire; Senussi	Victory: Darfur becomes a province of Sudan	Hussein Kamel	5
Egyptian Revolution (1918–1919)	Britain: Sultanate of Egypt; Anglo-Egyptian Sudan; Australia; New Zealand	Egyptian protesters: Wafd Party	Wafd Victory: Unilateral Declaration of Egyptian Independence; Implementation of the 1923 Constitution of Egypt; Establishment of the Kingdom of Egypt	Fuad I	800

== Kingdom of Egypt (1919–1953) ==
Conflict	Combatant 1	Combatant 2	Results	Head of State	Egyptian losses
World War II (1939–1945)	Allies; Soviet Union; United States; United Kingdom; China; France; Poland; Yugoslavia; Greece; Netherlands; Belgium; Luxembourg; Denmark; Norway; Czechoslovakia; Canada; Australia; Kingdom of Egypt; New Zealand; India; South Africa; Philippines (Ethiopian Empire) Ethiopia; Brazil; Mexico (Mongolian People's Republic) Mongolia	Axis; Germany; Japan; Italy; Hungary; Romania; Bulgaria; Slovakia; Croatia; Finland; Iraq; Thailand	Victory: Collapse of the German Reich and the Empire of Japan; Creation of the United Nations; Emergence of the United States and the Soviet Union as superpowers; Beginning of the Cold War	Farouk I	1,125
1935–1936 protests in Egypt	Kingdom of Egypt; United Kingdom	Protestors	Protestors Defeat	Farouk I	100
Abdeen Palace incident (1942)	Kingdom of Egypt	United Kingdom	Defeat: King Farouk capitulates	Farouk I	None
First Arab–Israeli War (1948–1949)	Arab League: Egypt; All-Palestine Protectorate (Note: After 22 September 1948); Holy War Army; Transjordan; Syria; Lebanon (Note: Lebanon had decided to not participate in the war and only took part in the battle of al-Malikiya on 5–6 June 1948.); Saudi Arabia; Yemen Irregulars: Arab Liberation Army; Al-Najjada; Holy War Army	Israel Before 26 May 1948: (Israel) Yishuv; Paramilitary groups: Haganah; Palmach; Hish; Him; Irgun; Lehi; Allied Bedouin tribes After 26 May 1948: Israel Defense Forces; Minorities Unit; Foreign volunteers: Mahal	Defeat: Establishment of the State of Israel, Jordanian annexation of the West Bank, Egyptian occupation of the Gaza Strip; 1948 Palestinian expulsion and flight; Beginning of the Palestinian Fedayeen insurgency	Farouk I	1,161- 2,000
Battle of Ismailia (1952)	Egypt	United Kingdom	Defeat: Cairo fire; Attacks on British soldiers by Egyptian guerrillas in the Suez Canal Zone increase and get more violent; Egyptian Revolution of 1952	Farouk I	56 killed 73 wounded
Cairo Fire (1952)	Egypt	European Civilians	Victory	Farouk I	Unknown
Egyptian Revolution (1952)	Kingdom of Egypt; Supported by: United Kingdom; France	(Egypt) Free Officers Movement; Supported by: United States	Free Officers' Victory: End of rule of the Muhammad Ali dynasty; The Kingdom of Egypt becomes the Republic of Egypt; End of British influence in Egypt; Dictatorship imposed until the 2011 revolution; Independence of Sudan in 1956; Beginning of the Nasser era; Revolutionary wave across the Arab world	Farouk I	2

== Republic of Egypt (1953–1958) ==
Conflict	Egypt and allies	Opponents	Results	Head of State	Minister of Defense	Egyptian losses	
Conflict	Egypt and allies	Opponents	Results	Head of State	Minister of Defense	Military	Civilians
Jebel Akhdar War (1954–1959)	Imamate of Oman; Supported by: Republic of Egypt; Saudi Arabia	Sultanate of Muscat; United Kingdom	Defeat (Limited involvement): Dissolution of the Imamate of Oman	Gamal Abdel Nasser	Abdel Hakim Amer	None	None
Algerian War (1954–1962)	Algeria; Republic of Egypt	France	Victory: Independence of Algeria from France	Gamal Abdel Nasser	Abdel Hakim Amer	Unknown	None
Suez Crisis (1956)	Egypt	Israel; United Kingdom; France	Inconclusive: Egyptian political victory; Coalition military victory	Gamal Abdel Nasser	Abdel Hakim Amer	1,650– 3,000	~1,000
Syrian Crisis of 1957	Second Syrian Republic; Soviet Union; Republic of Egypt	Turkey; United States; Baghdad Pact	Victory: Egypt successfully opposed Turkey's plans to invade Syria, backed by U.S. support.	Gamal Abdel Nasser	Abdel Hakim Amer	Unknown	None

== United Arab Republic (1958–1971) ==
Conflict	Egypt and allies	Opponents	Results	Head of State	Minister of Defense	Egyptian losses	
Conflict	Egypt and allies	Opponents	Results	Head of State	Minister of Defense	Military	Civilians
Lebanon crisis (1958)	Najjadeh Party; Progressive Socialist Party; Lebanese Communist Party; Al-Mourabitoun; Supported by: United Arab Republic	Lebanese Armed Forces; Kataeb Party; Syrian Social Nationalist Party; ARF; Supported by: United States	Inconclusive: Reconciliation Government formed	Gamal Abdel Nasser	Abdel Hakim Amer	None	None
Mosul uprising 1959	Arab nationalists: Ba'ath Party; (Arab Revolt) Sympathetic Arab tribes; Supported by: United Arab Republic; United States: CIA (alleged)	(Iraq) Iraqi Government; Communist Party; Kurdistan Democratic Party; Arab, Kurdish, and Assyrian peasants	Defeat (Limited involvement)	Gamal Abdel Nasser	Abdel Hakim Amer	None	None
Syrian coup d'état (1961)	United Arab Republic	Syrian Arab Republic: Supreme Arab Revolutionary Command of the Armed Forces; National Party; People's Party; Muslim Brotherhood; Communist Party; Ba'ath Party; Arab Liberation Movement	Coup successful: Syrian independence restored; Repeal of socialist UAR's laws, reversal of nationalization of several industries and currency unification; Writing of a new constitution, Constitution of 1950 in force; Series of coups and counter-coups culminate in the coup of 8 March 1963	Gamal Abdel Nasser	Abdel Hakim Amer	None	None
North Yemen Civil War (1962–1967)	Yemen Arab Republic; United Arab Republic	Kingdom of Yemen; Saudi Arabia	Republican Victory: Khartoum Resolution, Egyptian withdrawal; Eventual Republican victory in 1970.	Gamal Abdel Nasser	Abdel Wahab el-Beshry	26,000 dead	None
Sand War (1963)	Algeria; United Arab Republic	Morocco	Stalemate: The closing of the border south of Figuig	Gamal Abdel Nasser	Abdel Wahab el-Beshry	Unknown	None
Aden Emergency (1963–1967)	NLF; FLOSY; Supported by: United Arab Republic	United Kingdom; Federation of South Arabia; Protectorate of South Arabia	Victory: British withdrawal from South Yemen	Gamal Abdel Nasser	Abdel Wahab el-Beshry	300 Dead	Minimal to none
Ethiopian–Somali Border War	(Somalia) Somalia; Supported by: (United Arab Republic) Egypt	(Ethiopian Empire) Ethiopia; Supported by: United States	Stalemate	Gamal Abdel Nasser	Abdel Wahab el-Beshry	Minimal to none	Minimal to none
Six-Day War (1967)	Egypt; Syria; Jordan; Iraq; Minor involvement: Lebanon	Israel	Defeat: Israel occupies a total of 70,000 km^{2} (27,000 sq mi) of territory: The Golan Heights from Syria; The West Bank including East Jerusalem from Jordan; The Gaza Strip and the Sinai Peninsula from Egypt	Gamal Abdel Nasser	Shams Badran	9,800–15,000 killed or missing	Unknown
War of Attrition (1967–1970)	Egypt; Soviet Union; Kuwait; PLO; Jordan; Syria; Cuba	Israel	Inconclusive	Mohamed Fawzi	2,882–10,000		
Nigerian Civil War (1967–1970)	Nigeria; United Arab Republic	Biafra	Victory: Reincorporation of Biafra into Nigeria.	Mohamed Fawzi	Unknown	None	

== Arab Republic of Egypt (1971–present) ==
Conflict	Egypt and allies	Opponents	Results	Head of State	Minister of Defense	Egyptian losses	
Conflict	Egypt and allies	Opponents	Results	Head of State	Minister of Defense	Military	Civilians
Yom Kippur War (1973)	Egypt; Syria; Expeditionary forces Saudi Arabia Algeria Jordan Libya Iraq Kuwait Tunisia Morocco Cuba North Korea	Israel	Inconclusive Analyses differ on the militarily outcome of the war; as an Israeli victory by some military historians, and by others, as a military stalemate.: At the final ceasefire: Egyptian forces held 1,200 km^{2} (460 sq mi) on the eastern bank of the canal.; Israeli forces held 1,600 km^{2} (620 sq mi) on the western bank of the canal.; Israeli forces held 500 km^{2} (193 sq mi) of the Syrian Bashan region of the Golan Heights.	Anwar Sadat	Ahmad Ismail Ali	5,000–15,000 dead	Unknown
Shaba I (1977)	Zaire; Morocco; Egypt	FNLC	Victory: FNCL expelled from Katanga	Anwar Sadat	Mohamed el-Gamasy	None	None
Egyptian–Libyan War (1977)	Egypt	Libya	Victory: Libyan Armed Forces expelled from Egypt; Egyptian armed forces success; Anwar El Sadat declaration of a ceasefire	Anwar Sadat	Mohamed el-Gamasy	~100	Unknown
Chadian–Libyan War (1978–1987)	Anti-Libyan Chadian factions: FAT (1978–1979); FAN (1978–1983); FANT (1983–1987); GUNT (1986–1987) France Zaire Nigeria Senegal NFSL; Supported by: DR Sudan; Sudan; Egypt; Israel; Iraq; Algeria; United States	Libya; Pro-Libyan Chadian factions: FROLINAT; GUNT (1979–1986); Codos (1983–1986); FAP (1978–1986) PLO (1987) Abu Nidal Organization; Supported by: Algeria; East Germany; Soviet Union	Victory: Chad regains control of the Aouzou Strip.	Anwar Sadat	Abd Al-Halim Abu-Ghazala	1,000 Dead	Unknown
Egyptian conscripts riot (1986)	Egyptian Army	Central Security Forces	Egyptian Army Victory: Riot suppressed; Mubarak regime promised to overhaul the force by raising its entry standards, increasing payment and bettering living conditions in their camps	Hosni Mubarak	Abd Al-Halim Abu-Ghazala	107	None
Gulf War (1990–1991)	Kuwait; United States; United Kingdom; Saudi Arabia; France; Canada; Egypt; Syria; Morocco; Oman; Qatar; Australia	Iraq	Victory: Iraqi withdrawal from Kuwait; Emir Jaber Al-Ahmad Al-Jaber Al-Sabah restored; Heavy casualties and destruction of Iraqi and Kuwaiti infrastructure	Hosni Mubarak	Youssef Sabri Abu Taleb	11	None
Algerian Civil War (1992–2002)	Government of Algeria; Minor involvement: Egypt; Tunisia; France; European Union; South Africa	Islamic Salvation Front loyalists Morocco; Libya (until 1995); Saudi Arabia (pre-war); Iran (alleged); Saudi private donors Armed Islamic Group (from 1993); Minor involvement: Sudan (alleged); Iran (alleged); Egyptian Islamic Jihad (until 1995) Salafist Group for Preaching and Combat (from 1998); Minor involvement: Al-Qaeda	Algerian Government Victory	Hosni Mubarak	Mohamed Tantawi	None	None
War on terror (2001–present)	United States United Kingdom France Russia; NATO members: Albania; Belgium; Bulgaria; Canada; Croatia; Czech Republic; Denmark; Estonia; Germany; Greece; Hungary; Iceland; Italy; Latvia; Lithuania; Luxembourg; Montenegro; Netherlands; North Macedonia; Norway; Poland; Portugal; Romania; Slovakia; Slovenia; Spain; Turkey; Other participant countries: Algeria; Angola; Armenia; Australia; Austria; Azerbaijan; Bahrain; Bangladesh; Belarus; Benin; Bosnia and Herzegovina; Botswana; Brunei; Burkina Faso; Burundi; Cambodia; Cameroon; Cape Verde; Chad; China; Colombia; Comoros; Costa Rica; Cuba; Democratic Republic of the Congo; Djibouti; Dominican Republic; Cyprus; Egypt; El Salvador; Eritrea; Ethiopia; Finland; Gabon; Georgia; Ghana; Guinea; Guinea-Bissau; Honduras; India; Indonesia; Iran; Iraq; Ireland; Islamic Republic of Afghanistan (2004–2021); Israel; Ivory Coast; Japan; Jordan; Kazakhstan; Kenya; Kuwait; Kyrgyzstan; Lebanon; Liberia; Libya; Malawi; Malaysia; Mali; Malta; Mauritania; Mongolia; Morocco; Mozambique; Namibia; Nepal; New Zealand; Nicaragua; Niger; Nigeria; North Korea; Oman; Pakistan; Palestine; Philippines; Rwanda; Saudi Arabia; Senegal; Serbia; Seychelles; Sierra Leone; Singapore; Somalia; South Africa; South Korea; Sudan; Sweden; Switzerland; Tajikistan; Taiwan; Tanzania; Thailand; The Gambia; Togo; Tonga; Tunisia; Turkmenistan; Uganda; Ukraine; United Arab Emirates; Uzbekistan; Vietnam; Yemen; Zimbabwe; International missions: NATO—ISAF; Resolute Support Mission; Operation Enduring Freedom Allies; Northern Alliance; Multi-National Force – Iraq; Combined Joint Task Force – Horn of Africa; Combined Joint Task Force – Operation Inherent Resolve; (note: most contributing nations are included in the international operations)	ISIL: Sinai Province; Libya Province; Algeria Province; Central Africa Province; West Africa Province; Die Wahre Religion; Katibah Nusantara; Islamic State in the Greater Sahara; Khorasan Province; Yemen Province; Boko Haram; Ansar Khalifa Philippines; Caucasus Province; ISS; Abu Sayyaf; Al-Khansaa Brigade; Sheikh Omar Hadid Brigade; Free Sunnis of Baalbek Brigade; National Thowheeth Jama'ath; Profetens Ummah; Islamic Muthanna Movement; MIT; Afghan Taliban (until 2021); Pakistani Taliban Other groups: East Turkestan Islamic Movement; Osbat al-Ansar; Haqqani network; TNSM; Bangsamoro Islamic Freedom Fighters; Lashkar-e-Taiba; Lashkar-e-Omar; Lashkar-e-Jhangvi; Hizbul Mujahideen; Iraqi Insurgents; Ansaru; Mullah Dadullah Front; Fidai Mahaz; Shura Council of Benghazi Revolutionaries; Ansar al-Sharia (Tunisia); Hamas; Hezbollah; Islamic Jihad Union; Masked Brigade; Jaish-e-Mohammed; Ahrar ash-Sham; Fatah al-Islam; Jamaah Ansharut Tauhid; Jaish al-Islam; Indian Mujahideen; Harkat-ul-Mujahideen; Great Eastern Islamic Raiders' Front; Moroccan Islamic Combatant Group; Soldiers of Egypt; Mujahideen Pattani Movement; Harkat-ul-Jihad al-Islami; Rajah Sulaiman movement; Somali pirates; Salafia Jihadia; Ansar al-Sharia (Mali); Ansar al-Sharia (Mauritania); Ansar al-Sharia (Morocco); Ansar al-Sharia (Egypt); Ansar al-Sharia (Yarmouk Area); Jemaah Islamiyah; Ansar al-Sunna (Mozambique); Former groups: Islamic Courts Union (until 2006); JTJ (until 2004); Free Aceh Movement (until 2005); al-Qaeda in Iraq (until 2006); Salafist Group for Preaching and Combat (until 2007); Tunisian Combatant Group (until 2011); Islamic State of Iraq (until 2013); MOJWA (until 2013); Ansar al-Islam (until 2014); Jundallah; Tehreek-e-Khilafat (until November 2014); Hizbul Islam (until 2014); Jamaat-ul-Ahrar (until March 2015); Jamaat-ul-Ahrar (until 2015); Ansar al-Sharia (Syria) (until 2016); Hezb-e-Islami Gulbuddin (until 2016); Caucasus Emirate (until 2016); Al-Nusra Front (until 2017); Harakat Sham al-Islam (until 2017); Jund al-Aqsa (until 2017); Ansar Dine (until March 2017); Al-Mourabitoun (until March 2017); Ansar al-Sharia (Libya) (until May 2017); Maute Group (until 2017); Islamic Emirate of Waziristan (until 2017/2018); Ansar al-Sharia (Derna, Libya) (until 2018); Turaifie group (until 2019); Khalid ibn al-Walid Army (until 2018); Jund al-Khilafah (2014); Dokumacılar (until 2017); Yarmouk Martyrs Brigade (until 2016); Jaysh al-Jihad (until 2016); IMU (until 2015); Rajah Sulaiman Movement (until ?); Islamic Jihad of Yemen (until ?); Black Banner Organization (until ?); Iraqi Baath Party loyalists (until ?)	Ongoing: Ongoing conflict	Hosni Mubarak	Mohamed Tantawi	?	?
Syrian civil war spillover in Lebanon (2011– 2017)	Lebanon: Lebanese Armed Forces; Internal Security Forces; Hezbollah; Lebanese Resistance Brigades; Support: Australia; Canada; China; Cyprus; Czech Republic; Egypt; France; Germany; Iran; Italy; Jordan; Syria; Netherlands; Russia; Saudi Arabia; South Korea; Spain; Turkey; United Kingdom; United States; Pro-Assad militant groups: PFLP-GC; Amal Movement; Syrian Social Nationalist Party; DFLP; Popular Nasserist Organization; As-Sa'iqa; Fatah al-Intifada; Arab Democratic Party (until 2014); Armenian Revolutionary Federation; Arab Movement Party; Support: Syria; Iran; Russia; Other militias: Lebanese Communist Party; Fatah	Syrian militant forces: Free Syrian Army; Saraya Ahl al-Sham (surrendered); Islamic Front (until 2015); Jaysh al-Islam; Hay'at Tahrir al-Sham (from 2017) (surrendered); Future Movement Support: Saudi Arabia; Al-Qaeda and allies: Al-Nusra Front (until 2017)^{[a]}; Fatah al-Islam; Ghuraba al-Sham (until 2013); Jund al-Sham; Abdullah Azzam Brigades; Osbat al-Ansar; Sunni Resistance Committees; Muslim Youth; Islamic State (surrendered) (from 2013): Military of ISIL; Free Sunnis of Baalbek Brigade	Lebanese victory: The Lebanese Army and Hezbollah expelled IS militants as well as fighters of Al-Qaeda and its allies from Lebanon entirely in 2017 and reestablished control across all Lebanese territory.	Hosni Mubarak	Mohamed Tantawi	?	?
2011 Egyptian revolution (2011)	(Egypt) Pro-Government: National Democratic Party; Central Security Forces; Egyptian Armed Forces (initially); Police forces; State Security Intelligence; Supreme Council of the Armed Forces	(Egypt) Opposition Groups: 6 April Youth Movement; Muslim Brotherhood; Kefaya; Egyptian Armed Forces (switched sides)	Opposition Victory: Toppling of the Mubarak government; Resignation of Prime Ministers Nazif and Shafik; Assumption of power by the military; Suspension of the Constitution and dissolution of the Parliament; Disbanding of the State Security Investigations Service; Dissolution of the NDP (former ruling party) and transfer of its assets to the state; Arrest and prosecution of Mubarak, his family and former ministers; 31-year state of emergency lifted; Democratic election to replace Mubarak; Mohamed Morsi elected as new president; Protests in response to Morsi's temporary constitutional declaration.	Hosni Mubarak	Mohamed Tantawi	* During revolution: 846: Post-Revolution: 300+	
First Libyan civil war (2011)	(Libya) Anti-Gaddafi forces Qatar NATO: Belgium; Bulgaria; Canada; Denmark; France; Greece; Italy; Netherlands; Norway; Poland (only humanitarian and medical aid); Romania; Spain; Turkey; United Kingdom; United States; Other countries: Jordan; Sweden; United Arab Emirates; Minor border clashes: Tunisia: Tunisian Army; Tunisian Police; Supported by: Egypt	Libyan Arab Jamahiriya	Libyan opposition/NATO victory: Complete overthrow and collapse of the Gaddafi regime.; Killing of Muammar Gaddafi and end of his rule over Libya on 20 October 2011; Start and continuation of the Libyan Crisis; Assumption of interim control by National Transitional Council (NTC); remained in power until August 8, 2012; UN authorisation of NATO led military intervention; Diplomatic recognition of NTC as sole governing authority for Libya by 105 countries, UN, EU, AL and AU; Factional violence in the aftermath of the war leading to another civil war between 2014 and 2020.	Supreme Council of the Armed Forces	Mohamed Tantawi	?	?
Sinai Insurgency (2011–2023)	Egypt; Israel; United Arab Emirates	Islamic State	Victory: Egypt ended presence of ISIS in Sinai	Supreme Council of the Armed Forces	Mohamed Tantawi	3,277 killed (2013–2022); 12,280 Injured (2013–2022)	1,539+ Egyptian, 219 Russians, 4 Ukrainians, 1 Belarusian, 3 South Koreans, 3 Vietnamese, 2 Germans, 1 Croatian
2013 Egyptian coup d'état (2013)	Egyptian Government Muslim Brotherhood: Freedom and Justice Party; Islamists; Egyptian Islamic Labour Party; (Egypt) Pro-Morsi protesters Supported by: Turkey; Qatar; Jordan	Supreme Council of the Armed Forces: Egyptian Armed Forces; Egyptian Police; (Egypt) (United Arab Republic) Nasserists; National Democratic Party; Al-Azhar University; Al-Nour Party	Supreme Council of the Armed Forces Victory President Mohamed Morsi deposed by the Egyptian army: Constitution suspended, and a transitional roadmap declared; Adly Mansour becomes interim president; Arrests and detention of Muslim Brotherhood leaders and members, including Morsi; Closure of perceived pro-Muslim Brotherhood media outlets; Dissolution of Shura Council; Escalation of militant attacks in the Sinai Peninsula; Increasing unrest and instability in response to coup; Temporary suspension of Egypt from the African Union; New presidential election held in 2014; Morsi and other Muslim Brotherhood figures jailed on various charges; Crackdown on the Muslim Brotherhood; Mohamed Morsi dies during his court trial on 17 June 2019	Mohamed Morsi	Abdel Fattah al-Sisi	1,150+	
Aswan tribal clashes (2014)	Arab Al-Halayel clan	Nubian Al-Dabodeya clan	Inconclusive: The army intervened to contain the crisis following a call by Aswan's governor; Sheikh Ahmed el-Tayeb went to Aswan in order to complete mediation between the two rivals.	Abdel Fattah el-Sisi	Sedki Sobhi	None	25 killed 50+ injured
Second Libyan Civil War (2015–2020)	Libya; Egypt; United Arab Emirates	(Libya) GNC Shura Council Islamic State	House of Representatives Victory (limited involvement): Egyptian military intervention	Abdel Fattah el-Sisi	Sedki Sobhi	None	21
Intervention In Yemen (2015–)	(Yemen) Hadi government Saudi Arabia; United Arab Emirates; Senegal; Sudan; Qatar; Bahrain; South Korea; Kuwait; Jordan; Morocco; Egypt; France	(Yemen) Revolutionary Council: Houthis; (Yemen) Saleh loyalists	Ongoing: Houthis dissolve Yemeni government.; Houthis take control of northern Yemen.	Abdel Fattah el-Sisi	Sedki Sobhi	None	None
2024 Egyptian Skirmish in Rafah (Note: A skirmish between Israeli and Egyptian soldiers occurred near the Rafah crossing, resulting in one Egyptian soldier being killed. Both countries accused each other of opening fire first. Reuters however cited Egyptian sources as stating that the Egyptian soldier shot at IDF soldiers who crossed into Egypt while pursuing and killing several Palestinians. The IDF troops fired back, resulting in his death and sparking a clash between two sides which left several IDF soldiers and one Egyptian soldier wounded. i24NEWS quoted IDF sources accusing Egyptian soldiers of firing at the Engineering Corps in Rafah first, resulting in several Egyptian soldiers being wounded while the IDF received no casualties. The New Arab meanwhile reported that seven IDF soldiers were wounded. An Egyptian soldier wounded in the clash later succumbed to his wounds, although the state-affiliated Al Qahera News cited a security source as denying it.)	Egypt	Israel (Palestine) Palestinian Joint Operations Room	Inconclusive	Abdel Fattah el-Sisi	Mohamed Ahmed Zaki	1	None

== Notes and references ==
=== Sources ===
- Егоршина, Петрова (2023). История русской армии [The history of the Russian Army] (in Russian). Moscow: Moskva. ISBN 978-5-699-42397-2.
- Airapetov, Oleg (2017). Крымская война [Crimean War] (in Russian). Regnum. ISBN 978-5-91150-036-8.
- Arnold, Guy (2002). Historical Dictionary of the Crimean War. Scarecrow Press. ISBN 978-0-81086613-3.
- Badem, Candan (2010). The Ottoman Crimean War (1853-1856). BRILL. doi:10.1163/ej.9789004182059.i-432. ISBN 978-90-04-18205-9. JSTOR 10.1163/j.ctt1w8h1kf. OCLC 1247557705, 668221743.
- Bard, Kathryn A. (2008). An Introduction to the Archaeology of Ancient Egypt. Malden, Massachusetts: Blackwell Publishing. ISBN 978-1-4051-1149-2.
- Breasted, J.H. (1906). Ancient Records of Egypt: Part One. Chicago.
- Budge, E. A. Wallis (1914). The Literature of the Ancient Egyptians. London: Dent.
- Clodfelter, M. (2017). Warfare and Armed Conflicts: A Statistical Encyclopedia of Casualty and Other Figures, 1492–2015 (4th ed.). Jefferson, North Carolina: McFarland. ISBN 978-0786474707.
- Dumas, S.; Vedel-Petersen, K.O. (1923). Losses of Life Caused By War. Oxford: Clarendon Press. pp. 41–42.
- Figes, Orlando (2010). Crimea: The Last Crusade. London: Allen Lane. ISBN 978-0-7139-9704-0.
- Figes, Orlando (2011). The Crimean War: A History. Henry Holt and Company. ISBN 978-1429997249.
- Greenwood, Adrian (2015). Victoria's Scottish Lion: The Life of Colin Campbell, Lord Clyde. UK: History Press. p. 496. ISBN 978-0-7509-5685-7. Archived from the original on 21 February 2016.
- Kissinger, H. (2012). Diplomacy. Simon & Schuster UK. ISBN 978-1-4711-0449-7.
- Madden, Thomas F. (2006). The New Concise History of the Crusades. Rowman & Littlefield. ISBN 978-0-7425-3823-8.
- Malek, Jaromir (2000). "The Old Kingdom (c. 2686-2160 BC)". In Shaw, Ian (ed.). Oxford History of Ancient Egypt. Oxford: Oxford University Press. ISBN 978-0-19-815034-3.
- McDowall, David (2005). A Modern History of the Kurds (3rd ed.). London: I.B. Tauris. ISBN 978-1-85043-416-0.
- Marriott, J.A.R. (1917). The Eastern Question. An Historical Study in European Diplomacy. Oxford at the Clarendon Press.
- Morris, Benny (2001). Righteous Victims: A History of the Zionist-Arab Conflict, 1881–2001. New York: Vintage Books. ISBN 978-0-679-42120-7.
- Morris, Benny (2008). 1948: The First Arab-Israeli War. New Haven: Yale University Press. ISBN 978-0-300-12696-9.
- O'Ballance, Edgar (1978). No Victor, No Vanquished: The Yom Kippur War. Presidio Press. ISBN 978-0-89141-017-1.
- Oren, Michael B. (2002). Six Days of War: June 1967 and the Making of the Modern Middle East. Oxford University Press. ISBN 978-0-19-515174-9.
- Panzac, Daniel (2005). Barbary Corsairs. Leiden: Brill. ISBN 978-90-04-12594-0.
- Porter, Maj Gen Whitworth (1889). History of the Corps of Royal Engineers. Vol. I. Chatham: The Institution of Royal Engineers.
- Rabinovich, Abraham (2004). The Yom Kippur War: The Epic Encounter That Transformed the Middle East. New York: Schocken Books. ISBN 978-0-8052-4176-1.
- Royle, Trevor (2000), Crimea: The Great Crimean War, 1854–1856, Palgrave Macmillan, ISBN 1-4039-6416-5
- Seale, Patrick (1992). Abu Nidal: a gun for hire. Random House. ISBN 0-679-40066-4.
- Shazly, Lieutenant General Saad el (2003). The Crossing of the Suez, Revised Edition (revised ed.). American Mideast Research. ISBN 978-0-9604562-2-2.
- Small, Hugh (2007), The Crimean War: Queen Victoria's War with the Russian Tsars, Tempus
- Snook, Mike (2010). Go Strong Into the Desert: the Mahdist Uprising in Sudan, 1881–85. Nottingham: Perry Miniatures. ISBN 978-0-9561842-1-4.
- Strathern, Paul (2008). "The Retreat from Acre". Napoleon in Egypt. Random House Publishing Group. ISBN 978-0-553-90588-5.
- Tarle, Evgenii Viktorovich (1950). Crimean War (in Russian). Vol. II. Moscow and Leningrad: Izdatel'stvo Akademii Nauk.
- Tarle, Yevgeny (1959). Writings (in Russian). Vol. 9. Moscow: USSR Academy of Sciences Press.
- Taylor, A. J. P. (1954). The Struggle for Mastery in Europe: 1848–1918. Oxford University Press.
- Troubetzkoy, Alexis S. (2006). A Brief History of the Crimean War. London: Constable & Robinson. ISBN 978-1-84529-420-5.
