= Abu Rakwa =

Abū Rakwa al-Walīd ibn Hishām ibn ʿAbd al-Malik al-Umawi (Arabic: أبو ركوة الوليد بن هشام بن عبد الملك الأموي) (died 20 March 1007) was an Umayyad prince and descendant who arrived in Barqa from al-Andalus in 1005 and waged war on the Fatimid Caliphate with the support of the Banu Qurra. After taking the city and defeating a Fatimid army, his forces invaded Egypt and nearly toppled the regime of Caliph al-Hakim after a battle in Giza against an army led by Ali ibn Ja'far ibn Fallah. He diverted his revolt to Fayyum and the Fatimids managed to get the Banu Qurra again on their side, thereby defeating the rebellion.

In 1006, Abu Rakwa fled to Nobadia, but the eparch refused to let him continue and he was captured by leader of the Rabi'a, Abu'l-Makarim Hibat Allah, who handed him over to the Fatimids. He was sent to Cairo, where he was executed. Abu'l-Makarim was rewarded with the title Kanz al-Dawla for his part in end of Abū Rakwa's revolt.
