= Rakım Mehmed Pasha =

Rakım Mehmed Pasha (transliterated from Arabic as Muhammad Raqim Pasha) (died 1769 or 1770) was an Ottoman official who served as imperial defterdar (chief treasurer), the governor of Egypt and the governor of Jedda.

== Life ==
Rakım Mehmed's father, Boz Oglan Ibrahim Effendi (d. c. 1746), was an imperial defterdar. Rakim Mehmed became a vizier and defterdar under Sultan Mustafa III (r. 1757–1774). He erected a fountain in honor of his father in the Çoban Mustafa Pasha Mosque in Gebze near the imperial capital Constantinople in 1768.

He was appointed governor of Egypt in February 1767 following the ouster of Governor Hamza Pasha by the warring mamluk beys who dominated the province. Rakim Mehmed Pasha was instructed by the imperial government to prop up the mamluk Ali Bey al-Kabir to balance the growing power of the ruling mamluks Husayn Bey and Khalil Bey. When Ali Bey marched on the provincial capital Cairo, Rakim Mehmed Pasha prevented the intervention of government forces, such as the janissaries, from confronting Ali Bey, thereby enabling him to defeat the ruling mamluks without any actual fighting. Rakim Mehmed Pasha then recognized Ali Bey as shaykh al-balad (chief of the country), effectively top bey and practical ruler of the province.

Rakim Mehmed Pasha was appointed governor of Jeddah Eyalet sometime in 1768. He died in Egypt in 1769 or 1770 and was buried near the Mausoleum of Imam al-Shafi'i in Cairo.

== Bibliography ==
- Crane, Howard, ed. (2000). Hafiz Hüseyin al-Ayvansarayî's Guide to the Muslim Monuments of Ottoman Istanbul. Boston, Leiden and Köln: Brill. ISBN 978-90-04-11242-1.
- Crecelius, Daniel (1981). A Study of the Regimes of 'Ali Bey al-Kabir and Muhammad Bey Abu al-Dhahab, 1760-1775. Minneapolis and Chicago: Bibliotheca Islamica. ISBN 0-88297-029-1.

Political offices
Preceded by Çelebi Mehmed Pasha	Ottoman Governor of Egypt; February 1767–1768	Succeeded by Ali Bey al-Kabir
