= Isidorus (Egyptian rebel) =

Egyptian rebel

Egyptian military commander

Personal details
- Born: c. 139 AD, Egypt
- Died: Egypt

Military service
- Allegiance: Egypt
- Commands: Commander of the Egyptian rebel forces
- Battles/wars: Bucolic War

Isidorus (born c. 139) was an Egyptian priest in the 2nd century during the Roman rule in Egypt. He led the native Egyptian revolt against Roman rule during the reign of Roman emperor Marcus Aurelius.

This revolt broke out in 172–173 as a result of oppressive taxation imposed by Aurelius in the Boucolia marshes (known as the Bucolic war) of the Nile Delta to fund the war in the North. At first the Egyptians were successful, having defeated the Romans in a pitched battle. They almost captured Alexandria after this victory, but Avidius Cassius, the governor of Syria, was sent against them. Cassius separated the rebels and was able to defeat them.

The revolt caused great damage to the Egyptian economy and marked the beginning of Egypt's economic decline.

== See also ==
- List of Egyptians
