= Çapanoğlu Mustafa Ahmed Pasha =

Çapanoğlu Mustafa Ahmed Pasha (died April 1782) was a prominent Ottoman officeholder and a member of the Çapanoğlu family, which he led after the death of his father Ahmed. Among his accomplishments are the construction of the baroque, domed Çapanoğlu Mosque in his native Yozgat, founded by the family.

== Biography ==
After the death of their father, he inherited the family's Bozok sanjak. He and his brother also divided the Mamalu mansion. He kept his tribesmen from disturbing the peace in the region, and fended off the levents, and was soon appointed kapıcıbaşı, a high central post.

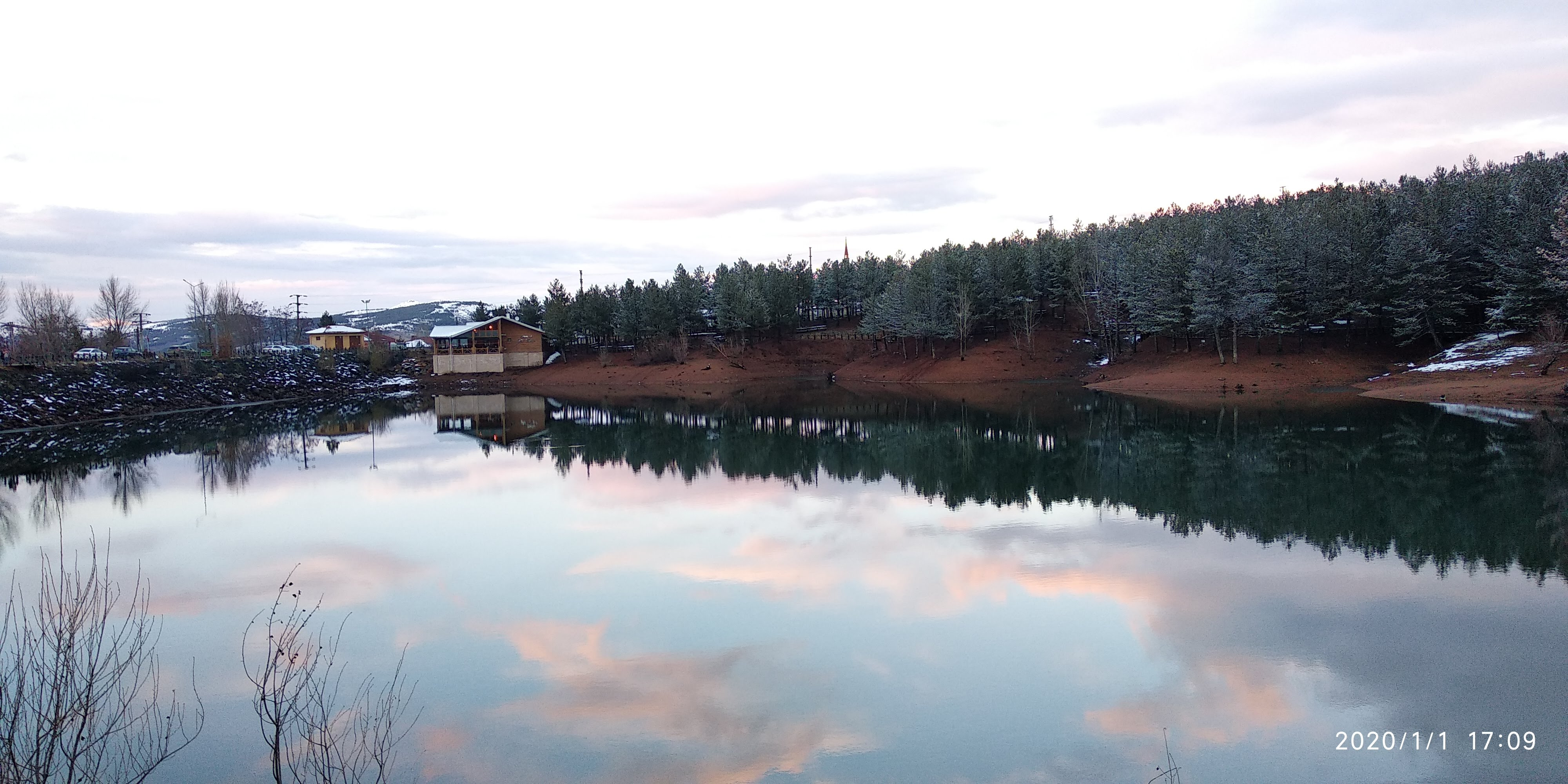
Yozgat, Mustafa's native place

Mustafa stayed loyal to the Sublime Porte in the Russo-Turkish War of (1768–1774). He satisfied the Porte and became a favourite, and his brother Selim Bey came to rule in Sivas, which in 1771 passed to Mustafa. In 1773, Mustafa became trustee of Kayseri sanjak. Mustafa's son Ali Rıza Bey and his brother Süleyman Bey were named kapıcıbaşılıkla, in reward of their services. Meanwhile, though the governor (mutasarriflik) of Bozok changed frequently, the actual control of the tax-farms remained in the Mustafa's hands, who acted as mütesellim.

He was involved in the family's Feud with the Canikli, which they eventually won, but that left him killed. The Çapanoğlu and the Canikli family were both expanding their territory in Anatolia, and their long standing feud escalated in 1772. The titles and the privileges that had been bestowed on Canikli Hacı Ali Pasha (the head of the Canikli family) worried the Çapanoğlu: thanks to their new appointments, the Canikli surrounded the Çapanoğlu's Çankırı sanjak. Bad conduct and failure in the Crimean conflict by the Canikli, atrocities committed there by their head of the family, and the ongoing feud with the Çapanoğlu caused the Porte to take the decision of eliminating the Canikli Haji Ali Pasha. He was stripped of the governorship of Sivas in 1779. Capanoğlu Mustafa Bey, trying to take advantage of the situation, sent a letter to Mikdad Ahmed Pasha in 1779. The latter, who was a pasha with the title of vizier, became infuriated with this affront: Mustafa was in a position inferior to Mikdad. Thus, Mikdad attacked Capanoğlu's lands. However, the Capanoğlu defeated him. Canikli Hacı Ali Pasha then fled to Crimea, while Mikdad was detained in Bursa. In February 1781, however, the Canikli were pardoned by the sultan. It was the sultan's move to check the Çapanoğlu's growth in the region.

Canikli Hacı Ali Pasha became vizier of the province of Erzurum, and his son Mikad governor. The family were also returned their old domains. Mehmed also became the sanjak of Amasya. At this point, the feud between the families was reignited, with the exception that this time it was kept secret: Hacı Ali acted surreptitiously: he got some of his rival's slaves. Next, he had Capanoğlu Mustafa Bey killed by them in the spring of 1782.

His brother Süleyman Bey succeeded him. With him, the family defeated the Canikli, consolidated their power in the region, and expanded their influence throughout Anatolia up to Syria.
