= Constitutional history of Turkey =

Review of Turkish and Ottoman Empire history

Over the centuries, modern-day Turkey has had many constitutions and can be characterised by the steady establishment of a nation-state, democratisation and recognition of international law.

Turkey's constitutional history dates from 1808 to the present. Over the years, Turkey has had many constitutions and radical amendments made to those constitutions. The four main constitutions of Turkey since inception have been the Constitution of 1921, the Constitution of 1924, the Constitution of 1961 and the Constitution of 1982. Prior to these constitutions, Turkey was governed by the Ottoman Empire and other fundamental instruments such as the Sened-I Ittifak, Imperial Edict of Reorganisation, the Ottoman Reform Edict, the Ottoman Constitution of 1876.

The current 1982 Turkish constitution has been ratified nineteen times, with its most recent revision in 2017 which was aimed at improving the rights and liberties of individuals and strengthening the rule of law.

== Fundamental instruments governing Turkey prior to 1921 ==
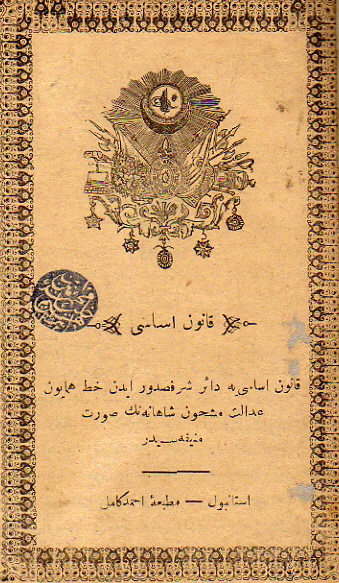
Ottoman constitution of 1876

- 1808: Charter of Alliance prepared by Alemdar Mustafa Pasha, in period of Mahmud II was signed on September 29, among Rumelian and Anatolian chief men and the Ottoman State in order to make the central authority dominant over the provinces. This Charter of Alliance was signed to regulate the powers between the local rulers and the Ottoman government.
- 1839: Edict of Gülhane prepared by Mustafa Reşid Pasha on November 3, during the rule of Abdulmejid I. This document was a proclamation by Abdulmejid I which reorganised the Ottoman Empire and introduced various reforms.
- 1856: Ottoman Reform Edict of 1856 that complemented and reinforced the Imperial Edict of Reorganisation. It promised equality of access to education, government appointments, military service, and administration of justice to all, regardless of religion, language, or race.
- 1876: Constitution of the Ottoman Empire enacted during the First Constitutional Era (1876–78) and was viewed as a symbol of freedom for its Turkish citizens. Subsequently, the constitution was revised in 1909 during the Second Constitutional Era of the Ottoman Empire (1908–20).

== The Constitution of 1921 ==
The Turkish Constitution of 1921 was a fundamental law for Turkey from 1921 to 1924. It is generally accepted that the Constitution was the result of the most democratic constitution-making process in Turkish history. It was crafted by an elected constituent assembly in which different groups and ideologies were not only present, but also actively participated.

The draft constitution was prepared by the council of ministers in the form of a legislative proposal, and sent to the general assembly. The general assembly debated legal and procedural problems related to the proposal, and decided to send it to an ad hoc special commission as a document comprising 31 articles. The commission that worked on the draft divided it into two parts: the "program of populism" and "the Basic Establishment Act (1921 Constitution)". The program of populism was a declaration of political purposes and views rather than being normative. Therefore, it was separated from the constitutional rules and declared as a government program reflecting anti-imperialist and anti-capitalist, left populist ideas, as well as civil control over the military. The latter part became the actual constitution and made the revolutionary choice of unconditional sovereignty of the nation, marking a significant break with the imperial and monarchical past.

The 1921 constitution was very short. It contained 23 articles and an individual article, which addressed issues of power, local governments and their jurisdiction.

The Constitution was created after the collapse of the Ottoman Empire in the aftermath of the First World War. Mustafa Kemal Atatürk, who then became Turkey's first President was a key driver in preparing this Constitution. Mustafa Kemal announced the election of a new assembly to meet in Turkey's capital, Ankara. This was named the Grand National Assembly of Turkey and held both the executive and legislative powers. Article 3 of the Constitution stated that "[t]he State of Turkey is governed by the Grand National Assembly and its government is titled as the Government of Grand National Assembly." This Assembly could change ministers at will and the Council Ministers had no power to dissolve the Assembly. This was due to both the executive and legislative powers being vested in the Assembly.

Nevertheless, this Assembly enacted the 1921 Constitution, which had a profound place in Turkey's constitutional history. It was the first constitution which declared Turkey a secular republic and moved away from the monarchist system established by the Ottoman Empire. The Constitution took sovereignty away from the Sultan and gave this right to the public. In Article 1 of the Constitution, it proclaimed the principle of national sovereignty and stated that "sovereignty [was] vested upon the nation without condition."

== The Constitution of 1924 ==
The Turkish Constitution of 1924 was the longest constitution, remaining in force for 36 years from 1924 to 1961. The Assembly was renewed in the middle of 1923 and decided to create a new constitution, which was adopted by a majority of the Assembly on 20 April 1924. Initially, it was titled the "Constitution of the Republic of Turkey" and is often referred to as the first Constitution of Turkey.

This Constitution was codified similarly to the 1921 Constitution and retained the fundamental principles found in the earlier Constitution; however, it was much more detailed and consisted of 105 articles.

The principle of national sovereignty remained. Similar to the 1921 Constitution, the Turkish Grand National Assembly was considered to be the "sole representative of the nation". According to 1924 Constitution both the legislative and executive powers were embodied in the Assembly. However, the 1924 Constitution approached to a "parliamentary democracy" by giving the Assembly the power to supervise and dismiss the government although the government and the president did not have the power to dissolve the Assembly. Nevertheless, judicial power was completely independent. That is why the 1924 constitution was characterised as a step towards a parliamentary system and separation of powers.

This Constitution also embodied subjects such as fundamental rights and freedoms. As to the relevant articles, everyone was equal before the law, torture and cruel or unusual punishment were forbidden, personal freedom, freedom of conscience and religion, as well as freedom of thought and expression were guaranteed in addition to all civilian and political rights and freedoms.

However, one problematic aspect of 1924 Constitution was the presence of an article stating that the "official religion of the state [was] Islam", an idea against secularism and one which was not present in the 1921 Constitution.

This Constitution was amended seven times in total, two of which can be considered modal amendments. The most important amendments were that in 1928, the article stating the "religion of the state as Islam" was removed and secularism was introduced. In addition, in the 1934 amendment, women's rights to vote and be elected to parliament was also recognised.

In 1937, the values of republicanism, nationalism, populism, statism and reformism were also embodied in the constitution.

The 1924 constitution was maintained without change after the transition to a multi-party system in 1946 however, it came to an end in May 1960 after a military takeover. The revolutionary officers, with the help of opposition parties, started to prepare a new constitution to establish a "more pluralistic mode of democracy", with all its attendant safeguards, while maintaining the modern and secular nature of the state.

== The Constitution of 1961 ==
The Turkish Constitution of 1961 was enacted after Turkey' first military coup in May 1960. When the militants took charge, they dissolved the Assembly, imprisoned the President (Celal Bayar at the time), Prime Minister (Adnan Menderes, who was later hanged) and all the members of the Assembly.

The Constitution of 1961 was adopted by a referendum in May 1961, with 61.7% of the nation voting in its favour. It was composed of 157 main articles and 11 temporary articles. This constitution introduced a modified system of checks, establishing a bicameral system consisting of the Senate and the National Assembly. In doing so, it limited the authority of the government; the powers of the president were curtailed, and individual rights and liberties were given greater emphasis. The Constitution focused on issues such as fundamental rights and freedoms, working life, the right to form a trade union, the right to collective bargaining and strike, freedom of the press and communication, political rights. It also contained a long bill of rights and limited the powers of the executive.

The 1961 constitution was distinct from the previous 1924 constitution because of the relative importance it placed on the notion of democracy which shifted from majority to pluralism. In addition, it sought to expand and strengthen basic human rights. This constitution was also the first time Turkey adopted constitutional review and established the Constitutional Court. Hence, this constitution has been regarded as the most liberal constitution in Turkish history.

Nevertheless, although, the main objective of the militant leaders was to restore the democratic process, they also wished to protect their own interests. Thus, the constitution was drafted in such a way, so as to provide concessions to those in power.

This constitution was amended seven times. The first amendment was made in November 1969 and the last one in April 1974. However, due to political instability and growing tension between right wing and left wing groups, there was military intervention in September 1980, which saw the introduction of the 1982 constitution.

== The Constitution of 1982 ==
Current Constitution of Turkey is the product of a successful military coup on 12 September 1980. After this intervention, on 9 November 1982, the military regime (the National Security Council, (NSC) regime) enacted the constitution presently in force. From inception, the NSC expressed its intent on restoring democracy and restructuring Turkey's democratic system. Hence, when drafting this constitution, it abolished the bicameral system and reintroduced the unicameral system. It also strengthened the power of the executive and asserted that Turkey was a secular and democratic republic, deriving its sovereignty from its people.

The primary aim of the constitution was to restore the state's authority and therefore protect it from the actions of its citizens, rather than protecting the individual liberties from the encroachments of the state. This was supported by the preamble which stated that "no protection shall be afforded to thoughts or opinions contrary to Turkish national interest."

Thus, in comparison to the 1961 constitution, the present 1982 constitution was more casuistic or specific in details. It was also more difficult to change, was more transitional and shifted the balance between authority and freedom towards the former. In doing so, it strengthened the power of the executive branch of government, avoided deadlocks in the political decision-making mechanism and was less lenient towards participatory democracy.

Like its predecessor, the 1982 constitution includes a detailed bill of rights covering the social, economic, and political rights and liberties of citizens. According to Article 5, all individuals are equal before the law and possess "inherent fundamental rights and freedoms which are inviolable and inalienable." However, articles 10 through to 15 authorise the government to restrict individual rights in the interest of safeguarding the "integrity of the state" and "the public interest."

Thus, in sum, the 1982 constitution was designed to support a strong central government and limited political freedom envisaged in Turkey's previous constitutions.

This constitution has been amended nineteen times. Three of these amendments, which occurred in 2007, 2010 and 2017 were a result of a successful referendum. The most recent amendments occurred in after the 2017 referendum. The general direction of these amendments was to improve the rights and liberties afforded to individuals, strengthen the rule of law and limit the prerogative powers granted to the military.

== See also ==
- 2023 Turkish constitutional crisis
