= Sanjak of Kocaeli =

Ottoman province in northwestern Anatolia

Coordinates: 40.852°N 29.878°E

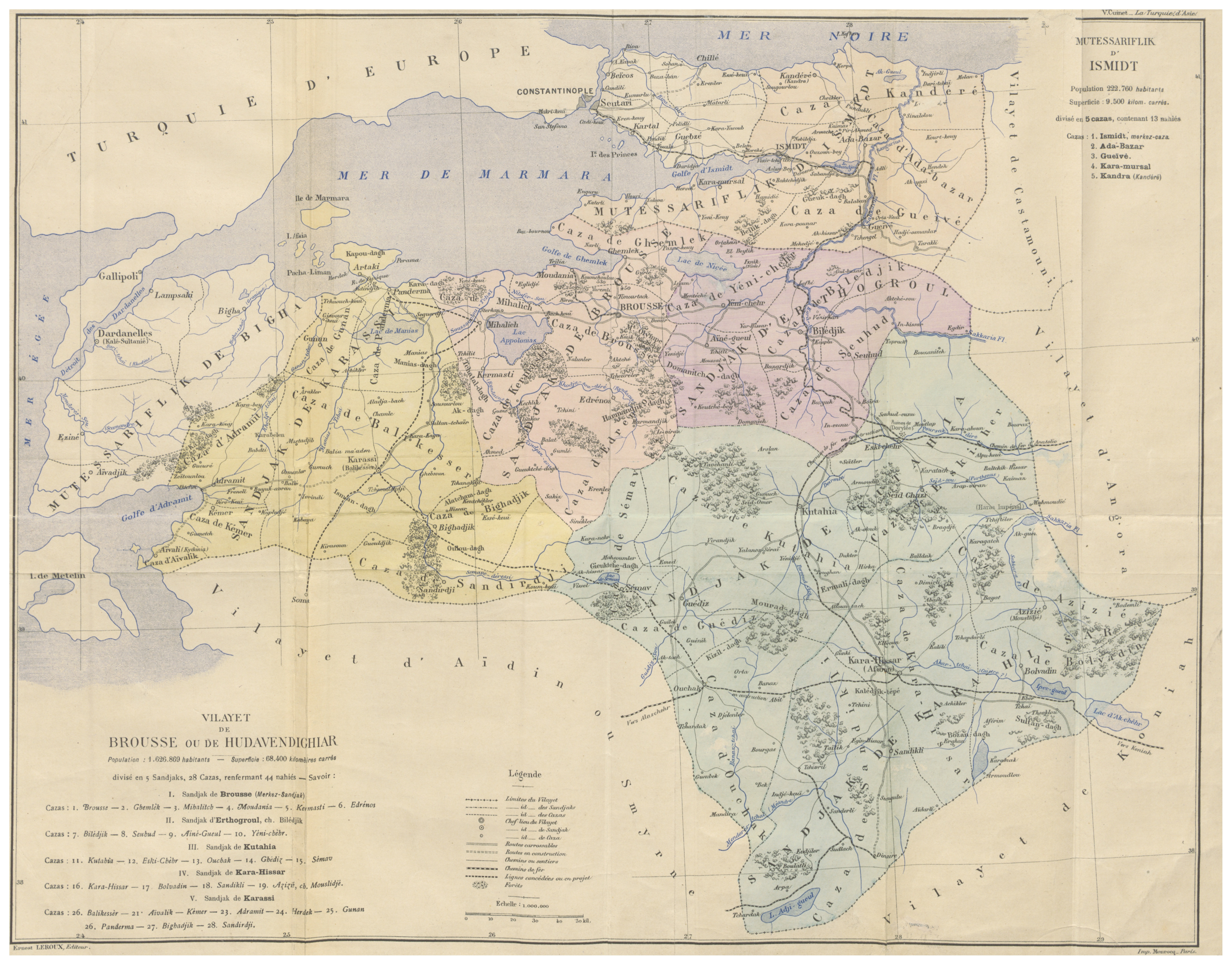
Map of the Hüdavendigâr Eyalet in 1895

The Sanjak of Kocaeli was a second-level Ottoman province (sanjak or liva) with capital at Iznikmid/Izmid (Byzantine Nicomedia, modern Izmit).

== History ==
Kocaeli derives its name from Akça Khodja, an Ottoman Turkish warleader who began the conquest of the region from the Byzantine Empire. His domain (in Turkish Koca-ili or Koca-eli, "land of the Khodja") was recognized as a sanjak, already during the reign of Orhan I, sometime between 1327–1338, making it one of the earliest sanjaks of the Ottoman Empire. Its capital was Iznikmid (Nicomedia, modern Izmit), which was conquered by the Ottomans sometime between 1331 and 1338. With the establishment of the Anatolia Eyalet it became part of it until 1533, when it was added to the newly created Eyalet of the Archipelago. The woods of the province allowed the city to become the site of a major naval arsenal, especially during the Köprülü era.

A Rough Map of Kocaeli Sanjak around 1530, with Major Cities and Trade Routes

In the 16th-century, the Sanjak of Kocaeli comprised the kazas of İznikmid, Ada, Gebze (Gegivize), İznik, Kandıra, Şile, Yalakabad and Yoros.

It remained part of the Eyalet of the Archipelago until the Tanzimat reforms of the 19th century; by 1846, it had been transferred to the Kastamonu Eyalet. In 1855 it passed to Hüdavendigâr Eyalet (and its successor Hüdavendigâr Vilayet after 1867). From there it was transferred to the Istanbul Vilayet in 1870, before returning briefly to Hüdavendigâr (1871), becoming an independent sanjak in 1872, and returning to Istanbul in 1876. In 1887, the Sanjak of Kocaeli (increasingly known as Izmid, after its capital) returned to the jurisdiction of the Hüdavendigâr Vilayet.

== Sources ==
- Birken, Andreas [in German] (1976). Die Provinzen des Osmanischen Reiches [The Provinces of the Ottoman Empire]. Beihefte zum Tübinger Atlas des Vorderen Orients, 13 (in German). Reichert. ISBN 3-920153-56-1.
- de Groot, A. H. (1986). "Ķodja Eli". In Bosworth, C. E.; van Donzel, E.; Lewis, B. & Pellat, Ch. (eds.). The Encyclopaedia of Islam, Second Edition. Volume V: Khe–Mahi. Leiden: E. J. Brill. p. 250. ISBN 978-90-04-07819-2.
- Faroqhi, Suraiya (2004). "Izmīd". In Bearman, P. J.; Bianquis, Th.; Bosworth, C. E.; van Donzel, E. & Heinrichs, W. P. (eds.). The Encyclopaedia of Islam, Second Edition. Volume XII: Supplement. Leiden: E. J. Brill. pp. 476–477. ISBN 978-90-04-13974-9.
