= Anatolia Eyalet =

Administrative division of the Ottoman Empire from 1393 to 1841

ایالت آناطولی Eyālet-i Anaṭolı
- Eyalet of the Ottoman Empire
- 1393–1841
- Flag

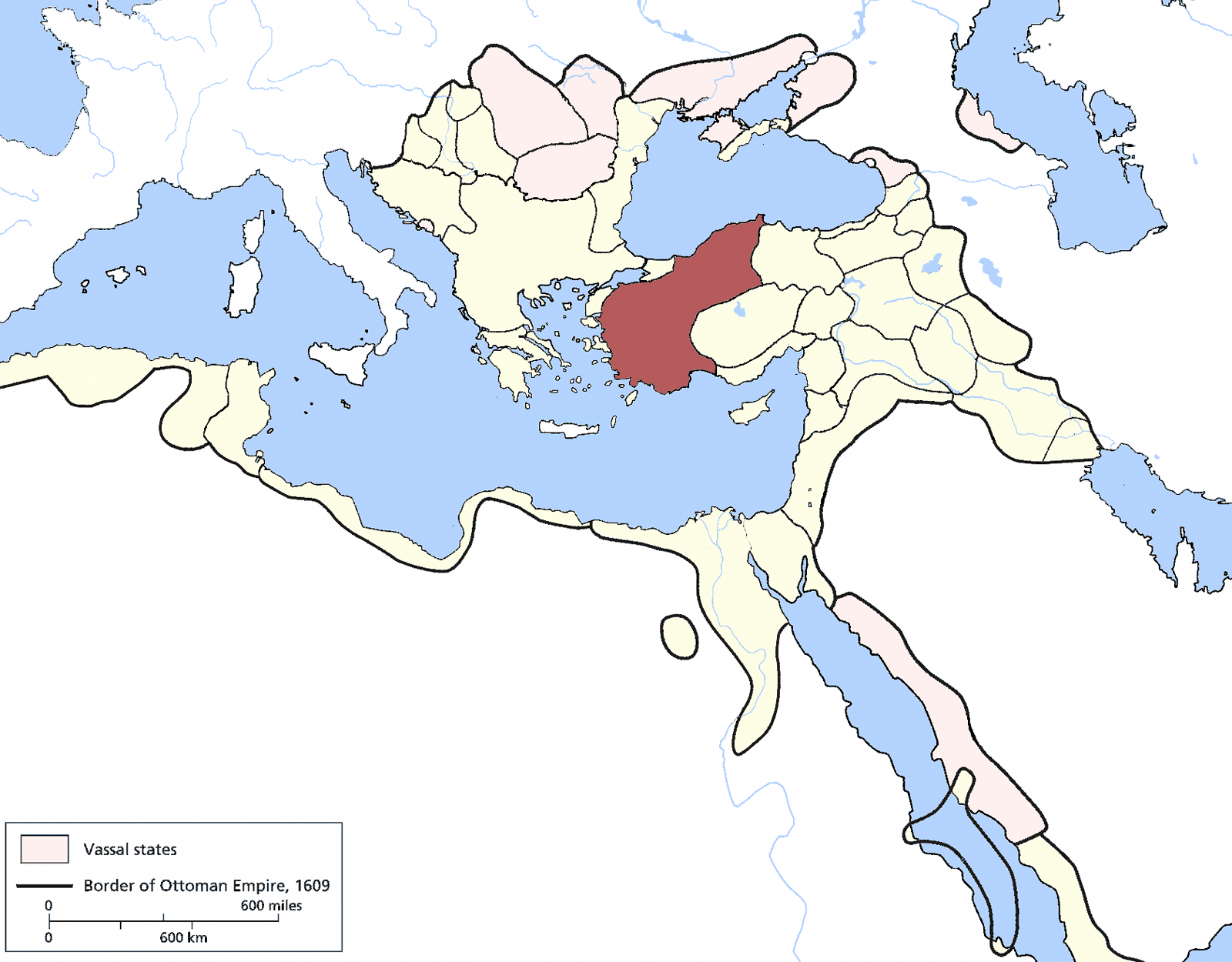
- The Anatolia Eyalet in 1609
- Capital: Ankara, Kütahya
- Area
  - Coordinates: 39.1438°N 28.8080°E
- History
  - Established: 1393
  - Disestablished: 1841
Preceded by
Ottoman emirate
Byzantine Empire under the Palaiologos dynasty
Succeeded by
Aydin Eyalet
Ankara Eyalet
Hüdavendigâr Eyalet
Kastamonu Eyalet
- Today part of: Turkey

The Eyalet of Anatolia (Ottoman Turkish: ایالت آناطولی, romanized: Eyālet-i Anaṭolı) was one of the two core provinces (Rumelia being the other) in the early years of the Ottoman Empire. It was established in 1393. Its capital was first Ankara in central Anatolia, but then moved to Kütahya in western Anatolia. Its reported area in the 19th century was 65,804 square miles (170,430 km^{2}).

The establishment of the province of Anatolia is held to have been in 1393, when Sultan Bayezid I (r. 1389–1402) appointed Kara Timurtash as beylerbey and viceroy was in Anatolia, during Bayezid's absence on campaign in Europe against Mircea I of Wallachia. The province of Anatolia—initially termed beylerbeylik or generically vilayet ("province"), only after 1591 was the term eyalet used—was the second to be formed after the Rumelia Eyalet, and ranked accordingly in the hierarchy of the provinces. The first capital of the province was Ankara, but in the late 15th century it was moved to Kütahya.

As part of the Tanzimat reforms, the Anatolia Eyalet was dissolved c. 1841 and divided into smaller provinces, although various scholars give conflicting dates for the dissolution, from as early as 1832 to as late as 1864.

== Administrative divisions ==
The eyalet consisted of seventeen sanjacks (liva) in 1530
1. Sanjak of Saruhan
2. Sanjak of Kütahya
3. Sanjak of Aydın
4. Sanjak of Menteşe
5. Sanjak of Teke
6. Sanjak of Hamid-ili
7. Sanjak of Karahisar-ı Sahib
8. Sanjak of Sultan-Öni
9. Sanjak of Hüdavendigar
10. Sanjak of Koca-ili
11. Sanjak of Bolu
12. Sanjak of Kastamonu
13. Sanjak of Kankırı (Çankırı)
14. Sanjak of Ankara
15. Sanjak of Alaiyye
16. Sanjak of Karesi
17. Sanjak of Biga

The eyalet consisted of seventeen sanjacks (liva) in 1550-51
1. Sanjak of Saruhan
2. Sanjak of Kütahya
3. Sanjak of Aydın
4. Sanjak of Menteşe
5. Sanjak of Teke
6. Sanjak of Hamid-ili
7. Sanjak of Karahisar-ı Sahib
8. Sanjak of Sultan-Öni
9. Sanjak of Hüdavendigar
10. Sanjak of Koca-ili
11. Sanjak of Bolu
12. Sanjak of Kastamonu
13. Sanjak of Kankırı (Çankırı)
14. Sanjak of Ankara
15. Sanjak of Alaiyye
16. Sanjak of Karesi
17. Sanjak of Biga
The eyalet consisted of fifteen sanjaks in 1609:
1. Sanjak of Kütahya (Liva-i Kütahya, Pasha Sanjakı , Kütahya)
2. Sanjak of Saruhan (Liva-i Saruhan Hass-ı Mîr Liva, (Manisa)
3. Sanjak of Aydin (Liva-i Aydın, Aydın)
4. Sanjak of Hüdavendigâr (Liva-i Hüdavendigâr, Bursa)
5. Sanjak of Kastamonu (Liva-i Kastamonu, Kastamonu)
6. Sanjak of Menteşe (Liva-i Menteşe, Muğla)
7. Sanjak of Bolu (Liva-i Bolu, Bolu)
8. Sanjak of Ankara (Liva-i Bankara, Ankara)
9. Sanjak of Karahisar-i Sahib (Liva-i Karahisar-ı Sahib, Afyonkarahisar)
10. Sanjak of Teke (Liva-i Teke, Antalya)
11. Sanjak of Kangırı (Liva-i Kangırı, Çankırı)
12. Sanjak of Hamid (Liva-i Hamid, Isparta)
13. Sanjak of Sultanönü (Liva-i Sultanönü, Eskişehir)
14. Sanjak of Karasi (Liva-i Karasi, Balıkesir)

The eyalet consisted of fifteen sanjaks between 1700 and 1740:
1. Sanjak of Kütahya (Pasha Sanjakı, Kütahya)
2. Sanjak of Hüdavendigâr (Bursa)
3. Sanjak of Bolu (Bolu)
4. Sanjak of Kastamonu (Kastamonu)
5. Sanjak of Karasi (Balıkesir)
6. Sanjak of Sultanönü (Eskişehir)
7. Sanjak of Saruhan (Manisa)
8. Sanjak of Karahisar-i Sahib (Afyonkarahisar)
9. Sanjak of Hamid (Isparta)
10. Sanjak of Ankara (Ankara)
11. Sanjak of Kânkırı (Çankırı)
12. Sanjak of Aydin (Aydın)
13. Sanjak of Teke (Antalya)
14. Sanjak of Menteşe (Muğla)
15. Sanjak of Beybazarı (Beypazarı)
