= Constitution of 1921 =

The Constitution of 1921 may refer to the:

- March Constitution of Poland
- Turkish Constitution of 1921
- Louisiana Constitution of 1921
- Vidovdan Constitution - first constitution of the Kingdom of Serbs, Croats and Slovenes passed on 28 June 1921
