= Çapanoğlu dynasty =

Turkish noble family

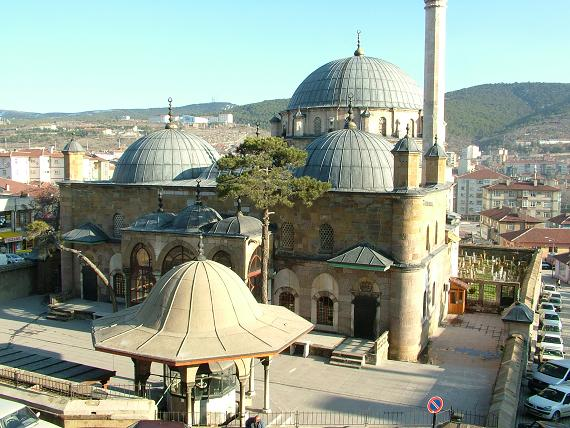
The Çapanoğlu Mosque was built by the family in 1729

The Çapanoğlu dynasty, also Cebbarzâdeler, Çaparzâdeler and Çaparoğulları, is a Turkish dynasty that originates in the 17th-century Ottoman Empire and was once one of the most prominent Ottoman families. They became one of the most powerful dynasties in the empire in the 18th century.

The family was founded by the Turkoman Ömer Ağa, who had a son, Ahmet Ağa, credited as the founder of Yozgat, who rose to prominence in the region of Bozok. In the time of Süleyman Bey, Capanoğlu Ahmed Pasha's son, the family thrived in Bozok, and expanded to Ankara, Aleppo, Çankırı, Çorum, Amasya, Şarkikarahisar, Sivas, Kayseri, Kırşehir, Nevşehir, Konya Ereğli, Niğde, Tarsus, Adana, Rakka, and Gaziantep. Çapanoğlu Ahmed Ağa built a mosque in Saray village in 1749, and madrasah in Yozgat in 1753. His son Hacı Mustafa Bey built the baroque and domed Çapanoğlu Mosque. At the same time, Yozgat grew through the 80 shops and the inn he allocated. The family reached its peak with Süleyman Bey, who held political, military, and economic dominance in the region, and influence in the empire. He also managed well the feud with the rival Canikli family. Süleyman Bey also expanded the Çapanoğlu Mosque, built a school, his famous mansion, and expanded the city with sixty shops and a hammam (Turkish bathhouse).

Members of the family, such as Abdülfettah Efendi, were part of the ilmiye, while, in the modern period, others became prominent journalists and authors. The family contributed with provisions and soldiers to both the Russo-Turkish War of 1768–1774 and the Russo-Turkish War of 1787–1792. In the latter conflict, Süleyman Bey himself led 4000 of his soldiers to the front.

== History ==
=== Origin and rise to power ===
The family settled in the Bozok sanjak in the middle of the 17th century. The earliest known ancestor of the family is the Mamalu Turkmen Ömer Ağa (died 1704), the son of Çapar Ömer Ağa. The Mamalu Turkmen were subordinate to Hodja, subject to the Tokat voivodeship, and lived in Bozok as nomads. Ahmed Ağa, who was able to unite the diverse people in the region, became voivoda of the New Province in 1728, voivoda of the Mamalu Turkmen in 1732, and voivode of the Bozok sanjak in 1732. He would also provide soldiers and food to Istanbul whenever needed. Specifically, he helped with the shortages of meat in the capital. He was rewarded with the post of tax-farmer (voyvoda) of the region.

He ruled the region for many years, becoming the most powerful man thereof. He had the Tokat voivodeship for a while, and in 1761 became the governor (vali) of Sivas, a post he kept for two years. He was then given Çorum as appanage (as arpalik). In 1764 he gained Nigde as well after he succeeded in keeping the bandits away from the region. Ahmed had two sons, Mustafa and Süleyman. They inherited the Mamalu mansion. After Ahmed's death, his brother Mustafa Bey was given the Bozok sanjak. He kept his tribesmen from disturbing the peace, and fended off the levents, and was soon appointed kapıcıbaşı, a high central post.

Mustafa stayed loyal to the Sublime Porte in the Russo-Turkish War of (1768–1774). He satisfied the Sublime Porte and became a favourite, and his brother Selim Bey came to rule in Sivas. In 1771 Sivas passed to Mustafa. In 1773, Mustafa became trustee of Kayseri sanjak. Mustafa's son Ali Rıza Bey and his brother Süleyman Bey were named kapıcıbaşılıkla, in reward for their services. Meanwhile, though the governor (mutasarriflik) of Bozok changed frequently, the actual control of the tax-farms remained in the family's hand, with Mustafa as mütesellim.

=== Feud with the Canikli ===
There was a feud between them and the Canikli family, who were both expanding their territory in Anatolia. This conflict escalated in 1772. The titles and the privileges that had been bestowed on Canikli Hacı Ali Pasha (the head of the Canikli family) worried the Çapanoğlu: thanks to their new appointments, the Canikli surrounded the Çapanoğlu's Çankırı sanjak. Bad conduct and failure in the Crimean conflict by the Canikli, and their ongoing feud, caused the Sublime Porte to take the decision of eliminating the Canikli Haji Ali Pasha. He was stripped of the governorship of Sivas in 1779. Capanoğlu Mustafa Bey, trying to take advantage of the situation, sent a letter to Mikdad Ahmed Pasha in 1779. The latter who was a pasha with the title of vizier, became infuriated with this affront: Çapanoğlu was in a position inferior to Mikdad. Thus, Mikdad attacked Capanoğlu's lands. However, the Capanoğlu defeated him. Canikli Hacı Ali Pasha then fled to the Crimea, while Mikdad was detained in Bursa.

However, by February 1781, the Canikli were pardoned. It was the sultan's move to check the Çapanoğlu's power in the region.

Canikli Hacı Ali Pasha became vizier of the province Erzurum (Erzurum Eyalet), and his son Mikad governor of the same, while the family were returned their old domains. Mehmed also became the sanjak of Amasya. At this point, the feud between the families was reignited, with the exception that this time it was kept secret. The Canikli were more prudent: instead of openly attacking, Hacı Ali got some of his rival's slaves. Next, he had Capanoğlu Mustafa Bey killed by them. It was the spring of 1782.

=== Return to power and expansion ===
With Süleyman Bey came the most prosperous period of the Çapanoğlu. He was smart and cautious in his dealings with the Sublime Porte. With him the family dominated in Bozok and extended their sphere of influence throughout Anatolia all the way to Aleppo and Raqqa in Syria. Süleyman Bey was the voivode of the New Province since 1783. He continued to appease Istanbul, such as in 1786, when he sent 1000 soldiers to suppress the turmoil in Egypt. He became governor Çankırı sanjak in 1787 and of the Ankara sanjak next year.

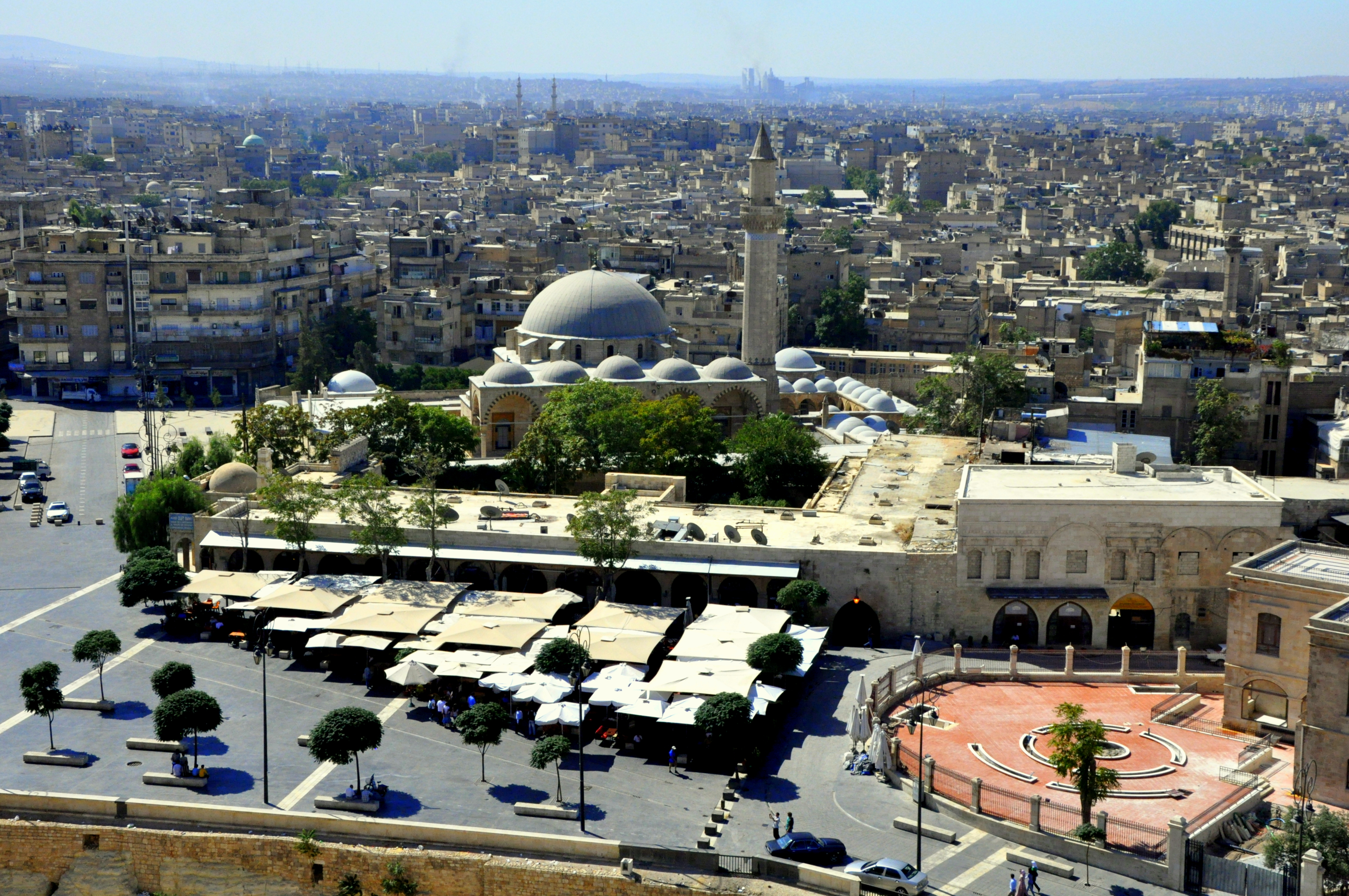
Aleppo

He contributed with grain and soldiers to the Russo-Turkish War of (1787–1792). He went to the Rumelian front with 4000 soldiers in 1790, joining the expedition himself. The family headed their own troops to the front at the Danube in 1790. Süleyman Bey's son Abdülfettah was named kapıcıbaşı. Süleyman maintained his dominance and in 1794 secured the Fertile and Bozkır mines for himself and his associates from Tarsus and Andana sanjaks. Some troubles with the Sublime Porte followed. However, he suppressed uprisings in and around his region, and sent soldiers to help against the Pazvandoğlu revolt in Rumelia and fight in the French occupation in Egypt. He helped in the establishment of the new Anatolian army, providing soldiers and building barracks. Selim III gave him the Amasya sanjak, provided he establishes the Nizam-ı Cedid by 1805. The sultan then also gave the governorship of Sivas to Süleyman's son Mehmed Celaleddin Pasha as a vizier. This post had been coveted by Tayyar Mahmud Pasha, grandson of Canikli Haci Ali Pasha, who was not able to obtain it two years before.

Tayyar Mahmud Pasha started recruiting soldiers to go to war against the Çapanoğlu. The sultan was worried about what was going on. He stripped the Çapanoğlu of the Amasya sanjak. Süleyman Bey respected the sultan's decision. Tayyar Mahmud Pasha, however, was not satisfied yet. He declared that he would abolish the îrâd-ı cedî ("new revenue" coming from previously untaxed subjects, which was supporting the army), and occupied Amasya in June 1805. He then seized Tokat and Zile, which belonged to the Çapanoğlu. At this point, the Capanoğlu decided to take action. The Sublime Porte declared Tayyar Mahmud Pasha fermanlı ("outlawed"). Defeated, Tayyar fled to Crimea. In the end, Süleyman Bey also regained the Amasya sanjak.

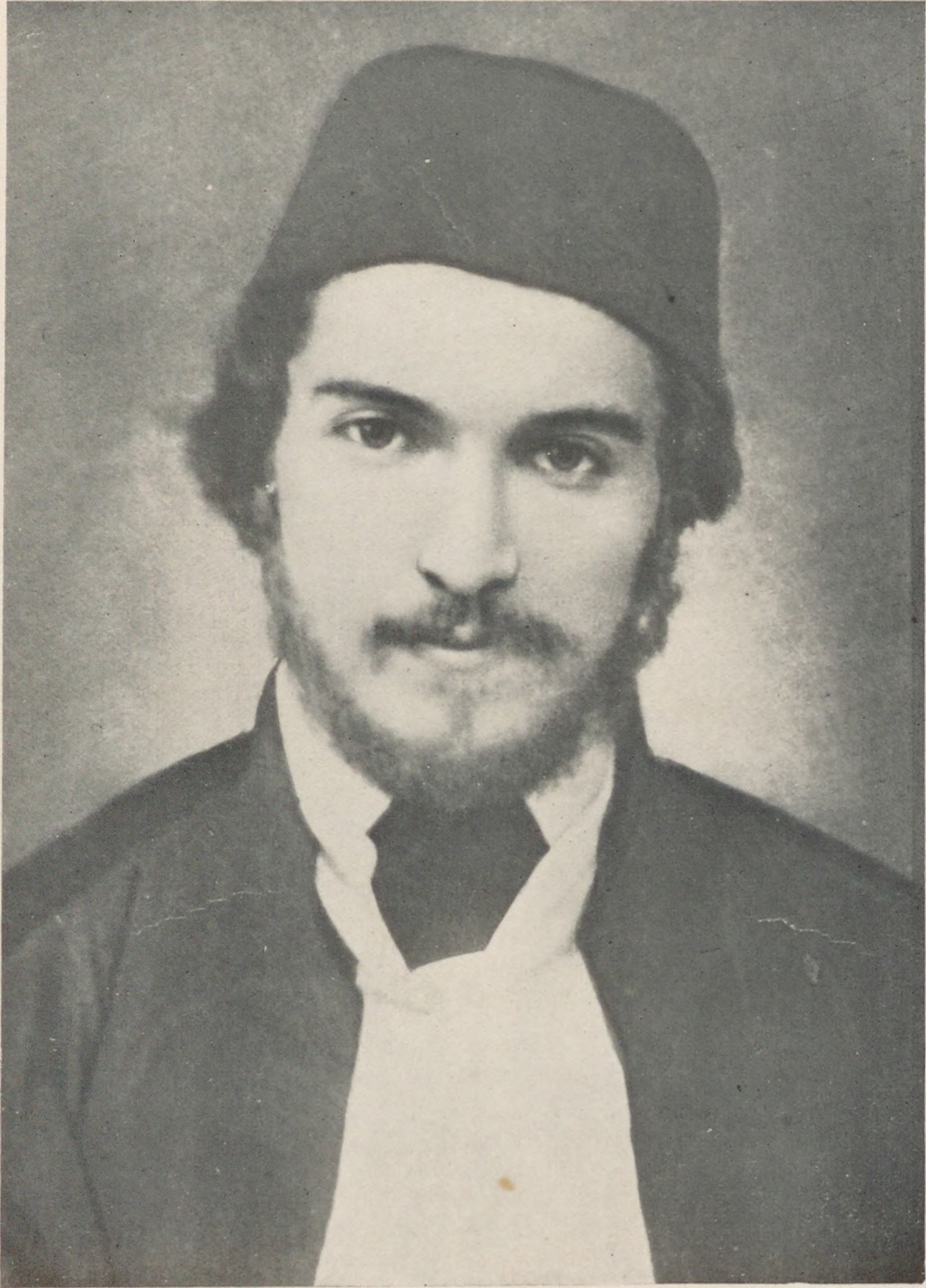
Çapanoğlu Agah Efendi

With the Kabakçı Mustafa revolt in May, the Nizam-ı Cedid ended. Amasya sanjak was taken from Süleyman Bey after the sultan was deposed (Süleyman had supported the Nizam-ı Cedid). His son Mehmed Celaleddin Pasha was removed from Governor of Sivas, and instead appointed Governor of Diyarbekir. Tayyar Mahmud Pasha, who had opposed Nizam-ı Cedid, was pardoned and given Trabzon, and Canik and Şarkîkarahisar ad a governor. However, Süleyman Bey's son soon became governor of Sivas again. Another sultan, Mahmud, came to the throne. The new sultan executed Tayyar Mahmud Pasha.

Süleyman Bey signed the Charter of Alliance in 1808. He then established the Sekban-i Djedid Army in his region, sending troops to the front in the ongoing war with Russia, in which conflict his son Mehmed, Governor of Sivas, was captured. Süleyman Bey became voivode of Şarkîkarahisar sanjak in 1808, Kayseri sanjak in 1810, and got the trusteeship of Kırşehir sanjak in 1811.

He died two years later, in 1813. Mahmud II wouldn't give the Bozok sanjak to a member of Çapanoğlu, because of his policy of centralization. Thus, the Çapanoğlu were generally employed outside Yozgat. Abbas Hilmi Pasha, Suleyman Bey's son, died in 1859. Mahmud, another son, became governor of Tripoli (1847).

Ömer Hulusi Efendi Çapanoğlu's son Âgâh, a journalist, went on to become a historical figure of Turkish postal and press. He served as Minister of Post Office (1861), and among other things was governor in Rhodes and Lesbos (1884-1885). Another descendant, Müşir Şakir, was governor of Ruse, Baghdad, and Herzegovina, and deputy governor of Crete, among other posts.

=== Çapanoğlu Uprising ===
The Çapanoğlu's influence decreased with the War of Independence. On June 7, 1920, Chief of the General Staff Miralay İsmet Bey ordered the arrest the Çapanoğlu brothers in Sivas, charging Miralay Selâhaddin Bey with the task. Edip Bey was once a supporter of the Committee of Union and Progress and the MP. He eventually became an opponent, to the point that he was expelled from the CUP. He wasn't even allowed to go back to his position as governor, and was sent back to his hometown. He then joined the Liberal Entente. Edip Bey, like the people of his region, did not oppose the nationalists on religious or ideological grounds, but because he was against the CUP, and because of the lack of authority in the region and War-weariness of the people.

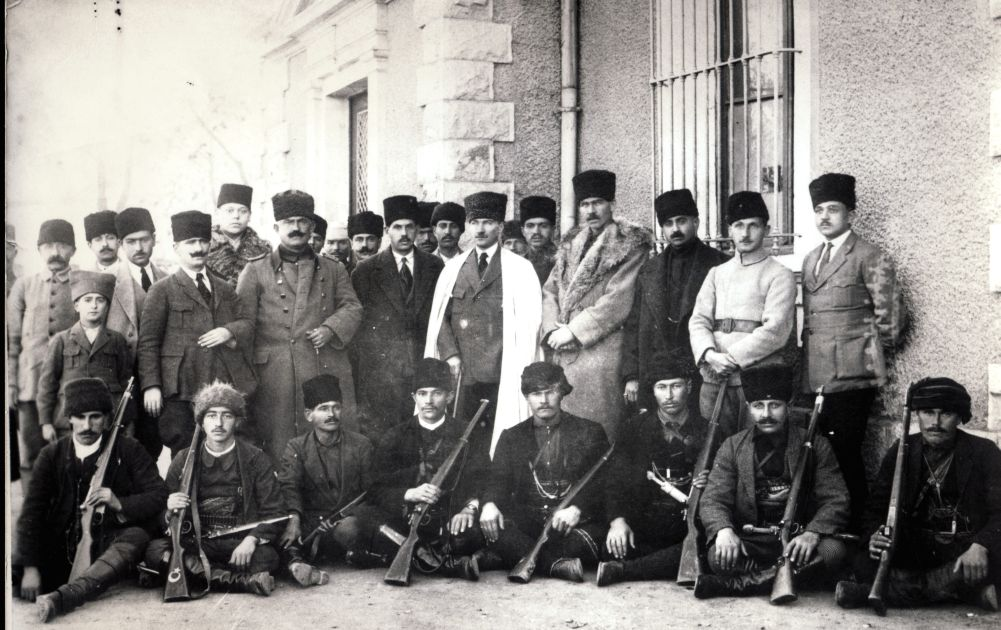
Ethem the Circassian was sent to suppress the Çapanoğlu Uprising on 20 June 1920

There were initially some incidents in the region, but the Çapanoğlu refrained from participating. Eventually, however, Celal and Salih Çapanoğlu decided to oppose the nationalists. Among the issues there were disagreements on money collection for the nationalists. Ankara was informed by the Yozgat mufti, and sent Ali Kılıç to seize control of the region, check fundraising and surveil the family, which disturbed its members. On 8 June 1920 they left the city and started organizing the anti-nationalists. On 14 June they returned to the city. They started the uprising by releasing the prisoners from the jail. Meanwhile, Çapanoğlu Mehmet Aga was set to fight Ankara by the sultan with a 1500-men force. The family managed to take control of Yozgat. The Circassian Çerkez Ethem Bey was then sent to suppress the uprising. On 20 June he moved from Ankara and on 23 June he was in Yozgat. He took the city the same day. Some of the leaders managed to leave. They went to territories settled by Circassians, and were sheltered by them. The Çapanoğlu and their forces were defeated by the government of the Grand National Assembly. Çerkez Ethem Bey executed twelve rebels. Among them were Çapanoğlu Mahmud Bey and Vâsıf Bey. Halid Bey, who was captured later, was sentenced to death and hanged. Yusuf Ziya Bey managed to flee to Syria. Edib and Celâl were pardoned and exiled to Istanbul. Salih Bey, another brother, did not participate in the rebellion and was not persecuted.

Çapanoğlu Mansion in Yozgat was looted and destroyed during the rebellion. Ethem demolished the family's buildings, and set fire to the Çapanoğlu family houses and farms. Etham then carried out a raid on a village of Circassians, executing 23 Circassians after the uprising was suppressed. Their influence over the area had now ceased.

Münir Süleyman Çapanoğlu (1894-1973), a prominent Turkish writer and journalist, was from this family.

Çapanoğlu Ahmed Ağa built a mosque in Saray near Yozgat in 1749, and a madrasah in Yozgat four years later, also allocating foundations. Hacı Mustafa Bey, his son, built a domed mosque in Yozgat in 1779, known as Câmi-i Kebir or Çapanoğlu Mosque. Haci Mustafa Bey built a fountain and a tomb in the mosque, built in baroque style and similar to Istanbul's Nuruosmaniye and Ayazma Mosque. Yozgat grew into an administrative and commercial center thanks to the eighty shops that Çapanoğlu Ahmed Ağa allocated there.
