= Angora Province =

Angora Province may refer to:

- Ankara Eyalet
- Ankara Vilayet
