= Constitution of 1961 =

The Constitution of 1961 may refer to the

- Turkish Constitution of 1961
- South African Constitution of 1961
