= Constitution of 1924 =

Constitution of 1924 may refer to:

- 1924 Soviet Constitution
- Turkish Constitution of 1924
