= Canikli family =

Ottoman family

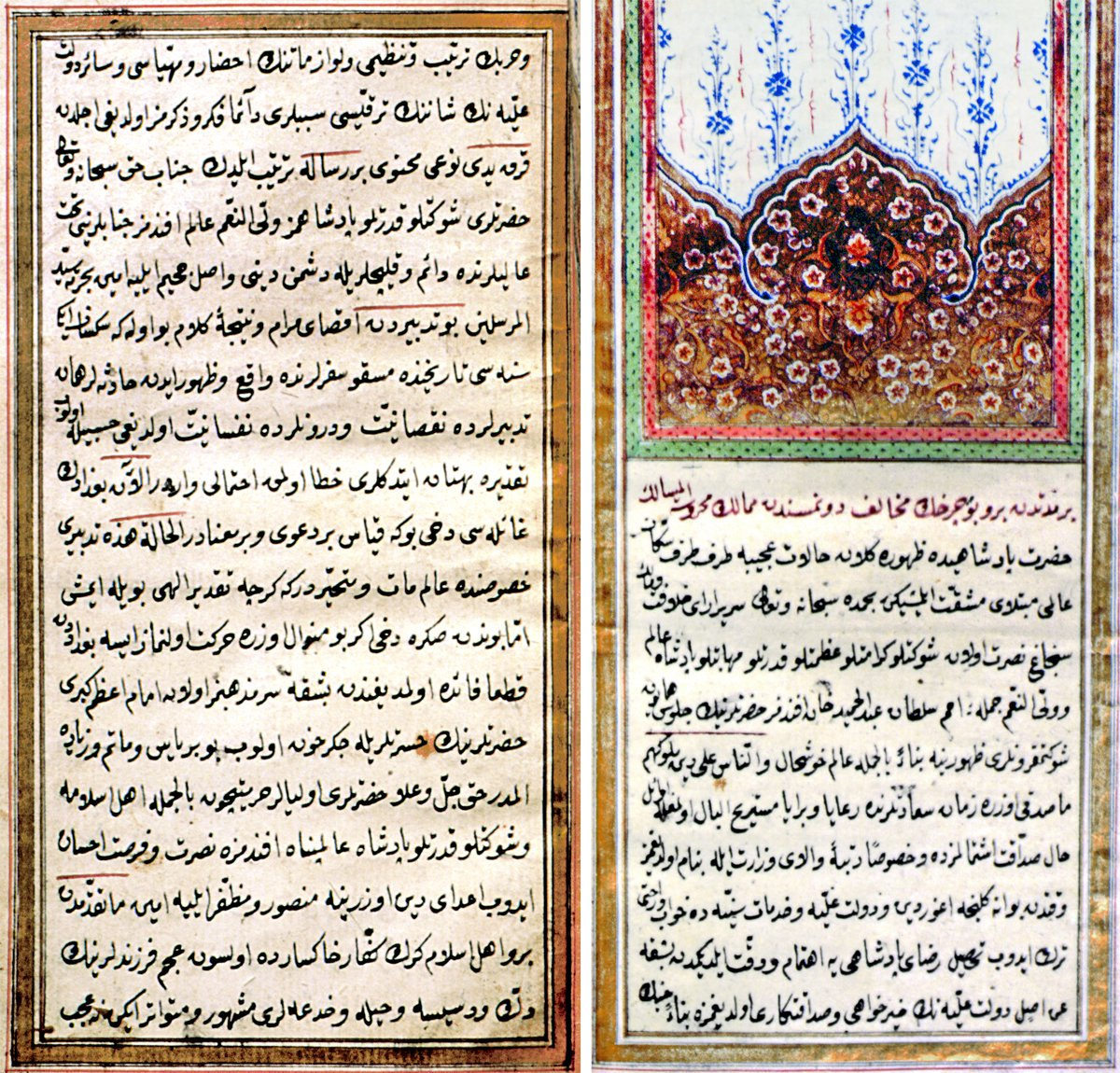
First pages of Canikli Hacı Pasha's treatise Tedâbîrü'l-gazavât

The Canikli family or Canikli dynasty was a prominent Ottoman family. The family had a notable feud with the Çapanoğlu, with whom they clashed for supremacy in Anatolia.

The family was founded in Istanbul by Canikli Haci Ali Pasha, born in c. 1720. Haci was the son of Fatsalı Ahmed Ağa, a kapıcıbaşı. Because of atrocities his father committed in Terme and Fatsa, Haci was exiled in Ankara after spending his childhood in the capital Istanbul. He fought in the suppression of the uprising in Georgia in 1762, conquering some castles in the conflict. He thus gained the approval of the Sublime Porte. He was then involved in a dispute with his brother, Süleyman Pasha.

Haci then participated in the Russo-Turkish War (1768–1774). He fought the bandits in Amasya and Samsun, clearing those lands of them. He dealt with his opponents, defeated them, and gained the Amasya sanjak. Indeed, in the 1770s the family gained control of Amasya and Sivas. His eldest son, Battal Hüseyin Bey, became voivode of Şebinkarahisar and kapıcıbaşı, while his youngest son Mikdad Ahmed Bey became governor of Sivas. In the same year Süleyman Pasha's son (and Haci Ali's nephew) Mehmed Bey gained the Çorum sanjak.

Haci Ali Pasha then failed in the Crimean war, displeasing the sultan. This, added to the war crimes he committed in Crimea and the ongoing feud with the Çapanoğlu family caused the Sublime Porte to turn its back on him.

However, the family still held considerable power and its members made important gains and were warded important posts. Among other things, in 1786, Battal Hüseyin Bey was given the Aleppo Eyalet and governorship in turbulent Syria.

Their failures in the Russo-Turkish War (1787–1792) caused the family to lose prominence.

In 1805, Selim III entrusted the Amasya sanjak to Süleyman Bey Capanoğlu, and later that year he gave the governorship of Sivas, as vizier, to Süleyman's son Mehmed Celaleddin Pasha. This post had been desired by Tayyar Mahmud Pasha, the grandson of Canikli Haci Ali Pasha, who had not been able to obtain it. When it was given to the scion of the rival family, Tayyar Mahmud Pasha became infuriated, and started recruiting soldiers to go to war against the Çapanoğlu. Only an intervention by the sultan avoided an armed conflict at this stage. The sultan stripped the Çapanoğlu of the Amasya sanjak, with Süleyman Bey Çapanoğlu respecting the sultan's decision. Tayyar Mahmud Pasha, however, was not satisfied. He declared that he would abolish the îrâd-ı cedî ("new revenue" coming from previously untaxed subjects, which was supporting the army). He occupied Amasya in June 1805. He then seized Tokat and Zile, which had come into the domain of the Çapanoğlu. The Capanoğlu then decided to take action, and the Porte declared Tayyar Mahmud Pasha fermanlı ("outlawed"). Defeated, Tayyar fled to Crimea. In the end, Süleyman Bey also regained the Amasya sanjak.

In February 1781, however, the sultan, who wanted to check the increasing power of the rival family, pardoned the Canikli. Hacı Ali Pasha became vizier of the province Erzurum (Erzurum Eyalet), and his son Mikad was named governor. The family was returned their old lands, and Mehmed also became the sanjak of Amasya. Thus the feud reopened. This time, however, it was kept secret. Hacı Ali got some of his rival's slaves, and had the head of the rival family, Capanoğlu Mustafa Bey, killed by them in the spring of 1782.

Haci Ali Pasha is described as a prudent, intellectual tyrant by Turkish sources. He wrote a treatise, the Tedâbîrü'l-gazavât, which he started after he returned from Crimea in 1774 and finished on 25 November 1776. The work criticizes the institutions in Mustafa I's time, and advocates improvement of the land ownership system and military order. The manuscript was later published by Yücel Özkaya.

Haci's grandsons Tayyar Mahmud and Hayreddin Ragib were both poets.

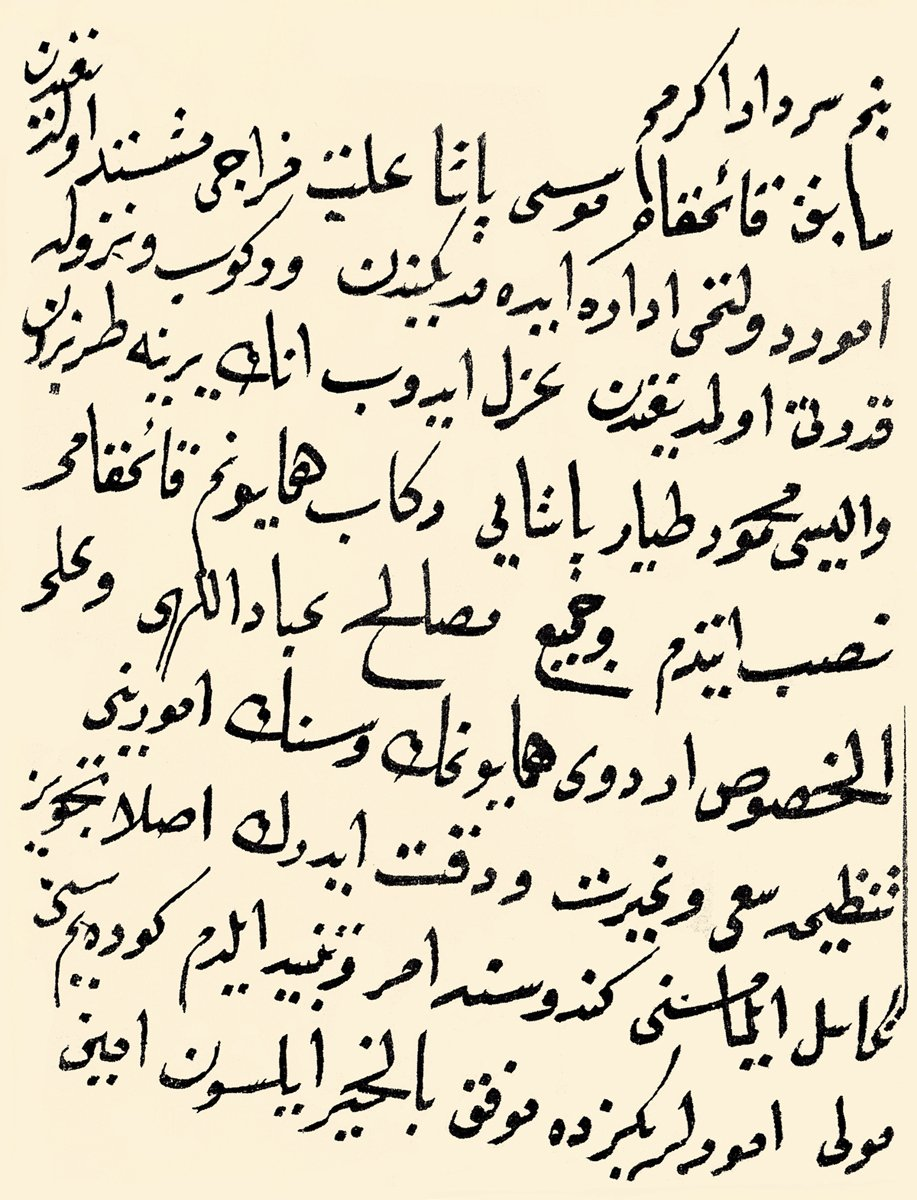
Letter regarding the appointment of Tayyar Mahmud Pasha as district governor of rikâb-ı Hümâyun

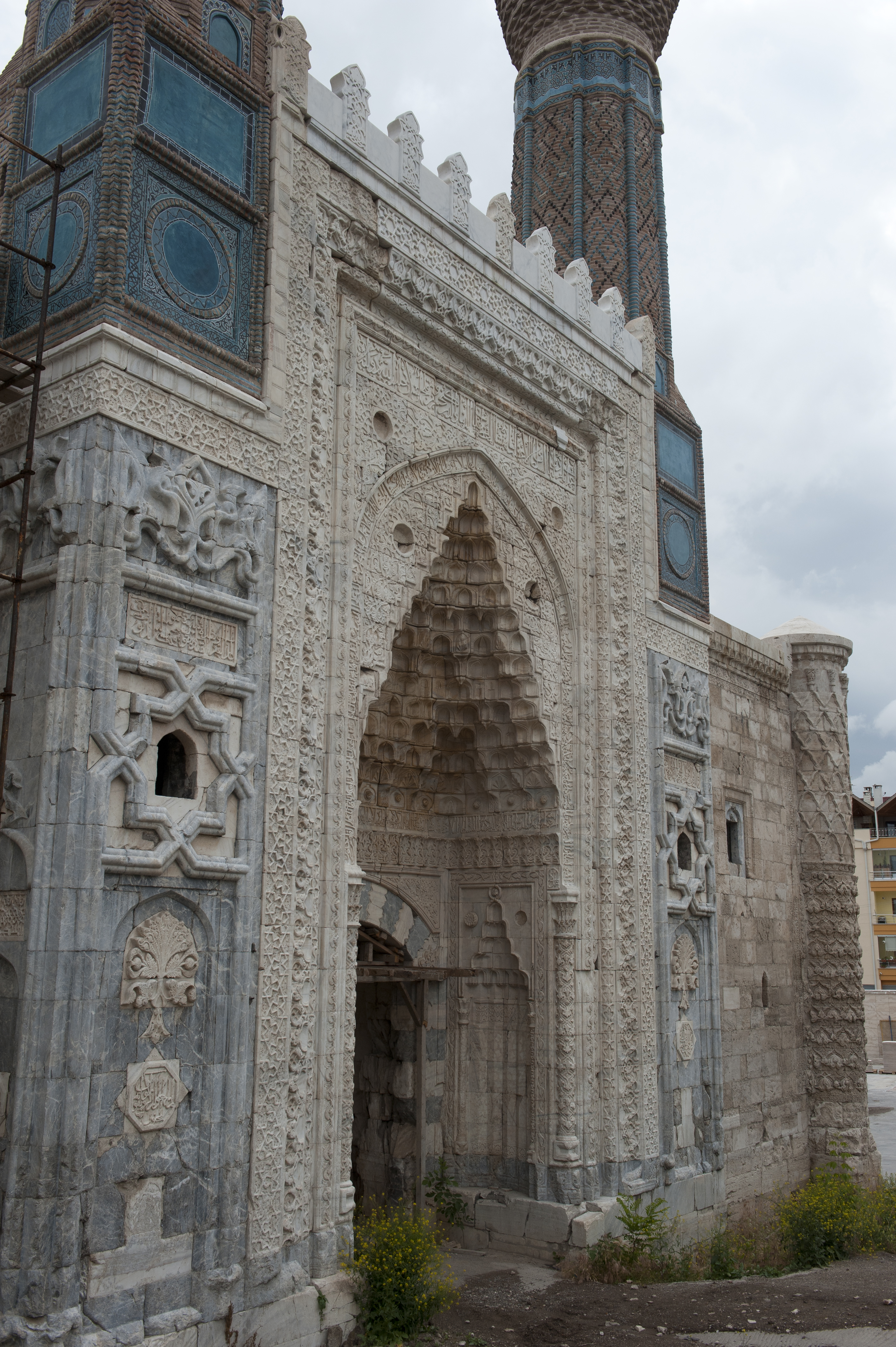
Sivas was disputed between the Canikli and the Çapanoğlu

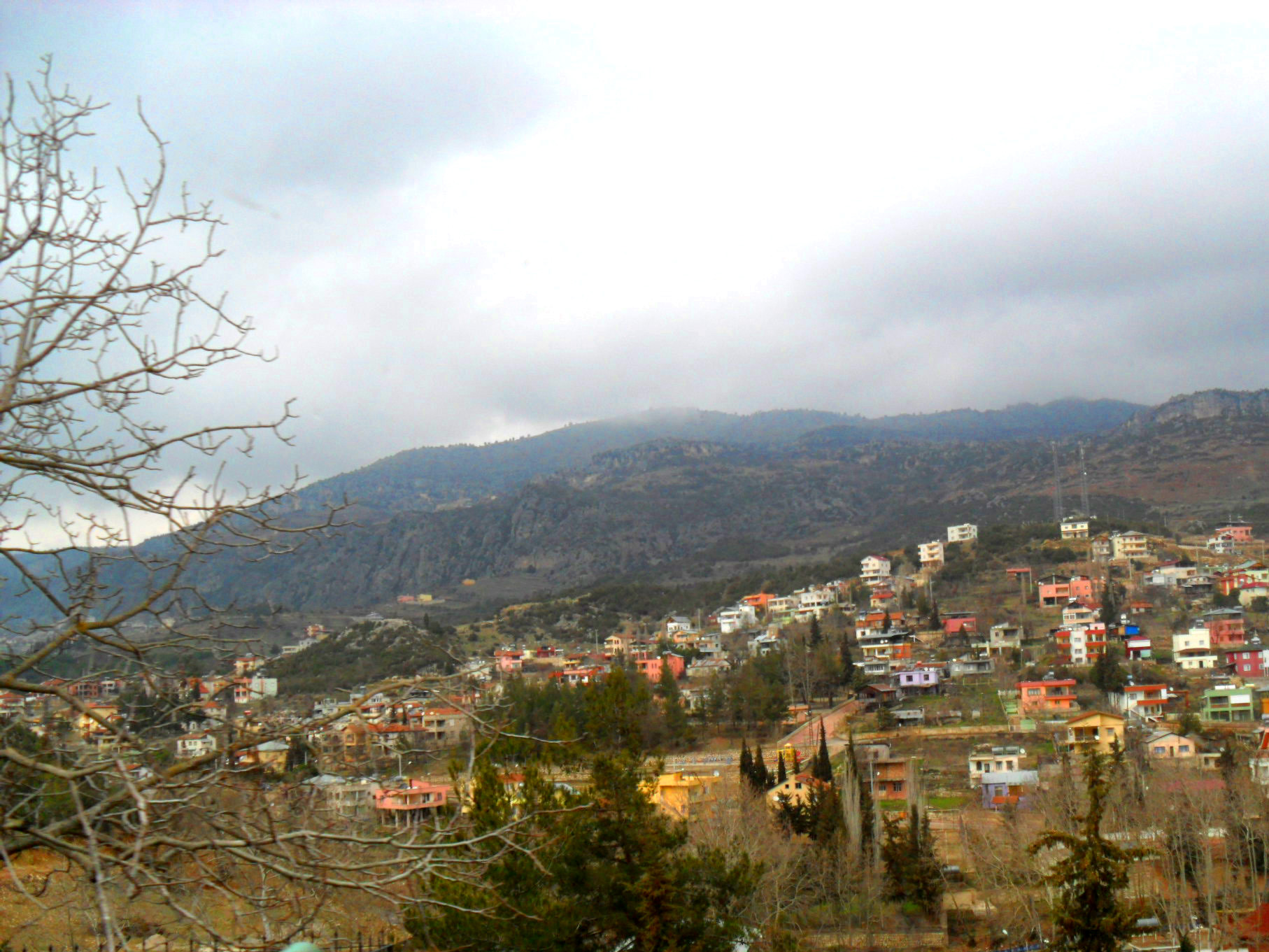
Hacı Ali carried out works of construction in Soğucak
