= Çapanoğlu Mosque =

Mosque in Yozgat, Turkey

Çapanoglu Mosque
- Çapanoğlu Camii
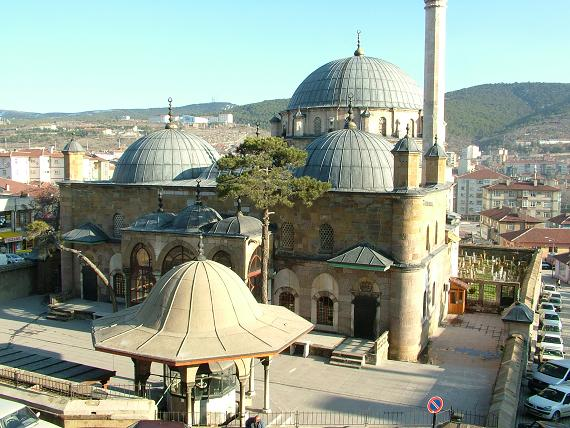

- Location within Turkey

Religion
- Affiliation: Islam
- Branch/tradition: Sunni

Location
- Location: Yozgat, Yozgat Province, Turkey
- Interactive map of Çapanoglu Mosque
- Coordinates: 39.82181°N 34.80564°E

Architecture
- Type: Mosque
- Established: 1779

The Çapanoglu Mosque (Turkish: Çapanoğlu Camii) is a mosque in the city of Yozgat, Turkey.

Influenced by European architectural styles, the mosque was constructed in two parts, by members of the Çapanoglu family: the first part was constructed by Çapanoğlu Mustafa Ahmed Pasha in 1779, and the second in 1794/95 by his brother Süleyman.
