= Sanjak of Kütahya =

The Sanjak of Kütahya was a second-level province (sanjak) of the Ottoman Empire.

Kütahya was the capital of the Anatolian beylik of Germiyan, and became part of the Ottoman state in 1381 through the marriage of the future Sultan Bayezid I with Devlet Hatun, the daughter of the Germiyanid ruler. Initially known as the Sanjak of Germiyan, it became part of the Anatolia Eyalet from its formation in the late 14th century, and in the late 15th century became the capital of the eyalet until its dissolution ca. 1841, when it became part of Hüdavendigâr Eyalet.

In the 16th-century the Sanjak of Kütahya was comprised by the kazas of Kütahya, Eğrigöz-Simav, Güre-Selendi, Homa-Geyikler, Honaz, Kula, Lazkiye, Şeyhlü and Uşak.

In 1912 it comprised the districts (kazas) of Kütahya proper, Eskişehir, Uşak, Kedus and Simav.

== Sources ==
- Birken, Andreas [in German] (1976). Die Provinzen des Osmanischen Reiches [The Provinces of the Ottoman Empire]. Beihefte zum Tübinger Atlas des Vorderen Orients, 13 (in German). Reichert. ISBN 3-920153-56-1.
