= Kastamonu Eyalet =

Administrative division of the Ottoman Empire from 1827 to 1864

ایالت قسطمونی Eyālet-i Qasṭamōnī
- Eyalet of the Ottoman Empire
- 1827–1864
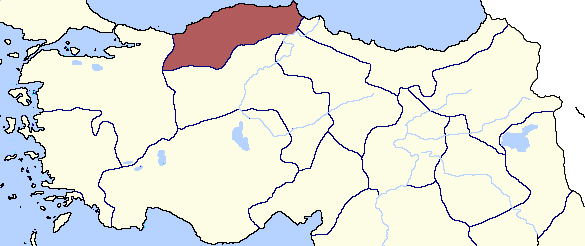
- The Kastamonu Eyalet in 1861
- Capital: Kastamonu
- History
  - Established: 1827
  - Disestablished: 1864
Preceded by	Succeeded by
Anatolia Eyalet	Kastamonu Vilayet
- Today part of: Turkey

Kastamonu Eyalet (Ottoman Turkish: ایالت قسطمونی, romanized: Eyālet-i Qasṭamōnī) was an eyalet of the Ottoman Empire.

== Administrative divisions ==
Sanjaks of the Eyalet in the mid-19th century:

1. Sanjak of Kocaeli (Bithynia)
2. Sanjak of Bolu (Paphlagonia)
3. Sanjak of Virantsehir (Honorias) (near Eskipazar?)
4. Sanjak of Sinope (Helenopontus)
