= Charter of Alliance =

1808 Ottoman Empire treaty

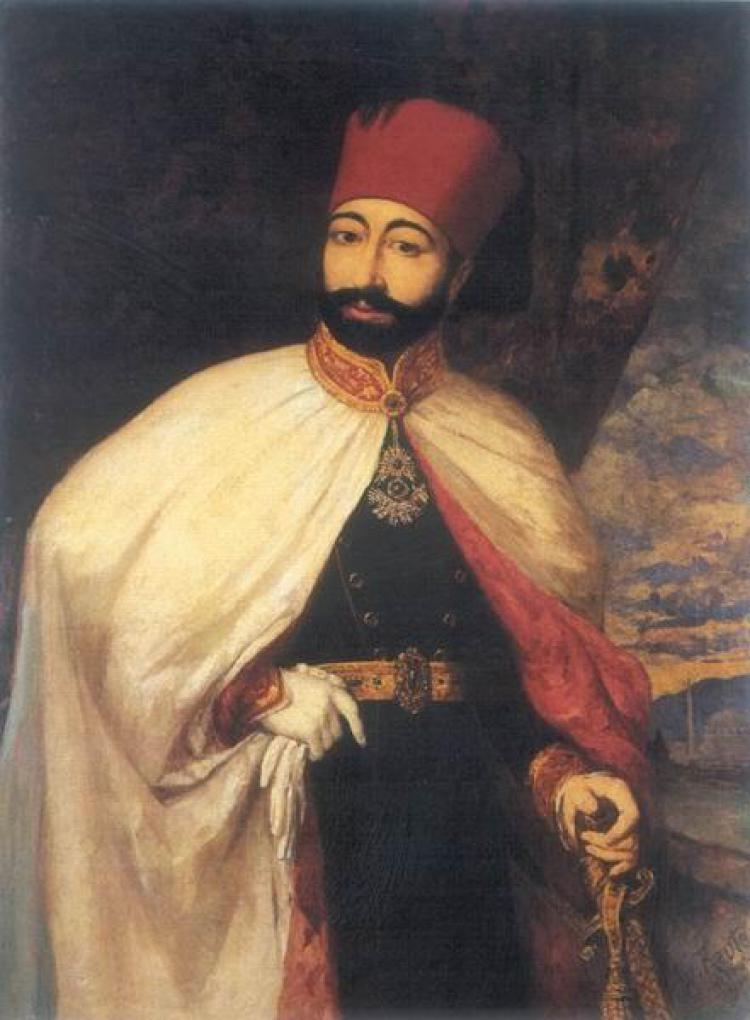
Mahmut II

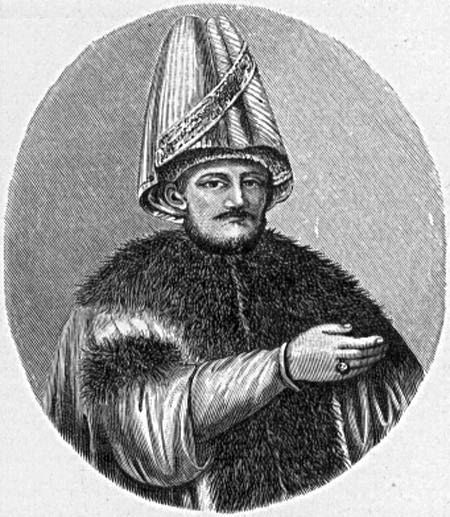
Alemdar Mustafa Pasha

The Charter of Alliance (Ottoman Turkish: سند إتّفاق, Turkish: Sened-i İttifak) also known as Deed of Agreement was a treaty between the grand vizier of the Ottoman Empire and a number of powerful local rulers signed in 1808, in an attempt to regulate their power and relations with the central Ottoman government.

== Background ==
In the Ottoman Empire, agricultural land was considered to be the sultan's private estate. These estates (Turkish: dirlik) were granted to cavalrymen (Turkish: tımarlı sipahi, "timariot sipahis") in return for their military services during war. The system was similar to the fief system of Medieval Europe, except that the land was non-inheritable, precluding the rise of feudalism in the Ottoman Empire. However, during the Empire's decline in the 18th century, two factors provoked a kind of feudalism:

- The advance in military technology, which rendered the Ottoman cavalry far less effective.
- Loss of profitable land and almost continuous wars forced the Ottoman Porte to collect more tax and to appoint tax collectors to provinces.

The cavalrymen were replaced by the tax collectors and local military rulers who were called derebeys ("river lords") or ayan. These powerful local leaders formed de facto local dynasties supported by considerable military power. By the end of the 18th century, the authority of the sultan had become almost non-existent outside the capital Istanbul, and the empire had become highly decentralized.

== Alemdar Mustafa's rise to Grand Vizier ==
Alemdar Mustafa Pasha an ayan in Rusçuk (Ruse, Bulgaria) was supporting the reformist Sultan Selim III (reigned 1789–1807). After Selim III was dethroned, Alemdar marched to Istanbul to reenthrone Selim III. However Selim had been killed by the new Sultan Mustafa IV (reigned 1807-1808). Alemdar dethroned Mustafa IV and enthroned his brother Mahmut II (reigned 1808–1839). To show gratitude, Mahmut II appointed Alemdar as his grand vizier.

== The Charter of Alliance ==
The number of notables who participated in the negotiations is not known. However, the sources mention Çapanoğlu Süleyman Bey from Bozok (Yozgat), Karaosmanoğlu Ömer Ağa from Manisa, İsmâil Bey from Siroz, Ahmed Ağa from Şile, Bolu Voivode Hacıahmedoğlu Seyyid İbrâhim Ağa, Bilecik notable Kalyoncu Mustafa Bey and Çirmen governor.

Originally one of the ayans himself, Alemdar tried to end the chaos in the empire by a treaty. He invited other ayans to Istanbul. Although only four of them showed up, Alemdar and they signed a document called the "Charter of Alliance" (Turkish: Sened’i İttifak) on 29 September 1808. The terms were

1. The ayans promised to show respect to the Sultan.
2. The ayans agreed to assign their military units in the Sultan's army.
3. The ayans promised to help to protect the Sultan's treasury.
4. The ayans promised to obey the orders given by the Grand Vizier under the condition that the orders were not illegal. The ayans also agreed not to interfere in other ayans' sphere of influence.
5. The Sublime Porte legitimised the ayans and their estates. Furthermore, the estates were declared inheritable.
6. The ayans promised to support the Sultan against revolts.
7. The Grand Vizier promised to consult with the ayans to solve taxation problems, while ayans promised not to oppress the poor.

== Comparison with Magna Carta ==
According to some historians, the Charter of Alliance was a form of Turkish Magna Carta. Others, however; point out that the Charter, signed in the first half of the 19th century, can't be compared to Magna Carta of the 13th century. Overall Magna Carta was a more detailed and developed document geared toward resolving certain power conflicts, especially its first clause guaranteeing the liberty of the English church, and others involving taxation. The similarities, according to Sina Akşin, are mainly in the clauses about taxation and the spiritual power. Akşin notes some significant differences in Magna Carta like trial by jury not found in the Sened-i İttifak.

== Aftermath ==
In any case, the Charter was short-lived. According to the treaty, Alemdar's successors would also sign the treaty. But after Alemdar's death no Grand Vizier ratified the treaty, probably due to the sultan's only half-hearted support to it. The Sultan saw this treaty as a challenge to his prestige. In the following years however the energetic Sultan fought against the ayans and was able to subdue most of them.

== See also ==
- Chiflik
- Constitutional process in Turkey
