= Karaosmanoğlu family =

Turkish family

The Karaosmanoğlu Dynasty
- Country: Ottoman Empire; Turkey
- Founded: 17th Century

The Karaosmanoğlu Dynasty is a family that were derebey or ayans, part of the land owning elite in the peripheral provinces, during the Ottoman Empire. After the empire fell, its members have continued to have an impact in Turkey and abroad.

== History ==
The family descends from the sipahi (cavalryman) Kara Osman Ağa (born in 1666), considered of Turkic origin, from village of Yaya (Zeytinliova) in the district of Manisa. Mehmed Çavuş (died in 1644), his father, was a kapıcıbaşı also from Zeytinliova (at the time Yaya).

A legend abound the founding of the dynasty states that a peasant was tilling his land when he unearthed six vases. Inside each of the vases was a large amount of treasure. He reported the find to the local authorities and was told that it was his duty to give five of the vases to the Sultan but he could keep the sixth. The peasant, in a show of fealty, sent all six vases to the Sultan. When the Sultan learned of the peasant’s sacrifice, he proclaimed that the peasant and his family shall rule the region of Manisa as a reward for his devotion.

What most likely happened was that a military leader was given control of the region due to the influence he wielded. However, the story is divided on whether the military commander was a member of an ayan’s army that took over the region to secure it for his family or if he was bandit warlord that was placated with the gift of land. While these stories do not emphasize the devotion to a central imperial authority as the first story, it did show the power of the ayans in relation to the Sultan. The Sultan depended on the ayans to collect the taxes and provide armed forces from their provinces until the rule of Sultan Mahmud II where he began to centralize the government. These versions of the founding shows the weakness of the central government that could not defend a rich province from an internal threat and decided to placate the threat in a bid to rule over it.

Before Mahmud II implemented his reforms, the Karaosmanoğlus wielded considerable influence. During Russo-Turkish War (1787-1792), the family actively supported the war effort, catching the attention of the Sultan. As a reward, they received various positions, significantly boosting their economic strength. Members of the family assumed roles such as asmutesellim of Aydın, muhafız (commander) of Izmir, mubayaacı (agent for wholesale grain purchase) of the quay of İzmir, or voyvoda of Turgutlu, Menemen, and Bergama. Through strategic appointments in key offices with trade-regulating capabilities, the Karaosmanoğlus emerged as one of Anatolia's most influential families. However, their power waned during Mahmud II's era of centralization.

== Members ==
=== Yakup Kadri Karaosmanoğlu ===
Yakup Kadri Karaosmanoğlu (March 27, 1889—Dec. 13, 1974) was one of the primary literary and political voices in the foundation of Turkey. He was part of the leftist political philosophy called the Kadro movement, which in turn as influential on Kemalism. Yakup Kadri inserted political messages in his writings that would help justify the Turkish cultural and political revolution. One example is in his novel Nur Baba (1922). In it, Nur Baba infiltrates the religious orders and uses his power to exploit the populace (especially the women) for his own gain. Yakup Kadri is arguing that in order to stop this exploitation the Turkish people must move past their dependence on religion in the official sphere and modernize. This was realized with a separation of religion and state with the formation of the Presidency of Religious Affairs. Yakup Kadri actively shaped the fledgling government of Turkey by becoming a senator and then a diplomat from 1934-1954. He retired from the political life to write books that continued to spread his leftist message.

=== Atilla Karaosmanoğlu ===
Atilla Karaosmanoğlu (1931-November 11, 2013) was a Turkish economist and politician. He was a member of the World Bank where he worked from 1966 to 1994, taking a two year leave of absence to become the Turkish deputy prime minister in charge of economic policy. This short absence from the World Bank was due to the Prime Minister at the time, Nihat Erim, rejecting the economic plans put forth by Attila and ten others. As a sign of protest all eleven resigned at the same time. Shortly after coming back to the World Bank Atilla was named chief economist for the Europe, Middle East and North Africa region. He was the World Bank Vice President for the East Asia and Pacific region from 1983 to 1987, and then Vice President of the Asia region until 1991. He then became managing director. He retired in 1994 to Istanbul.
