= Çapanoğlu Uprising =

- Part of Turkish War of Independence Internal Front
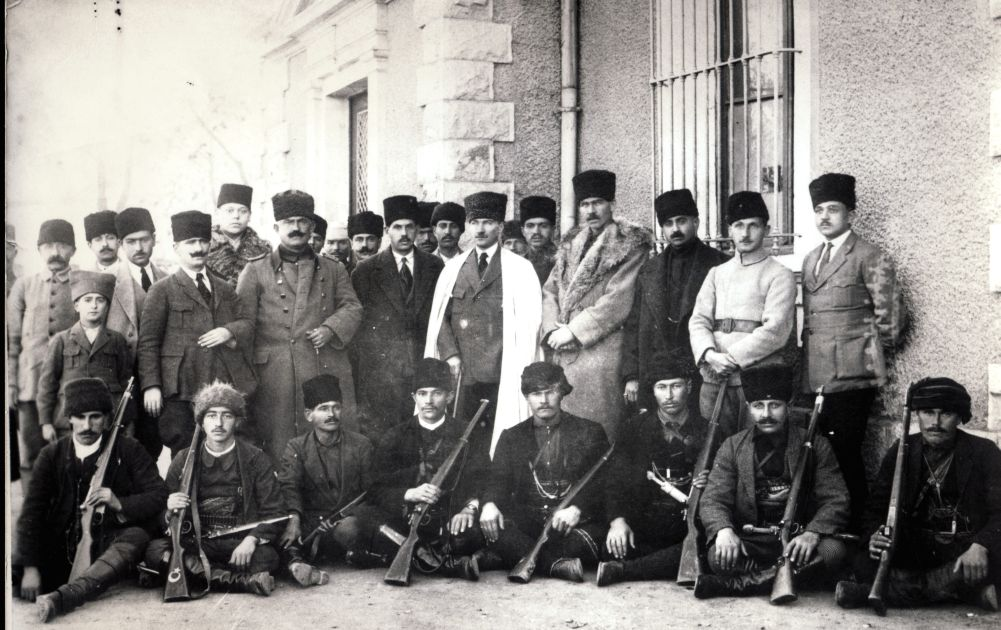
- Ethem Dipsheu and his men together with Mustafa Kemal Atatürk in front of the headquarters in the Station, June 1920
Date	1st clash: 15 May 1920 – 27 August 1920; 2nd clash: 5 September 1920 – 30 December 1920
Location	Yozgat, Ottoman Empire
Result	Uprising suppressed

Belligerents
(Ottoman Empire) Turkish National Movement	(Ottoman Empire) Çapanoğlu family

Strength
Unknown	Unknown

Casualties and losses
Unknown	Unknown; 12 people hanged after the battle 23 Circassian villagers executed by firing squad

The Çapanoğlu Uprising or Yozgat Rebellion took place in Yozgat during the Turkish War of Independence and was led by Çapanoğlu Edip Bey and his brother Celal Bey. The uprising happened in two phases, the First Yozgat Uprising (15 May - 27 August 1920), which the government mistakenly declared suppressed, and the Second Yozgat Uprising (5 September - 30 December 1920).

The first uprising was started in Yıldızeli under the leadership of Erzurumlu Hüseyin Nazım and Kara Mustafa. The uprising was suppressed by Kuva-yi Seyyare under the command of Ethem Dipsheu, but like other internal rebellions, it weakened the Turkish War of Independence movement and facilitated the work of the occupation forces. By accelerating the advance of the main danger, namely the Greek army, it paved the way for the Greek occupation of Balıkesir and Bursa. When he returned to Ankara from Yozgat, Ethem, who was welcomed by the Assembly as a savior, increased his power even more, separated from Ankara and finally the process leading to the liquidation of Ethem began.

== Overview ==
The Çapanoğlu, founded in the 17th century, had become one of the most powerful dynasties in the empire in the 18th century. However, their influence decreased with the War of Independence. On 7 June 1920 Chief of the General Staff Miralay İsmet Bey ordered Miralay Selâhaddin Bey to arrest the Çapanoğlu brothers in Sivas. Edip Bey was once a supporter of the Committee of Union and Progress and the MP. He eventually became an opponent, to the point that he was expelled from the CUP. He wasn't even allowed to go back to his position as governor and was sent back to his hometown. He then joined the Liberal Entente. The first and main conflict took place between 15 May 1920 and 27 August 1920, while there was a second clash that occurred between 5 September 1920 and 30 December 1920.

There were initially some incidents in the region, but the Çapanoğlu refrained from participating. Eventually, however, Celal and Salih Çapanoğlu decided to oppose the nationalists. Among the issues was their disagreement on money collection for the nationalists. Ankara was informed by the Yozgat mufti, and sent Ali Kılıç to seize control of the region, check fundraising and surveil the family, which disturbed the letter very much. On 8 June 1920 they left the city and started organizing the anti-nationalists. On 14 June they returned to the city to start the uprising. They started by releasing the prisoners from the jail. Meanwhile, Çapanoğlu Mehmet Aga was set to fight Ankara by the sultan with a 1500-men force. The family managed to seize control of Yozgat. The Circassian Çerkez Ethem Bey was then sent to suppress the uprising. On 20 June he moved from Ankara and on 23 he was in Yozgat. He took the city the same day. Some of the leaders managed to leave, went to territories settled by Circassians, and were sheltered by them.

The Çapanoğlu and their forces were defeated by the government of the Grand National Assembly. Çerkez Ethem Bey established a military court and executed twelve rebels, including the Qadi of the town. Among the executed were Çapanoğlu Mahmud Bey and Vâsıf Bey. Ethem also executed four of his own men, because they engaged in looting. Halid Bey Çapanoğlu, who was captured later, was sentenced to death and hanged. Yusuf Ziya Bey Çapanoğlu managed to flee to Syria. Edib and Celâl were pardoned and exiled to Istanbul. Salih Bey, another Çapanoğlu brother, did not participate in the uprising and thus was not persecuted. Once the uprising was suppressed, Ethem proceeded with destroying the mansion of the Çapanoğlu and set fire to their family houses and farms. Next, on 24 June he went to Alaca and from thence to Altıntaş, a village of Circassians, to punish them, executing 23 people by firing squad.
