= Sanjak of Ankara =

The Sanjak of Ankara was a second-level province (sanjak) of the Ottoman Empire.

The town of Ankara became part of the Ottoman state in 1361 or perhaps in 1354. It was the first capital (pasha sanjak) of the Anatolia Eyalet from its formation in the late 14th century until the late 15th century, when it was moved to Kütahya. The sanjak of Ankara remained part of Anatolia Eyalet until the latter's dissolution ca. 1841–46, when it became the seat of the new Ankara Eyalet. This was merged into the Bozok Eyalet in 1849, but Ankara remained the capital, and after 1852 the province was once more known as the Ankara Eyalet, and after 1867 as the Ankara Vilayet.

In the 16th-century, the Sanjak of Ankara comprised the kazas of Ankara, Ayaş, Bacı, Çubuk, Murtazabad and Yabanabad.

In 1912, the sanjak of Ankara comprised the districts (kazas) of Ankara proper, Ayaş, Beypazarı, Nallıhan, Mihalıççık, Sivrihisar, Haymana, Bala, Yabanabad and Kalecik.

== Sources ==
- Birken, Andreas [in German] (1976). Die Provinzen des Osmanischen Reiches [The Provinces of the Ottoman Empire]. Beihefte zum Tübinger Atlas des Vorderen Orients, 13 (in German). Reichert. ISBN 3-920153-56-1.
