= Hüdavendigâr Eyalet =

Administrative division of the Ottoman Empire from 1827 to 1867

ایالت خداوندگار Eyālet-i Ḥüdāvendigār
- Eyalet of the Ottoman Empire
- 1827–1867
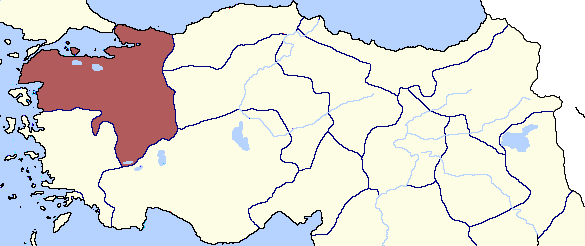
- The Hüdavendigâr Eyalet in 1861
- Capital: Bursa
- Area
  - Coordinates: 40°11′N 29°03′E
- History
  - Established: 1827
  - Disestablished: 1867
| Preceded by | Succeeded by |
| Anatolia Eyalet | Hüdavendigâr Vilayet |
- Today part of: Turkey

Hüdavendigâr Eyalet (Ottoman Turkish: ایالت خداوندگار, romanized: Eyālet-i Ḥüdāvendigār) was an eyalet of the Ottoman Empire. The word Hüdavendigâr comes from the Persian word Khodāvandgār which literally translates to "devotee of god".

== Administrative divisions ==
The eyalet was subdivided into 8 sanjaks:

1. Sanjak of Hüdavendigâr (Bursa)
2. Sanjak of Karahisar-i Sahip
3. Sanjak of Kütahya
4. Sanjak of Bilecik
5. Sanjak of Biga
6. Sanjak of Karesi
7. Sanjak of Erdek
8. Sanjak of Ayvalık
