= Münir Süleyman Çapanoğlu =

Turkish journalist (1894–1973)

- Born: 1894; Fatih Beyazıt, Ottoman Empire
- Died: 7 January 1973 (aged 78–79); Istanbul, Turkey
- Occupations: Historian, journalist, writer
- Family: Çapanoğlu family

Münir Süleyman Çapanoğlu (1894 – 1 July 1973) was a Turkish journalist, writer and press historian. He is known for his books Basın Tarihimizde (İlâve) and Basın Tarihimizde Mizah Dergileri. He made important contributions to the history of Turkish press.

He was born in Fatih Beyazıt in 1894, into the Çapanoğlu family. His father was Süleyman Bey and his mother was Zekiye Hanım, and he was also the granddaughter of Agâh Çapanoğlu, who had a place in the history of the Turkish press. He had his first education in Beyazıt Mosque, and later learned French. He continued his studies in Şemsül Maarif and Numunei Terakki. He made friends with Mahmut Yesari during his student years. After his education at Lycée Saint-Joseph, Istanbul, he enrolled in the literature department of Istanbul University, but was drafted into the military because the First World War broke out. He started his career in journalism influenced by the Turkish writer Ahmet Rasim. He gained experience by going frequently to Mihran Nakkaşyan's (1850-1944) Sabah. He continued his career, which he started with the newspaper İkdam after the Second Constitutional Monarchy, by working in many of the Istanbul newspapers of the period. He worked for Alemdar newspaper for the longest time. He was blind for the last 10 years of his life. Due to the risks of the treatment process, no surgical intervention was performed. He had some of his articles dictated to his friends. After his death, Sabih İzzet Alaçam wrote a poem entitled "Münir Süleyman". He wrote about Said Nursî.
