= Capanoğlu Süleyman Bey =

18th-century Ottoman military leader

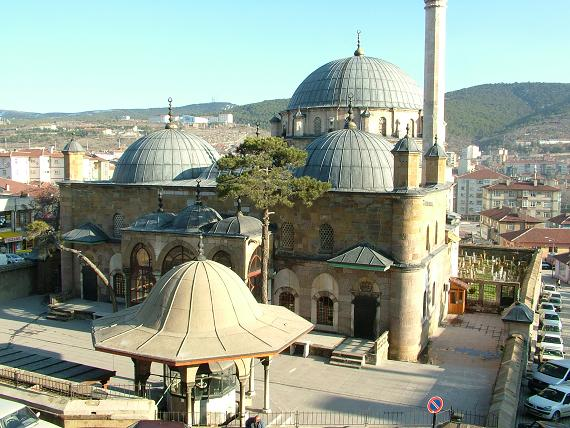
The Çapanoğlu Mosque was expanded by Süleyman

Süleyman Bey or Çapanoğlu Süleyman Bey was an Ottoman military leader and office holder from the Turkish Çapanoğlu family, one of the most powerful Ottoman dynasties of the 18th century. Under his guidance the family reached its peak of prominence.

As a member of the family, he was involved in their Feud with the Canikli, which he handled well. He helped Constantinople by providing food and soldiers from the family army, and in 1790 led 4000 soldiers to the front. He contributed to the development of his native Yozgat, expanding the family's mosque and building over 60 shops. He was among the prominent signatories of the Charter of Alliance.

== Biography ==
He was the son of Çapanoğlu Ahmed Pasha, himself the son the Turkmen Ömer Ağa (died 1704), son of Çapar Ömer Ağa, the founder of the dynasty.

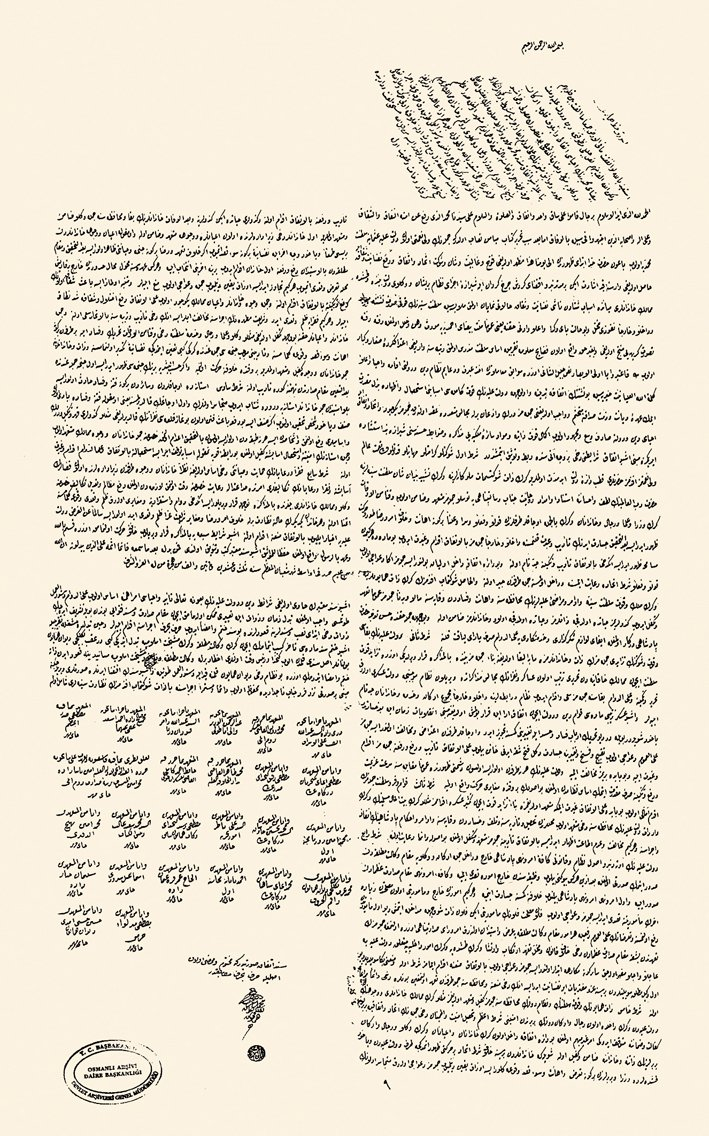
The Charter of Alliance signed by Süleyman

After the death of their father, he and his brother Mustafa inherited the family mansion. However, it was his brother Mustafa who was given the family's Bozok sanjak after their father's death. In 1773, his brother Mustafa became trustee of Kayseri sanjak. Meanwhile, Süleyman Bey was rewarded with the title of kapıcıbaşı for his services, just like Mustafa's son Ali Rıza Bey. With the death of Mustafa, Süleyman became governor of the sanjak. He was given permission by the sultan to expand the family's domains in southern Anatolia, thus displacing the powerful Küçük Alioğlu and Kozanoglu families. His smart and cautious approach with the Sublime Porte solidified his sway in Bozok and extended the influence of the family to Ankara, Aleppo, Çankırı, Çorum, Amasya, Şarkikarahisar, Sivas, Kayseri, Kırşehir, Nevşehir, Konya Ereğli, Niğde, Tarsus, Adana, Rakka, Gaziantep, and Maraş.

In 1786 he sent 1000 soldiers to suppress the turmoil in Egypt. He became governor of Çankırı sanjak in 1787 and of the Sanjak of Ankara next year. He assisted the sultan by providing grain and soldiers for the Russo-Turkish War of 1787–1792, and went to the Rumelian front with 4000 soldiers in 1790, thus joining the expedition himself. The family headed their own troops to the front at the Danube in 1790. He was given the titles of great mirahur and hil'at in 1790, while his son Abdülfettah was named kapıcıbaşı. He maintained his dominance and in 1794 ensured that the Fertile and Bozkır mines were given to him and his close associates of Tarsus and Andana sanjaks. Some troubles with the Sublime Porte followed. However, he sent soldiers to help in the Pazvandoğlu revolt in Rumelia and the French campaign in Egypt and Syria, while suppressing uprisings in and around his region.

A supporter of the Nizam-i Cedid, Süleyman collected taxes for the treasury. He helped in the establishment of the new Anatolian army, providing soldiers and building barracks. Selim III gave him the Amasya sanjak, provided he established the Nizam-ı Cedid by 1805.

He participated to the meeting organized by Alemdar Mustafa Pasha in the Fall of 1808. There, he was among the notable signatories the Charter of Alliance.

Süleyman Bey held political, military, and economic power in the Anatolia and influence in the empire. He extended the influence of the family all the way to Syria. Süleyman Bey also expanded the family's Çapanoğlu Mosque in his native Yozgat, and built a school, a hamam (bathhouse) and his famous mansion, significantly contributing to the development of the city with about sixty shops and a hamam.
