= Kastamonu vilayet =

First-level administrative division of the Ottoman Empire

ولايت قسطمونى Vilâyet-i Kastamuni
- Vilayet of the Ottoman Empire
- 1867–1922
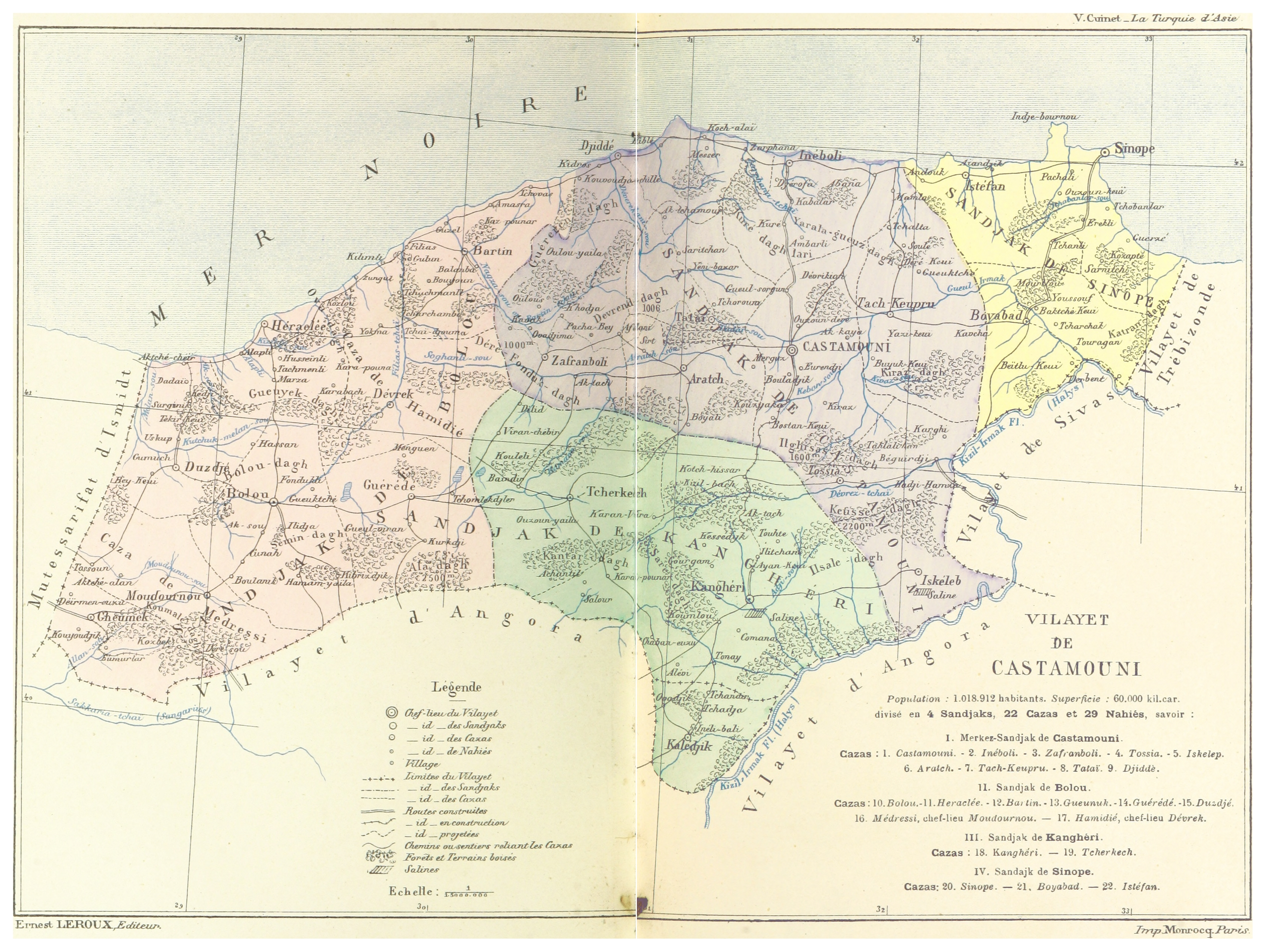
- The Kastamonu Vilayet in 1895
- Capital: Kastamonu
- History
  - Vilayet Law: 1867
  - Disestablished: 1922
| Preceded by | Succeeded by |
| Kastamonu Eyalet | Turkey |

The Vilayet of Kastamonu (Ottoman Turkish: ولايت قسطمونى, romanized: Vilâyet-i Kastamuni) was a first-level administrative division (vilayet) of the Ottoman Empire, established in 1867 and abolished in 1922. At the beginning of the 20th century, the vilayet reportedly had an area of 19,300 square miles (50,000 km^{2}), while the preliminary results of the first Ottoman census of 1885 (published in 1908) gave the population as 1,009,460. The accuracy of the population figures ranges from "approximate" to "merely conjectural" depending on the region from which they were gathered.

== History ==
The Kastamonu Vilayet, a first-level administrative division of the Ottoman Empire, was established in 1867 and abolished in 1922. In the 1920s, the British geographer George Walter Prothero described the region as being mountainous, indicating a rugged and varied terrain. This would have influenced the lifestyle and culture of the inhabitants, likely leading to communities that were isolated from each other due to the challenging landscape.

The population at that time was primarily Muslim. This religious majority would have shaped the social and cultural norms of the region, influencing aspects such as legal systems, education, and daily customs. It's important to note that while the population was primarily Muslim, it was likely diverse in terms of ethnicity, language, and cultural practices.

== Economy ==
The vilayet was not known for large agricultural production, despite being described as having fertile ground in 1920. Most agricultural production is kept within the vilayet, being consumed by the population. What was produced, included wheat, barley, maize, chickpeas, gall, and valonia oak. A small amount of opium and cotton was also produced in the region. Silk production was active in the southern area on a small scale, as was livestock. The area used to mine lead and nickel.

Cloth was also being produced in the Kastamonu Vilayet, made from wool and goat hair, which was mainly sold to locals. Sinop produced cotton cloth as well, with detailed embroidery. In the western part of the vilayet, rugs were produced. Sinop and Ineboli both were centers for boatbuilding.

== Administrative divisions ==
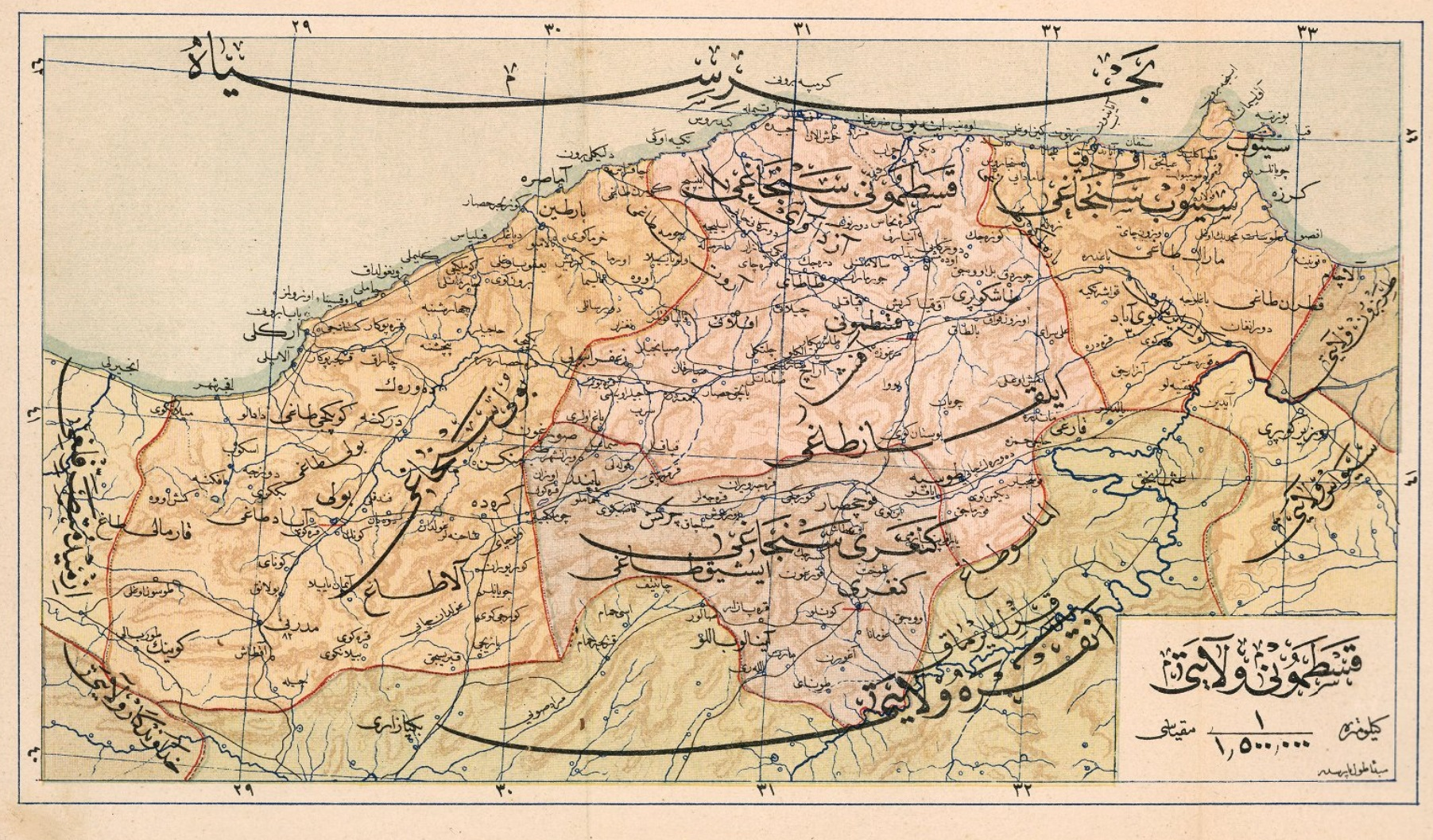
Map of subdivisions of Kastamonu Vilayet in 1907

Sanjaks of the Vilayet:

1. Sanjak of Kastamonu (Kastamonu, İnebolu, Safranbolu, Taşköprü, Daday, Cide, Tosya, Araç)
2. Sanjak of Kengiri (Çankırı, Çerkeş)
3. Sanjak of Sinob (Sinop, Boyabat, Ayancık)
- Sanjak of Bolu (Sanjak of Boli), now Bolu Province, was an independent sanjak within the borders of Kastamonu Vilayet. Localities within the sanjak: Bolu, Karadeniz Ereğli, Bartın, Gerede, Göynük, Akçakoca, Düzce, Devrek, Mudurnu.
