= Bolu Sanjak =

Sanjak of the Ottoman Empire

Bolu Sanjak Bolu Sancağı
- Sanjak of Ottoman Empire
- 1864–1922
- History
  - Established: 1864
  - Disestablished: 1922

Sanjak of Bolu (Turkish: Liva-i Bolu, Bolu Sancağı) was a sanjak of the Ottoman Empire. In the 1864 Ottoman Empire administrative reorganization, Bolu was created as an independent sanjak, administratively part of the Kastamonu Vilayet.

In the 16th-century, the Sanjak of Bolu comprised the kazas of Bolu, Çağa, Ereğlü, Gerede, Hızırbeyili (Çeharşenbe), Kıbrus, Konrapa, Mengen, Mudurnu, Onikidivan, Tarakluborlu (Borlu), Todurga, Ulus (Amasra), Viranşehir, Yedidivan (Pençşenbe) and Yenice.

== See also ==
- Bolu Province
