= Kapıcıbaşı =

Ottoman title

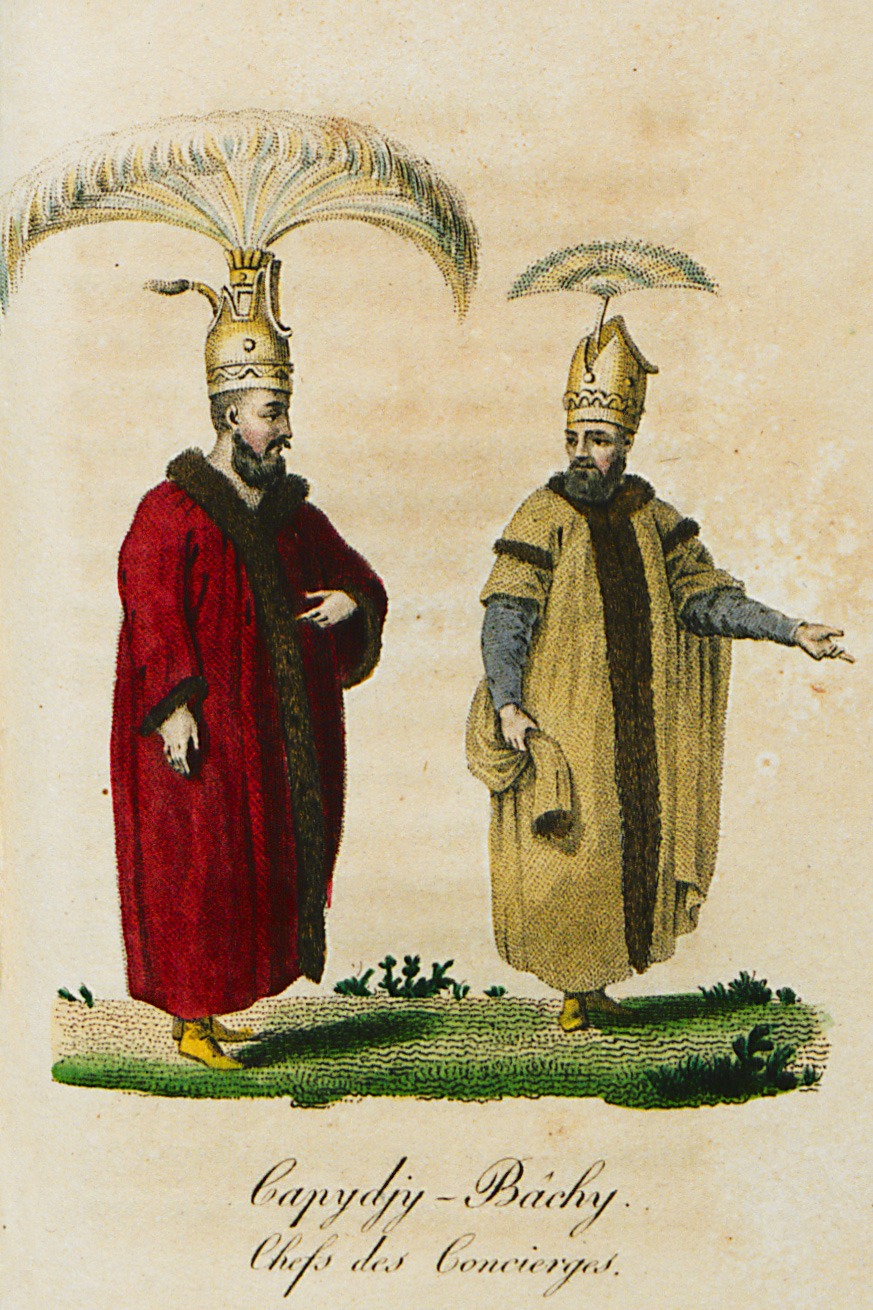
Two kapıcıbaşi depicted in Antoine-Laurent Castella 1812 work.

The Ottoman title of kapıcıbaşı designated the chief of the palace gatekeepers, or "chief warder". In the early phase of Ottoman statehood there was one single title-holder. It multiplied over time and there were in the 18th century some 150 simultaneous title-holders. The holder supervised the palace gatekeepers (kapıcılar), he was in charge of guarding the gates, transmitted messages and orders, and executed Imperial Council orders.

== Notable people ==
- Fatsali Ahmed Aga Canikli
- Abdulfettah Capanoglu
- Kara Musa Pasha
- Suleyman Bey Capanoglu
- Çoban Mustafa Pasha
- Battal Huseyin Bey Canikli
- Koca Mustafa Pasha
- Kurd Mehmed Pasha
- Izzet Ahmed Pasha
- Mustafa Capanoglu
- Topal Osman Pasha
- Piali Pasha
- Keki Abdi Pasha
