= Turkish Constitution of 1921 =

Fundamental law of post-Ottoman Turkey from 1921 to 1924

The Constitution of 1921 (Ottoman Turkish: تشکیلات اساسييه قانونى, romanized: Teşkilât-i Esasiyye Kanunu; Turkish: 1921 Anayasası) was the fundamental law of Turkey for a brief period from 1921 to 1924. The first constitution of the modern Turkish state, it was ratified by the Grand National Assembly of Turkey in January 1921. It was a simple document consisting of only 23 short articles. In October 1923 the constitution was amended to declare Turkey to be a republic. In April the following year the constitution was replaced by an entirely new document, the Constitution of 1924.

== Background ==
The draft of the Constitution, known as the Folkism Declaration (also Program of Folkism, Declaration of Folkism) was prepared by Mustafa Kemal Atatürk. The draft text consisted of 31 Articles declaring the construction of a new administrative organization. The declaration emphasized that sovereignty and power are in the hands of the Parliament and people of Turkey. The Declaration is considered one of the first programs and important texts of the Republican People's Party.

It was prepared by the Grand National Assembly that was elected both as a Constitutional Convention and as an acting Parliament on April 23, 1920, following the de facto collapse of the Ottoman Empire in the aftermath of the First World War. Mustafa Kemal Atatürk, who would later become the first president of the Republic of Turkey in 1923, was the major driving force behind the preparation of a Constitution that derived its sovereignty from the nation and not from the Sultan, the absolute monarch of the Ottoman Empire. The National Assembly convened with the purpose of writing a constitution that would prepare the grounds for the proclamation of a Republic and consecrate the principle of national sovereignty. This Constitution would also serve as the legal basis for the Turkish War of Independence during 1919–1923, since it would refute the principles of the Treaty of Sèvres of 1918 signed by the Ottoman Empire, by which a great majority of the Empire's territory would have to be ceded to the Entente powers that had won the First World War.

== Overview ==
The National Assembly commenced the debates for a new constitution on November 19, 1920, and it was ratified during the session of January 20, 1921. It was the first Turkish Constitution that consecrated the principle of national sovereignty.

It was a relatively short text consisting of twenty-three articles, the first nine articles laying out the principles upon which the state would be founded. It delegated the executive and legislative prerogatives to "the only true delegate of the sovereignty of the Nation", the National Assembly that was to be elected by direct popular vote. After the proclamation of the Republic on October 29, 1923, the executive powers were to be exercised by the President and the Council of Ministers on behalf of the National Assembly.

Because of the larger geopolitical conjecture of the time and the lack of a formal declaration of a republic, it failed to mention anything about the role the Sultan might play under this new constitution. From a technical point of view, it could be argued that it left open the possibility that the Sultanate might not be abolished and that it could have been amended to make way for a constitutional monarchy, similar to one founded by the French Constitution of 1791. In hindsight, however, it is clear that this omission was on purpose awaiting the outcome of the Independence War and the cessation of hostilities before the proclamation of the Republic.

It also didn't include any references to the judicial system for similar reasons, nor did it define the rights and responsibilities of citizens.

== Timeline ==
After having come into force on January 20, 1921, it stayed as the law of the land for three years until the adoption of the Constitution of 1924. During this time it witnessed many extremely important and fundamental events in the history of the Republic of Turkey:

- The Turkish War of Independence was won by the Turkish forces
- The Ottoman Sultanate and all aristocratic titles were abolished on November 1, 1922
- The Treaty of Lausanne that led to the international recognition of the new Republic was signed between Turkey and the Entente powers that had won the First World War on July 24, 1923
- The Republic was officially proclaimed on October 29, 1923, with Atatürk as its first President
- The title of the Caliphate that was held by the Ottoman Sultans since 1517 was abolished on March 3, 1924, along with all the remaining vestiges of Islamic Law. (Its powers within Turkey were transferred to the National Assembly and the title has since been inactive. Though very unlikely, the Republic of Turkey still retains the right to reinstate the Caliphate.)
- Per the law of March 3, 1924, the last Ottoman Sultan, the last Caliph and all members of their imperial families had their citizenships revoked, were exiled forever from the new Republic and their descendants banned from ever setting foot in its territory. The same law also nationalized all the properties of the Imperial Crown without compensation.

== Text (as enacted) ==
The text of the first nine articles may be translated as follows:

- Article 1: Sovereignty is vested in the nation without condition. The governmental system is based on the principle of self-determination and government by the people.
- Article 2: Executive power and legislative responsibility is exercised by and concentrated in the hands of the Grand National Assembly which is the sole and real representative of the nation.
- Article 3: The Turkish State is governed by the Grand National Assembly (Büyük Millet Meclisi) and its government is entitled 'the Government of Grand National Assembly' (Büyük Millet Meclisi Hükûmeti).
- Article 4: The Grand National Assembly is composed of members who are elected by the people of the provinces.
- Article 5: Elections to the Grand National Assembly are held every two years. The duration of membership is limited to two years but re-election of a member is possible. The former assembly remains in office until the new assembly convenes. When holding a new election seems to be impossible the legislative period can be extended by only one year. Each member of the Grand National Assembly is not only a representative of the province by which he is elected but of the whole nation.
- Article 6: The General Assembly of the Grand National Assembly convenes of its own accord on the first day of November.
- Article 7: The basic rights of the application of the ordinances of the sacred law; the promulgation, amendment, and abrogation of all laws; the concluding of treaties and peace; the promulgation of the defence of the fatherland (i.e., the declaration of war) belong to the Grand National Assembly. The preparation of laws and regulations will be guided by juridical and religious provisions, which best conform to the modus operandi of the people and the needs of the times, as well as established customs. The functions and responsibilities of the Council of Ministers shall be fixed by a special law.
- Article 8: The government of the Grand National Assembly exercises the executive function through ministers who are elected according to its special law. The Grand National Assembly directs the ministers on executive affairs and changes them when necessary.
- Article 9: The Head of the Grand National Assembly who is elected by the General Assembly is the Head of the Grand National Assembly for one electoral period. With this status, he is entitled to sign on behalf of the Assembly and to approve the decisions of the Council of Ministers. The Council of Ministers elects one member from among its number as the head of the Council of Ministers. However, the Head of the Grand National Assembly is the natural head of the Council of Ministers.

Article 10 is headed Administration. Articles 11 to 21 concern local government units. These subdivisions are called Vilâyet (Art. 11–14), Kaza (Art. 15) and Nahiye (Art. 16–21). Articles 22 to 23 provide for the General Inspectorate (Umumi Müfettişlik). There is also a final provisional article, which is unnumbered.
