= Turkish Constitution of 1924 =

Fundamental law of the Republic of Turkey from 1924 to 1961

The Constitution of 1924, formally titled the Constitution of the Republic of Turkey (Ottoman Turkish: Teşkilât-ı Esasiye Kanunu; Turkish: 1924 Anayasası), was the fundamental law of Turkey from 1924 to 1961. It replaced the Constitution of 1921 and was ratified by the Grand National Assembly of Turkey following the proclamation of the republic on October 29, 1923. It was ratified on April 20, 1924. It remained in force until the 1960 coup d'état, following which it was replaced by the Constitution of 1961.

== Summary ==
The Turkish Constitution of 1924 had 105 articles and was divided into six sections:

- Section I - Fundamental Provisions, Articles 1-8: Section I describes the basic structural concepts of the newly established Turkish government. These provisions included establishment of a republic which places legislative and executive power in the hands of the Grand National Assembly of Türkiye who are given the authority to elect the President of Türkiye . Judicial power is extended to independent courts that are sanctioned by the National Assembly in accordance to their established laws. The provisions also declare the national capital of Angora, the religion of state is Islam, and Turkish as the official national language.
- Section II - The Legislative Power, Articles 9-30: Section II establishes the electoral laws of the new government, the legislative capabilities of the National Assembly, and the procedure for the election of the President of Turkey. The right to vote is given to Turkish citizens who are 18 years of age or older, and those age 30 and older may run for official positions in government if they meet the requirements of office. Elections for members of the National Assembly take place every four years and those elected maintain their position until their term ends and they are not reelected or are impeached by a vote among the Assembly. The National Assembly is given sole legislative power as well as control over the national budget and the creation of international treaties.
- Section III - The Executive Power, Articles 31-52: Section III establishes the electoral procedure for the office of the President of Turkey and the limits of the powers of the executive. The president is elected every four years following the election of the National Assembly, is elected by the members of the new National Assembly, and takes power immediately following his election. This section also gives the president power to approve and veto legislation drafted by the National Assembly, appoint his own cabinet ministers, and grants the president authority over the military as chief of the armed forces.
- Section IV - The Judicial Power, Articles 53-67: Section IV elaborates upon the fundamental structure of the judiciary under the new republic by establishing the duties of officially appointed judges and the creation of a 21 member High Court. This High Court consists of 11 members of the Court of Appeals and 10 members of the Council of State who are elected to the High Court by their own membership. The decisions of the High Court are final and cannot be subject to confirmation or veto by the other branches of power.
- Section V - Public Law of the Turks, Articles 68-88: Section V defines the general rights and freedoms afforded to the Turkish people under the new government. These rights include free speech, freedom of assembly, freedom of movement, and freedom of religion. This section also specifically defines the term "Turk" in a legal manner and also establishes the basic foundations of the tax codes to be used under the new republic.
- Section VI - Miscellaneous Provisions, Government Officials and Employees, Finance, and Amendments to the Constitution, Articles 89-105: The final section of the Constitution of 1924 includes provisions that define the territories that make up the new Turkish state, define eligibility for candidates for positions in government jobs, establish the procedure for creation of a national budget, and establish the procedure in which amendments to the constitution may be presented to the National Assembly.

== Timeline ==
The Constitution of 1924 was in application for 36 years from 1924 until 1961. During this time, it served as the basis for many fundamental changes that sought to transform Turkey into a modern, secular and democratic Republic.

- The ratification of the Constitution on April 20, 1924.
- The list of 150 personae non gratae of Turkey, ratified on April 23, 1924 (revised June 1, 1924), declared about 150 persons, who were holding high positions within the imperial government or were fierce supporters of the Ottoman Sultan, unwanted in the new Republic.

== Amendments ==
The first change occurred on April 10, 1928, which changed, inter alia, Article 2 and the provision of "Religion of the Turkish state is Islam" was removed. Further changes followed on 10 and December 11, 1931 and 1934 respectively. As a result, women were given the right to vote and stand for election. In 1937, the constitution was changed twice. Law No. 3115 of February 5, 1937 enshrined the six basic principles of Kemalism in the Constitution.

On January 10, 1945, the constitution was revised with Law No. 4695 in the sense of Turkification of the language and translated into modern Turkish. However, this recast was reversed by Law No. 5997 of December 24, 1952 (published on December 31, 1952 in Resmî Gazete No. 8297), which restored the constitution to its constitution before 1945.

== See also ==
- Politics of Turkey
- Mustafa Kemal Atatürk
