= Turkish Constitution of 1961 =

Fundamental law of the Republic of Turkey from 1961 to 1982

The Constitution of 1961 (Turkish: 1961 Anayasası), officially titled the Constitution of the Republic of Turkey (Turkish: Türkiye Cumhuriyeti Anayasası), was the fundamental law of Turkey from 1961 to 1982. It was introduced following the 1960 coup d'état, replacing the earlier Constitution of 1924. It was approved in a referendum held on 9 July 1961, with 61.7% of the nation voting in favor. It remained in force until the 1980 coup d'état, following which it was replaced by a new document, the Constitution of 1982, which remains in force today.

== General principles ==
=== I. Form of the state ===
Article 1 - The Turkish State is a republic.

=== II. Characteristics of the Republic ===
Article 2 - The Turkish Republic is a nationalistic, democratic, secular and social state, governed by the rule of law, based on human rights and fundamental tenets set forth in the preamble.

=== III. Indivisibility of the State, its official language and its seat of government ===
Article 3 - The Turkish State is an indivisible whole comprising its territory and people. Its official language is Turkish. Its capital is the city of Ankara.

=== IV. Sovereignty ===
Article 4 - Sovereignty is vested in the nation without reservation and condition. The nation shall exercise its sovereignty through the authorized agencies as prescribed by the principles laid forth in the Constitution. The right to exercise such sovereignty shall not be delegated to any one person, group or class. No person or agency shall exercise any state authority, which does not derive its origin from the Constitution.

=== V. Legislative Power ===
Article 5 - Legislative power is vested in the Grand National Assembly. This power shall not be delegated.

=== VI. Executive Function ===
Article 6 - The executive function shall be carried out by the President of the Republic and the Council of Ministers within the framework of law.

=== VII. Judicial Power ===
Article 7 - Judicial power shall be exercised by independent courts on behalf of the Turkish nation.

=== VIII. Supremacy and the binding force of the Constitution ===
Article 8 - Laws shall not be in conflict with the Constitution. The provisions of the Constitution shall be the fundamental legal principles binding the legislative, executive and judicial organs, administrative authorities and individuals.

=== IX. Irrevocability of the form of the State ===
Article 9 - The provision of the Constitution establishing the form of the state as a republic shall not be amended nor shall any motion therefore be made.

== Difference between 1924 and 1961 constitutions ==
Unlike the former constitution, the new constitution was based on human rights; with Article 11, the individual's freedom was secured at all times. The phrase social state was included in this Constitution for the first time. The new constitution also introduced the Senate, to form a bicameral system with the National Assembly.

The Grand National Assembly was formed of the National Assembly and Senate of the Republic. The National Assembly and the majority of senators were elected by the nation, but 15 senators were chosen by the President among former presidents and members of the National Unity Committee, which had organised the coup d'état.
