= Sanjak of Karasi =

Sanjak of the Ottoman Empire

Karasi Sanjak Karesi Sancağı
- Sanjak of the Ottoman Empire
- 1341–1923
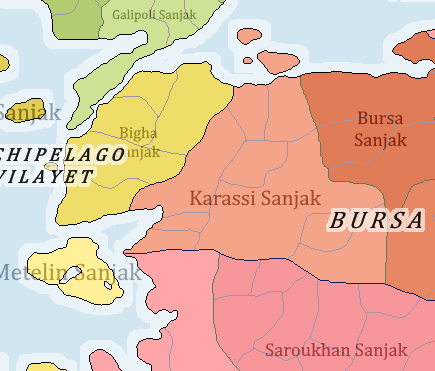
- Karasi Sanjak in 1914
- Capital: Karasi
- Government
  - Type: Sanjak of Ottoman Empire
- History
  - Established: 1341
  - Treaty of Lausanne: 29 October 1923 1923
Preceded by	Succeeded by
Karasids	Republic of Turkey

Karasi Sanjak, (Turkish: Karesi Sancağı; c. 1341–1922) was one of the first sanjaks of the Ottoman Empire established around 1341 and disestablished after signing the Treaty of Lausanne.

Despite being established in 1341, the Sanjak first only existed in name, not holding any lands until the Ottoman conquest of the Beylik of Karasi in 1361.

In the 16th-century, the Sanjak of Karasi comprised the kazas of Balıkesri, Ayazmend (Altınoluk), Bigadiç, Edremid, İvrindi and Manyas.
