= Ankara Eyalet =

Administrative division of the Ottoman Empire from 1827 to 1864

Eyālet-i Ānqarâ
- Eyalet of the Ottoman Empire
- 1827–1864
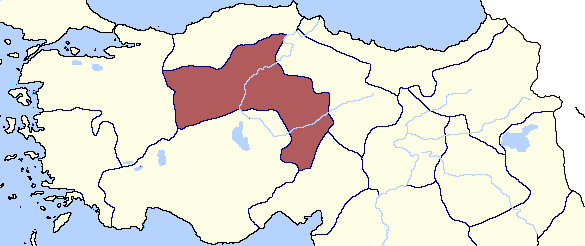
- The Ankara Eyalet in 1861
- Capital: Initially Yozgat, then Ankara
- Area
  - Coordinates: 39.6684°N 33.4858°E
- History
  - Established: 1827
  - Disestablished: 1864
| Preceded by | Succeeded by |
| Anatolia Eyalet | Ankara Vilayet |
- Today part of: Turkey

The Eyalet of Ankara (Ottoman Turkish: ایالت آنقره; Eyālet-i Ānḳara) or Angora, also known as the Eyalet of Bosok or Bozok, was an eyalet of the Ottoman Empire from 1827 until its abolition in 1864.

== Administrative divisions ==
Sanjaks of the Eyalet in the mid-19th century:

1. Sanjak of Kaisarieh (Cesarea)
2. Sanjak of Bozok (Yozgat)
3. Sanjak of Angora (Ankara)
4. Sanjak of Kiangri (Cangara)
