= Kapudanlik =

Kapudanlik may refer to:

- Kapudan Pasha
- Eyalet of the Archipelago (Modern Turkish: Derya Kaptanlığı)
- Kapudanlik of Suez (Süvey Kaptanlığı)
- Kapudanlik of Shatt al-Arab (Şattü'l Arab Kaptanlığı)
- Morea Eyalet (Kapudanlik of Anapoli, Anapoli Kaptanlığı)
