= Sanjak of Kavala =

Sanjak of Kavala Ottoman Turkish: Liva-i Kavala
- Sanjak of the Ottoman Empire
- before 1588–ca. 1864
- Capital: Kavala
- History
  - Established: before 1588
  - Disestablished: ca. 1864
- Today part of: Greece

The Sanjak of Kavala (Ottoman Turkish: Sancak-i/Liva-i Kavala; Greek: λιβάς/σαντζάκι Καβάλας) was a second-level Ottoman province (sanjak or liva) encompassing the region around the port town of Kavala (now in Greece) in eastern Macedonia.

== History ==
The town probably fell into Ottoman hands ca. 1383, shortly after the fall of Serres. In the 15th century, the region of Kavala was known for its cereal and silk production, but chiefly for its silver mines.

The sanjak is attested by Leunclavius in 1588, and again in the seventh volume of Evliya Çelebi's travel books as a province of the Eyalet of the Archipelago, but in the fifth volume of the same work simply as a captaincy of the Sanjak of Gallipoli. At the time of Evliya Çelebi's visit, it comprised 12 ziamets and 235 timars and was subdivided into seven kazas.

In the 18th century and the first half of the 19th century, Drama was a sanjak of the Rumeli Eyalet; its revenue was usually granted to the pasha of Salonica, who governed the sanjak through a fiscal agent (mütesellim). With the administrative reforms of 1864, the sanjak was abolished and incorporated in the Sanjak of Drama, part of the Salonica Vilayet. Drama remained the centre of a kaza in the new province.

== See also ==
- Kavala (regional unit)

== Sources ==
- Birken, Andreas [in German] (1976). Die Provinzen des Osmanischen Reiches [The Provinces of the Ottoman Empire]. Beihefte zum Tübinger Atlas des Vorderen Orients, 13 (in German). Reichert. ISBN 3-920153-56-1.
- Beldiceanu-Steinherr, I. & Giannopoulos, J. G. (1978). "Ḳawāla". In van Donzel, E.; Lewis, B.; Pellat, Ch. & Bosworth, C. E. (eds.). The Encyclopaedia of Islam, Second Edition. Volume IV: Iran–Kha. Leiden: E. J. Brill. pp. 776–777. OCLC 758278456.
