= Aegean Archipelago Province, Ottoman Empire =

Aegean Archipelago Province may refer to

- Eyalet of the Archipelago, Ottoman Empire
- Vilayet of the Archipelago, Ottoman Empire
