= Sanjak of Biga =

Ottoman province

Coordinates: 40.040833°N 26.560278°E

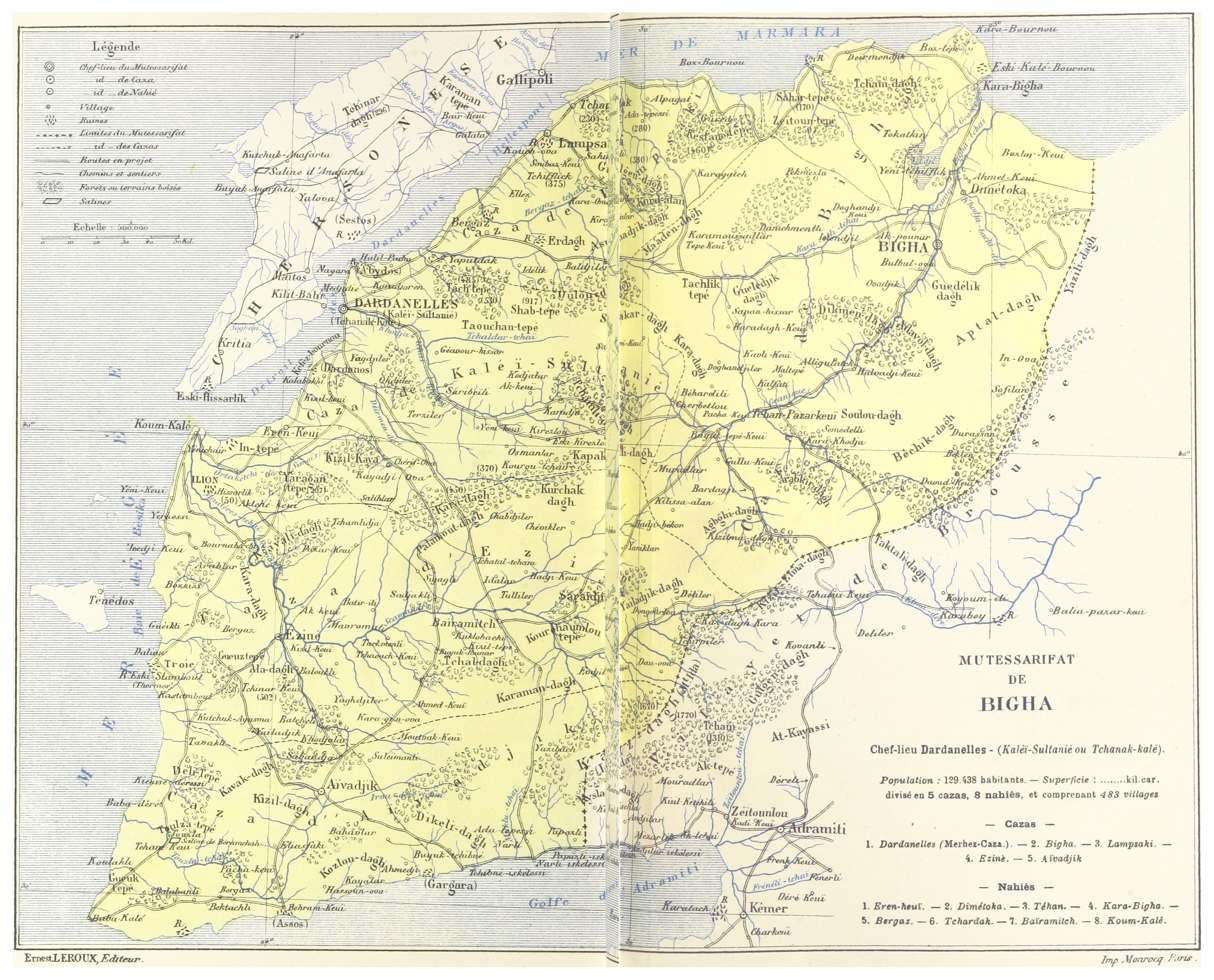
Map of the independent district (mutasarrifate) of Biga in 1894

The Sanjak of Biga was a second-level Ottoman province (sanjak or liva), roughly corresponding to the modern Çanakkale Province of Turkey.

== History ==
The area of the sanjak was conquered from the Byzantine Empire by 1363, and with the establishment of the Anatolia Eyalet became part of it. In 1533 it was transferred to the newly created Eyalet of the Archipelago. In 1841, it was transferred to the Hüdavendigâr Eyalet, where it remained until 1867, when it became the capital (pasha-sanjak) of the Vilayet of the Archipelago (formed from the former eyalet of the same name). The governor's seat was not at Biga, however, but at Kale-i Sultaniye.

In the 16th-century, the Sanjak of Biga comprised the kazas of Biga, Balya, Çan, Çatalbergos, Ezinebazarı (İne, İnebazarı) and Lapseki.

In 1877, the sanjak was moved to the Istanbul Vilayet, before becoming part of the short-lived Karasi Vilayet (1881–88). After the latter's dissolution, Biga became an independent sanjak, roughly equivalent to the modern Çanakkale Province, except for the Gallipoli peninsula, which was a separate sanjak. In the last decades of the Ottoman Empire, it was often called after its capital as Kale-i Sultaniye (modern Çanakkale).

== Sources ==
- Birken, Andreas [in German] (1976). Die Provinzen des Osmanischen Reiches [The Provinces of the Ottoman Empire]. Beihefte zum Tübinger Atlas des Vorderen Orients, 13 (in German). Reichert. ISBN 3-920153-56-1.
