= Suğla =

Suğla can refer to:

- Sanjak of Suğla, an Ottoman province on the Aegean coast
- Lake Suğla, a lake in central Anatolia
