= Aydin Province (disambiguation) =

Aydin Province may refer to:

- Aydın Province, one of the provinces of the Republic of Turkey
- Aidin Eyalet, one of the eyalet of the Ottoman Empire
- Aidin Vilayet, one of the vilayet of the Ottoman Empire
