= Sanjak of Nakşa Berre =

Sanjak of Nakşa Berre Liva-i Nakşa Berre
- Sanjak of the Ottoman Empire
- 1579–1821
- Capital: Naxos
- History
  - Annexation of the Duchy of Naxos: 1579
  - Greek War of Independence: 1821
Preceded by	Succeeded by
Duchy of the Archipelago	First Hellenic Republic
- Today part of: Greece

The Sanjak of Nakşa Berre or Naxos (Ottoman Turkish: Sancak-i/Liva-i Nakşa Berre; Greek: λιβᾶς/σαντζάκι Νάξου) was a second-level Ottoman province (sanjak or liva) encompassing the central and southern Cyclades islands, and named after the two largest islands of Naxos (Turkish: Nakşa) and Paros (Tr. Berre). The sanjak encompassed the territory of the former Duchy of Naxos, which had been tributary to the Ottomans since 1537, but was not formally incorporated into the Empire until after 1579, when the last Duke, Joseph Nasi, died. The sanjak formed part of the Eyalet of the Archipelago at least by 1600, but is no longer attested after the late 18th century. Aside from the sanjakbey at Naxos, two other beys, at Milos and Santorini, are recorded in 1629. With the outbreak of the Greek War of Independence in 1821, the islands came under Greek control.

== Sources ==
- Birken, Andreas (1976). Die Provinzen des Osmanischen Reiches. Beihefte zum Tübinger Atlas des Vorderen Orients (in German). Vol. 13. Reichert. p. 106. ISBN 9783920153568.
- Savvides, A. (1993). "Naḳs̲h̲e". In Bosworth, C. E.; van Donzel, E.; Heinrichs, W. P. & Pellat, Ch. (eds.). The Encyclopaedia of Islam, Second Edition. Volume VII: Mif–Naz. Leiden: E. J. Brill. pp. 939–941. ISBN 978-90-04-09419-2.
- Savvides, A. (1995). "Para". In Bosworth, C. E.; van Donzel, E.; Heinrichs, W. P. & Lecomte, G. (eds.). The Encyclopaedia of Islam, Second Edition. Volume VIII: Ned–Sam. Leiden: E. J. Brill. pp. 265–266. ISBN 978-90-04-09834-3.
