= 1913 in the Ottoman Empire =

- Decades: 1890s; 1900s; 1910s; 1920s
- See also: Other events of 1913; List of years in the Ottoman Empire

The following lists events that happened during 1913 in the Ottoman Empire.

== Incumbents ==
- Sultan: Mehmed V
- Grand Vizier:
  - until January 23: Kâmil Pasha
  - January 23-June 11: Mahmud Shevket Pasha
  - starting June 12: Said Halim Pasha

== Events ==
=== January ===
- January 14 - The London Peace Conference ended as the Balkan states and the Ottoman Empire were unable to reach an agreement in negotiations.
- January 15 - The Ottoman battle cruiser Medjidie attacked and sank the Greek merchant ship Macedonia, which had been armed for use as a troop transport.
- January 17 - The six European powers sent a joint note advising the Ottoman Empire to surrender Adrianople and the Aegean Islands.
- January 20 - Bulgaria, Serbia and Montenegro presented an ultimatum to the Ottoman Empire, giving the Turks 14 days to make a favorable reply to their demands or face a resumption of war.
- January 22 - The Ottoman Grand Council voted to surrender Edirne to the Balkan Allies and to accept the other demands for peace, including ceding its Aegean islands and Edirne.
- January 23 - Raid on the Sublime Porte: Members of the Committee of Union and Progress under Enver Bey forced Grand Vizier Kâmil Pasha, of the rival Freedom and Accord Party, to resign at gunpoint, with Mahmud Shevket Pasha being made the new premier. Naval Minister Nazım Pasha was shot and killed in unclear circumstances as he confronted the mob outside the Council Chambers.
- January 28 - The Young Turks council of the Committee of Union and Progress voted unanimously to fight the surrender of Edirne and the Aegean islands, in accordance with the demands of the new leader, Enver Bey.
- January 30 - The Ottoman Empire replied to the ultimatum of the Great Powers at the end of the First Balkan War and agreed to give up most of Edirne except for the Muslim shrines, but it refused to surrender its Aegean islands.
