= Sanjak of Inebahti =

Administrative province of the Ottoman Empire

Sanjak of Inebahti Ottoman Turkish: Liva-i Inebahti
- Sanjak of the Ottoman Empire
- 1499–1821/1829
- Central Greece in the early 19th century, showing the sanjak of Inebahti ("Lepanto") in the lower image
- Capital: Naupaktos (Inebahti/Aynabahti, Lepanto)
- History
  - Established: 1499
  - Greek War of Independence: 1821/1829
| Preceded by | Succeeded by |
| Republic of Venice; Sanjak of Tirhala | First Hellenic Republic |
- Today part of: Greece

The Sanjak of Inebahti or Aynabahti (Ottoman Turkish: Sancak-i/Liva-i İnebahtı/Aynabahtı; Greek: λιβάς/σαντζάκι Ναυπάκτου) was a second-level Ottoman province (sanjak or liva) encompassing the central parts of Continental Greece. Its name derives from its capital, Inebahti/Aynabahti, the Turkish name for Naupaktos, better known in English with its Italian name, Lepanto.

== History ==
The province was formed in 1499, when the Ottomans conquered Lepanto, which had been a possession of the Republic of Venice since 1407. Much of the territory allocated to the new province, however, had already been under Ottoman control, under the Sanjak of Tirhala.

On 7 October 1571, the famous Battle of Lepanto between the fleets of the Ottoman Empire and the Holy League was fought off the coast of the town of Lepanto. The Venetians retook the town in 1687, during the Morean War, but surrendered it to Turkish control in 1699, after the Treaty of Karlowitz. Although most of the province rose in revolt upon the outbreak of the Greek War of Independence in 1821, the capital Lepanto remained in Ottoman hands until 12 March 1829, when it came under Greek control.

== Administrative division ==
Originally, the sanjak formed part of the Rumeli Eyalet, but after 1533 it was subordinated to the new Eyalet of the Archipelago.

According to the 17th-century geographer Hajji Khalifa, the province encompassed six kazas ("districts"): Inebahti itself, Karavari (Kravara), Abukor (Apokouros), Olendirek/Olunduruk (Lidoriki), Gölhissar (Probably Limnochori) and Kerbenesh (Karpenisi).

Early 19th-century sources report that the sanjak at the time formed part of the Morea Eyalet, and comprised again six kazas: Inebahti, Abukor, Olendirek/Olunduruk, Gölhissar, Kerbenesh and Patracik (Ypati).
