= Eyalet =

1590s–1866 Ottoman administrative division

Provinces of the Ottoman Empire in Europe, Asia, and Africa in 1692, divided into beylerbeyliks, protectorates and tributary states. By Guillaume Sanson (1633–1703).

The eyalet (Ottoman Turkish: ایالت, pronounced [ejaːˈlet], lit. 'province'), also known as beylerbeylik or pashalik, was the primary administrative division of the Ottoman Empire.

From 1453 to the beginning of the nineteenth century the Ottoman local government was loosely structured. The empire was at first divided into states called eyalets, presided over by a beylerbey (title equivalent to duke in English and Amir al Umara in Arabic) of three tails (feathers borne on a state officer's ceremonial staff). The grand vizier was responsible for nominating all the high officers of state, both in the capital and the states. Between 1861 and 1866, these eyalets were abolished, and the territory was divided for administrative purposes into vilayets (provinces).

The eyalets were subdivided into districts called livas or sanjaks, each of which was under the charge of a pasha of one tail, with the title of mira-lira, or sanjak-bey. These provinces were usually called pashaliks by Europeans. The pasha was invested with powers of absolute government within his province, being the chief of both the military and financial departments, as well as police and criminal justice.

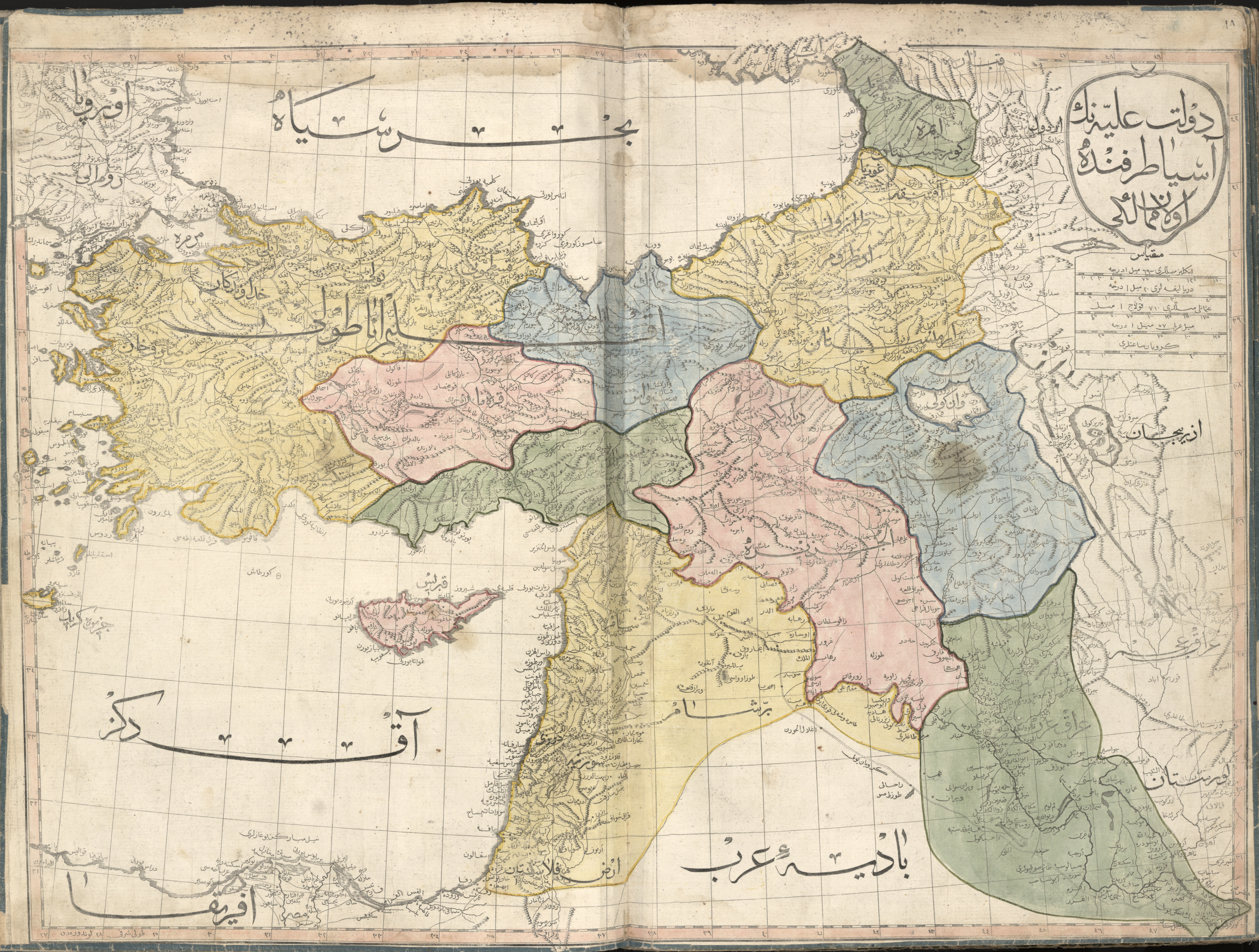
The 1803 Cedid Atlas, showing the Middle Eastern eyalets

At official functions, the order of precedence was Egypt, Baghdad, Abyssinia, Buda, Anatolia, "Mera'ish", and the Kapudan Pasha in Asia and Buda, Egypt, Abyssinia, Baghdad, and Rumelia in Europe, with the remainder arranged according to the chronological order of their conquest.

== Names ==
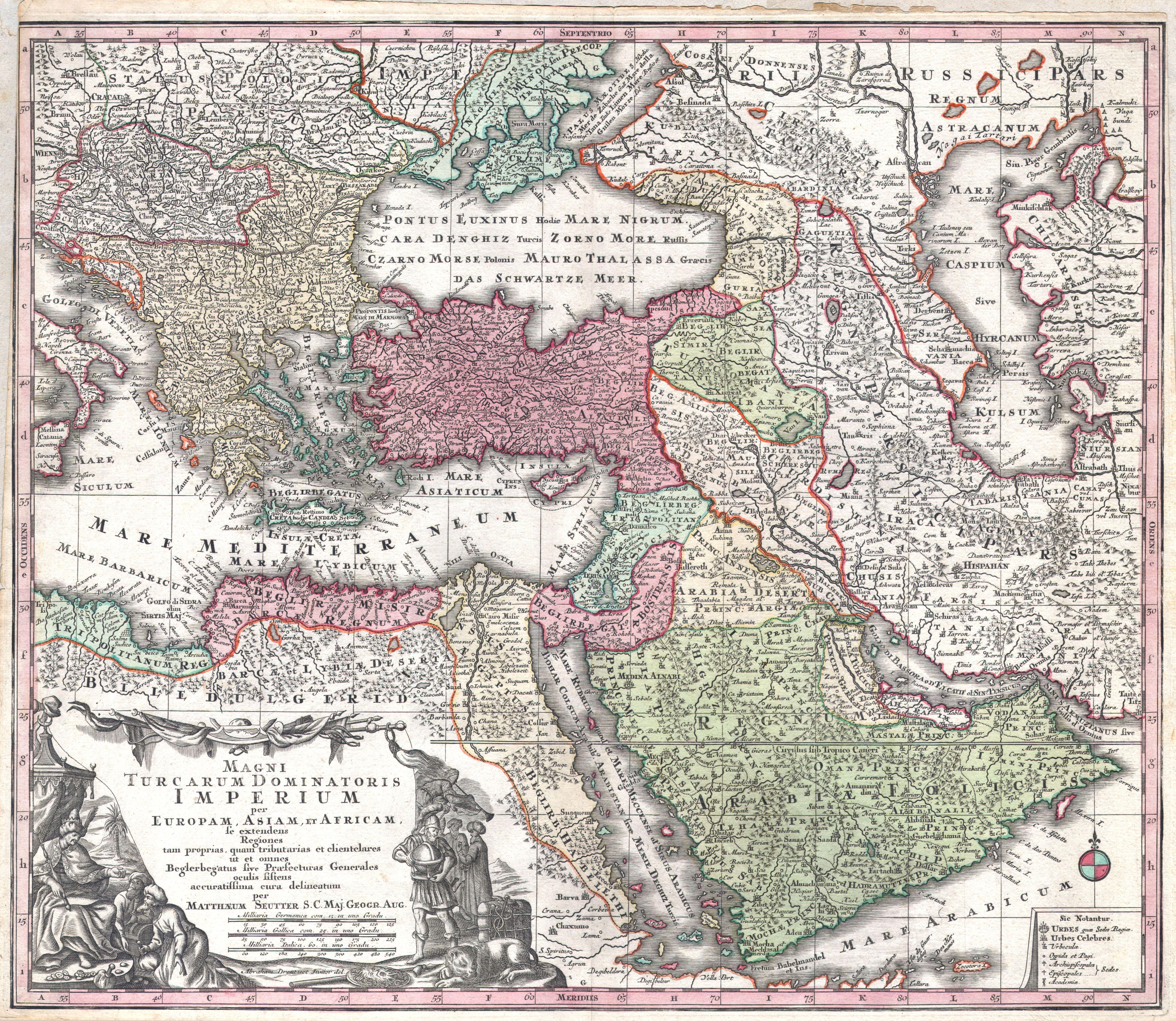
1730 map

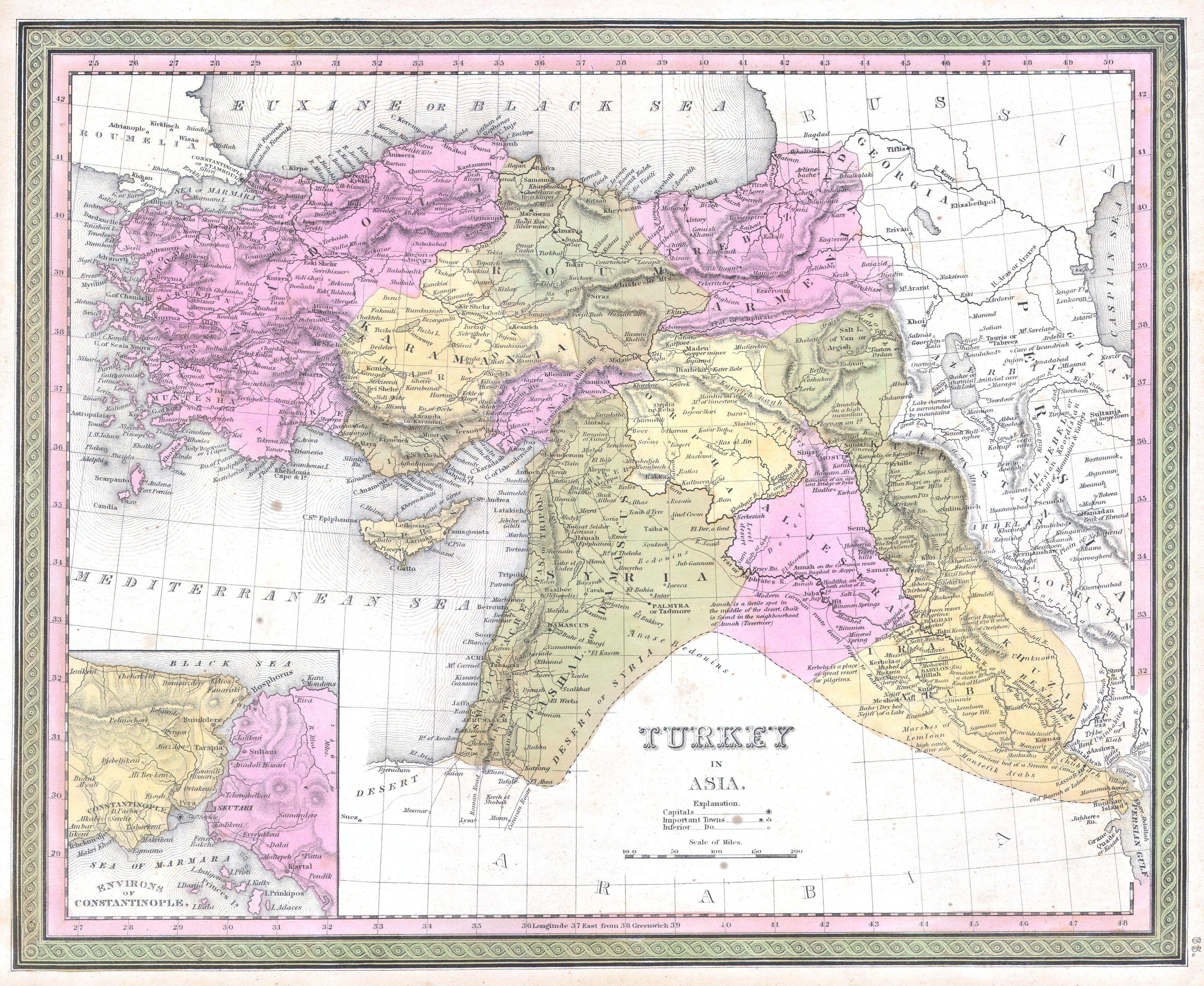
1849 map

Two European maps of the Ottoman Empire. The first map describes the provinces as "beylerbeyliks", whereas the second describes them as "pashaliks"

The term eyalet is sometimes translated province or governorate. Depending on the rank of the governor, they were also sometimes known as pashaliks (governed by a pasha), beylerbeyliks (governed by a bey or beylerbey), and kapudanliks (governed by a kapudan).

Pashaluk or Pashalik (Turkish: paşalık) is the abstract word derived from pasha, denoting the quality, office or jurisdiction of a pasha or the territory administered by him. In European sources, the word "pashalic" generally referred to the eyalets.

The term 'eyalet' began to be applied to the largest administrative unit of the Ottoman Empire instead of beglerbegilik from the 1590s onward, and it continued to be used until 1867.

== History ==
Murad I instituted the great division of the sultanate into two beylerbeyiliks of Rumelia and Anatolia, in circa 1365. With the eastward expansion of Bayezid's realms in the 1390s, a third eyalet, Rûm Eyalet, came into existence, with Amasya its chief town. This became the seat of government of Bayezid's youngest son, Mehmed I, and was to remain a residence of princely governors until the 16th century.

In 1395, Bayezid I executed the last Shishmanid Tsar of Bulgaria, and annexed his realm to Rumelia Eyalet. In 1461, Mehmed II expelled the last of the Isfendyarid dynasty from Sinop, awarding him lands thus taxation authority near Bursa in exchange for his hereditary territory. The Isfendyarid principality became a district of Anatolia Eyalet. In 1468, Karaman Eyalet was established, following the annexation of the formerly independent principality of Karaman; Mehmed II appointed his son Mustafa as governor of the new eyalet, with his seat at Konya.

The 16th century saw the greatest increase in the number of eyalets, largely through the conquests of Selim I and Süleyman I, which created the need to incorporate the new territory into the structure of the Empire, and partly through the reorganisation of existing territory. A list dated 1527 shows eight eyalets, with Egypt, Damascus, Diyarbekir and Kurdistan added to the original four. The last eyalet, however, did not survive as an administrative entity. Süleyman's conquests in eastern Turkey, Iraq and Hungary also resulted in the creation of new eyalets.

The former principality of Dulkadir became the Dulkadir Eyalet at some time after its annexation in 1522. After the Iranian campaign of 1533–6, the new eyalets of Erzurum, Van, Sharazor and Baghdad guarded the frontier with Iran. In 1541 came the creation of Budin Eyalet from part of the old Kingdom of Hungary. The Eyalet of the Archipelago was created by Süleyman I especially for Hayreddin Barbarossa in 1533, by detaching districts from the shores and islands of the Aegean which had previously been part of the eyalets of Rumelia and Anatolia, and uniting them as an independent eyalet.

In 1580, Bosnia, previously a district of Rumelia, became an eyalet in its own right, presumably in view of its strategically important position on the border with the Habsburgs. Similar considerations led to the creation of the Kanije Eyalet from the districts adjoining this border fortress, which had fallen to the Ottomans in 1600. In the same period, the annexation of the Rumelian districts on the lower Danube and the Black Sea coast, and their addition to territories between the Danube and the Dniepr along the Black Sea, created the Silistra Eyalet. At the same time, on the south-eastern shore of the Black Sea, Trebizond Eyalet came into being. The purpose of this reorganisation, and especially the creation of the eyalet of Özi was presumably to improve the defences of the Black Sea ports against the Cossacks.

Eyalets in 1609

By 1609, according to the list of Ayn Ali, there were 32 eyalets. Some of these, such as Tripoli, Cyprus or Tunis, were the spoils of conquest. Others, however, were the products of administrative division.

In 1795, the government launched a major reorganization of the provincial administration, with a law decreeing that there would be 28 provinces, each to be governed by a vizer. These were Adana, Aleppo, Anatolia, Baghdad, Basra, Bosnia, Childir, Crete, Constantinople, Damascus, Diyarbekir, Egypt, Erzurum, Habesh, Karaman, Kars, Dulkadir, the Archipelago, Morea, Mosul, Rakka, Rumelia, Sayda, Sharazor, Silistra, Sivas, Trebizond, Tripoli, Van. In practice, however, central control remained weak, and beylerbeyliks continued to rule some provinces, instead of vizers.

== Government ==
The beylerbeyliks where the timar system was not applied, such as Abyssinia, Algiers, Egypt, Baghdad, Basra and Lahsa, were more autonomous than the others. Instead of collecting provincial revenues through sipahis, the beylerbey transferred fixed annual sums to Constantinople, known as the salyane.

By 1500, the four central eyalets of the Empire, Rumelia, Anatolia, Rum and Karaman, were under direct rule. Wallachia, Moldavia and the Khanate of the Crimea, territories which Mehmed II had brought under his suzerainty, remained in the control of native dynasties tributary to the Sultan. So, too, did the Kingdom of Hungary after the battle of Mohács in 1526.

== Map ==
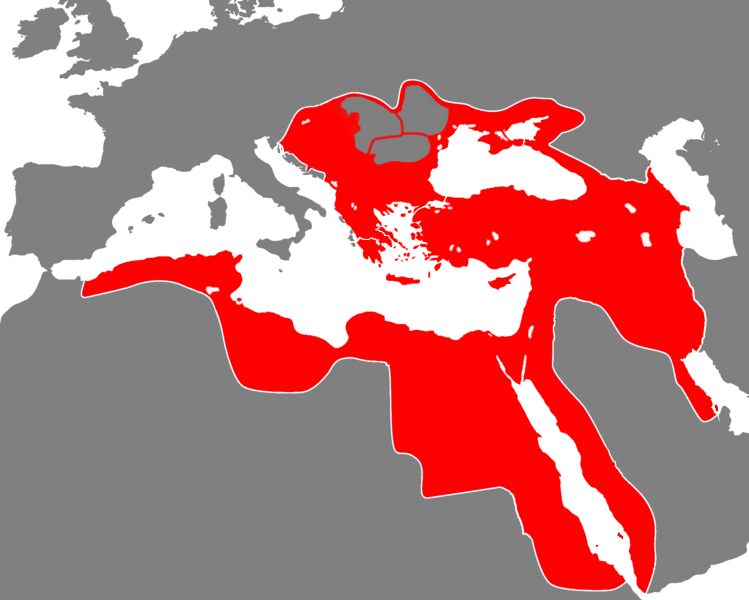

== List ==
From the mid-14th century until the late 16th century, only one new beylerbeylik (Karaman) was established.

=== Disappeared before 1609 ===
The eyalets that existed before 1609 but disappeared include the following:

Province Name	Ottoman Turkish Name and Transliteration (Modern Turkish)	Existed for	
Abkhazia	Abhazya	? years (1578–?)	also called Sukhum [Sohumkale] or Georgia [Gürcistan] and included Mingrelia and Imeretia as well as modern Abkhazia – nominally annexed but never fully conquered
Akhaltsikhe	Ahıska	? years (1603–?)	either split from or coextensive with Samtskhe
Dagestan	Dağıstan	? years (1578–?)	also called Demirkapı – assigned a serdar [chief] rather than a beylerbeyi
Dmanisi	Tumanis	? years (1584–?)	
Ganja	Gence	16 years (1588–1604)	
Gori	Gori	? years (1588–?)	probably replaced Tiflis after 1586
Győr	Yanık	04 years (1594–1598)	
Ibrim	Ìbrīm	01 year (1584-1585)	temporary promotion of the sanjak of Ibrim
Kakheti	Kaheti	? years (1578–?)	Kakhetian king was appointed hereditary bey
Lazistan	Lazistān	? years (1574–?)	
Lorri	Lori	? years (1584–?)	
Nakhichevan	Nahçivan	01 year (1603 only)	possibly never separate from Yerevan
Poti	Faş	? years (1579–?)	may have also been another name for Trabzon
Sanaa	San'a	02 years (1567–1569)	temporary division of Yemen
Shemakha	Şamahı	01 year (1583 only)	may have also been another name for Shervan
Szigetvár	Zigetvar	04 years (1596–1600)	later transferred to Kanizsa
Shervan	Şirvan	26 years (1578–1604)	overseen by a serdar [chief] rather than a beylerbeyi
Tabriz	Tebriz	18 years (1585–1603)	
Tiflis	Tiflis	08 years (1578–1586)	probably replaced by Gori after 1586
Wallachia	Eflak	2 months (September–October 1595)	the rest of the time Wallachia was a separate autonomous principality
Yerevan	Erivan	21 years (1583–1604)	sometimes also included Van
Zabid	Zebit	02 years (1567–1569)	temporary division of Yemen

=== Eyalets in 1609 ===
Conquests of Selim I and Suleyman I in the 16th century required an increase in administrative units. By the end of the latter half of the century there were as many as 42 eyalets, as the beylerbeyliks came to be known. The chart below shows the administrative situation as of 1609.

Province Name	Ottoman Turkish Name and Transliteration (Modern Turkish)	Existed for	
Habesh	Habeş	313 years (1554–1867)	Included areas on both sides of the Red Sea. Also called "Mecca and Medina"
Adana	آضنه Ażana (Adana)	257 years (1608–1865)	
Archipelago	جزایر بحر سفید Cezayir-i Bahr-i Sefid	329 years (1535–1864)	Domain of the Kapudan Pasha (Lord Admiral); Also called Denizi or Denizli, later Vilayet of the Archipelago
Aleppo	حلب Ḥaleb (Halep)	330 years (1534–1864)	
Algiers	جزایر غرب Cezâyîr-i Ġarb (Cezayir Garp, Cezayir)	313 years (1517–1830)	
Anatolia	Anadolu	448 years (1393–1841)	Second Eyalet
Baghdad	بغداد Baġdâd (Bağdat)	326 years (1535–1861)	Until the Treaty of Zuhab (1639), Ottoman rule was not consolidated.
Basra	بصره Baṣra (Basra)	324 years (1538–1862)	
Bosnia	Bosna	284 years (1580–1864)	
Budin	Budin	145 years (1541–1686)	
Kıbrıs	قبرص Ḳıbrıṣ (Kıbrıs)	092 years (1571–1660; 1745–1748)	
Diyarbekir	دیار بكر Diyârbekir (Diyarbakır)	305 years (1541–1846)	
Eger	اكر Egir (Eğri)	065 years (1596–1661)	
Egypt	مصر Mıṣır (Mısır)	350 years (1517–1867)	
Erzurum	Erzurum	334 years (1533–1867)	Until the Treaty of Zuhab (1639), Ottoman rule was not consolidated.
Al-Hasa	Lahsa	110 years (1560–1670)	Seldom directly ruled
Kefe (Theodosia)	كفه Kefe	206 years (1568–1774)	
Kanizsa	Kanije	086 years (1600–1686)	
Karaman	Karaman	381 years (1483–1864)	
Kars	Kars	295 years (1580–1875)	Until the Treaty of Zuhab (1639), Ottoman rule was not consolidated. Bounded to Erzurum Eyalet in 1875.
Dulkadir	Maraş, Dulkadır	342 years (1522–1864)	
Mosul	Musul	329 years (1535–1864)	Until the Treaty of Zuhab (1639), Ottoman rule was not consolidated.
Ar-Raqqah	Rakka	278 years (1586–1864)	
Rumelia	Rumeli	502 years (1365–1867)	First Eyalet
Childir	Çıldır	267 years (1578–1845)	Also called Meskheti, later possibly coextensive with Akhaltsikhe (Ahıska) Province. Most of eyalet passed to Russia in 1829. Remained parts of eyalet bounded to Erzurum in 1845.
Shahrizor	Şehrizor	132 years (1554–1686)	Also Shahrizor, Sheherizul, or Kirkuk. In 1830, this eyalet bounded to Mosul province as Kirkuk sanjak.
Silistria	Silistre	271 years (1593–1864)	Later sometimes called Ochakiv (Özi); First beylerbeyi was the Crimean khan
Sivas	Sivas	466 years (1398–1864)	
Syria	شام Şam	348 years (1517–1865)	
Temeşvar	Tımışvar (Temeşvar)	164 years (1552–1716)	
Trebizond, Lazistan	Trabzon	403 years (1461–1864)	
Tripoli (Tripoli-in-the-East)	طرابلس شام Trablus-ı Şam (Trablusşam)	285 years (1579–1864)	
Tripolitania (Tripoli-in-the-West)	طرابلس غرب Trablus-ı Garb (Trablusgarp)	313 years (1551–1864)	
Tunis	Tunus	340 years (1524–1864)	
Van	وان Van	316 years (1548–1864)	Until the Treaty of Zuhab (1639), Ottoman rule was not consolidated.
Yemen	یمن Yemen	142 years (1517–1636; 1849–1872)	

Sources:

- Colin Imber. The Ottoman Empire, 1300-1650: The structure of Power. (Houndmills, Basingstoke, Hampshire, UK: Palgrave Macmillan, 2002.)
- Halil Inalcik. The Ottoman Empire: The Classical Age 1300–1600. Trans. Norman Itzkowitz and Colin Imber. (London: Weidenfeld & Nicolson, 1973.)
- Donald Edgar Pitcher. An Historical Geography of the Ottoman Empire (Leiden, Netherlands: E.J. Brill, 1972.)

=== Established 1609–1683 ===
Province Name	Ottoman Turkish Name and Transliteration (Modern Turkish)	Existed for	
Crete	Girid	198 years (1669–1867)	
Morea	Mora	181 years (1620–1687) and (1715–1829)	originally part of Aegean Archipelago Province
Podolia	Podolya	27 years (1672–1699)	overseen by several serdars (marshals) rather than by beylerbeyi (governors)
Sidon	Sayda	181 years (1660–1841)	
Uyvar	Uyvar	22 years (1663–1685)	
Varad	Varad	31 years (1661–1692)	

=== Established 1826–1864 ===
Province Name	Ottoman Turkish Name and Transliteration (Modern Turkish)	Existed for
Adrianople	Edirne	38 years (1826–1864)
Monastir	Manastır	38 years (1826–1864)
Salonica	Selanik	38 years (1826–1864)
Aidin	Aydın	38 years (1826–1864)
Ankara	Ankara	37 years (1827–1864)
Kastamonu	Kastamonu	37 years (1827–1864)
Herzegovina	Hersek	18 years (1833–1851)
Hüdavendigâr	Hüdavendigâr	26 years (1841–1867)
Karasi	Karesi	02 years (1845–1847)
Niš	Niş	18 years (1846–1864)
Kurdistan	Kurdistan	21 years (1846–1867)
Vidin	Vidin	18 years (1846–1864)

== Maps ==
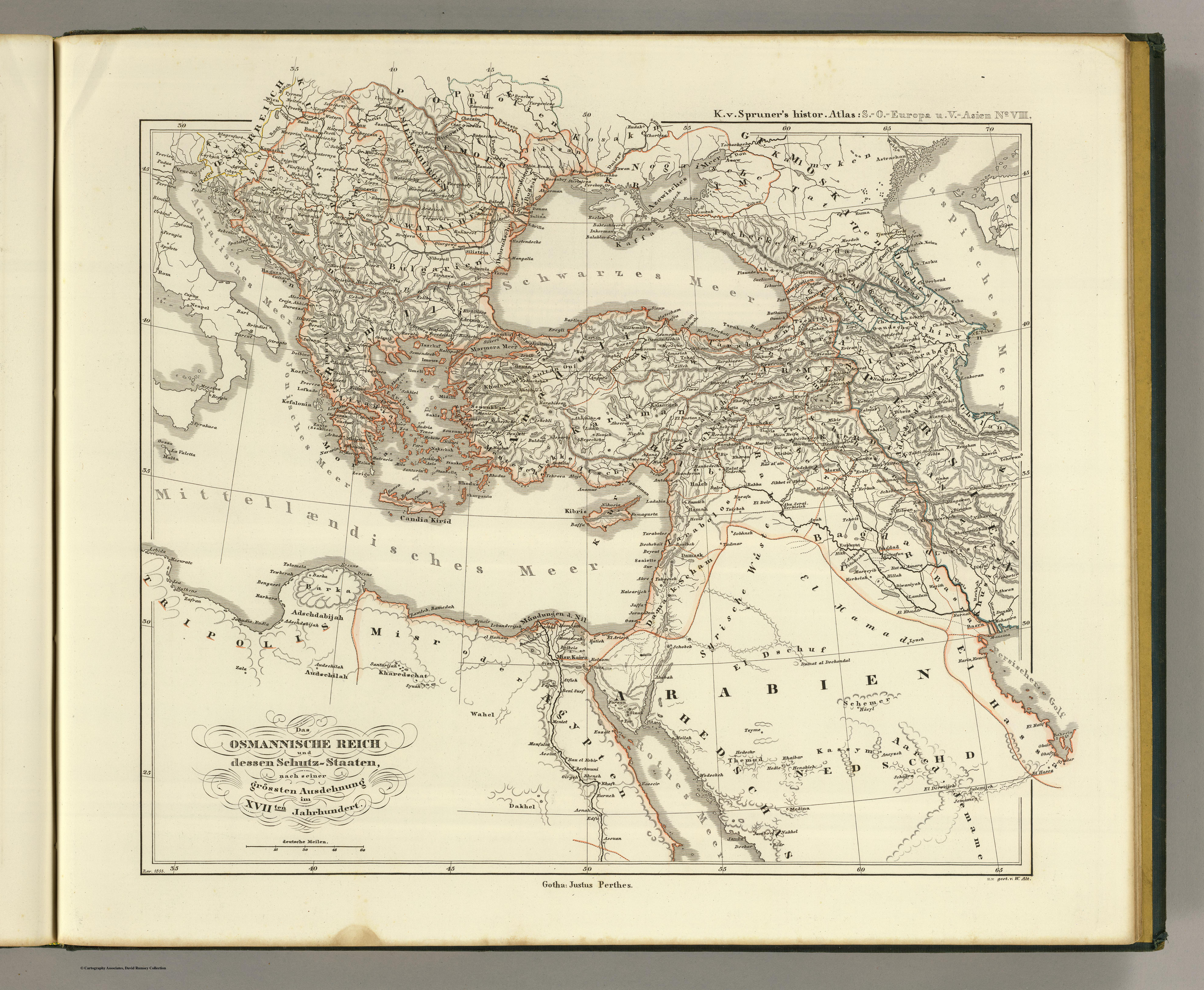
Eyalets in the 17th century

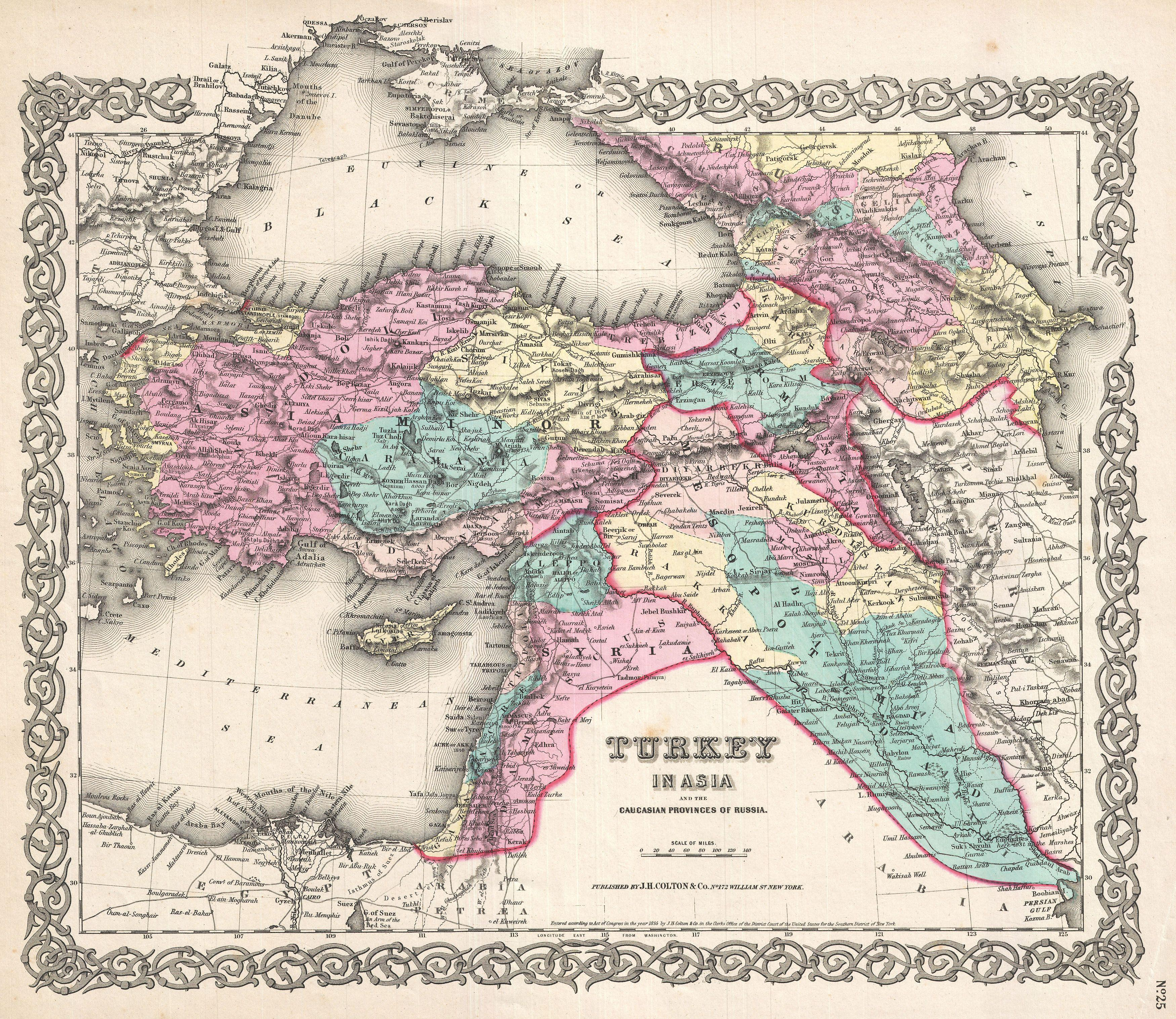
1855 map of Turkey in Asia by Joseph Hutchins Colton

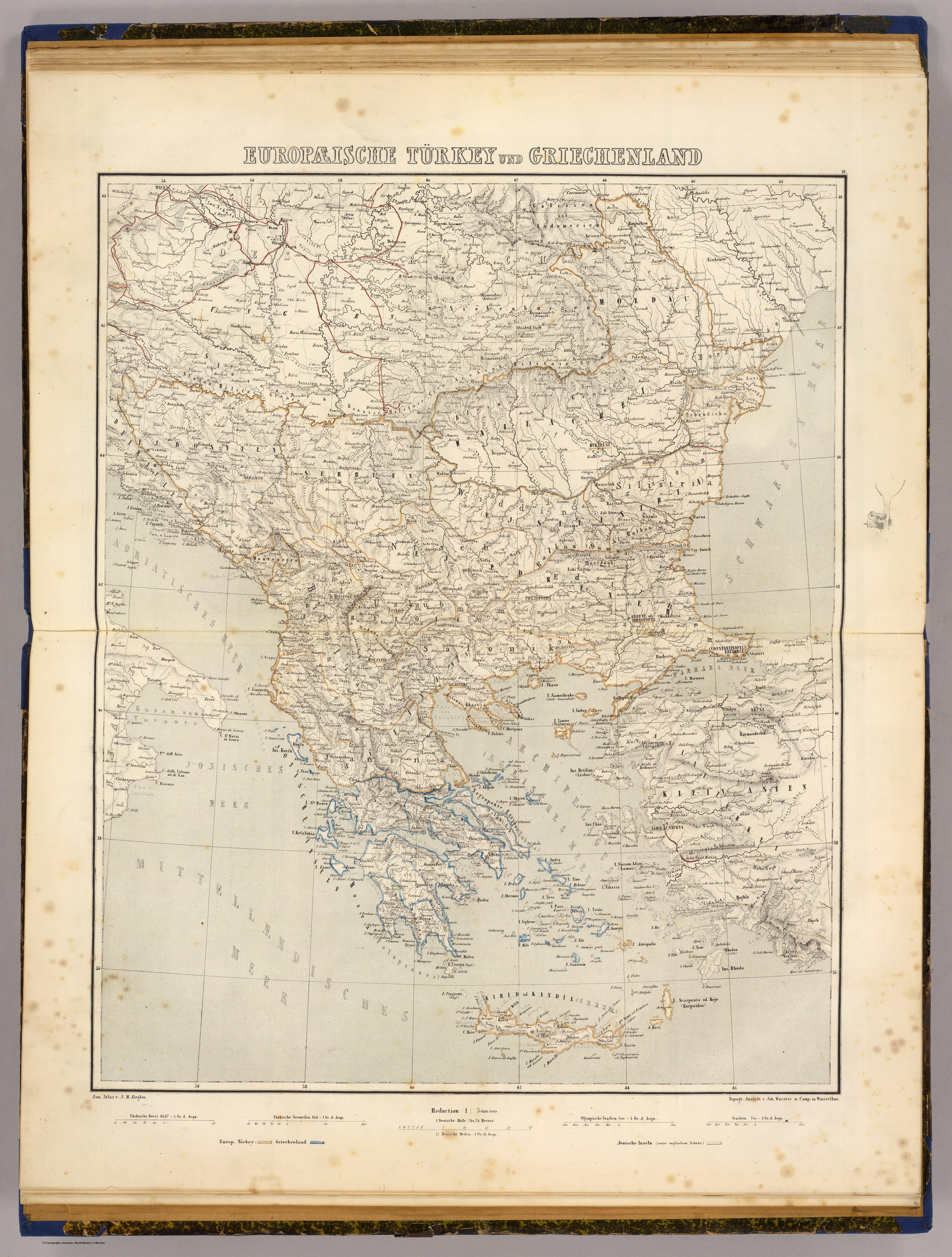
Map of European Turkey by Carl Ritter, published in 1864

== Modern usage of the term ==
Turkish Language Association defines the word eyalet as "an administrative division having some kind of administrative independence" and in modern Turkish, the word eyalet is used widely in the context of federalism, corresponding to the English word state. While the word eyalet is out of use in Turkish public administration, replaced long ago by ils under a unitary structure, top-level administrative subdivisions of numerous federal states are called "eyalet" in Turkish, such as the states of Australia, Austria, Brazil, Germany, India, Malaysia, Mexico and the United States, sometimes along with the provinces of Argentina, Canada and Pakistan, deferent to the modern definition of the word. Albeit China and Iran are legally unitary states, these countries' provinces may also occasionally be referred to as eyalet in Turkish.

== See also ==
- Administrative divisions of the Ottoman Empire
