= Siege of Livadeia =

Military engagement in 1821 during the Greek Revolution

- Part of the Greek War of Independence
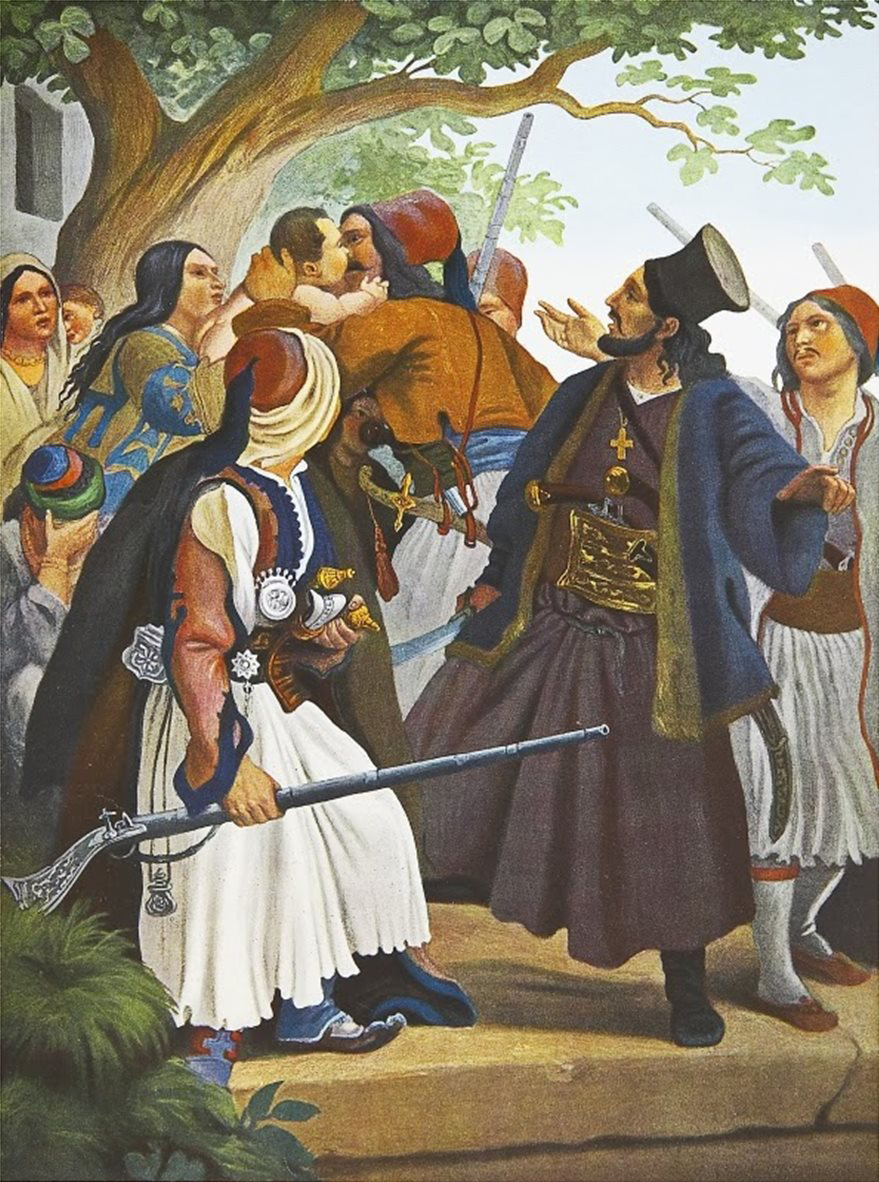
- Diakos and Bousgos gather warriors
Date	30 March – 4 April 1821 (5 days)
Location	Livadeia, Boeotia, Rumelia Eyalet, Ottoman Empire
Result	Greek victory

Belligerents
Greek revolutionaries	Ottoman Empire

Commanders and leaders
Athanasios Diakos; Vasilis Bousgos	Voivode Hasan Aga

Strength
100 armatoloi and many armed Arachovites	800 armed Turks and Albanians

The siege of Livadeia was a military engagement of the Greek War of Independence.

== The development of events ==
After the uprising in Lidoriki and Malandrino, Livadia raised the flag of the revolution with the chieftains Athanasios Diakos and Vasilis Bousgos. They, having 100 of their comrades and recruiting many others from Arachova and other villages of the province, occupied the positions of Zagaras and Profitis Hlias above the city of Livadeia at night. From there they sent and blocked the passages of the Turks, and after consulting with the city's leaders and reconciling them, they entered the city with the flag of freedom on March 30.

The Turks, seeing the armed invasion of the Greeks, closed themselves in the strongest houses. On March 31, a battle took place that lasted five days. Roukis and others climbed the fortress at night to take it, but were repelled by the Turks who noticed them. Finally, the besieged were forced to abandon it due to lack of food and water, and laid down their arms.

Athanasios Diakos collected the spoils and handed them over to the prefects to buy food and ammunition for the army. He himself set out with 600 men towards Vodonitsa and Thermopylae, because there was a rumor that the enemy troops were gathering.
