= Sanjak of Rhodes =

Ottoman province encompassing the Dodecanese

Sanjak of Rhodes Liva-i Rodos (Ottoman Turkish)
- Sanjak of the Ottoman Empire
- 1522–1912
- Flag
- Capital: Rhodes
- History
  - Ottoman conquest of Rhodes: 1522
  - Italian capture: 1912
Preceded by	Succeeded by
Hospitaller Rhodes	Italian Islands of the Aegean
- Today part of: Greece

The Sanjak of Rodos or Rhodes (Ottoman Turkish: Sancak-i/Liva-i Rodos; Greek: λιβάς/σαντζάκι Ρόδου) was a second-level Ottoman province (sanjak or liva) encompassing the Dodecanese or Southern Sporades islands, off the coast of Anatolia in the Eastern Mediterranean, with Rhodes as its centre.

== History ==
After the Ottoman conquest of Rhodes from the Knights Hospitaller in 1522, the island initially became the seat of a beylerbey, and was not subordinated to the Eyalet of the Archipelago as a sub-province (sanjak) until 1546. However, for most of the duration of Ottoman rule, apart from Rhodes itself, the other Southern Sporades islands (the remainder of the Dodecanese including Samos) were practically autonomous, and were not subject to a centralized administration until the introduction of the uniform vilayet-based administrative system in the 1860s. Rhodes itself did not enjoy this autonomy, and declined during the early Ottoman period both as a commercial centre and as a site of military importance, since the Eastern Mediterranean became an Ottoman lake. Only from the 18th century on is there evidence for an economic upturn in the island. In 1748, Hungarian, Georgian and Maltese slaves on board the ship Lupa revolted and sailed the ship to Hospitaller Malta taking over 150 Ottomans prisoner, including Mustafa, the former Pasha of Rhodes. In Malta, Mustafa attempted to instigate a Muslim slave revolt which was to have taken place on 29 June 1749, but the plotters were discovered and punished. Mustafa returned to the Ottoman Empire in 1751 after the intercession of France.

During the Greek War of Independence, Rhodes and Kos did not take part in the uprising, although many Rhodians were members of the Filiki Etaireia and fled to join the Greek rebels. The other islands of the sanjak however rose up, most prominently Kasos until its destruction in 1824.

Rhodes apparently became the seat of the Kapudan Pasha (the chief admiral of the Ottoman Navy, who also served as governor of the Archipelago Eyalet) in the late 17th century. In 1849, Rhodes became officially the pasha-sanjak of the Archipelago province, now separated from any relation with the Kapudan Pasha. With the introduction of the vilayet system, the capital of the new Vilayet of the Archipelago was transferred to Kale-i Sultaniye in 1867, returned to Rhodes in 1877, went to Chios in 1880, before finally returning to Rhodes in 1888.

In 1912, the year the province was occupied by the Kingdom of Italy during the Italo-Turkish War, it comprised the kazas (districts) of Rodos itself, Kasot (Kasos), Mis (Kastellorizo), Sömbeki (Symi), Kerpe (Karpathos), and Istanköy (Kos). The islands were slated to be returned to the Ottoman Empire after the Treaty of Ouchy, but Italy took advantage of the outbreak of the Balkan Wars to continue its occupation. The islands were finally ceded to Greece in 1947, in the aftermath of World War II.
