= Karli-Eli =

Administrative unit of the Ottoman Empire

Sanjak of Karli-Eli Liva-i Karli-Eli
- Sanjak of the Ottoman Empire
- c. 1480–1821
- Map of Central Greece in the early 19th century, showing the sanjak of Karli-Eli ("Karlali") in the lower left corner
- Capital: Angelokastron, Vrachori
- History
  - Established: c. 1480
  - Greek War of Independence: 1821
Preceded by	Succeeded by
Tocco family	Venetian Ionian Islands; Senate of Western Continental Greece
- Today part of: Greece

Karli-Eli (Turkish: Karlıeli, Greek: Κάρλελι, romanized: Karleli), also Karli-Ili or Karlo-Ili, was an Ottoman province (sanjak) in the region of Aetolia-Acarnania in Western Greece from the late 15th century until the Greek War of Independence.

The name, meaning "Land of Charles" in Turkish, derived from the region's last important Christian rulers, Carlo I Tocco (r. 1386–1430), or his nephew and successor, Carlo II Tocco (r. 1430–1448).

== Ottoman conquest ==
In the early 15th century, Carlo I Tocco, the Count palatine of Cephalonia and Zakynthos, became the ruler of most of western continental Greece (Aetolia-Acarnania and Epirus). After his death in 1429/30, the Ottomans took over most of Epirus, leaving his nephew Carlo II Tocco to rule over a truncated realm as an Ottoman vassal. When he too died in 1448, his heir Leonardo III Tocco attempted to seek Venetian protection, whereupon the Ottomans began to occupy the remaining mainland territories, seizing Arta in 1449.

The Toccos held out in their southern capital, Angelokastron, until 1460. After the latter's fall, only Vonitsa remained in Tocco hands in the mainland, but pressure eased while the Ottomans were distracted by the Ottoman–Venetian War of 1463–1479. Immediately after its conclusion, an Ottoman fleet under Gedik Ahmed Pasha conquered the remnants of the Tocco principality, although Cephalonia and Zakynthos were lost again in 1481. The last Christian outpost on the mainland, Nafpaktos (Lepanto), a Venetian colony since 1407, was conquered by the Ottomans in 1499.

== Organization as a province and history ==
The former Tocco territories were formed as the administrative unit (sanjak) of Karli-Eli between 1475 and 1489, first as part of the Rumelia Eyalet, and later, probably around 1550, under the Eyalet of the Archipelago, a province established in 1533 and subordinated to the chief admiral of the Ottoman navy, the Kapudan Pasha.

The 17th-century geographers Hajji Khalifa and Evliya Çelebi record that the province encompassed six kazas (districts): Santa Maura (Lefkada), Vonitsa, Angelokastron (in Turkish Enkili-Kastri), Xiromero (Tr. Eksemere), Valtos (Tr. Alto), and Vrachori (Tr. Imrahor). Hajji Khalifa also adds Preveza, but this is possibly an error, since Evliya does not mention it. In terms of land distribution, in 1534, Karli-Eli is recorded as having six ziamets and 124 timars, while at the time of his writing (1656) Hajji Khalifa mentions eleven ziamets and 119 timars, with the land allotted to the governor (hass) producing a revenue of 264,000 akçes. The seat of the governor or sanjakbey was Angelokastron until the late 17th century, when it was devastated by the Venetians during the Morean War. The capital was then moved to nearby Vrachori, which Evliya describes as a prosperous town of 300 houses during his visit in 1688.

Santa Maura and Vonitsa were conquered by the Venetians in 1684, during the early stages of the Morean War, and were ceded to them in the Treaty of Karlowitz in 1699. At about the same time, Missolonghi and Anatolikon were unofficially detached from the kaza of Angelokastron and became a distinct voevodalik. In addition, the sanjak as a whole now began to be granted as hass to other provincial governors or persons in the imperial court. Consequently, from the early 18th century on, Karli-Eli was governed by a mutesellim rather than a sanjakbey.

From 1788, the ambitious semi-independent Albanian ruler of Ioannina, Ali Pasha, coveted Karli-Eli and tried to gain control over it by intervening in its governance. Finally, in October 1798 he invaded the province, forcing its mutesellim to seek refuge in the citadel of Vonitsa. The Ottoman government reacted by granting the entire sanjak of Karli-Eli (minus the voevodalik of Missolonghi) as a personal hass to Mihrişah Valide Sultan, the mother of Sultan Selim III (r. 1789–1809), thus putting it beyond Ali Pasha's reach. From 1799 until 1805, the province was administered by Yusuf Agha, a cousin of the Valide Sultan's treasurer, but in 1806, probably due to the death of Mihrişah the year before, Ali Pasha managed to gain control of Karli-Eli, which he kept until the Ottoman government turned against him in 1820. Soon after, the region took part in the Greek War of Independence, with the town of Missolonghi playing a crucial part in the Greeks' struggle for freedom (cf. Siege of Missolonghi). The entirety of Karli-Eli became part of Greece when it was recognized as an independent kingdom.
