= Nakhchivan Eyalet =

Possible eyalet of the Ottoman Empire

Nakhchivan Eyalet was possibly an eyalet of the Ottoman Empire. Nakhchivan (Nahçivan) was recorded as a beylerbeylik in 1603. In 1591, there were references to a beylerbeylik of Erivan and Nakhchivan, and scholar Donald E. Pitcher speculates that Nakhchivan may have never been a separate eyalet.
