= Sanjak of Suğla =

Coordinates: 37.75°N 27.41°E

The Sanjak of Suğla was a second-level Ottoman province (sanjak or liva) encompassing the region around Smyrna (modern İzmir) and to its south, around Söke.

== History ==
Smyrna and its surrounding region did not come under permanent Ottoman control until 1425. The area became a sanjak within the Anatolia Eyalet until 1533, when it was transferred to the newly created Eyalet of the Archipelago. The sanjak seems not to have existed in c. 1520, however. Furthermore, Leunclavius in 1588 does not mention it, and Ayni Ali still records Suğla as part of the Anatolia Eyalet in c. 1600, as does Hezarfen Huseyn Efendi in c. 1680.

In the 17th century, the capital of the sanjak was at Söke, before being moved to Smyrna in the 18th. According to the 17th-century traveller Evliya Çelebi, it was subdivided into 13 districts (kazas): İzmir (Smyrna), Karaburun, Urla, Çeşme, Sığacık, Sivrihisar, Aynaabad, Ğumaabad, Kızılhisar, Ayasluğ, Kuşadası, Balat, and Söke. The entire sanjak was sometimes called after Sığacık, but according to Hezarfen Huseyn Efendi, it formed a separate sanjak under the Anatolia Eyalet.

As part of the Tanzimat reforms, Suğla was transferred to the short-lived Saruhan Eyalet when it was founded (probably in 1841, certainly by 1846), and was moved to the Aydin Eyalet when Saruhan was abolished in 1847. In 1850, it was united with the capital sub-province (pasha-sanjak) of İzmir.

== Sources ==
- Birken, Andreas [in German] (1976). Die Provinzen des Osmanischen Reiches [The Provinces of the Ottoman Empire]. Beihefte zum Tübinger Atlas des Vorderen Orients, 13 (in German). Reichert. ISBN 3-920153-56-1.
