= Eyalet of Adrianople =

Administrative division of the Ottoman Empire from 1826 to 1867

Eyālet-i Edirne Еялет Адрианопол Εγιαλέτ της Αδριανούπολης
- Eyalet of the Ottoman Empire
- 1826–1867
- Flag

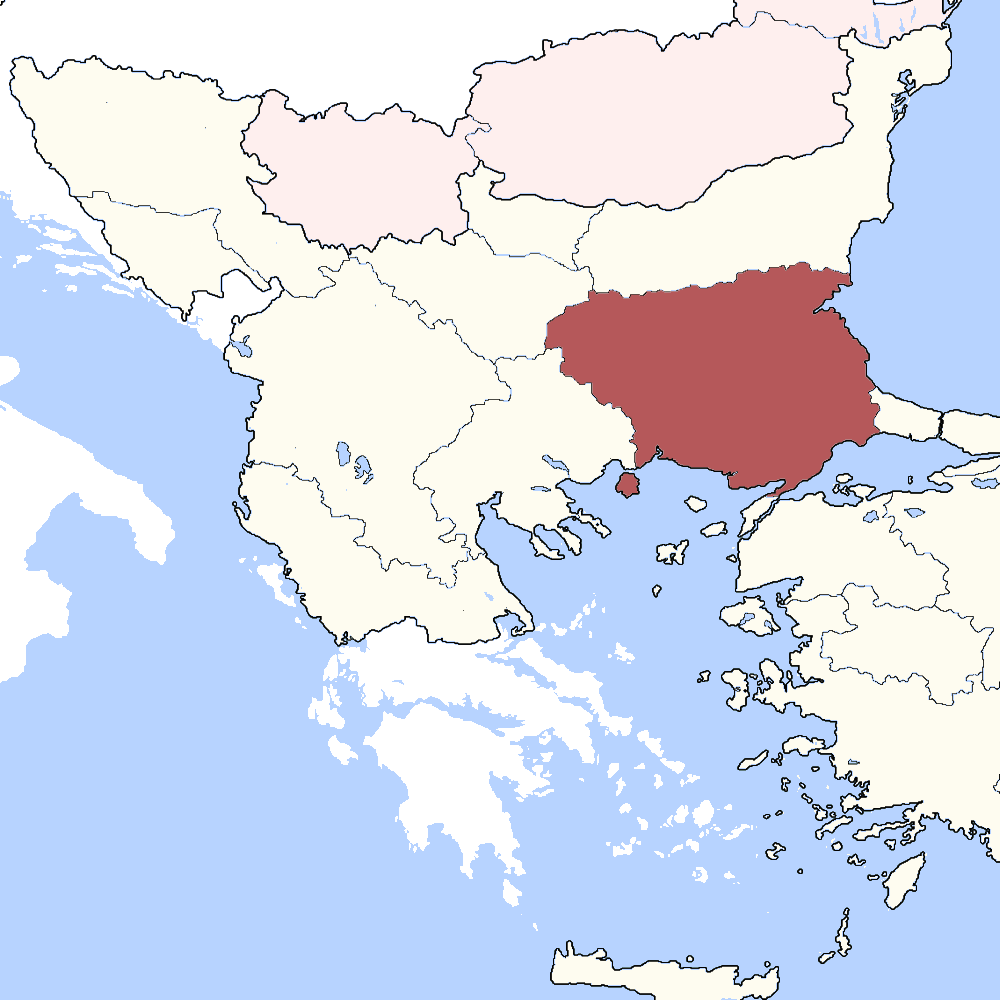
- The Adrianople Eyalet in the 1850s
- Capital: Adrianople (Edirne)
- Area
  - Coordinates: 41°40′N 26°34′E
- Population
  - 1844: 1,200,000
- History
  - Established: 1826
  - Disestablished: 1867
Preceded by	Succeeded by
Rumelia Eyalet; Silistra Eyalet	Adrianople Vilayet
- Today part of: Turkey; Greece; Bulgaria

The Eyalet of Adrianople or Edirne or Çirmen (Ottoman Turkish: ایالت ادرنه; Eyālet-i Edirne) was constituted from parts of the eyalets of Silistra and Rumelia in 1826.

It was one of the first Ottoman provinces to become a vilayet after an administrative reform in 1865, and by 1867 it had been reformed into the Vilayet of Adrianople.

== Administrative division ==
The eyalet comprised almost all of the historical geographical region of Thrace, and comprised the following subdivisions (sanjaks or livas):

1. Sanjak of Nevahi-i Erbaa (capital: Çatalca)
2. Sanjak of Tekfürtaği (Rodosto) or Vize
3. Sanjak of Gelibolu (Gallipoli)
4. Sanjak of Edirne (Adrianople)
5. Sanjak of Filibe (mod. Plovdiv)
6. Sanjak of Islimiye (mod. Sliven) or Eski Zagra (Stara Zagora)

The sanjaks were further subdivided into 50 kazas or prefectures.
