= Morea Eyalet =

Administrative division of the Ottoman Empire from 1661 to 1821

Eyālet-i Mōrâ
- Eyalet of the Ottoman Empire
- 1461–1686; 1715–1821
- Flag

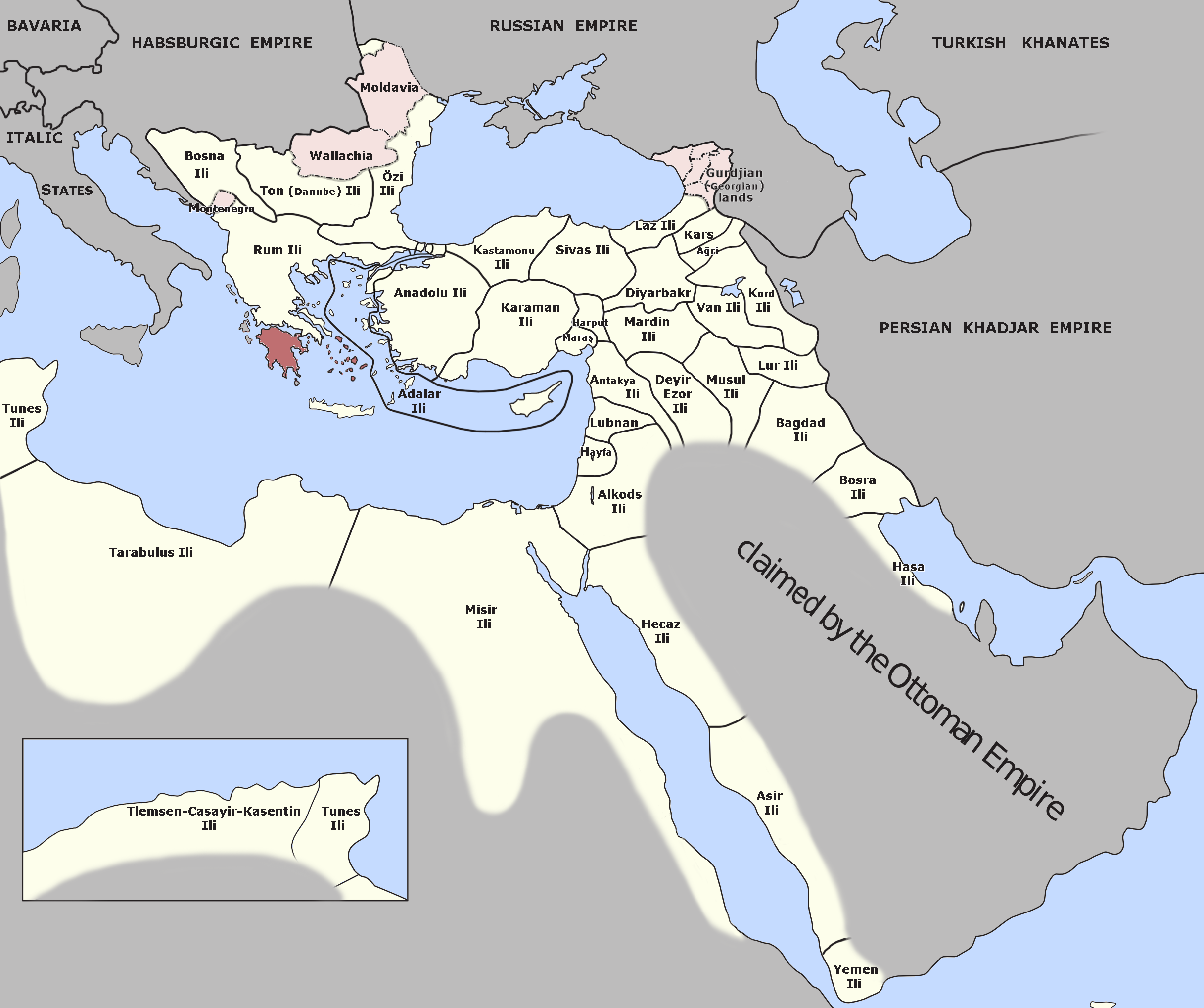
- The Morea Eyalet in 1795
- Capital: Corinth, Nauplia, Tripolitza
- Area
  - Coordinates: 37°56′N 22°56′E
- History
  - Ottoman conquest of the Morea: 1461
  - Venetian occupation: 1685/7
  - Ottoman reconquest: 1715
  - Orlov Revolt: 1770
  - Greek War of Independence: 1821 (De jure to 1829)
Preceded by	Succeeded by
Eyalet of the Archipelago; Kingdom of the Morea	Kingdom of the Morea; First Hellenic Republic

The Eyalet of the Morea (Ottoman Turkish: ایالت موره, romanized: Eyālet-i Mōrâ) was a first-level province (eyalet) of the Ottoman Empire, centred on the Peloponnese peninsula in southern Greece.

== History ==
=== From the Ottoman conquest to the 17th century ===
The Ottoman Empire overran the Peloponnese between 1458 and 1460, conquering the last remnants of the Byzantine Empire, with the exception of the Venetian strongholds, which were taken gradually over decades of intermittent Ottoman–Venetian Wars. Coron and Modon fell in 1500, and by 1540, the Ottoman conquest of the Peloponnese had been completed with the capture of Monemvasia and Nauplion.

Upon its conquest, the peninsula was made a sanjak of the Rumelia Eyalet, with its capital first at Corinth (Turk. Kordos or Gördes), later in Leontari (Londari), Mystras (Mezistre or Misistire) and finally in Nauplion (Tr. Anaboli). Since the 16th century, Mystras formed a separate sanjak, usually attached to the Eyalet of the Archipelago rather than Rumelia.

=== Creation of the eyalet, Venetian interlude and second Ottoman period ===
Sometime in the mid-17th century, as attested by the traveller Evliya Çelebi, the Morea became the centre of a separate eyalet, with Patras (Tr. Ballibadra) as its capital. The Venetians occupied the entire peninsula during the Morean War (1684–1699), establishing the "Kingdom of the Morea" (Regno di Morea) to rule the country. Venetian rule lasted until the Ottoman reconquest in 1715, which led to the re-establishment of the eyalet. The capital was first at Nauplia, but after 1786 at Tripolitza (Tr. Trabliçe).

The Moreote Christians rose against the Ottomans with Russian aid during the so-called "Orlov Revolt" of 1770, but it was swiftly and brutally suppressed. As a result, the total population decreased during this time, while the proportion of the Muslim element in it increased. Nevertheless, the privileges granted to the Orthodox population with the Treaty of Kuchuk-Kainarji, especially the right to trade under the Russian flag, led to a considerable economic flowering of the local Greeks, which, coupled with the increased cultural contacts with Western Europe (Modern Greek Enlightenment) and the inspiring ideals of the French Revolution, laid the groundwork for the Greek War of Independence.

During the Greek War of Independence, most of the peninsula fell to the Greek rebels in 1821–1822, but internal conflicts among the rebels and the arrival of Ibrahim Pasha of Egypt in 1825 almost extinguished the rebellion by 1826. The intervention of British, French and Russian naval troops in the Battle of Navarino forced the Ottoman and Egyptian troops to evacuate the Morea by 1 October 1828. Finally, Greece became independent from the Ottoman Empire with Treaty of Adrianople.

== Administration ==
=== Central government ===
During the second period of Ottoman rule, the eyalet was headed by the Mora valesi, who until 1780 was a pasha of the first rank (with three horsetails) and held the title of vizier. After 1780 and until the Greek War of Independence, the province was headed by a muhassil. The pasha of the Morea was aided by a number of subordinate officials, including a Christian translator (dragoman), who was the senior Christian official of the province. A provincial council, the 'Divan of the Morea' (Διβάνιον τοῦ Μορέως), advised the pasha. It was composed of two semi-annually elected primates, holding the unofficial rank of mora ayan (μοραγιάνης), two other primates, and the dragoman. In exceptional cases of major import, local notables were also called to attend its sessions.

=== Administrative divisions ===
According to Evliya, at the time of his visit the eyalet comprised the sanjaks of Misistire, Aya Maura (Lefkada), Aynabahti (Lepanto), Karli-Eli, Manya (Mani Peninsula) and Ballibadra (Patras), i.e. it encompassed also the portions of western and central Continental Greece.

At the beginning of the 19th century, according to the French traveller François Pouqueville and the Austrian scholar Joseph von Hammer-Purgstall, the eyalet comprised the following sanjaks:

- Mora, i.e. the pasha-sanjak around the capital, Tripolitza
- Anavarin (Navarino)
- Arkadya (Kyparissia)
- Aynabahti
- Ballibadra (Patras)
- Gastuni (Gastouni)
- Messalonghi (Missolonghi)
- Kordos, but by the time of Pouqueville's visit with Anaboli as capital
- Koron
- Misistire
- Moton (Modon)
- Pirgos (Pyrgos)

Throughout both Ottoman periods, Morea was also divided into a number of smaller districts (kazas, kadiluks or beyliks), whose number varied but was usually between 22 and 25, and reached 27 by 1784. In the mid-17th century, when the Morea was still a sanjak, these were, according to Hajji Khalifa: Kordos, Arhos (Argos), Anaboli, Firina, Ayapetri (Agios Petros), Ruya, Manya (de facto free of Ottoman control), Kalavrita (Kalavryta), Kartina (Karytaina), Londari, Andrusa (Androusa), Koron, Motun, Anavarin, Arkadya (Kyparissia), Fanar (Fanari), Holomiç (Chlemoutsi), Voştiçe (Aigio), Ballibadra/Balye Badre. In addition, Misistra, Menceşe (Monemvasia) and Kalamata belonged to the sanjak of Misistire/Mezistre.

== Sources ==
- Bées, N.A. & Savvides, A. (1993). "Mora". In Bosworth, C. E.; van Donzel, E.; Heinrichs, W. P. & Pellat, Ch. (eds.). The Encyclopaedia of Islam, Second Edition. Volume VII: Mif–Naz. Leiden: E. J. Brill. pp. 236–241. ISBN 978-90-04-09419-2.
- Birken, Andreas [in German] (1976). Die Provinzen des Osmanischen Reiches [The Provinces of the Ottoman Empire]. Beihefte zum Tübinger Atlas des Vorderen Orients, 13 (in German). Reichert. ISBN 3-920153-56-1.
- Evliya Çelebi (2005). Εβλιγιά Τσελεμπί: Οδοιπορικό στην Ελλάδα (1668 - 1671) [Evliya Çelebi: Travels in Greece (1668 - 1671)] (in Greek). transl. by D. Loupis. Athens: Ekati. ISBN 960-7437-07-1.
- Fotopoulos, Athanasios Th. (2005). Οι κοτζαμπάσηδες της Πελοποννήσου κατά τη δεύτερη τουρκοκρατία (1715-1821) [The Kodjabashis of the Peloponnese during the Second Turkish Rule (1715–1821)] (in Greek). Athens: Irodotos. ISBN 978-960-825646-0.
- Kazhdan, Alexander, ed. (1991). The Oxford Dictionary of Byzantium. Oxford and New York: Oxford University Press. ISBN 0-19-504652-8.
- Zarinebaf, Fariba; Bennet, John; Davis, Jack L. (2005). A Historical and Economic Geography of Ottoman Greece: The Southwestern Morea in the 18th Century. Hesperia Supplement 34. The American School of Classical Studies at Athens. ISBN 0-87661-534-5.
