= Rumelia Eyalet =

1365–1867 Ottoman province in the Balkans

Eyalet of Rumelia Eyalet-i Rumeli
- 1365–1867
- Flag of Rumelia

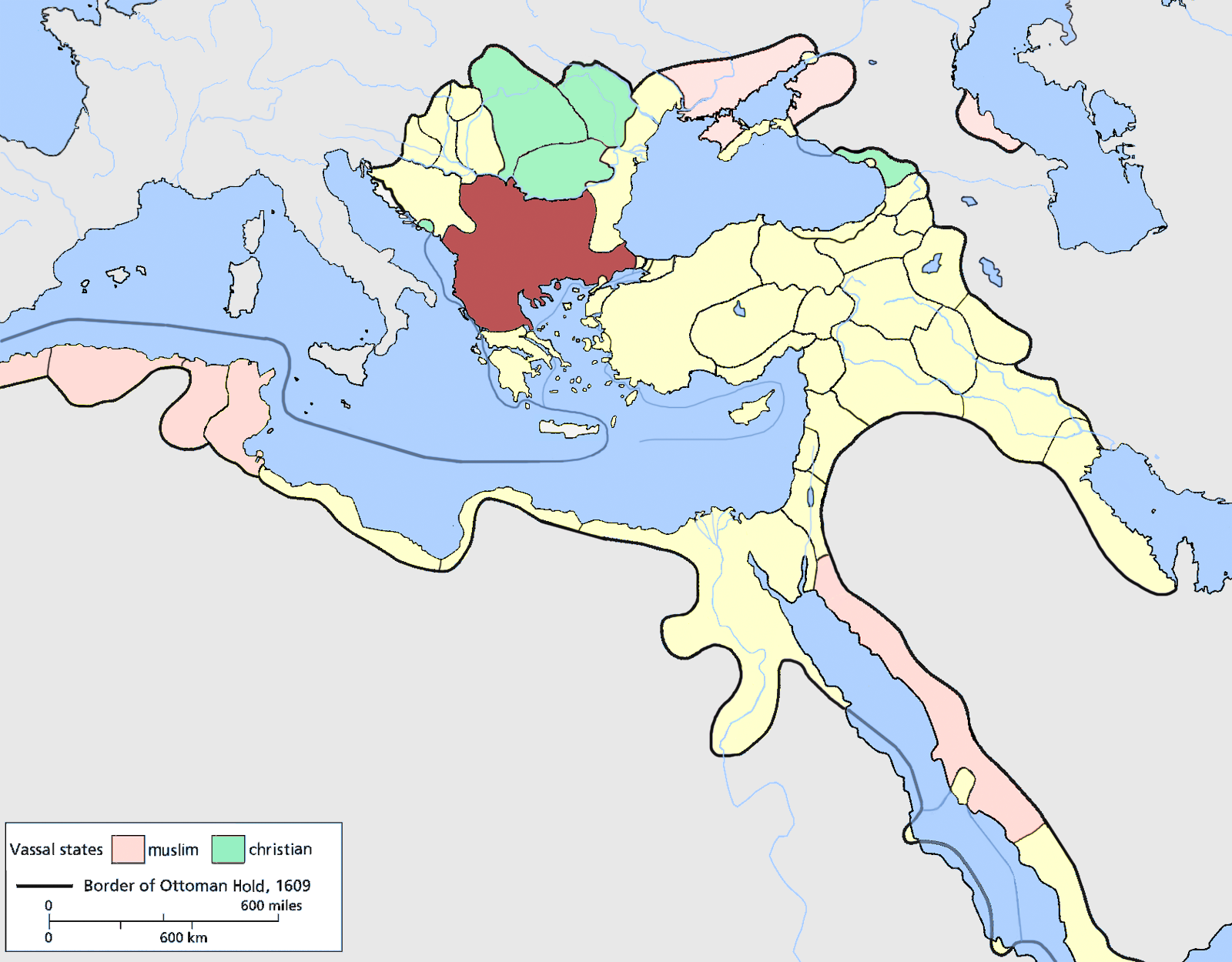
- The Rumelia Eyalet in 1609
- Status: Eyalet of the Ottoman Empire
- Capital: Edirne (1362–1530); Sofia (1530–1836); Monastir (1836–1867); 41°1′N 21°20′E
- History
  - Established: 1365
  - Disestablished: 1867

Area
- 1844: 124,630 km^{2} (48,120 sq mi)

Population
  - 1844: 2,700,000
Preceded by
Byzantine Empire
Despotate of the Morea
Second Bulgarian Empire
Despotate of Serbia
Despotate of Dobruja
Lordship of Prilep
Gazaria (Genoese colonies)
Principality of Theodoro
Kingdom of Bosnia
League of Lezhë
Venetian Albania
Latinokratia
Kingdom of Hungary
Succeeded by
Eyalet of the Archipelago
Kefe Eyalet
Bosnia Eyalet
Ioannina Eyalet
Principality of Serbia
Salonica Eyalet
Adrianople Eyalet
Silistra Eyalet
Niš Eyalet
Vidin Eyalet
Habsburg Monarchy

The Eyalet of Rumeli, or Eyalet of Rumelia (Ottoman Turkish: ایالت روم ایلی, romanized: Eyālet-i Rūm-ėli), known as the Beylerbeylik of Rumeli until 1591, was a first-level province (beylerbeylik or eyalet) of the Ottoman Empire encompassing most of the Balkans ("Rumelia"). For most of its history, it was the largest and most important province of the Empire, containing key cities such as Edirne, Yanina (Ioannina), Sofia, Filibe (Plovdiv), Manastır/Monastir (Bitola), Üsküp (Skopje), and the major seaport of Selânik/Salonica (Thessaloniki). It was also among the oldest Ottoman eyalets, lasting more than 500 years with several territorial restructurings over the long course of its existence.

The capital was in Adrianople (Edirne), Sofia, and finally Monastir (Bitola). Its reported area in an 1862 almanac was 48,119 square miles (124,630 km^{2}).

== History ==
Initially termed beylerbeylik or generically vilayet ("province") of Rumeli, only after 1591 was the term eyalet used.

The first beylerbey of Rumelia was Lala Shahin Pasha, who was awarded the title by Sultan Murad I as a reward for his capture of Adrianople (Edirne) in the 1360s, and given military authority over the Ottoman territories in Europe, which he governed effectively as the Sultan's deputy while the Sultan returned to Anatolia. Also, Silistra Eyalet was formed in 1593.

From its foundation, the province of Rumelia encompassed the entirety of the Ottoman Empire's European possessions, including the trans-Danubian conquests like Akkerman, until the creation of further eyalets in the 16th century, beginning with the Archipelago (1533), Budin (1541) and Bosnia (1580).

The first capital of Rumelia was probably Edirne (Adrianople), which was also, until the Fall of Constantinople in 1453, the Ottomans' capital city. It was followed by Sofia for a while and again by Edirne until 1520, when Sofia once more became the seat of the beylerbey. At the time, the beylerbey of Rumelia was the commander of the most important military force in the state in the form of the timariot sipahi cavalry, and his presence in the capital during this period made him a regular member of the Imperial Council (divan). For the same reason, powerful Grand Viziers like Mahmud Pasha Angelovic or Pargalı Ibrahim Pasha held the beylerbeylik in tandem with the grand vizierate.

In the 18th century, Monastir emerged as an alternate residence of the governor, and in 1836, it officially became the capital of the eyalet. At about the same time, the Tanzimat reforms, aimed at modernizing the Empire, split off the new eyalets of Üsküb, Yanya and Selanik and reduced the Rumelia Eyalet to a few provinces around Monastir. The rump eyalet survived until 1867, when, as part of the transition to the more uniform vilayet system, it became part of the Salonica Vilayet.

Eastern Rumelia became a new Ottoman province in 1878 (formally until 1908 but united to the Principality of Bulgaria since 1885).

== Governors ==
The governor of the Rumelia Eyalet was titled "Beylerbey of Rumelia" (Rumeli beylerbeyi) or "Vali of Rumelia" (Rumeli vali).

Governor	Reign	Notes
Lala Shahin Pasha		the first beylerbey of Rumelia, the lala (tutor) of Murad I.
Timurtaş Bey	fl. 1385	
Süleyman Çelebi	before 1411	son of Bayezid I
Mihaloğlu Mehmed Bey	1411	Son of Köse Mihal, the advisor of Osman I.
Mustafa Bey	1421	
Hadım Şehabeddin	1439–42	Devshirme
Kasım Pasha	1443	
Ömer Bey	fl. 1453	
Turahan Bey	before 1456	Son of Pasha Yiğit Bey.
Mahmud Pasha	before 1456	Angelos family, Devshirme.
Ahmed	after 1456	
Hass Murad Pasha	c. 1469–1473	Palaiologos dynasty, devshirme.
Hadım Süleyman Pasha	c. 1475	Eunuch.
Koca Davud Pasha	c. 1478	Devshirme.
Sinan Pasha	c. 1481	
Mesih Pasha	after 1481	
Hasan Pasha	fl. 1514	
Hadım Sinan Pasha	fl. 1515	Previously beylerbey of Anatolia.
Ahmed Pasha	1519--fl. 1521-?	
Pargalı Ibrahim Pasha	1523-?	
Güzelce Kasım Pasha	c. 1527	
Khusrow Pasha	June 1538–?	
Kara Ahmed Pasha	fl. 1543	Former Agha of the Janissaries, married daughter of Sultan Selim I.
Ali Pasha	fl. 1546	
Sokollu Mehmed Pasha	fl. 1551	Devshirme who rose through military distinction.
Şemsi Ahmed Pasha	1564 – 1569	Candar dynasty member who grew up in Topkapı and served Suleiman.
Doğancı Mehmed Pasha		
Osman Yeğen Pasha	1687	Sekban commander who was elevated by Mehmed IV through threats of rebellion.
Sari Ahmed Pasha	1714–1715	
Topal Osman Pasha	1721–27, 1729–30, 1731	Kapıcıbaşı who rose further due to military distinction.
Hadji Mustafa Pasha	summer of 1797–?	Appointed to deal with Osman Pazvantoglu, but failed and was dismissed.
Ahmed Kamil Pasazade Hakki Pasha		
Hakki Pasha	fl. August 1801	
Ali Pasha	28 January 1803–1804	Powerful Pasha in Ioannina.
Veli Pasha	1804–	Son of Ali Pasha.
Hurshid Pasha	fl. 1808	
Marashli Ali Pasha	fl. 1815	
Köse Ahmed Zekeriya Pasha	1836–March 1840	
Mehmed Dilaver Pasha	May–July 1840	
Yusuf Muhlis Pasha Serezli	July 1840–February 1842	
Yakub Pasha Kara Osmanzade		
Mustafa Nuri Paşa, Sırkatibi		
Mehmed Said Paşa, Mirza/Tatar		
Mehmed Ziyaeddin Paşa, Mezarcızade		
Ömer Paşa, Kızılhisarlı
Mehmed Ziyaeddin Paşa, Mezarcızade
Mehmed Emin Pasha
Asaf Pasha
Mehmed Reşid Paşa, Boşnakzade
Ömer Paşa, Kızılhisarlı (2nd term)
Mehmed Hurshid Pasha Arnavud
Ahmed Nazır Paşa
İsmail Paşa, Çerkes
Abdülkerim Nadir Paşa, Çırpanlı
Ali Paşa, Hacı, Kütahyalı/Germiyanoğlu
Hüseyin Hüsnü Paşa
Mehmed Tevfik Paşa, Taşcızade

== Administrative divisions ==
=== 1475 ===
A list dated to 1475 lists seventeen subordinate sanjakbeys, who controlled sub-provinces or sanjaks, which also functioned as military commands:

1. Constantinople
2. Gallipoli
3. Edirne
4. Nikebolu/Nigbolu
5. Vidin
6. Sofia
7. Serbia (Laz-ili)
8. Serbia (Despot-ili)
9. Vardar (under the Evrenosoğullari)
10. Üsküb
11. Arnavut-ili (under Iskender Bey, i.e. Skanderbeg)
12. Arnavut-ili (under the Arianiti family)
13. Bosnia
14. Bosnia (under Stephen)
15. Arta, Zituni and Athens
16. Morea
17. Monastir

=== 1520s ===
Another list, dating to the early reign of Suleiman the Magnificent (r. 1520–1566), lists the sanjakbeys of that period, in approximate order of importance.:

1. Bey of the Pasha-sanjak
2. Bosnia
3. Morea
4. Semendire
5. Vidin
6. Hersek
7. Silistre
8. Ohri
9. Avlonya
10. Iskenderiyye
11. Yanya
12. Gelibolu
13. Köstendil
14. Nikebolu
15. Sofia
16. Inebahti
17. Tirhala
18. Alaca Hișar
19. Vulcetrin
20. Kefe
21. Prizren
22. Karli-eli
23. Ağriboz
24. Çirmen
25. Vize
26. Izvornik
27. Florina
28. Elbasan
29. Sanjakbey of the Çingene ("Gypsies")
30. Midilli
31. Karadağ (Montenegro)
32. Sanjakbey of the Müselleman-i Kirk Kilise ("Muslims of Kirk Kilise")
33. Sanjakbey of the Voynuks

The Çingene, Müselleman-i Kirk Kilise and Voynuks were not territorial circumscriptions, but rather represented merely a sanjakbey appointed to control these scattered and often nomadic groups, and who acted as the commander of the military forces recruited among them. The Pasha-sanjak in this period comprised a wide area in western Macedonia, including the towns of Üskub (Skopje), Pirlipe (Prilep), Manastir (Bitola) and Kesriye (Kastoria).

A similar list compiled c. 1534 gives the same sanjaks, except for the absence of Sofia, Florina and Inebahti (among the provinces transferred to the new Archipelago Eyalet in 1533), and the addition of Selanik (Salonica).

=== 1538 ===
In 1538 there are listed 29 liva (sanjaks) during the reign of Sultan Suleiman I.

1. Sofya (Pasha Sanjak of Rumelia)
2. Ağrıboz
3. Alacahisar
4. Avlonya
5. Bosna
6. Çirmen
7. Gelibolu
8. Hersek
9. İlbasan
10. İskenderiye
11. İzvornik
12. Karlıili
13. Kefe
14. Köstendil
15. Mora
16. Niğbolu
17. Ohri
18. Prizrin
19. Rodos
20. Semendire
21. Silistre
22. Tırhala
23. Vidin
24. Vize
25. Vulçıtrın
26. Yanya
27. Müselleman-ı Kızılca
28. Müselleman-ı Çingane
29. Voynugan-ı Istabl-ı Amire

=== 1644 ===
Further sanjaks were removed with the progressive creation of new eyalets, and an official register from c. 1644 records only fifteen sanjaks for the Rumelia Eyalet:

1. Köstendil
2. Tirhala
3. Prizren
4. Yanya
5. Delvine
6. Vulcetrin
7. Üskub
8. Elbasan
9. Avlonya
10. Dukagin
11. Iskenderiyye
12. Ohri
13. Alaca Hișar
14. Selanik
15. Voynuks

=== 1700/1730 ===
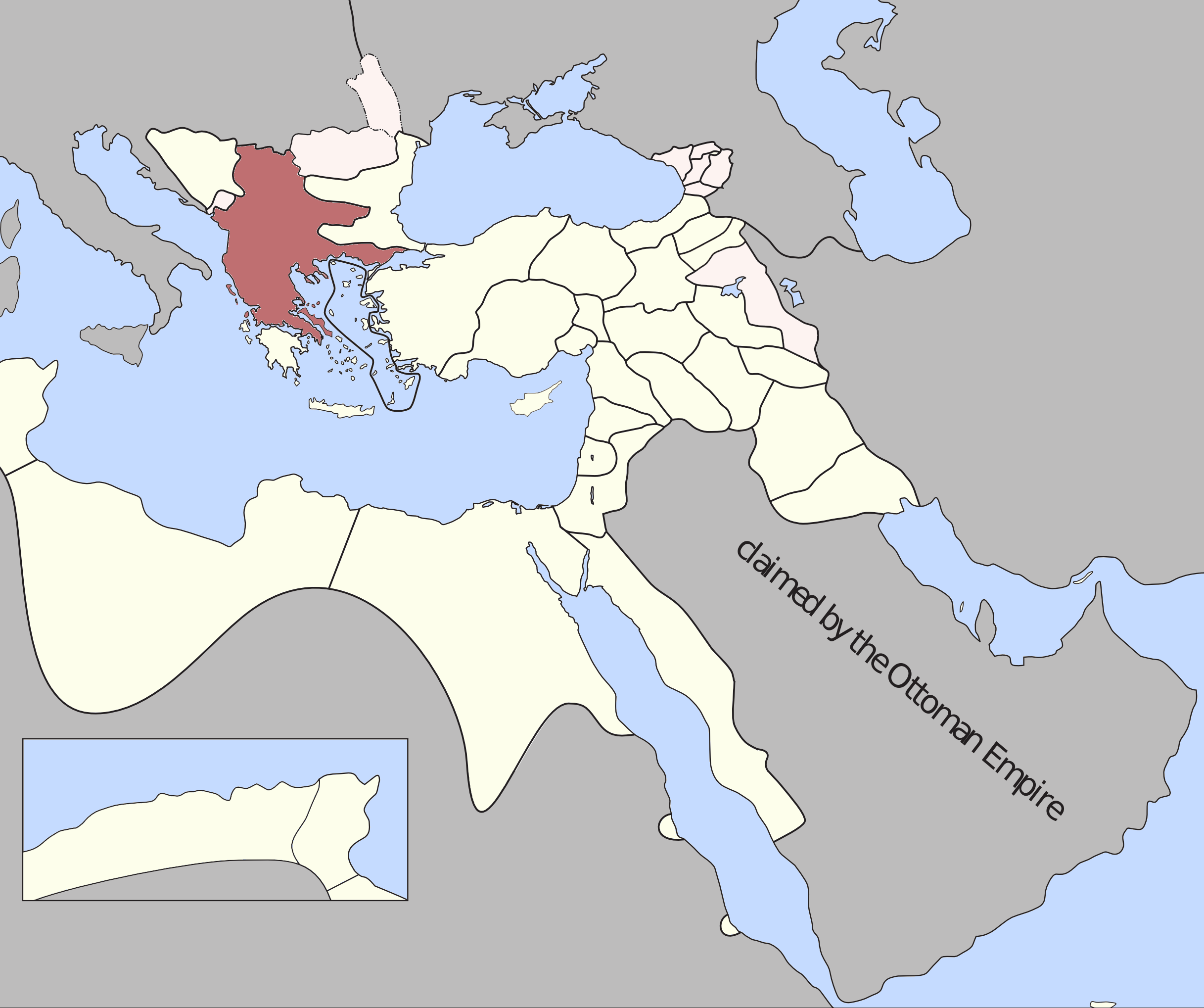
The Rumelia Eyalet in 1795

The administrative division of the beylerbeylik of Rumelia between 1700–1730 was as follows:

1. Pasha-sanjak, around Manastir
2. Köstendil
3. Tirhala
4. Yanya
5. Delvina
6. Elbasan
7. Iskenderiyye
8. Avlonya
9. Ohri
10. Alaca Hisar
11. Selanik
12. Dukagin
13. Prizren
14. Üsküb
15. Vulçıtrin
16. Voynuks
17. Çingene
18. Yoruks

=== Early 19th century ===
Sanjaks in the early 19th century:

1. Manastir
2. Selanik
3. Tirhala
4. Iskenderiyye
5. Ohri
6. Avlonya
7. Köstendil
8. Elbasan
9. Prizren
10. Dukagin
11. Üsküb
12. Delvina
13. Vulcetrin
14. Kavala
15. Alaca Hișar
16. Yanya
17. Smederevo

=== Mid-19th century ===
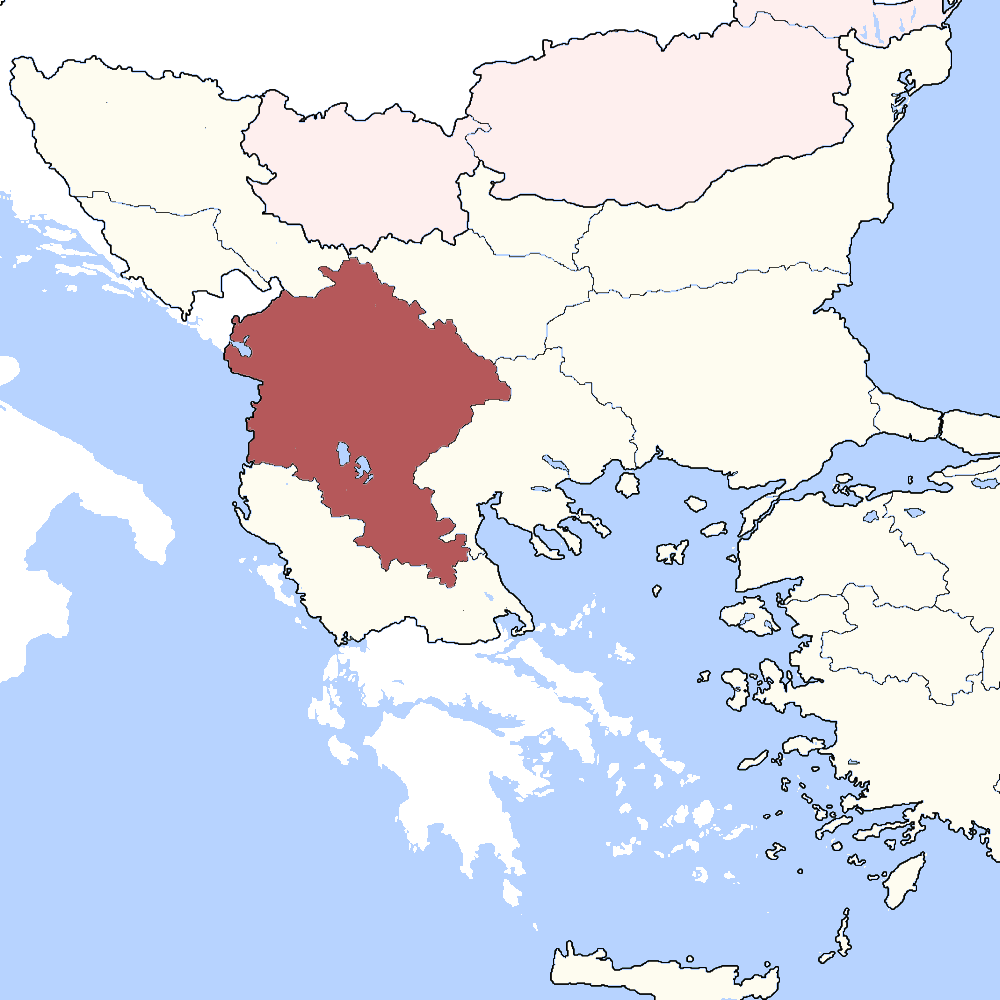
The reduced eyalet in the 1850s

According to the state yearbook (salname) of the year 1847, the reduced Rumelia Eyalet, centred at Manastir, encompassed also the sanjaks of Iskenderiyye (Scutari), Ohri (Ohrid) and Kesrye (Kastoria). In 1855, according to the French traveller A. Viquesnel, it comprised the sanjaks of Iskenderiyye, with 7 kazas or sub-provinces, Ohri with 8 kazas, Kesrye with 8 kazas and the pasha-sanjak of Manastir with 11 kazas.

== Bibliography ==
- Babinger, Franz (1992) [1978]. Hickman, William C. (ed.). Mehmed the Conqueror and His Time. Translated by Manheim, Ralph. Princeton University Press. ISBN 978-0-691-01078-6.
- Ćorović, Vladimir (2001) [1997]. "Početak ustanka u Srbiji". Istorija srpskog naroda. Ars Libri.
- Jefferson, John (2012). The Holy Wars of King Wladislas and Sultan Murad: The Ottoman-Christian Conflict from 1438-1444. BRILL. p. 84. ISBN 978-90-04-21904-5.
- Setton, Kenneth M. (1984a). The Papacy and the Levant (1204–1571), Volume IV: The Sixteenth Century from Julius III to Pius V. Vol. 4. Philadelphia: The American Philosophical Society. ISBN 0-87169-162-0.
- Ágoston, Gábor; Masters, Bruce, eds. (2009). Encyclopedia of the Ottoman Empire. New York, NY: Facts On File. ISBN 9780816062591.
