= 1915 in the Ottoman Empire =

- Decades: 1890s; 1900s; 1910s; 1920s
- See also: Other events of 1915; List of years in the Ottoman Empire

The following lists events that happened during 1915 in the Ottoman Empire.

== Incumbents ==
- Sultan: Mehmed V
- Grand Vizier: Said Halim Pasha

== Events ==
=== April ===
- April 24 - The deportation of Armenian notables from Constantinople, beginning the Armenian genocide.
- April 25 - Start of the Gallipoli campaign; Landing at Anzac Cove by Australian and New Zealand Army Corps and landing at Cape Helles by British and French troops to begin the Allied invasion of the Gallipoli peninsula in the Ottoman Empire.
