= Sanjak of Sakız =

Province of the Ottoman Empire

Sanjak of Sakız Liva-i Sakız/Sancak-ı Sakız (Ottoman Turkish)
- Sanjak of the Ottoman Empire
- 1566–1912
- Flag
- Capital: Chios
- History
  - Ottoman conquest: 1566
  - Captured by Greece and Italy: 1912
Preceded by
Maona of Chios and Phocaea
Succeeded by
Kingdom of Greece
Free State of Icaria
Italian Islands of the Aegean
- Today part of: Greece

The Sanjak of Sakız or Chios (Greek: Σαντζάκι Χίου) was a second-level Ottoman province (sanjak or liva) centred on the eastern Aegean island of Chios. Its Turkish name, Sakız, derived from the island's most distinctive product, gum mastic.

== History ==
A possession of the Genoese Maona company since 1346, Chios (and its attendant islets of Psara and Oinousses) was conquered without resistance by the Ottoman Empire in 1566, as a recompense for the failure to capture Malta the previous year, and annexed as a sanjak of the Eyalet of the Archipelago.

With the exception of a Florentine attack in 1599, a brief occupation by the Venetians in 1694–1695 during the Morean War, and Russian activities in the area during the Russo-Turkish War of 1768–1774, the island remained a peaceful province until the outbreak of the Greek War of Independence. During this time, its role as a major commercial hub and the main point of export for Anatolian goods (a role it held until eclipsed by the mainland port city of Smyrna in the 17th century), as well as its unique production of the gum mastic (which was much prized by the ladies of the Sultan's harem), secured it great prosperity. The island's population was mostly Greek Orthodox, with a few Genoese-descended Catholics, whose power was much diminished after the Venetian occupation; the Turkish presence was limited to the governor and his administrators, as well as a garrison of ca. 2,000 troops.

Chios was devastated in the infamous Chios Massacre in 1822, when rouge Ottoman forces invaded the island, which had not joined the Greek rebellion against the Empire, and slaughtered or sold into slavery about half of its 80,000 inhabitants. Nevertheless, the island recovered a modicum of its former prosperity and retained extensive autonomy after the Greek War of Independence ended, until the Ottoman administrative reforms of 1866 transformed it into a more regular province within the Vilayet of the Archipelago. Between 1880 and 1887, Chios even served as the capital of the Vilayet of the Archipelago.

In 1912, the Sanjak of Sakız encompassed the kazas (districts) of Sakız itself, Kilimli (Kalymnos), İleryoz (Leros) and Ahikerya (Ikaria). The latter, the northernmost islands of the Dodecanese group, were seized by the Italians in summer 1912 during the Italo-Turkish War, while Chios itself was captured by the Greeks in November–December 1912, during the First Balkan War.
