= Eyalet of the Archipelago =

Administrative division of the Ottoman Empire from 1533 to 1864

Eyalet of the Islands of the White Sea ایالت جزایر بحر سفید (Ottoman Turkish) Eyālet-i Cezāyir-i Baḥr-i Sefīd
- Eyalet of the Ottoman Empire
- 1533–1864
- Flag

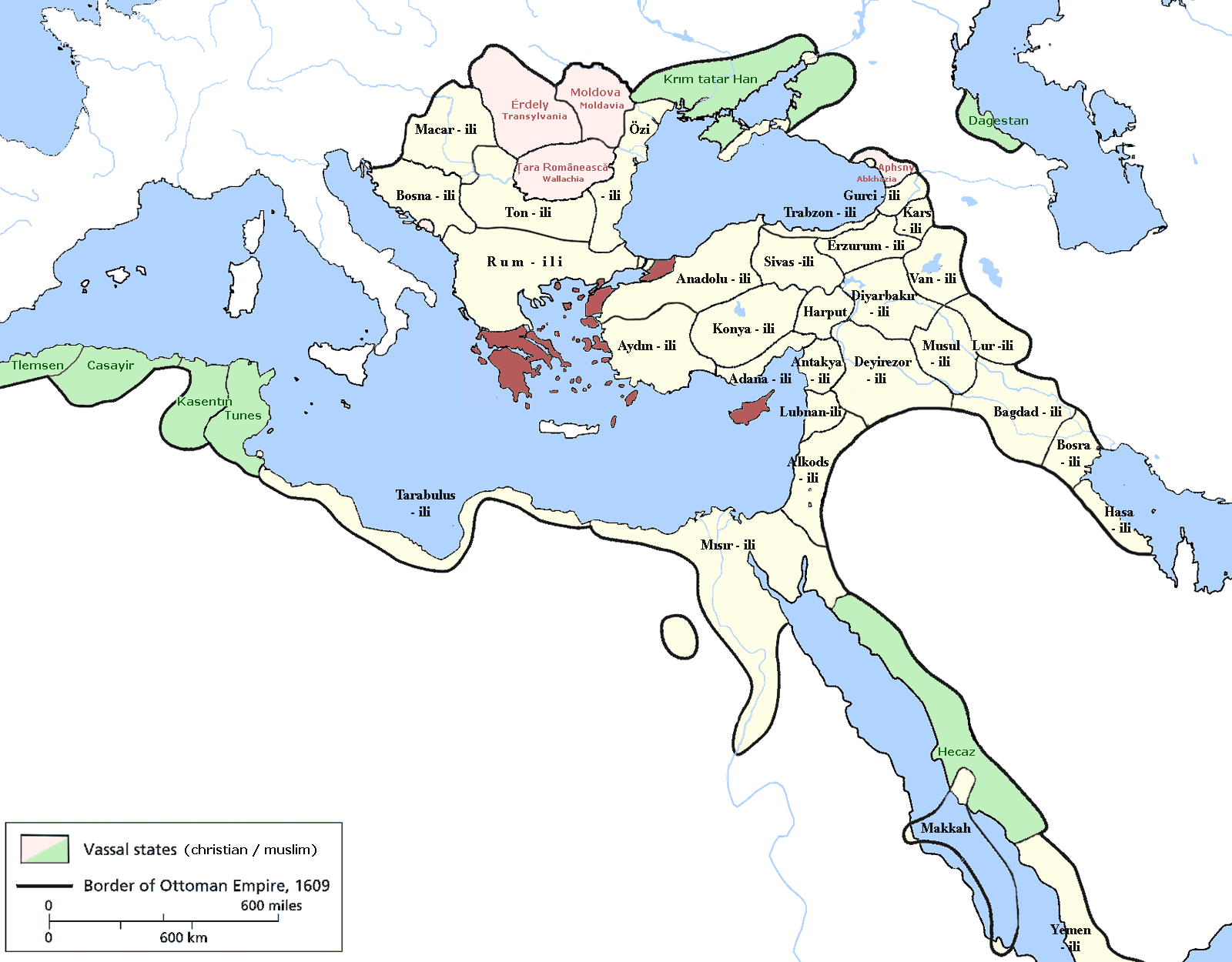
- The Eyalet of the Archipelago in 1609
- Capital: Gallipoli
- History
  - Established: 1533
  - Disestablished: 1864
Preceded by
Rumelia Eyalet
Anatolia Eyalet
Cyprus Eyalet
Succeeded by
Morea Eyalet
Military-Political System of Samos
First Hellenic Republic
Vilayet of the Archipelago
Edirne Eyalet
- Today part of: Turkey; Greece; Cyprus

The Eyalet of the Islands of the White Sea (Ottoman Turkish: ایالت جزایر بحر سفید, romanized: Eyālet-i Cezāyir-i Baḥr-i Sefīd, lit. 'Eyalet of the Islands of the White Sea') was a first-level province (eyalet) of the Ottoman Empire. From its inception until the Tanzimat reforms of the mid-19th century, it was under the personal control of the Kapudan Pasha, the commander-in-chief of the Ottoman Navy.

== History ==
During the early period of the Ottoman Empire, the commander of the Ottoman fleet (the Derya Begi, "Bey of the Sea") also held the governorship of the sanjak of Gallipoli, which was the principal Ottoman naval base until the construction of the Imperial Arsenal under Sultan Selim I (reigned 1512–20). His province also included the isolated kazas of Galata and Izmit.

In 1533/4, the corsair captain Hayreddin Barbarossa, who had taken over Algeria, submitted to the authority of Sultan Suleyman I (r. 1520–66). His province was expanded by the addition of the sanjaks of Kocaeli, Suğla, and Biga from the Eyalet of Anatolia, and of the sanjaks of Inebahti (Naupaktos), Ağriboz (Euboea), Karli-eli (Aetolia-Acarnania), Mezistre (Mystras), and Midilli (Lesbos) from the Eyalet of Rumelia, thus forming the Eyalet of the Archipelago. After Hayreddin's death, the province remained the domain of the Kapudan Pasha, the new title of the commander-in-chief of the navy, a position of great power and prestige: its holder was a vizier of three horsetails and a member of the Imperial Council. As a token of this, the title of the local sub-provincial governors was not sanjak-bey but derya-bey. Although the Kapudan Pashas resided in the Imperial Arsenal, Gallipoli remained the official capital (pasha-sanjak) until the 18th century.

After Hayreddin's death in 1546, the sanjak of Rodos (Rhodes) also became part of the Eyalet of the Archipelago, and in 1617/8 the sanjaks of Sakız (Chios), Nakşa (Naxos) and Andıra (Andros) were added to it. Algeria became de facto independent of Ottoman control after 1642, and in ca. 1670 Cyprus was added to the eyalet. It was detached in 1703 as the personal fief (hass) of the Grand Vizier, but returned to the eyalet in 1784. Under Merzifonlu Kara Mustafa Pasha, the sanjaks of Mezistre and Karli-eli were detached and incorporated in the new Eyalet of the Morea. Alone among the major Aegean islands, Crete, although conquered from the Republic of Venice in 1645–69, was never subordinated to the Eyalet of the Archipelago. From 1701–1821, the office of the Dragoman of the Fleet, entrusted to a Phanariote Greek, served as intermediary between the Kapudan Pasha and the autonomous communities of the Aegean islands. In this area, the Dragoman of the Fleet enjoyed considerable authority.

By the early 19th century, the eyalet was reduced to the sanjaks of Biga (now the pasha-sanjak, its centre was moved to Kale-i Sultaniye in 1855), Gelibolu, Rodos, Sakız, Midilli, Limni (Lemnos) and Cyprus. Sanjak of Gelibolu became part of Edirne Eyalet in 1846. As part of the Tanzimat reforms, its ties to the Kapudan Pasha were severed in 1849, and it became the Vilayet of the Archipelago after 1867. Sanjak of Biga was part of Hüdavendigâr Eyalet between 1 January 1847 and 31 December 1868 and 1 January 1872 and 1873 before reverting to this province during periods of 1869-1871 and 1873-1877. Sanjak of Biga broken ties with her after transferring to Şehremaneti (Its centre was Istanbul in 1877. The island of Samos (Turkish Sisam), which was an autonomous principality since 1832, continued to be counted as a sanjak of the eyalet until 1867. Cyprus was lost to British control in 1878, and the remainder of the vilayet was dissolved after the eastern Aegean islands were conquered by the Italians during the Italo-Turkish War (1911–12) and the Greeks in the First Balkan War (1912–13).

Including Crete, its reported area in the 19th century was 9,829 square miles (25,460 km^{2}) and its population around 700,000.

== Other names ==
The eyalet's English names are the Province of the Islands or of the Archipelago. Because it was commanded by the Kapudan Pasha, the head of the Ottoman navy, it was also known as the Province of the Kapudan Pasha (Ottoman Turkish: Kapudanlık-ı Derya, "Captaincy of the Sea").

=== Dejezayr Bahr-i-Rum ===
The Ottoman 'Vilâyet Djezayr Bahr-i-Sefid' for the islands was derived from an old Arabic name 'Djezayr Bahr-i-Rum' (جزائر بحر الروم), Province of Djezayrs or Dschesair, the Province of the Islands of the Archipelago, the Province of the Islands of the White Sea, and the Eyalet of the Mediterranean Islands.

== Administrative divisions ==
According to 1550-1551 Sancak Tevcih Defteri
1. Sanjak of Gallipoli
2. Sanjak of Eğriboz
3. Sanjak of Karlı-ili
4. Sanjak of İnebahtı
5. Sanjak of Rhodes
6. Sanjak of Midillü

According to Leunclavius (1588):
1. Sanjak of Gallipoli
2. Galata
3. Izmit
4. Sanjak of Lemnos
5. Sanjak of Midilli
6. Sanjak of Sakız
7. Sanjak of Nakşa Berre
8. Sanjak of Ağriboz
9. Sanjak of Rhodes
10. Sanjak of Kavala
11. Sanjak of Anabolu
12. Sanjak of İnebahtı
13. Aya Maura
14. Alexandria
Sanjaks of the eyalet in the 17th century:
1. Sanjak of Gelibolu (Gallipoli)
2. Sanjak of Ağriboz (Negropont)
3. Sanjak of Karlıeli (Aetolia-Acarnania)
4. Sanjak of İnebahtı (Naupactus)
5. Sanjak of Rodos (Rhodes)
6. Sanjak of Midilli (Mytilene)
7. Sanjak of Biga (Biga)
8. Sanjak of Kocaeli
9. İzmit
10. İzmir
Between 1688 and 1702:
1. Sanjak of Gelibolu (Gallipoli)
2. Sanjak of Rodos (Rhodes)
3. Sanjak of Değirmenilk ve Mesentûri (Milos)
4. Sanjak of Andıra (Andros)
5. Sanjak of Senturin (Santorini)
6. Sanjak of Nakşa Berre (Naxos)
7. Sanjak of Limni (Lemnos)
8. Sanjak of Kavala (Kavala)
9. Sanjak of Midilli (Lesbos) with Eskerüs (Skyros)
10. Sanjak of Sakız (Chios)
11. Sanjak of Mezistre (Mystras)
12. Sanjak of Karlıeli (Aetolia-Acarnania)
13. Sanjak of İnebahtı (Naupactus)
14. Sanjak of İskenderiyye (Alexandria)
15. Sanjak of Dimyad (Damietta) with Reşîd (Rosetta)
Between 1717 and 1730:
1. Sanjak of Gelibolu (Gallipoli)
2. Sanjak of Kavala (Kavala)
3. Sanjak of Ağriboz (Negropont)
4. Sanjak of İnebahtı (Naupactus)
5. Sanjak of Sığla or Suğla (Ayasuluğ, absent)
6. Sanjak of Kocaeli (İzmit)
7. Sanjak of Karlıeli (Aetolia-Acarnania)
Between 1731 and 1740:
1. Sanjak of Gelibolu (Gallipoli)
2. Sanjak of Değirmenlik ve Mesentûri (Milos, absent)
3. Sanjak of Sığla or Suğla (Ayasuluğ, absent)
4. Sanjak of Karlıeli (Aetolia-Acarnania)
5. Sanjak of Senturin (Santorini, absent)
6. Sanjak of Nakşa Berre (Naxos, absent)
7. Sanjak of Kavala (Kavala)
8. Sanjak of Ağriboz (Negropont)
9. Sanjak of İnebahtı (Naupactus)
10. Sanjak of Mora (Nafplion, muhassıllık)
11. Sanjak of Mezistre (Mystras, absent)
12. Sanjak of Kocaeli (İzmit)

== See also ==
- List of Kapudan Pashas
- List of Ottoman admirals
- The Eyalet of the Western Archipelago (Algiers), also held by the Kapudan Pashas
- The Byzantine naval themes: Cibyrrhaeot, Aegean Sea, and Samos
