= Sanjak of Gelibolu =

Second-level Ottoman province

Sanjak of Gelibolu Ottoman Turkish: Liva-i Gelibolu
- Sanjak of the Ottoman Empire
- 1376–1920
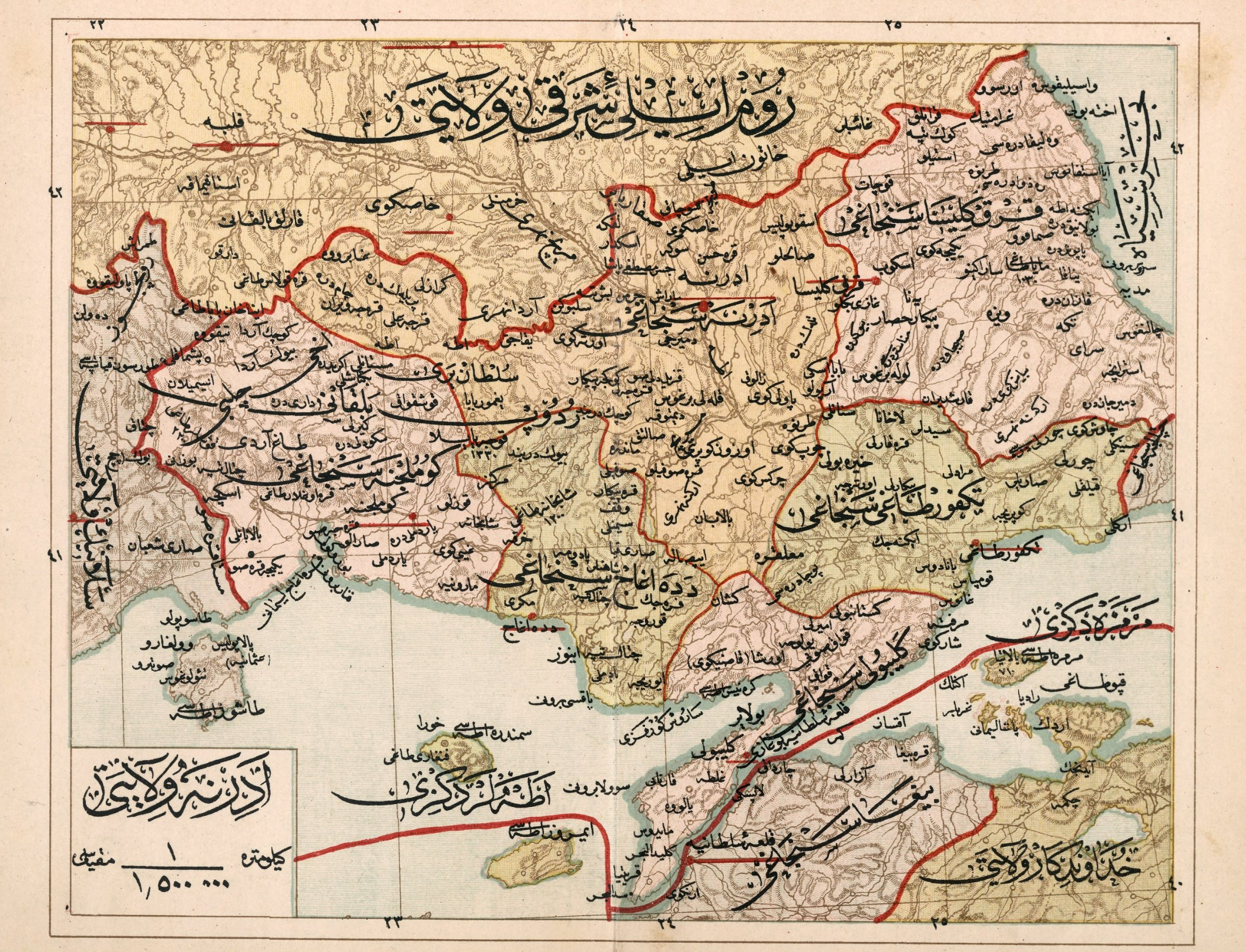
- 1907 Ottoman map of the Edirne Vilayet, including the Sanjak of Gelibolu in the bottom
- Capital: Gelibolu
- History
  - Ottoman conquest: 1376
  - Treaty of Sèvres: 1920
| Preceded by | Succeeded by |
| Byzantine Empire | Sanjak of Gümülcine; Kallipolis Prefecture |
- Today part of: Greece; Turkey

The Sanjak of Gelibolu or Gallipoli (Ottoman Turkish: Sancak-i/Liva-i Gelibolu) was a second-level Ottoman province (sanjak or liva) encompassing the Gallipoli Peninsula and a portion of southern Thrace. Gelibolu was the first Ottoman province in Europe, and for over a century the main base of the Ottoman Navy. Thereafter, and until the 18th century, it served as the seat of the Kapudan Pasha and capital of the Eyalet of the Archipelago.

== History ==
Gallipoli (from Ancient Greek: Καλλίπολις, Kallípolis; Ottoman Turkish: گلیبولو Gelibolu) was always a site of particular strategic importance, as it controlled the Dardanelles straits. Already under the Byzantine Empire, it served as a naval base. The Ottoman Turks first captured the strong fortress from the Byzantines in 1354, along with other sites in the area, aided by an earthquake that collapsed their walls. Gallipoli secured the Ottomans a toehold in the Balkans, and became the seat of the chief Ottoman governor in Rumelia. The fortress was recaptured for Byzantium by the Savoyard Crusade in 1366, but the beleaguered Byzantines were forced to hand it back in September 1376.

Gallipoli became the main crossing point for the Ottoman armies moving between Europe and Asia, protected by the Ottoman navy, which had its main base in the city. Sultan Bayezid I (r. 1389–1402) refortified Gallipoli and strengthened its walls and harbour defences, but initially, the weak Ottoman fleet remained incapable of fully controlling passage of the Dardanelles, especially when confronted by the Venetians. As a result, during the Ottoman–Venetian War (1463–1479) the straits' defences were strengthened by two new fortresses, and the Ottoman imperial arsenal was established in Istanbul itself. Gallipoli remained the main base of the Ottoman fleet until 1515, when it was moved to Istanbul. After this it began to lose its military importance, but remained a major commercial centre as the most important crossing-point between Asia and Europe.

From the second Ottoman conquest until 1533, Gallipoli was a sanjak of the Rumelia Eyalet. In 1533, the new Eyalet of the Archipelago, which included most of the coasts and islands of the Aegean Sea, was created for Hayreddin Barbarossa, the Ottoman Navy's Kapudan Pasha (قپودان پاشا, chief admiral), and Gallipoli became the seat and capital province (pasha-sanjak, پاشا سنجاق) of the Archipelago, until the 18th century, when the Kapudan Pasha moved his seat to Istanbul.

By 1846, the sanjak of Gallipoli became part of the Eyalet of Adrianople, and after 1864, as part of the wide-ranging vilayet (ولایت) reform, of the Adrianople Vilayet. Parts of the province were occupied by Bulgarian troops in the First Balkan War, but where recovered by the Ottomans in the Second Balkan War. During the First World War, it was the scene of the Gallipoli Campaign. After the war, the sanjak was briefly (1920–1922) occupied by Greece according to the provisions of the Treaty of Sèvres, and became a Greek prefecture. Following the Greek defeat in the Greco-Turkish War of 1919–1922, it returned to Turkey. Gallipoli was a province center between 1922 and 1926 with districts of Gelibolu, Eceabat, Keşan (also included present districts of İpsala and Enez as townships) and Şarköy before division between provinces of Çanakkale, Edirne and Tekirdağ.

== Administrative division ==
Originally the sanjak of Gallipoli included wide parts of southern Thrace, from Küçükçekmece on the outskirts of Istanbul to the mouths of the Strymon River, and initially even Galata and Izmid (Nicomedia). According to a register of 1600, its districts (nahiyes) were: Gelibolu and Evreşe, Lemnos, Tasoz (Thasos), Miğal-kara (Malkara) and Harala, Abri, Keşan, Ipsala, and Gümülcine (Komotini). The early 17th-century official Ayn-i Ali Efendi records that it contained 14 ziamets and 85 timars, while later in the same century the traveller Evliya Çelebi recorded 6 ziamets and 122 timars.

With the vilayet reform of 1864, the sanjak of Gallipoli comprised six kazas: Gelibolu, Şarköy, Ferecik (Feres), Keşan, Malkara and Enoz. With the detachment of the new Sanjak of Gümülcine in 1878, the sanjak was reduced in extent, and by World War I contained only three kazas: Keşan, Mürefte and Şarköy.
