= Aidin Eyalet =

Administrative division of the Ottoman Empire from 1827 to 1864

Eyalet-i Aydın
- Eyalet of the Ottoman Empire
- 1827–1864
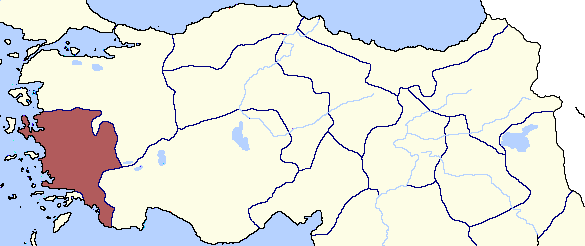
- The Eyalet of Aidin in 1861
- Capital: Aydın (1827-1841; 1843-1846); İzmir (1841-1843; 1846-1864)
- Area
  - Coordinates: 38.06°N 28.25°E
- History
  - Established: 1827
  - Disestablished: 1864
Preceded by	Succeeded by
Anatolia Eyalet	Aidin Vilayet
- Today part of: Turkey

The eyalet of Aidin, also known as eyalet of Smyrna or İzmir (Ottoman Turkish: ایالت آیدین; Eyālet-i Aydın) was an eyalet of the Ottoman Empire.

After the Janissary corps was abolished in 1826, the administrative divisions of the Empire were changed, and the Eyalet of Anatolia was divided into 4. In 1841, the capital was moved to İzmir, only to be moved back to Aydın in 1843. Three years later, in 1846, the capital was moved to İzmir once again. With the adoption of the vilayet law in 1864, the eyalet was re-created as the Vilayet of Smyrna.

== Administrative divisions ==
Sanjaks of the Eyalet in the mid-19th century:

1. Sanjak of Saruhan (Manisa)
2. Sanjak of Sığla (İzmir)
3. Sanjak of Aydın (Aydın)
4. Sanjak of Menteşe (Muğla)
5. Sanjak of Denizli (Denizli)
