= Vilayet of the Archipelago =

Province of the Ottoman Empire (1864–1913) in the Aegean Sea

Vilayet of the Archipelago ولايت جزائر بحر سفيد (Ottoman Turkish) Vilâyet-i Cezair-i Bahr-i Sefid
- Vilayet of the Ottoman Empire
- 1867–1913
- Flag Coat of arms

- The Vilayet of the Archipelago and the Vilayet of Crete in 1890
- Capital: Kale-i Sultaniye, Chios, Rhodes
- Area
  - 1885: 12,850 km^{2} (4,960 sq mi)
- Population
  - 1885: 325,866
- History
  - Vilayet Law: 1867
  - Disestablished: 1913
Preceded by
Eyalet of the Archipelago
Succeeded by
Kingdom of Greece
Italian Aegean Islands
British Cyprus
Hüdavendigâr vilayet

The Vilayet of the Archipelago (Ottoman Turkish: ولايت جزائر بحر سفيد, Vilâyet-i Cezair-i Bahr-i Sefid, "Vilayet of the Islands of the Mediterranean Sea") was a first-level administrative division (vilayet) of the Ottoman Empire extant from 1867 to 1912–13, including, at its maximum extent, the Ottoman Aegean islands, Cyprus and the Dardanelles Strait.

At the beginning of the 20th century, it reportedly had an area of 4,963 square miles (12,850 km^{2}), while the preliminary results of the first Ottoman census of 1885 (published in 1908) gave the population as 325,866. The accuracy of the population figures ranges from "approximate" to "merely conjectural" depending on the region from which they were gathered.

== History ==
It was established in 1867 as the successor of the homonymous "Eyalet of the Archipelago", which was established in 1533. Until 1876/7, when it was transferred to the Istanbul Vilayet, the sanjak (sub-province) of Biga was the capital (pasha-sanjak), with the seat of the governor at Kale-i Sultaniye, while the other sanjaks were those of Rodos (Rhodes), Midilli (Lesbos), Sakiz (Chios), Limni (Lemnos), and Kıbrıs (Cyprus).

Vilayet of the Archipelago (1881) Boundaries and Ethnic Makeup

Cyprus, which had been ruled as an independent mutasarrifate under the direct jurisdiction of the Porte since 1861, was included in the vilayet in April 1868, only to be made a separate mutasarrifate again after 1870. In 1878, Cyprus came under British rule. After the separation of Biga, Rhodes became pasha-sanjak, i.e. seat of the pasha and his court, then Chios in 1880, and then Rhodes again in 1888.

The Dodecanese islands were occupied by Italy during the Italo-Turkish War of 1911–12, and the remaining islands of the eastern Aegean were captured by Greece during the First Balkan War (1912–13), leading to the vilayet's dissolution. Of the Aegean islands, Imbros and Tenedos remained finally under Turkish rule according to the Treaty of Lausanne (1923), while the Dodecanese passed to Greece after World War II.

== Administrative divisions ==
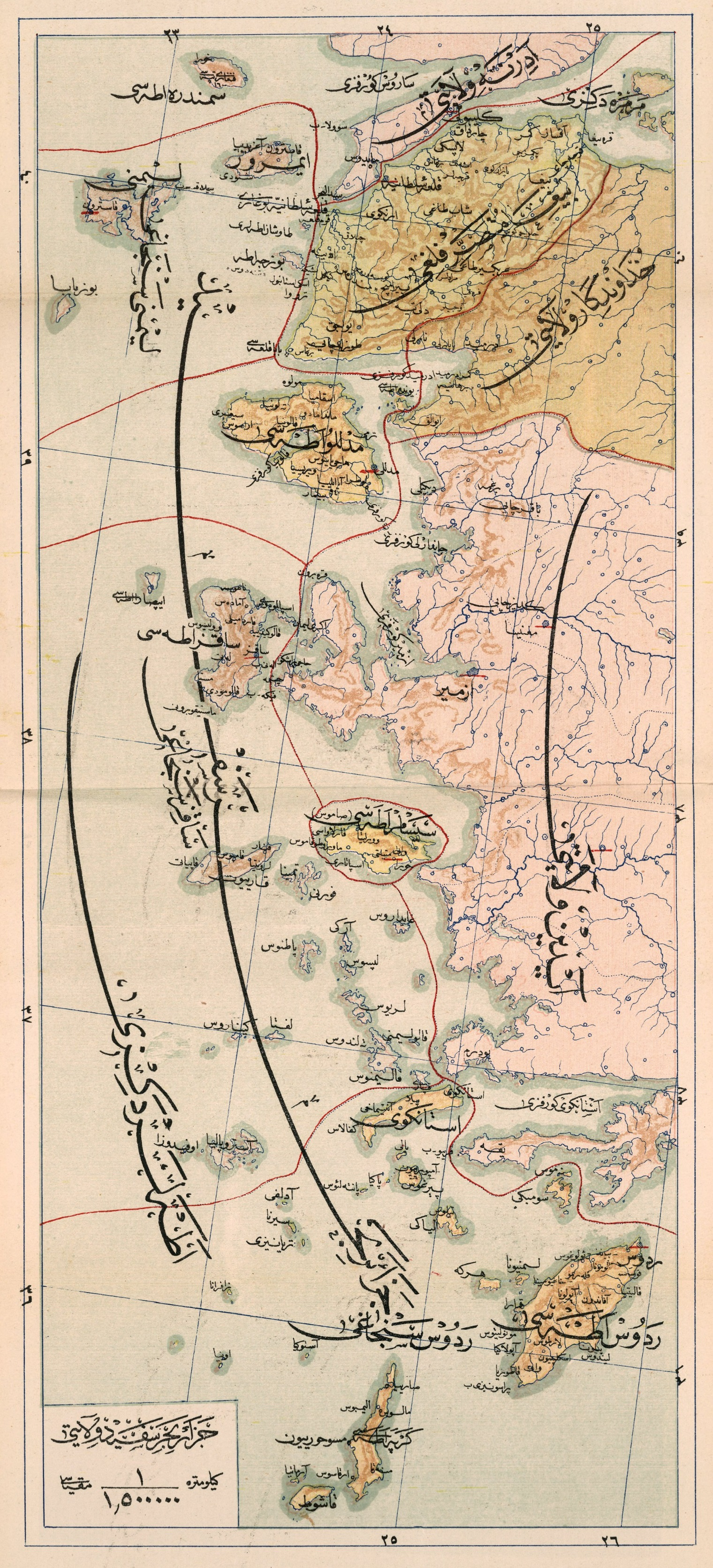
Map of subdivisions of Vilayet of the Archipelago in 1907

Sanjaks until 1876:

1. Sanjak of Biga (pasha-sanjak)
2. Sanjak of Rhodes
3. Sanjak of Midilli
4. Sanjak of Sakiz
5. Sanjak of Lemnos
6. Sanjak of Cyprus
