= Johannes Leunclavius =

German historian and orientalist (c. 1533/1541 – 1594)

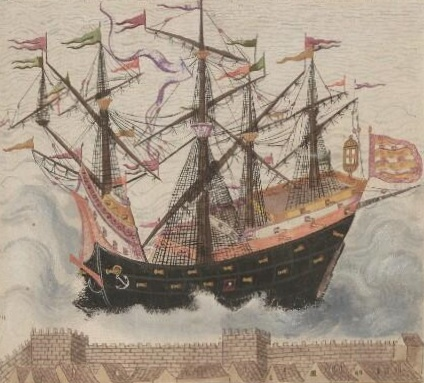
Four-masted Turkish warship, by Leunclavius (1586)

Johannes Leunclavius (c. 1533/1541 – 1594) was a German historian and orientalist. He was an expert in Turkish history, republishing and annotating Ottoman sources. He also edited Xenophon, Cassius Dio, and other classical authors.

He also published Historiae Musulmanae Turcorum, de monumentis ipsorum exscriptae, libri XVIII.

Leunclavius accompanied the nobleman Heinrich von Lichtenstein on a diplomatic mission to Istanbul, staying there from October 1584 to April 1585.

He was a friend of Friedrich Sylburg, who published his translation of Zosimus.
