= Kapudan Pasha =

Admiral of the navy of the Ottoman Empire

The Kapudan Pasha (Ottoman Turkish: قپودان پاشا, modern Turkish: Kaptan Paşa), also known as the Kapudan-ı Derya (Ottoman Turkish: قپودان دریا, modern: Kaptan-ı Derya, "Captain of the Sea") was the grand admiral of the Ottoman Navy. Typically, the Kapudan Pasha operated from a base at Galata and Gallipoli during the winter and conducted annual sailings during the summer months. The title of Kapudan Pasha itself is only attested from 1567 onwards; earlier designations for the supreme commander of the fleet include Derya Bey ("bey of the sea") and Re'is Kapudan ("head captain").

The Oxford English Dictionary regards the Ottoman Turkish word kapudan as a form of the Italian word capitano (English translation: "captain"); Ottoman Turkish pāšā or baša comes from Persian pādšāh – "padishah, protecting lord".

The title Derya Bey as an official rank within the Ottoman state structure originated during the reign of Bayezid I (r. 1389–1402). Following the 1453 conquest of Constantinople, Mehmed II raised Baltaoğlu Süleyman Bey to the status of sanjak bey for his efforts against the Byzantines in the Golden Horn. Baltaoğlu received the sanjak of Gallipoli (the principal Turkish naval base) and the kazas of Galata (until the conquest a Genovese colony) and of İzmit (whose tax remittance consisted of ship timber).

The success of Hayreddin Barbarossa (c. 1478-1546) saw the Kapudan Pasha elevated to the ranks of beylerbey and vizier in 1535, with his territories expanded into the Eyalet of the Archipelago and Algiers. Hayreddin's successors succeeded to these holdings, but saw their rank drop to two-horsetail vizier for several centuries.

Naval flag of the Kapudan Pasha.

The official residence of the Kapudan Pasha was in the Divankhane in the Imperial Arsenal in the Golden Horn, but the Pasha was often away as governorship of the Eyalet of the Archipelago entailed visiting its various provinces in person every year. The post was one of great power and prestige within the Ottoman hierarchy: Evliya Çelebi reported in the 17th century that it had an annual income of 885,000 silver akçe. Additional income, to the amount of 300,000 kuruş in the 18th/19th centuries, came from leasing a number of Aegean islands to tax farmers (iltizam).

The heyday of the post of Kapudan Pasha came in the 16th century, when a succession of capable holders brought Ottoman naval power to its height, and for a time ensured Ottoman supremacy in the Mediterranean Sea. Although in theory the post could only be filled by a serving admiral (Kapudan-i Hümayun), a chief of the Imperial Arsenal (Tersane Kethüdasi) or, at the very least, by the sanjak-bey of Rhodes, from the turn of the 17th century the appointment of court favourites and/or persons lacking in military or naval experience marked the beginning of Ottoman naval decline.

Beyond naval command, the Kapudan Pasha held direct gubernatorial authority (as Beylerbey) over most of the Aegean islands (the Cezayir-i Bahr-i Sefid Eyalet), making him responsible for their administration, tax-collection, and shipbuilding resources, effectively merging high naval command with significant provincial governance.

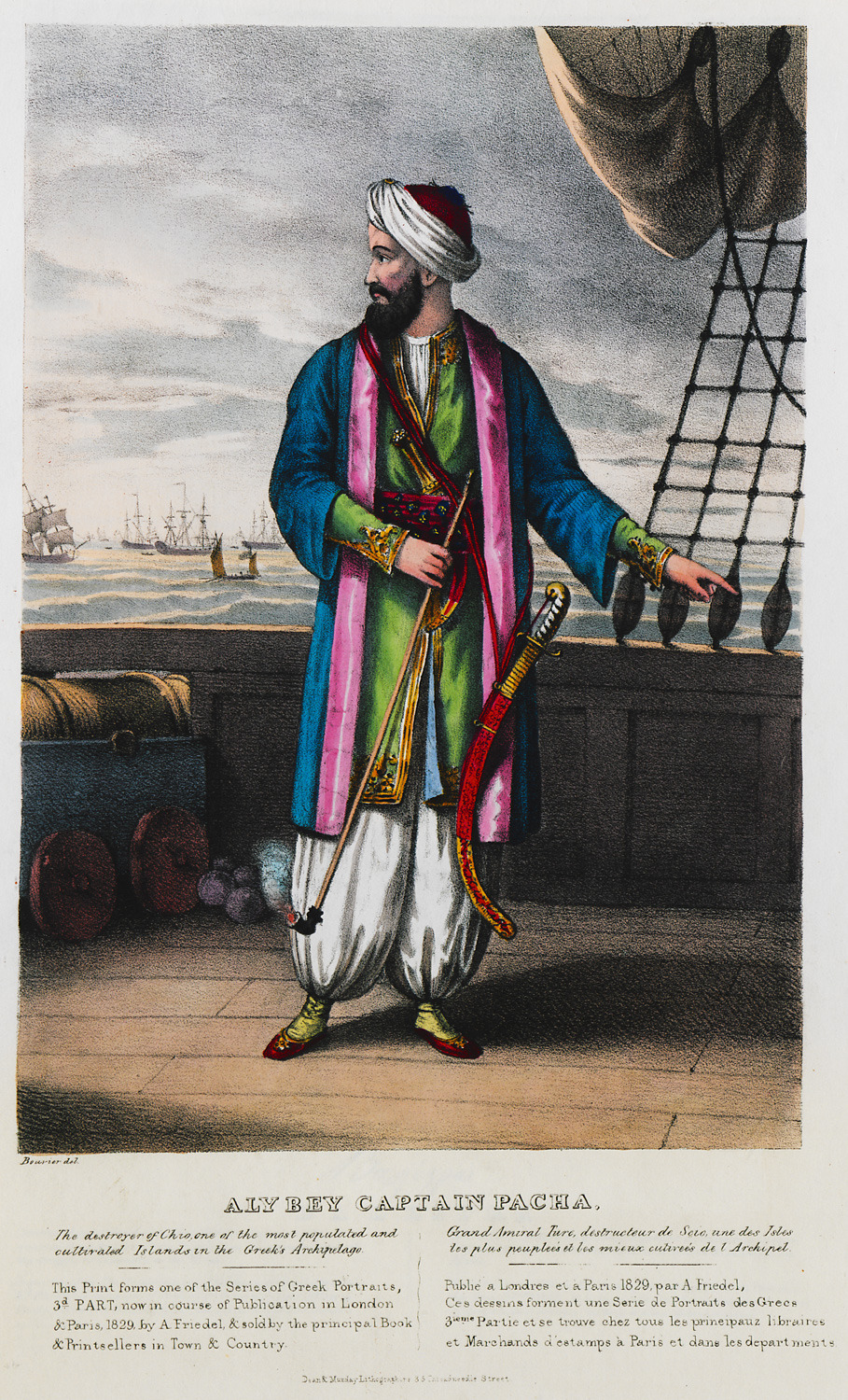
Nasuhzade Ali Pasha, Kapudan Pasha during the early stages of the Greek War of Independence in the 1820s

The Tanzimat reforms of 1839-1876 reduced the Eyalet of the Archipelago in rank and granted its governance to the wāli of Rhodes in 1848. The Kapudan Pashas retained their rank, but were thereafter solely military servicemen.

A total of 161 captains served until 13 March 1867 when the post of Derya Kaptan was abolished and replaced by ministers (Bahriye Nazırı) of the Ottoman Naval Ministry. After 1877, these were replaced by the Fleet Commanders.

== See also ==
- List of Kapudan Pashas
- List of fleet commanders of the Ottoman Navy (which replaced this office)
- List of Ottoman admirals
