= Liwa (Arabic) =

Meaning district, banner, or a military rank

Liwa (Arabic: لواء, liwā’, "ensign" or "banner") has various meanings in Arabic:

- a banner, in all senses (flag, advertising banner, election publicity banner, etc.)
- a district; see also: banner (administrative division)
- a level of military unit with its own ensign, now used as the equivalent to brigade
- an officer commanding a number of liwa units, now equivalent to a major general

In Turkish, liva (لواء, livâ) was used interchangeably with sanjak to describe the secondary administrative divisions into which the provinces of the Ottoman Empire were divided. After the fall of the empire, the term was used in the Arab countries formerly under Ottoman rule. It was gradually replaced by other terms like qadaa and mintaqa and is now defunct. It is only used occasionally in Syria to refer to the Hatay Province, ceded by the French mandate of Syria to Turkey in 1939, when it was Liwa’ Iskenderun.
