= Ibrahimpur =

Ibrahimpur may refer to several places in India:

- Ibrahimpur, Ranga Reddy district, Andhra Pradesh
- Ibrahimpur, Aurangabad, a List of villages in Aurangabad district, Bihar
- Ibrahim Pur, Delhi
- Ibrahimpur, Dharwad, Karnataka
- Ibrahimpur, SBS Nagar, Punjab
- Ibrahimpur, Azamgarh, Uttar Pradesh
