= Heinrich von Poser =

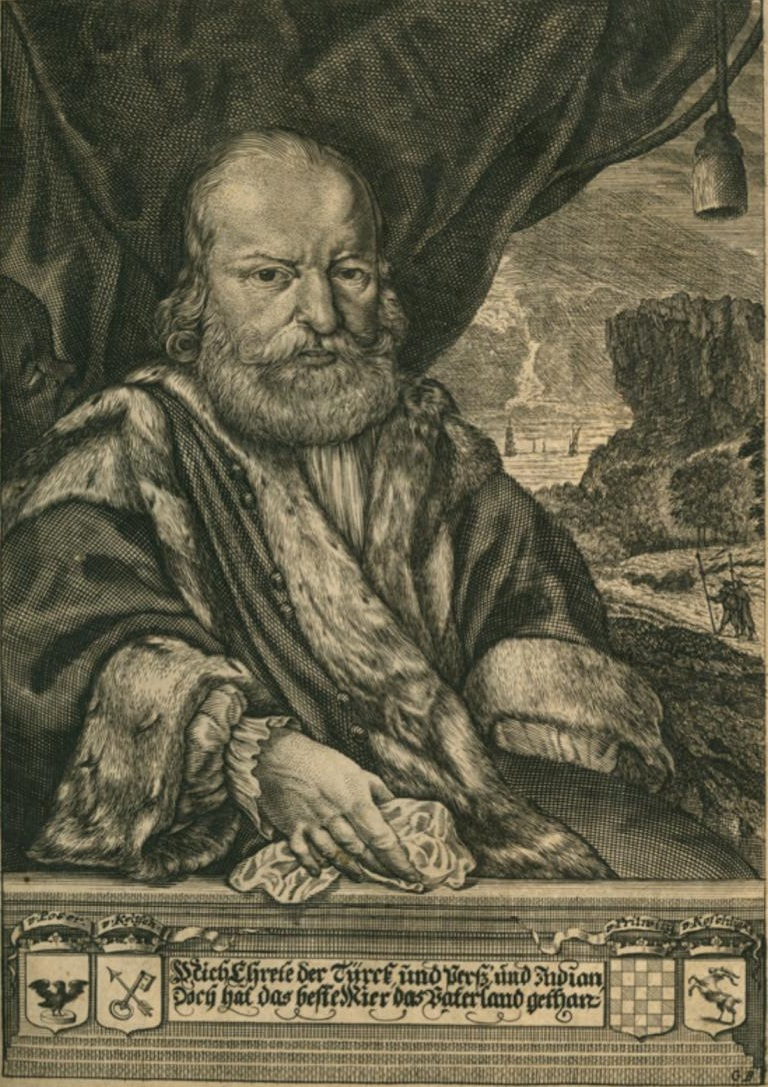
- Born: 23 September 1599; Eisdorf, Duchy of Jawor, Bohemian Crown
- Died: 13 August 1661 (aged 61); Wrocław, Duchy of Wrocław, Bohemian Crown
- Burial place: St. Elizabeth's Church, Wrocław

Heinrich von Poser (23 August 1599 – 13 September 1661) was a German traveler, who wrote a detailed travelogue of his travel to India through Iran.

== Life ==
He was born in Eisdorf on 23 August 1599 to Ernst Georg von Poser and Margaretha von Keltsch. Ancestrally from Nadolice Wielkie, his father owned the estates of Eisdorf and Falkenberg. His father died when he was six years old. He attended school in Świdnica and Wrocław, later becoming a student at the Maria Magdalena Gymnasium in Wrocław. He then went on to study at the University of Marburg. However, after the outbreak of the Thirty Years' War, left the university and returned to his family’s estate without graduating. Despite his mother's wishes, he went on a journey to East on 20 August 1620 via Venice.

=== Travels ===
He arrived in Constantinople on 14 November 1620, where he met the British envoy John Eyre. Despite warnings from Eyre and other European residents of Constantinople, he began the second leg of his journey on 21 January 1621, this time accompanied by a Persian envoy who had been left behind.

He crossed the Ottoman border on 23 March 1621. His journey took him over foothills of Mount Olympus to Amasya and Erzurum, where he began learning Armenian. During his travels, he visited the remnants of Christian churches near Ani. Hosted there by local governor (Amir-Guna khan Qajar), he left for Tabriz. On 14 June 1621, he arrived in Isfahan. A friend of Heinrich, Albrecht von Schilling, had already been at the Persian court for some time, which may have been one of the reasons for Heinrich’s journey. There, he met Abbas the Great and began learning Persian and continued his travels to India on 18 July 1621 together with Claudio Bourne. He reached Kandahar on 27 September. During his further travels, Heinrich suffered from severe recurring fever. At the end of January, he returned via Agra to Lahore, where Europeans and Armenians in the service of the Mughal emperor—particularly the Dutch resident W. Houten—offered him financial assistance, as his funds were nearly exhausted. Alongside Augustin Hiriart of Bordeaux, a Mughal engineer, he visited the emperor’s military camp and gained access to the ruler, offering a brief yet engaging account of his lifestyle. He remained until 28 May, before returning to Agra via Delhi on 17 June.

On 2 July, he left the city, travelling through Malwa via Mandu—where he reflected on the contemporary history of Indian rulers—Sungir, Perambur, and the European trade hubs before reaching Dopalpur, where illness forced him to rest. He then moved on to Fisiapur, staying for over a month as a guest of the soldier Georg Krieger from Dresden. He continued via Ibrahimpur into the Carnatic region, passing through Hyderabad and spending Christmas at the home of the Dutch resident van Offel in Machilipatnam.

On 9 January 1623, he set sail on a Dutch ship, travelling along the Malabar coast, disembarking at Tegenapattam, and traversing the Carnatic via Daraseripeta, Danger, and Nagapattinam before arriving back in Machilipatnam on 17 March. There, he prepared for his return journey, passing through Golconda and Surat, making a side trip to Cambay. On 12 November, he reunited in Surat with his friend Albrecht von Schilling, who was returning from Arabia. They boarded a Dutch ship to Ormus on 15 November, arriving there on 18 December. En route to Isfahan, they were accused in Lar of smuggling gemstones without paying duties or obtaining permission. Poser was escorted back to the port of Cambron but was eventually allowed to continue his journey, reaching Isfahan via Shiraz and Persepolis on 4 June 1624. With financial assistance from Dutch merchants in Isfahan and Aleppo, he was able to travel through Baghdad, via Aleppo to Venice, and finally back home, which he likely reached by the end of 1625.

=== Later life ===
Three years later, he married a widower on 26 June 1629 - Katharina von Schnorbein und Weicherau (née von Bock) of Obereck and marked the occasion with the baptism of a young Indian boy he had brought back from the Carnatic. He had a son with Katharina named Heinrich (who later published his diary). After her death on 30 June 1632, he married another woman named Elisabeth von Lest from the Welkersdorf-Hohlstein family with whom he had five daughters and three sons.

Later he was appointed by Duchy of Jawor as state administrator, a role in which he served with distinction during the turbulent years of the Thirty Years' War. He was buried in St. Elisabeth’s Church in Wrocław on 13 August 1661.

== Legacy ==
According to Friedrich Ratzel, Poser appears to have undertaken his journey purely out of a desire for knowledge. Ratzel argues that his education was at times insufficient to allow him to fully grasp or accurately document the many new things he encountered. His vivid impressions, evident in his writing style, his religious devotion, and his frequent expressions of appreciation for nature—more common than usual for his time—were not enough to make his often monotonous diary entries more engaging or informative. Even his more detailed descriptions, such as those of Ormus and Persepolis, remain somewhat superficial. It is evident that his travel journal was not originally intended for publication. It was eventually translated from Latin into German and published in Jena in 1675. The translator and editor was a learned servant of the von Poser house, who signed as B. G. in Świdnica on 10 April 1675. He largely adhered to the Latin text and added nine pages of useful annotations but also introduced some errors and unnecessary omissions in his translation.

=== Works ===
- "The Life and Death of the Most Noble Lord Heinrich von Poser and Nadolice Wielkie, Royal Appointee of the Principalities of Świdnica and Jawor in Silesia, in which his Travel Diary from Constantinople through Bulgaria, Armenia, Persia, and India is revealed, presented by his grateful son Heinrich von P. and Nadolice Wielkie of Tschechen, Nieder Körnitz, Obereck, Royal Appointee and Chief Tax Collector of the aforementioned Principalities, otherwise known as 'The Examined' (Der beeden Königl. Erb-Fürstenthümer Schweidnitz und Jauer in Schlesien hochverordneten Landes Bestelltens des Hoch Edelgebohrnen Herren Heinrich von Poser und Groß-Nedlitz Lebens- und Todes Geschichte, Worinnen das Tagebuch seiner Reise von Constantinopel aus durch die Bulgarey, Armenien, Persien und Indien aus Licht gestellet von dessen dankbahren Sohne Heinrich von P. und Groß Nedlitz auf Tschechen, Nieder Körnitz, Obereck, gedachter Fürstenthümer Königlichem Manne und Ober-Steuer-Einnehmer, sonst dem Geprüften)
