= Alpan Beg =

Safavid courtier (died 1608 or 1609)

- Alpan Beg with Qarachaqay Khan (in red)

Yasavul-i suhbat (Aide-de-camp)
- In office 1604–1605
- Monarch: Abbas the Great

Personal details
- Died: 1608 or 1609
- Cause of death: Execution
- Relations: Gulabi Beg (father); Amir Guna Khan (brother); Husain Quli Beg (brother)

Alpan Beg (Persian: آلپان بیگ; d. 1608 or 1609) was the Safavid courtier and military personnel under Abbas the Great. He was a member of Qajar tribe and brother of Safavid military commander Amir-Guna Khan Qajar.

== Career ==
=== Service at court ===
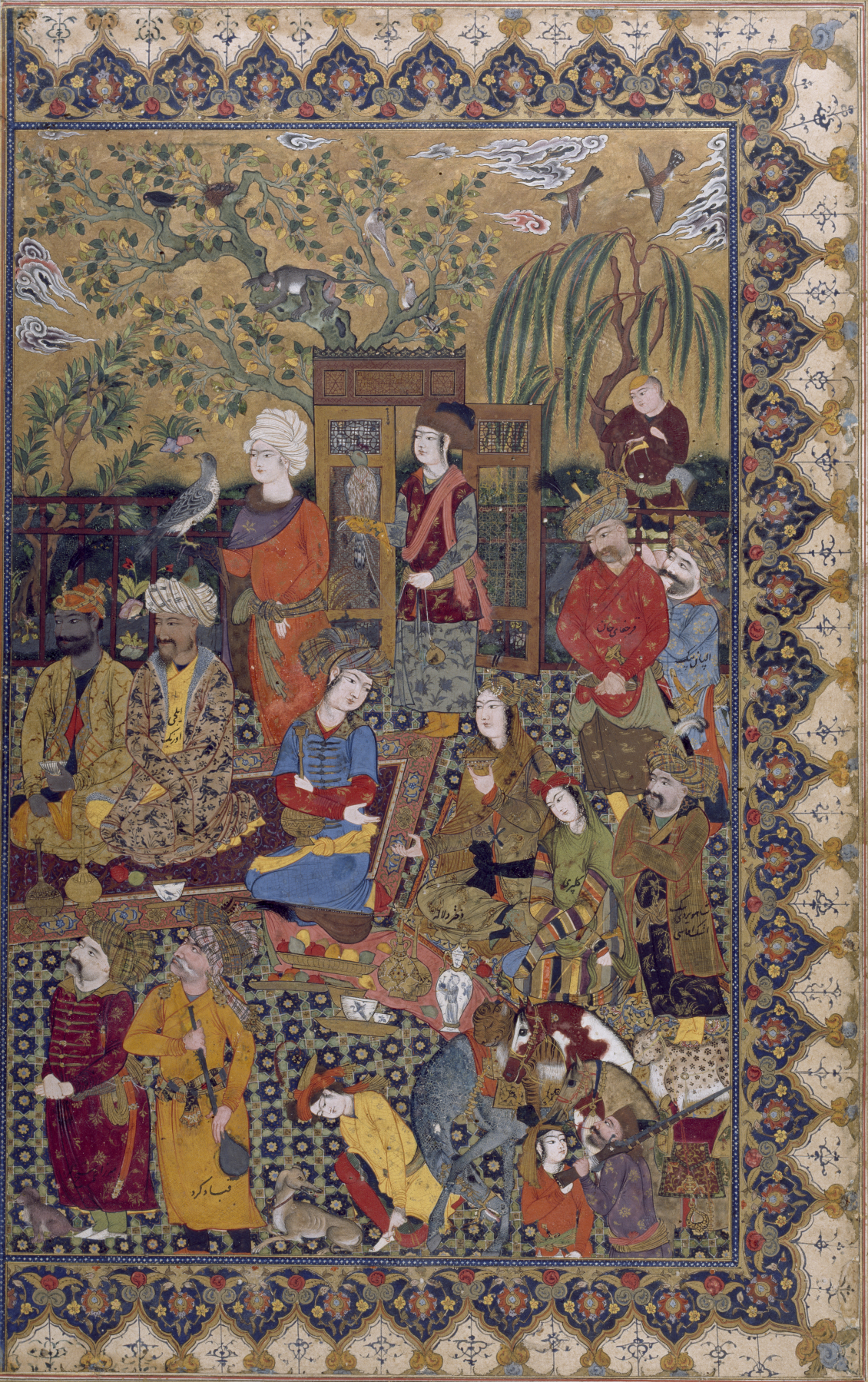
Alpān Beg (upper right, in blue) in the Walters miniature

Alpan Beg was a ranking official at Safavid court in Qazvin, which remained the official capital of Safavid Iran until 1598. In 1593, Shah Abbas ordered him to travel to Isfahan and construct a residence next to the Naqsh-e Jahan Square for Hajim Khan, the exiled ruler of Khwarazm, whom shah intended to receive in Isfahan. Alpan Beg was dispatched to Isfahan in October 1593 and completed a "lofty" building in approximately twenty days. Alpan Beg occupied a position of considerable importance at court by early 1590s. Babaie describes him as a ranking official at Qazvin and connects his construction project with the early development of Shah Abbas's royal precinct in Isfahan. In same year, Alpan Beg is described as a Great Amir. When Shah Abbas entered Isfahan in 1593, he ordered Alpan Beg to assemble approximately 15,000 infantrymen from surrounding villages and arrange them along the route of shah's ceremonial entry into city. Ceremony was disrupted by heavy rain and was subsequently restaged in the Maydan-i Harun Vilayat.

=== Military service ===
Alpan Beg subsequently served in Shah Abbas's military entourage. Babaie identifies him as shah's Aide-de-camp (Yasavul Subhat) in 1604-1605. Reid, identifies an Alpan Beg among the Qajar military elite as a brother of Amir Guna Khan and Husain Quli Beg. Reid's discussion of Qajar uymāq, drawing on Safavid sources, associates Alpan Beg with Qajar military establishment and describes him as leading a group of musketeers (Tofangchis).

=== Return to court service ===
By final years of his career, Alpan Beg held office of Yasavul-bashi. The Yasavul belonged to shah's household and ceremonial establishment, while the Yasavul-bashi was their chief. In a study of a Safavid court painting, the office is described as that of the steward of the shah's private royal ceremonies.

== Death ==
Alpan Beg was executed in 1608 or 1609. According to Fazli Isfahani Khuzani, author of Afzal al-Tavarikh, his downfall was connected with his display of affection toward an Arab courtesan who was present at an assembly of Shah Abbas.

== Family ==
Alpan Beg was from Aqcha Qoyunlu clan of Qajar tribe. His father was Gulabi beg Aqcha Qoyunlu who was a qurchi. He had several brothers - Husain Quli beg (head of Safavid cannon corps, d. 1609/1610) and Amir-Guna Khan Qajar, the governor of Chokhur-e Sa'd region.

== Sources ==
- Babaie, Sussan (2004). Slaves of the Shah: New Elites of Safavid Iran. London: I.B. Tauris.
- Babaie, Sussan (2008). Isfahan and Its Palaces: Statecraft, Shi'ism and the Architecture of Conviviality in Early Modern Iran. Edinburgh: Edinburgh University Press. ISBN 9780748633753.
- Floor, Willem (2019). "A Now-Lost Safavid Pavilion and Its Figural Tile Panels". Metropolitan Museum Journal. 54: 76–91.
- McChesney, R. D. (1988). "Four Sources on Shah Abbas's Building of Isfahan". Muqarnas. 5: 103–134.
- Reid, James J. (1978). "The Qajar Uymaq in the Safavid Period, 1500–1722". Iranian Studies. 11 (1–4): 117–143. doi:10.1080/00210867808701542.
