= Damat Murtaza Pasha =

Ottoman governor of Budin, Silistra and Erivan in 17th century

- داماد مرتضى پاشا

Beylerbey of Budin
- In office 29 August 1626 – February 1630
- Appointed by: Murad IV
- Preceded by: Sofu Mehmed Pasha
- Succeeded by: Acem Hasan Pasha

Beylerbey of Silistra
- In office February 1630 – 1632
- Appointed by: Murad IV
- Preceded by: Hüseyin Pasha
- Succeeded by: Abaza Mehmed Pasha

Governor of Erivan
- In office 7 August 1635 – 1 April 1636
- Appointed by: Murad IV
- Preceded by: Tahmaspqoli Khan Qajar
- Succeeded by: Abbasqoli Khan Qajar

Personal details
- Died: April 1, 1636 Erivan, Chokhur-e Sa'd, Safavid Empire
- Spouse: Ayşe Sultan (m. 1633)

Military service
- Battles/wars: Tatar raids on the Commonwealth; Polish–Ottoman War (1633–1634); Ottoman–Safavid War (1623–1639)

Damat Murtaza Pasha or Naima Murtaza Pasha (Ottoman Turkish: داماد مرتضى پاشا; d. 1636) was an Ottoman statesman who held the positions of beylerbey and vizier.

== Life ==
There is no available information about the early years of his life. He was educated in the Enderun.

While serving as beylerbey of Bosnia, he was appointed vizier and then beylerbey of Budin on 29/30 August 1626. At the beginning of February 1630, Murtaza Pasha left his post as beylerbey of Budin to become the commander in charge of the defence of Özi Fortress. He was to be aided by Canibek Giray, Khan of Crimea. While en route, the pasha was met in Izmail in mid-July by the royal envoy Aleksander Piaseczyński, who was travelling to Constantinople. While Piaseczyński was still in the capital, Murtaza Pasha and Stanisław Koniecpolski maintained cross-border negotiations through messengers. A seven-clause draft dated 9 September 1630 included a clause requiring Khan Temir to stop their raid of the Polish–Lithuanian Commonwealth. Murtaza Pasha remained beylerbey of Özi until 1632. He was replaced by Abaza Mehmed Pasha, who for some time had attempted to continue the policies of his predecessor.

On 6 January 1632, he is recorded as the beylerbey of Diyarbakır. After taking this post, he had the former grand vizier Hüsrev Pasha executed in Tokat on the sultan’s orders. While serving as beylerbey of Diyarbakır, he was summoned to Istanbul in early 1634 for preparations of a campaign against Poland, due to his previous experience in Özi. In early April, Murtaza Pasha departed on the campaign with Sultan Murad IV’s army. Although the sultan returned to Istanbul after the Polish side requested peace, Murtaza Pasha was appointed commander-in-chief and continued the advance with the army placed under his command for security purposes. He played an active role in the peace negotiations and, on 27 July 1634, a peace was concluded with the Poles.

In spring 1635, during the Ottoman–Safavid War of 1623–1639 he followed Sultan Murad IV against the Safavids, then serving as beylerbey of Diyarbakır. Murad launched a counter-operation after hearing of a Safavid movement led by Amir-Guna Khan towards Van and succeeded in preventing an attack. Upon the capture of Erivan on 8 August 1635, Murtaza Pasha was given 12,000 soldiers and tasked with the governorship and defence of the region along with the post of beylerbey of Erzurum. Following Murad IV’s return to Istanbul, the Safavids resumed their offensive. After a three-month siege, Erivan Fortress fell on 1 April 1636, and Murtaza Pasha was killed during the siege.

== Family ==
In February 1633, he married Ayşe Sultan, sister of Murad IV and widow of the former grand vizier Hafız Ahmed Pasha who had been killed by rebellious soldiers, thus becoming a groom (Turkish: Damat) to the imperial family, from which he took the epithet “Damat”; the nuptials though not being held until his arrival at the imperial capitol of Constantinople in 1635. Murtaza Pasha was an old and ailing husband at this point, whom she strongly disliked, according to Venetian reports.

== Sources ==
- Uluçay, Mustafa Çağatay (1985). Padışahların kadınları ve kızları (in Turkish). Türk Tarihi Kurumu Yayınları.
- Sakaoğlu, Necdet (2008). Bu mülkün kadın sultanları: Vâlide sultanlar, hâtunlar, hasekiler, kadınefendiler, sultanefendiler (in Turkish). Oğlak Yayıncılık.
- Blaszczyk, Arkadiusz (2024), "Frühneuzeitliche Dimensionen steppennomadischer Gewalt: Tataren, Mangiten und Nogaier als grenzüberschreitende Gewaltakteure im Krimkhanat und im Osmanischen Reich, 1538-1637", Frühneuzeitliche Dimensionen steppennomadischer Gewalt (in German), De Gruyter, doi:10.1515/9783110749458, ISBN 978-3-11-074945-8
