= Tahmaspqoli Khan Qajar =

Safavid official

- طهماسب قلی خان قاجار

Governor of Chokhur-e Sa'd
- In office 1625 – 7 August 1635
- Appointed by: Abbas the Great
- Preceded by: Amir-Guna Khan Qajar
- Succeeded by: Damat Murtaza Pasha

Beylerbey of Aleppo Eyalet
- In office 16 August 1635 – 6 October 1635
- Appointed by: Murad IV
- Preceded by: Küçük Ahmed Pasha
- Succeeded by: Küçük Ahmed Pasha

Personal details
- Died: July 17, 1641 or September 7, 1641 Constantinople or Izmit, Ottoman Empire
- Parent: Amir-Guna Khan Qajar

Military service
- Battles/wars: Ottoman–Safavid war (1603–1612); Ottoman–Safavid War (1623–1639)

Tahmaspqoli Khan Qajar (Persian: طهماسب قلی خان قاجار, romanized: Tahmāsb Qolī Khān Qājār) and later Emirgûneoğlu Yusuf Paşa was a Safavid official, governor of Chokhur-e Sa'd region (Erivan province) of Safavid Empire from Qajar tribe. He was a son and successor of Amir-Guna Khan Qajar. His tenure saw the fall of the region to Ottoman sultan Murad IV.

== Life ==
He was born to the family of Amir-Guna Khan Qajar, governor of Chokhur-e Sa'd region. His uncle Husain Quli beg (d. 1609/1610) was head of Safavid cannon corps, while his other uncle Alpan Beg was leading a group of musketeers. According to Zakaria of Kanaker, he had "a handsome appearance, large eyes, thin eyebrows, a broad forehead, broad shoulders, a small mouth and small teeth, was pleasant in conversation and sweet-tongued, fair and just, truth-loving and impartial."

=== Under Safavid Empire ===
According to Arakel of Tabriz, he was tasked by Shah Abbas to transfer Etchmiadzin Cathedral to Isfahan's New Julfa in 1615. Apparently he became a keeper of seal of Abbas but was returned to Erivan as acting beylerbey following the mortal injury of his father in 1625 during Battle of Marabda. Meanwhile, using the opportunity, Kurdish chiefs in Ottoman territory raided the Sharur valley. Reportedly incapable Amir-Guna recalled his son to defend territories, who managed to repel the attack. At the same time, he managed to repel an Ottoman attack near Karbi. This story is also corroborated by Isgandar beg Munshi. Zakaria later retells a rumor about Tahmasp killing his father: "Some say he strangled him with a rope, others claim he pressed a pillow to his face and sat on him until he suffocated. Yet others argue that Amir-Guna Khan died of his wounds, as doctors failed to heal him—despite applying numerous remedies, his wound worsened until he died in agony." However, he accepts that patricide story is doubtful. According to Arakel however, Tahmasp was still at Shah's court at the time of his death.

According to Zakaria, when Murad IV decided to march on Erivan, new Safavid shah Safi I ordered Rustam Khan Saakadze to counter the attack with capture of Van. He summoned Tahmaspqoli to join him but the khan refused, arguing that leaving his post would make the border vulnerable. Unable to take Van, Rostam complained about Tahmaspqoli to Safi, who ignored the complaint. However, according to Turkish sources, he launched an attack against the Kurdish Mahmudi tribe with an army of 10,000 men. Then, after capturing a lot of booty and prisoners towards Adilcevaz, he arrived around Khoy.

Jean-Baptiste Tavernier, who traveled to Safavid Iran alongside Johann Rudolf Stadler, recounted that Tahmaspqoli Khan received them with great enthusiasm. The Khan remarked that Stadler was the first watchmaker to ever set foot in the Safavid realm. Eager to test his skills, the Khan asked Stadler to repair a watch he had acquired from a merchant. However, Stadler never had the opportunity to complete the task, as the Khan constantly invited them to lavish banquets, leaving little time for work.

=== Ottoman invasion ===
Zakaria reported Tahmaspqoli was sent against Teimuraz I sometime later, which must have happened in 1633 when Rustam Khan Saakadze was campaigning to appoint Rostom of Kartli as new vassal. Using the opportunity, Ottoman army invaded Shirak and Nig regions, entering Kotayk and besieging Yeghvard. However Ottomans retreated to Kars as soon as Tahmaspqoli returned. Tahmaspqoli ordered Armenian recruits to ambush the Ottoman soldiers near the banks of the Arpa River. Kurdish emirs Bahaeddin and Muhammed Bey Mahmudi were wounded in this battle. Zakaria claims that reason for Murad IV's march on Erivan was that Tahmaspqoli's Armenian spy was compromised by a khan's steward Murad Agha who was loyal to Ottomans. Zakaria claims that Murad Agha secretly wrote a letter on Tahmaspqoli's name, declaring his allegiance to the Sultan, as well as inviting him to invade.

Murad IV's army left Constantinople on 16 March 1635 and reached outskirts of Erivan on 26 July 1635. Meanwhile Erivan was reinforced by 12,000 Mazanderani musketeers led by Sadiq b. Mir-Fattah. Tahmaspqoli's soldiers almost killed Murad IV's with a cannon attack on the first day. Castle came under heavy cannon fire commanded by Canpolatoğlu Mustafa Pasha (governor of Rumeli and a nephew of Ali Janbulad), Gazi Hüseyin Pasha and Küçük Ahmed Pasha (governor of Aleppo) on 29 July. After a long siege, Tahmaspqoli sent his subordinate Khizir beg on 5 August to ask for 6 day ceasefire to surrender - an offer Murad refused. Sultan counter offered only one day and asked for Tahmaspqoli to personally surrender. Tahmaspqoli sent Murad Agha to negotiate the next day, himself meeting the sultan on 7 August and personally surrendering. According to official chronology of the Sultan written by an anonymous author, he was accompanied by Nowruz Sultan, Murad Agha, Muhammad Emin, Khizir Beg and Bozjalu Sultan, a fact that was corroborated by Zakaria.

=== Under Ottoman Empire ===
According to anonymous Ottoman chronicler, Tahmaspqoli met Murad IV for the second time on 9 August for two hours and was awarded 5,000 gold. A week later, on 16 August, Murad IV appointed Tahmaspqoli as governor of Aleppo Eyalet and his steward Murad Agha to Tripoli Eyalet. The castle was entrusted to Murat IV's brother-in-law Damat Murtaza Pasha on 18 August. The chronicler mentions Tahmaspqoli again on next day by his new name Yusuf Pasha. Tahmaspqoli and Murad's families were sent to Constantinople. However, just after few months, Murtaza Pasha reported to the Sultan that Murad Agha was murdered by Tahmaspqoli. Zakaria of Kanaker confirms this information, however he claims the incident took place en route to Constantinople. According to Zakaria, Tahmaspqoli accused Murad of causing the fall of Erivan and killed him while they were resting in Alacahan Kervanserai (located in modern Alacahan, Kürelik). According to Naima, however, the incident took place in a kervansaray named Keşişhanı. Although Zakaria claims that Murad IV approved of this murder, anonymous Ottoman chronicler and Naima both wrote that Murad reinstated Küçük Ahmed Pasha as governor of Aleppo and decreed Yusuf Pasha to be investigated as he was "known for his evil character and treacherous ways" on 6 October 1635.

Ahmed Pasha was tasked by Sultan to take Tahmaspqoli to Izmit and wait his final verdict. Tahmaspqoli sent letters to Murad IV when he arrived Geyve on 20 December 1635. Sultan subsequently forgave him when they met again personally two days later followed by Iranian style music and celebrations. Moreover, Tahmaspqoli was bestowed a farm in Kağıthane, a palace in Ahırkapı, and an estate, which grew into a neighborhood later called Emirgan. He followed the Sultan to Constantinople and led imperial hunting troops in triumphal entrance.

According to Ottoman sources although he became a part of Imperial Council, Tahmaspqoli spent the remainder of his years not involving in politics or military campaigns. He was not allowed to join against Murad's campaign against Baghdad. Alvise Contarini, the Venetian bailo speculated that it was because either Sultan didn't trust him, or it was due to his own request. Reportedly Murad IV, often visited his mansion and spent some nights there during his illness. Evliya Çelebi met both the sultan and him on 6 March 1636 and thought of him as a drunkard. Contarini reported on 1 February 1640 that they drank so much that had to be carried away.

After his death on 8 February 1640, Tahmaspqoli's position came under question. Zakaria of Kanaker claimed that Tahmaspqoli wished to return to Iran and even penned a request to the Shah. According to his narrative, Rustam Khan Saakadze seeing him as a rival, requested Kemankeş Kara Mustafa Pasha to murder him. According to Turkish sources, a Safavid envoy named Ibrahim Khan of Mughan arrived in Constantinople on 14 July 1641 and asked for extradition of Tahmaspqoli. Reportedly, Sultan Ibrahim was enraged and declared that if "a man who does not appreciate the generosity of our empire has no reason to live!"

Tahmaspqoli was reportedly executed and buried in Izmit on July 17 according to Mustafa Naima, but a Ragusan doctor named Francesco Crasso reported his death date as 7 September 1641:

On Saturday the 7th of this month, in the morning, when His Excellency the Pasha returned from the Divan, he had Emir Ghiondi summoned hastily. The Emir, responding quickly, arrived while the Pasha was giving the audience in the great hall. He was then led into the small chamber where the Pasha usually resided during the winter.

The unfortunate man, suspecting nothing, sat down and, while having his sweaty head rubbed by the pages of the Vizier, as well as by his treasurer, he waited for the arrival of the Vizier. At that moment, our khwaja appeared, accompanied by the public executioner and two other ministers.

The khawaja had barely uttered the words Emri Padişahım (that is, the Royal Mandate) when the executioner struck him fiercely with his knee to the back, knocking him to the ground.

At the same instant, one of the ministers threw a noose around his neck, tightening it so well that within a moment he was dead, without uttering a single word or making the slightest movement.

The Pasha and a few others came to view the body, after which it was immediately covered with a cloth and, by vespers, was miserably buried behind the arsenal—without any ceremony or the customary funeral rites given to the faithful of their religion.

He was considered a heretic, even a relapsed one, and under this pretext, the brutality was concealed.

Rumours abound, and everyone speaks in their own way. Many believe that his death was orchestrated at the request of the Safavid ambassador, or even of that prince. Others say it was because he was about to return to Persia. Some claim that it was simply his fate, like that of many who fell into Ottoman hands. Just as it happened in the time of Your Excellency, when Şahin Giray, King of the Tatars, was killed, and not long before him, another was executed here, and another in Rhodes.

Man Oğlı, also known as the Emir of Saida, Canta Emir, Khalaf Khan, Bektaş Han, Mir Fattah, and his son—the Ottomans do not fear the dead but rather the living.

Yet, this wretched man, even in life, should have been counted among the dead, as he was always buried in wine and debauchery. He left behind a wife and a single daughter, who is nearing the age of marriage. His splendid garden has been gifted by the Sultan to the Vizier, who is quickly furnishing it and preparing it for a banquet to host the Sultan on Monday.

— Rota, Giorgio (2008). "The Death of Tahmaspqoli Xan Qajar According to a Contemporary Ragusan Source". In Ritter, Markus; Kauz, Ralph; Hoffmann, Birgitt (eds.). Iran und iranisch geprägte Kulturen: Studien zum 65. Geburtstag von Bert G. Fragner. Beiträge zur Iranistik. Wiesbaden: Reichert. pp. 54–64. ISBN 978-3-89500-607-4. OCLC 233544665.

== In popular culture ==
In the Turkish TV series Magnificent Century Kösem, Emir Güne is portrayed by actor Eser Karabil.

== Sources ==
- Bournoutian, George A. (2004). The chronicle of deacon Zakʻaria of Kʻanakʻer. Armenian studies series. Costa Mesa, Calif: Mazda Publishers. ISBN 978-1-56859-121-6.
- Bournoutian, George A. (2010). Book of history: Aṛak'el Dawrizhets'i, Girk' patmut'eants'. Armenian studies series. Costa Mesa, Calif: Mazda Publishers. ISBN 978-1-56859-172-8.
- Munshi, Iskandar beg (2010). Tarikh-e Alam-ara-ye Abbasi (in Azerbaijani). Baku: Şərq-Qərb. ISBN 978-9952-34-620-6. OCLC 843766675.
- Naima, Mustafa (1968). Naîmâ târihi (in Turkish). Vol. 3. Z. Danışman Yayınevi.
