= Sanjak of Vize =

Ottoman era province

Sanjak of Vize Ottoman Turkish: Liva-i Vize
- Sanjak of the Ottoman Empire
- ca. 1470–ca. 1920
- Coat of arms
- Capital: Vize (until 1849); Tekfürtaği
- History
  - Ottoman conquest: ca. 1470
  - Disestablished: ca. 1920
- Today part of: Turkey

The Sanjak of Vize (Ottoman Turkish: Sancak-i/Liva-i Vize) was a second-level Ottoman province (sanjak or liva) encompassing the region of Vize in Eastern Thrace. After 1849 its seat was moved to Tekfürtaği, and until its end ca. 1920 the province was known as the Sanjak of Tekfürtaği.

== History ==
The town of Vize (Greek Bizye) was part of the remnants of the Byzantine Empire, which fell with the Ottoman conquest of Constantinople in 1453.

The town became the seat of a sanjak as part of the Rumelia Eyalet in the last third of the 15th century. By the mid-17th century, it had come under the Özü Eyalet, after 1812 to the Silistra Eyalet, and by 1846 to the Edirne Eyalet. It was renamed into Sanjak of Tekfürtaği in 1849, after the new capital, Tekfürtaği (mod. Tekirdağ). Vize itself was detached in 1879 and came under the Sanjak of Kırk Kilise. In 1912, the sanjak of Tekfürtaği encompassed the kazas (districts) of Tekfürtaği proper, Malkara, Çorlu, and Hayrabolu. In 1920, the area, along with the entirety of Eastern Thrace, was occupied by the Greek Army, who held it until they withdrew in October 1922 following the Armistice of Mudanya. After 1923 the town of Tekirdağ became the capital of the Tekirdağ Province in the Republic of Turkey.

== Sources ==
- Birken, Andreas (1976). Die Provinzen des Osmanischen Reiches. Beihefte zum Tübinger Atlas des Vorderen Orients (in German). Vol. 13. Reichert. ISBN 9783920153568.
