= Portrait of Martin Luther (Lucas Cranach the Younger) =

Painting by Lucas Cranach the Younger

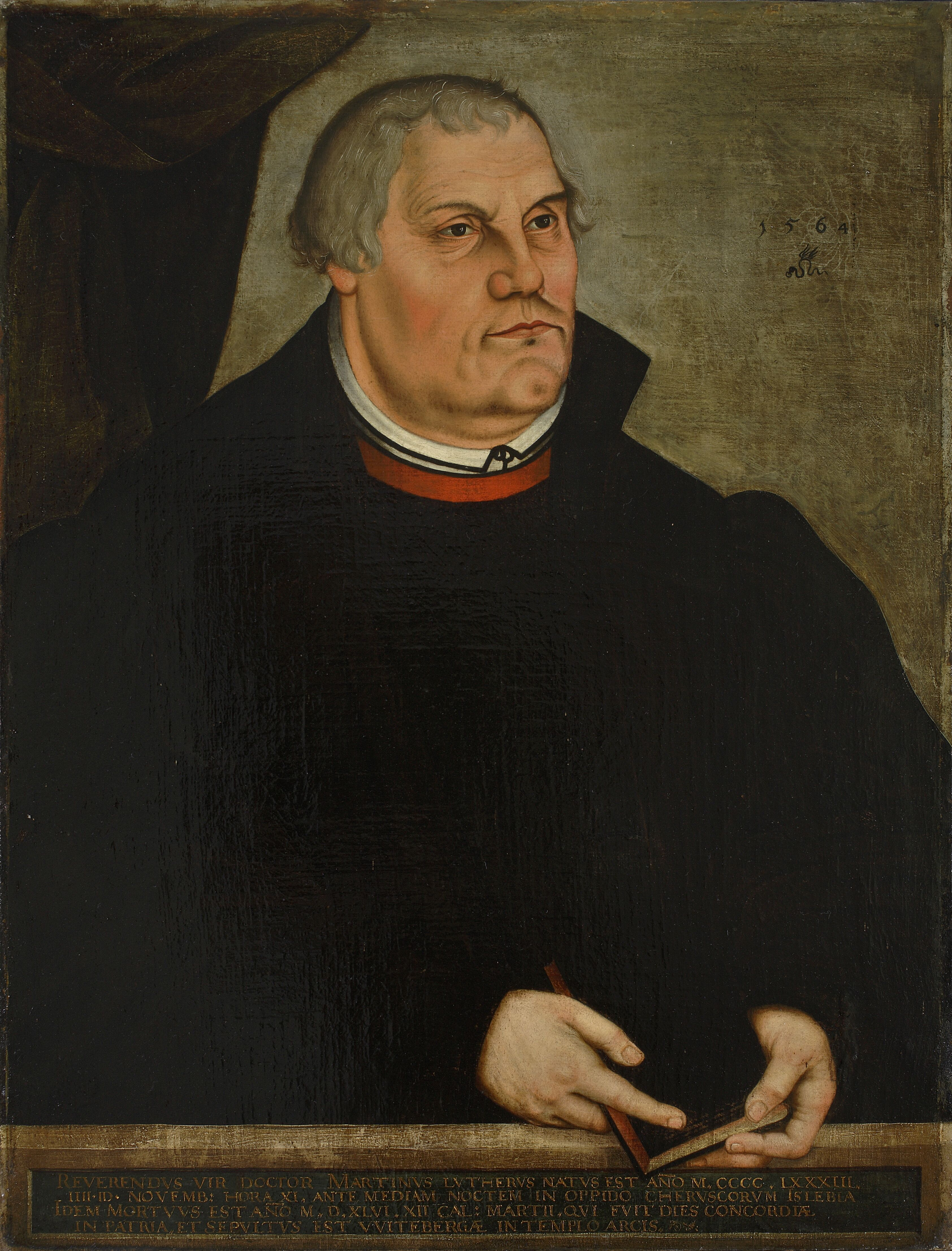
Portrait of Martin Luther (1564) by Lucas Cranach the Younger

Portrait of Martin Luther is an oil on canvas painting by Lucas Cranach the Younger and studio, from 1564. It was located in St. Elizabeth's Church, Wrocław, before World War Two, and now is held in the National Museum, Warsaw. It is based on Lucas Cranach the Elder's three-quarter length 1539 portrait of Martin Luther.

The subject holds a black-bound Bible and is dressed in everyday clothes and without unnecessary decoration, fitting the conventions of bourgeois portraiture of the time. In the top right hand corner is the Cranach coat of arms (a winger snake with a ring in its mouth) and the date 1564. At the bottom is a Latin inscription:

REVERENDVS VIR DOCTOR MARTINVS LVTHERVS NATVS ANO M.CCCC.LXXXIII. IIII.ID. NOVEMB: HORA XI. ANTE MEDIAM NOCTEM IN OPPIDO CHERVSCORVM ISLEBIA IDEM MORTVVS EST ANO M.D.XLVI. XII CAL: MARTII. QVI FVIT DIES CONCORDIAE IN PATRIA. ET SEPVLTVS EST WITEBERGAE IN TEMPLO ARCIS.

== Diptychs ==
The work is a pendant to a portrait of Philip Melanchthon, also now in the National Museum, Warsaw. Such a diptych was a popular product of the Cranach studio, commissioned to decorate private homes or churches.

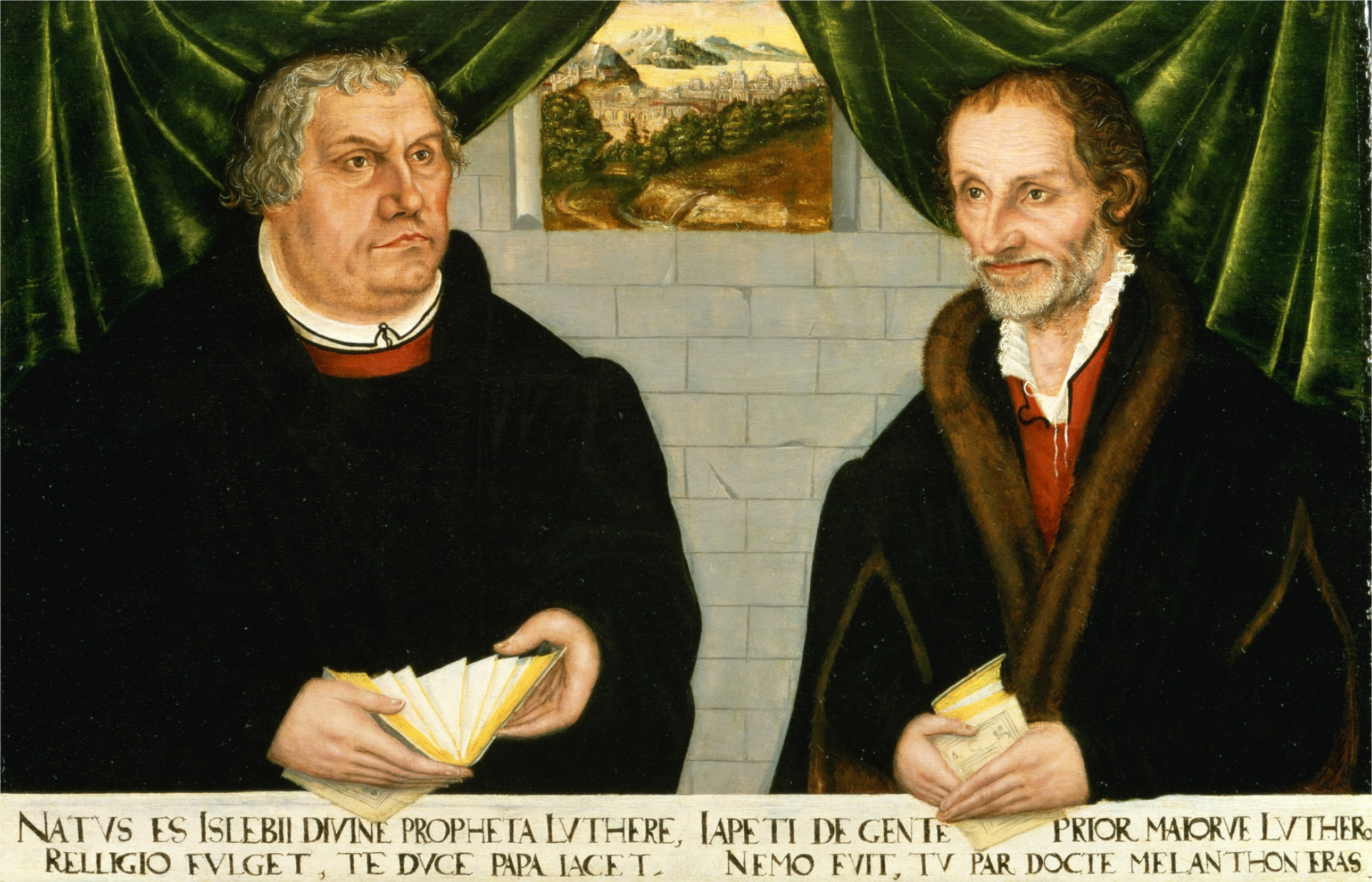

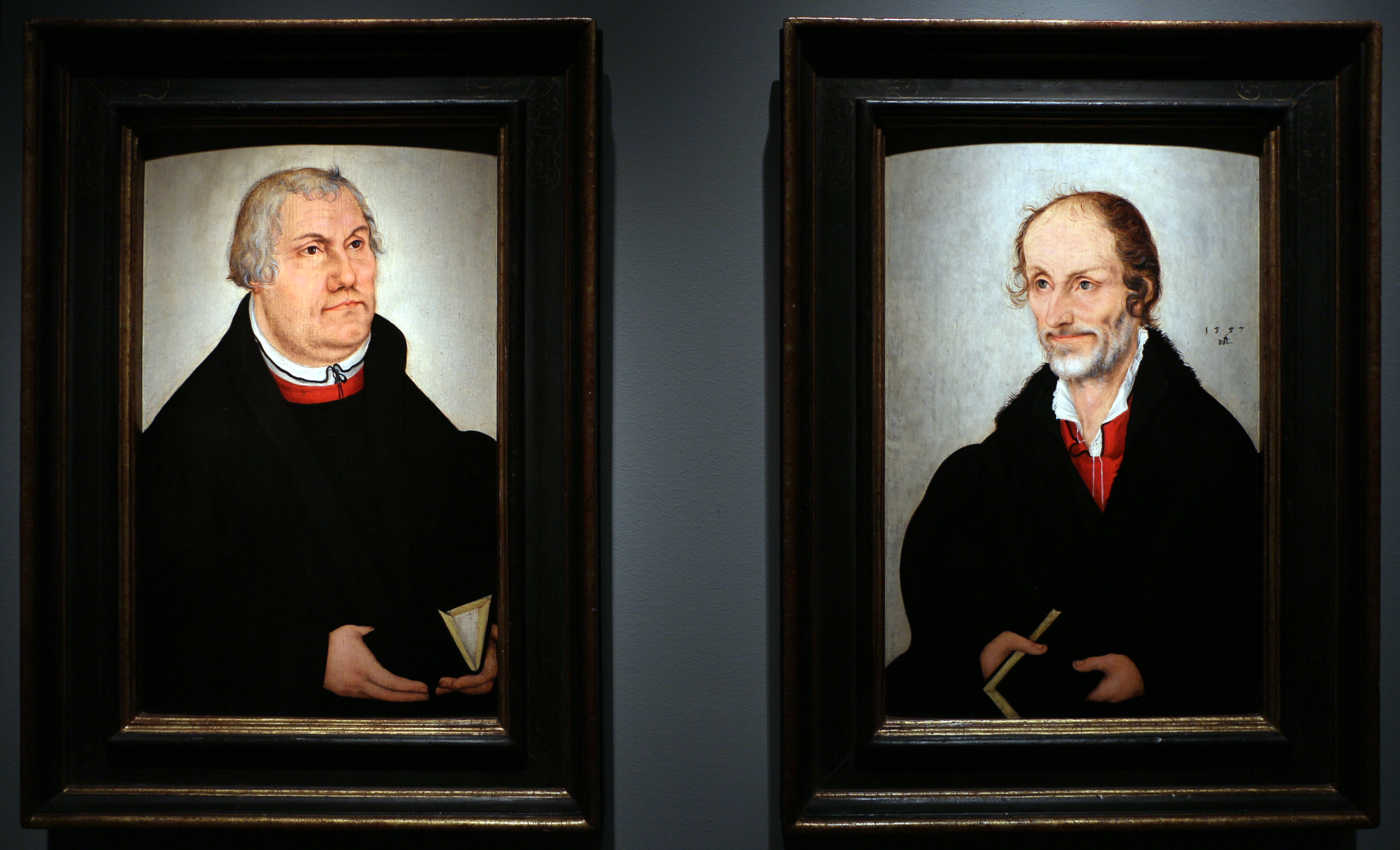

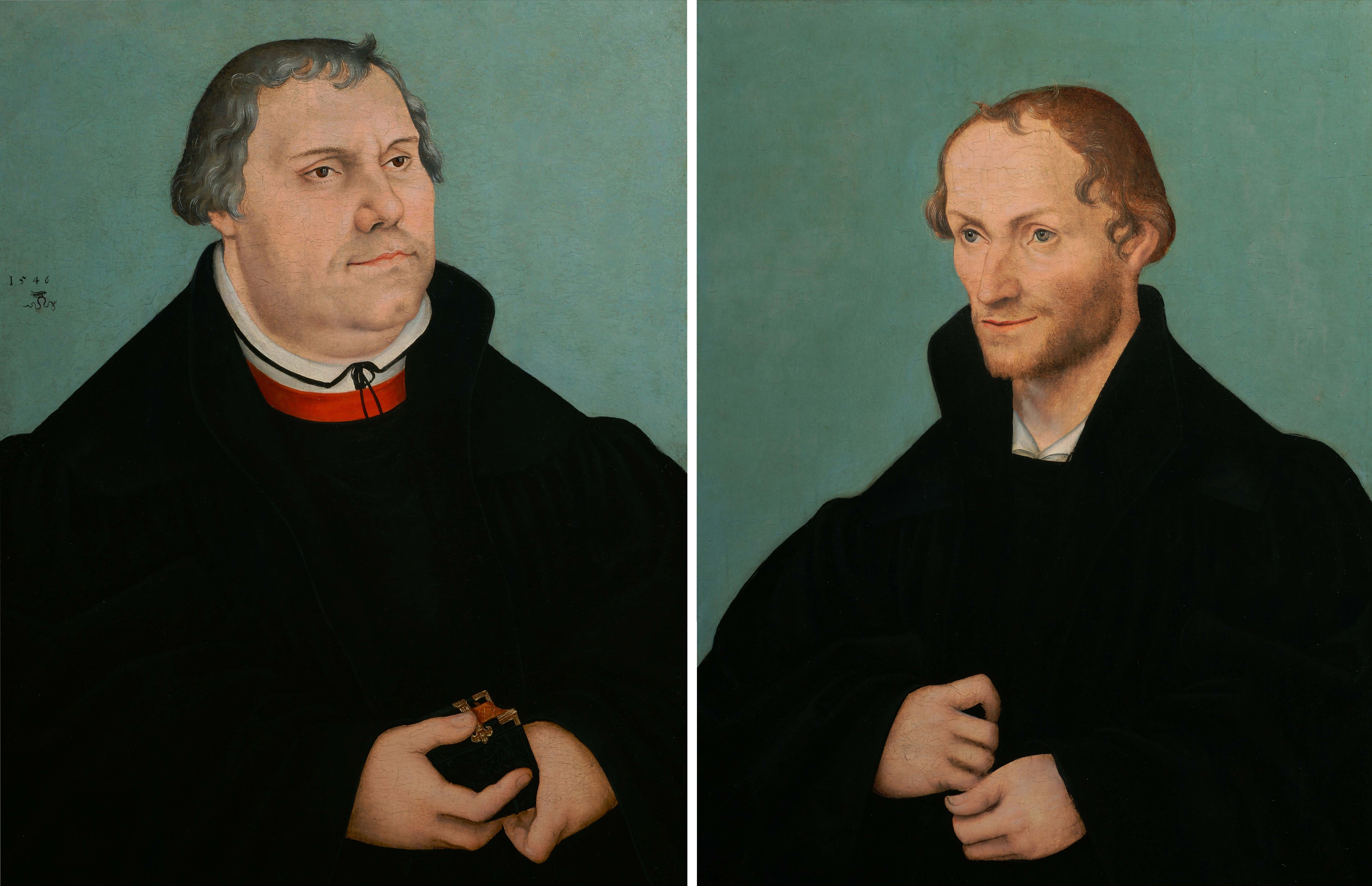
