= Mekhlu Baba =

17th-century heresiarch

Mekhlu Baba (Armenian: Մեխլու բաբա; Azerbaijani: Mıxlı Baba) or Mekhlu Vardapet (Armenian: Մեխլու վարդապետ) was an early 17th-century anti-clerical leader of a movement in the South Caucasus. He led a heterodox movement that challenged the authority of the Armenian Church and its monastic elite, advocating redistribution of land and a return to perceived evangelical purity. His activity peaked between 1614 and 1618, and his movement attracted the support of marginalised groups, rural communities, and segments of the New Julfa mercantile elite.

== Early life and ordination ==
His original name and birth date is unknown. According to the chronicler Zakaria of Kanaker, he was born in Ganja and was an ethnic Udi. He was described as a person with blue sunken eyes, a long and sharp nose, a freckled and pockmarked face, a reddish and thin beard, large and sparse teeth, short of stature and sharp-headed. According to Nerses Akinian's calculations, he entered the Catholicosate of Aghvank after 1606, under Catholicos Hovhannes of Gandzasar, who was confirmed by Shah Abbas I (r. 1588-1629) that year. He was trained at the clerical school in Gandzasar, learned psalmody and sacred music, and was ordained archdeacon. He later broke with the Church, was defrocked, and turned against the ecclesiastical order that had educated him.

He later returned to his native Ganja. There, he shaved his head and beard, changed his appearance, and presented himself before local governor Davud Khan, whom Zakaria equated with Daud Khan Undiladze, a Safavid-appointed beylerbey of Ganja-Karabakh. According to him, Mekhlu falsely claimed he had been punished by the Catholicos for preaching in the name of the Islamic prophet Muhammad, which was seen as a fabrication intended to provoke Muslim outrage against the Armenian Church. Davud Khan summoned Catholicos Hovhannes and ordered that Mekhlu’s ecclesiastical rank and clerical garments be restored, and gave him official permission to preach.

== Doctrines and movement ==
Following his excommunication, Mekhlu presented himself as a vardapet without Church sanction. He adopted a deliberately provocative appearance — fashioning himself as a Christ-like figure, wearing a goat-hair cloak fastened by two nails, from which he earned the name Mekhlu (from Persian: میخ, romanized: mêx, lit. 'nail' + Ajem-Turkic: ـلو-, lit. 'with') Baba by Muslims or Mekhlu Vardapet by Armenians. He assembled a sect which grew to over 500 members. He selected 12 armed lieutenants, modelled on the apostles, who accompanied him with swords and staffs. According to Zakaria, his sect had Turkic followers as well.

He also compiled a book of his teachings, called "Book of Collections" (Armenian: Ժողովածու Գիրք, romanized: Žoġovacu Girkʻ) which included ideas like denial of clerical authority, especially of celibate monks (assertion that only married priests could properly celebrate the liturgy); rejection of Doctrine of Incarnation; Veneration of Cross, rejection of monastic landholding; emphasis on communal ownership and moral purity, as well as denunciation of wealth and luxury among the clergy. He refused food, clothing, or gifts, citing Gospel verses like "Take neither gold nor silver" and publicly humiliated monks. He was described by authors as a charismatic figure, who was eloquent in flattery, fast-talking and articulate.

Reportedly, merchants from New Julfa supported Mekhlu, both ideologically and politically. According to Grigor Daranaghtsi, they secured firmans from Shah Abbas and local khans, granting Mekhlu authority to act against vardapets, bishops, and monks throughout South Caucasus and Iran. His enemies accused him of abusing these decrees to assault clergy and seize monastic property. According to Nerses Akinian, his rise coincided with the plague years of 1615–1621, particularly severe in Yerevan in 1618. Movement exploited public fear, threatening villages that refused to expel their clergy with divine punishment or outbreaks of disease.

Zakaria records that Mekhlu’s preaching so deeply influenced his followers that some believed killing a monk could lead them to salvation. One such man, Hakob Tutakents from Kanaker, approached Mekhlu to confess his sins and ask for absolution. Mekhlu instructed him to murder a monk and bring back his flesh and blood, saying he would consume them as part of a liturgical ritual and, after resurrecting the victim in forty days, grant the man forgiveness. A similar claim was made a few centuries ago by Smbat Zarehavantsi, leader of Tondrakians. His movement soon reached Armenian populated regions of Syunik, Ayrarat, and Gegharkunik.

In 1618, Mekhlu and his followers descended into Yerevan through Nork, aiming to gain official recognition from Amir-Guna Khan, the beylerbey of Chokhur-e Sa'd. The khan, initially mistaking the procession for an invading army, confronted Mekhlu. When asked what his group intended, Mekhlu replied that he is preaching truth. He claimed spiritual gifts and performed dramatic public gestures, including simulated flight from the walls of Erivan Fortress, saying that he intended to go to heaven. Armenian church accused him of blasphemy, heresy, manipulation of the ignorant, and fomenting social chaos. Formal letters were sent to warn communities and denounce his movement as a dangerous aberration.

Upon meeting Amir-Guna Khan, Mekhlu opened his own scripture and read aloud his proof-text. The khan turned to regional priest Avetis, who accused Mekhlu of being "False Christ". Mekhlu was immediately arrested and thrown into a cistern, with the intent to drown him. He was rescued half-drowned, at Avetis' intercession, on the condition that he leave Safavid territory permanently.

== Exile and disappearance ==
Escorted as far as the Nig district and exiled, Mekhlu travelled to Erzurum, declaring his intent to reach Jerusalem. However, he was intercepted by local Armenian clergy in Kiğı who forcibly tore off his monastic headdress and mantle. Arriving in Jerusalem, multiple complaints were submitted to Grigor Paron-Ter, who had Mekhlu imprisoned. He was released only after extensive pleas by Armenian pilgrims. From there, he reached Aleppo, and later Diyarbakir, brought by a merchant called Safar from Bayburt. According to Zakaria, he vanished from historical records later. However, he might have died c. 1640. Zakaria noted that his followers later spread the rumour that when Amir Guna Khan struck him with his staff, the Khan’s face became distorted and his hands went limp.

== Legacy ==
His movement was likened to Tondrakians and claimed to have been influenced by dualism. In Armenian clerical narratives, Mekhlu is portrayed as a deranged, demon-possessed heretic who disrupted ecclesiastical order, persecuted clergy, and incited chaos under a false messianic persona. His violence and defiance are depicted as threats to spiritual and communal stability.

In contrast, the Soviet-era Armenian and Azerbaijani reinterpretations transformed Mekhlu into a popular leader of early peasant resistance against feudal exploitation in the early 17th century. His attacks on monasteries and clergy are no longer seen as heresy or sacrilege but rather as legitimate protests against the concentration of land and power in the hands of spiritual and secular feudal elites. The Armenian Soviet Encyclopedia entry emphasised his advocacy for the redistribution of monastic lands to village communities and his demand for property equality, framing him as an early class-conscious agitator. His symbolic attire of goat-hair rags fastened with two nails which was formerly seen as theatrical blasphemy, was reinterpreted as a conscious rejection of clerical luxury and hierarchy.

The Soviet Azerbaijani version further emphasised his multi-ethnic support base of Armenians, Udis, and Azerbaijanis and framed his anti-clerical campaign in Karabakh and Ganja as part of a broader anti-feudal uprising. His later persecution by the Armenian Catholicos and forced exile from Yerevan is presented not as a triumph of order over heresy, but as the suppression of a progressive movement by religious and political authorities aligned with Safavid interests.

== Sources ==
- Zakʻaria (2004). Bournoutian, George A. (ed.). The chronicle of deacon Zakʻaria of Kʻanakʻer. Armenian studies series. Costa Mesa, California: Mazda Publishers. ISBN 978-1-56859-121-6.
