= Battle of Sufiyan =

1605 Safavid victory over the Ottomans

- Part of the Ottoman–Safavid War of 1603–1618
Date	6 November 1605
Location	Sufiyan, near Tabriz
Result	Safavid victory

Belligerents
Safavid Iran	Ottoman Empire

Commanders and leaders
(Safavid Iran) Shah Abbas (Safavid Iran) Allahverdi Khan (Safavid Iran) Qarachaqay Beg (Safavid Iran) Amir-Guna Khan	(Ottoman Empire) Cığalazade Yusuf (Ottoman Empire) Köse Sefer Pasha (executed) (Ottoman Empire) Tekkeli Mehmed (Ottoman Empire) Karakaş Pasha (Ottoman Empire) Kaçar Mehmed Pasha

Strength
~60,000	~100,000 (including large amount of janissaries)

Casualties and losses
Unknown	~20,000 killed

The Battle of Sufiyan (Note: Also transliterated as "Sufian".) (Persian: نبرد صوفيان) took place on 6 November 1605, during the Ottoman–Safavid War of 1603–1618. The Safavids, under King (Shah) Abbas I (r. 1588–1629), beat a numerically superior, fully-fledged Ottoman army. It was one of King Abbas I's greatest military victories. According to Colin Imber: "For the Ottomans the battle of Sufiyan was a greater disaster than anything they had experienced in Hungary, where the war which had begun in 1593 had revealed Ottoman military deficiencies in the face of new European weapons and tactics."

== Prelude ==
In 1603, Abbas I recaptured Tabriz and Nakhchivan from the Ottomans, territories which the Safavids had been forced to cede in 1590. In the same year, the Ottomans were already fighting on two fronts—in Hungary against the Habsburgs and in Anatolia against the Jelalis. Abbas I proceeded to recover Erivan the next year, in June 1604. In the same month, the Ottomans dispatched Cığalazade Yusuf Sinan Pasha (hereafter, simply "Sinan Pasha") from Constantinople, Istanbul, towards Erzurum with a large number of janissaries to fight Abbas and his men. Around the time of Sinan Pasha's march, Abbas I had reached Kars, at the frontier of Georgia. He ordered the destruction of the countryside between Kars and Erzurum, employing similar scorched earth tactics his grandfather Tahmasp I (r. 1524–1576) had employed against the Ottomans. When Abbas realized that Sinan Pasha did not intend to spend the winter in the region before continuing the campaign in the spring and was therefore moving straight towards Kars, he ordered the immediate mass evacuation "of the entire population, most of them Armenian Christians, over a wide area to the north of the Aras River, and embracing the three towns of Erivan, Nakhichivan and [Old] Julfa".

By November 1604, the Turks led by Sinan Pasha reached Kars, which the Iranians had evacuated. Though Sinan Pasha wanted to continue towards Shirvan, his officers forced him to move south across the Aras. He established his winter encampment at Van, awaiting reinforcements. Safavid spies informed Abbas of Sinan Pasha's decision; he immediately ordered general Allahverdi Khan to attack the town of Van before the reinforcements could arrive. Upon reaching Van, Allahverdi Khan defeated a Kurdish force outside its citadel, a sortie of Ottoman troops inside, and routed some Ottoman troops who attempted to link up with Sinan Pasha. Sinan Pasha subsequently withdrew to Northern Mesopotamia. Allahverdi Khan returned to Abbas I with the severed heads of defeated Ottomans. These were paraded at the battlefield of Chaldiran in a symbolic visit by Abbas. This was the very site where the first Safavid ruler, Ismail I (r. 1501–1524), Abbas's great-grandfather, suffered a defeat in 1514 at the hands of the Ottomans.

After receiving massive reinforcements, Sinan Pasha moved into Azerbaijan. Abbas's spies reported that Sinan Pasha's army was almost twice as large as his. Upon hearing this, Abbas considered withdrawing to Tabriz, as he did not want to risk losing the territories he had recovered. He considered it too dangerous attacking Sinan Pasha's army directly. Instead, he followed "a parallel route from Khoy to Marand, observing the Ottoman advance, but remaining as far as possible unobserved". He ordered the Safavid governor of Azerbaijan to adhere to the same scorched earth tactics which had been employed in 1604; all the people and food supplies were removed "from the Ottoman line of march".

== Battle ==
On the eve of the battle, Abbas and his army ascended the top of a nearby hill to make a final assessment of the Ottoman army. Though his commanders concurred with the number the spies had reported, Abbas I ordered his commanders to tell their soldiers the Ottoman army was numerically inferior to boost their confidence. Finally, Abbas I consulted his aunt Zeynab Begum, as he frequently did. She soothed his anxieties and encouraged him to fight.

On 6 November 1605, the section of the Safavid army led by Qarachaqay Beg reached the "top of rising ground" at Sufiyan, becoming visible to the Ottoman army. Remembering Abbas I's orders to avoid a major confrontation, Qarachaqay and his men retreated. Köse Sefer Pasha and some other commanders, who interpreted this as a sign of weakness, did not hesitate to launch the attack against Sinan Pasha's wishes. Abbas I led the vanguard himself whereas Allahverdi Khan led "a squadron detached from the main body of the army". As the massive central part of the Ottoman army consisting of cavalry moved towards the Iranian lines, Abbas ordered his light cavalry to "sweep around the Ottoman left flank and deliver a feint attack in the rear". Sinan Pasha became confused, thinking "this was the direction of the main Iranian attack and detached a large body of his advancing horse to meet it". This caused disorientation to both sides, "believing they were fleeing". Making use of the momentum, Abbas I threw the full weight of his Qizilbash cavalry into the battle. After some hard fighting, they scattered the "dispirited Ottomans" in all directions.

== Aftermath ==
The Safavids scored a major victory. Numerous major Ottoman governors and generals had been captured or killed as a result of the battle. Köse Sefer Pasha, who had started the battle, was captured and executed by the Safavids. One of the Ottoman captives, a man of reportedly immense stature, suddenly drew a dagger and attacked King Abbas I when he was led before him. Abbas I wrestled with the man until he dropped the dagger; he was subsequently killed by Abbas' attendants. But the Sufiyan battle entailed further important consequences. The Ottomans had launched the campaign to recover the territories they had annexed in 1590 but had lost since 1603. The Ottoman defeat at Sufiyan ensured that the Safavids were able to hold the recovered territories, and enabled Abbas I to reconquer all remaining territories by 1607. According to Roger Savory, at Sufiyan, King Abbas I "revealed himself to be a general of consummate ability, carefully husbanding his forces, which were inferior to those of the Ottomans in numbers and firepower, and throwing in his reserves at the critical moment." After the battle, in successive campaigns, he expelled "the last Ottoman soldier from Iranian territory as defined by the Treaty of Amasya". Sinan Pasha died shortly after his defeat, possibly by suicide.

== Sources ==
- Blow, David (2009). Shah Abbas: The Ruthless King Who became an Iranian Legend. London, UK: I.B. Tauris & Co. Ltd. ISBN 978-1845119898. LCCN 2009464064.
- Imber, Colin (2012). "The Battle of Sufiyan, 1605: A Symptom of Ottoman Military Decline?". In Floor, Willem; Herzig, Edmund (eds.). Iran and the World in the Safavid Age. I.B. Tauris. ISBN 978-1780769905.
- Kia, Mehrdad (2017). The Ottoman Empire: A Historical Encyclopedia (Vol. 1). ABC-CLIO. ISBN 978-1610693899.
- Savory, R.M. (1982). "ʿABBĀS I". Encyclopædia Iranica, Vol. I, Fasc. 1. pp. 71–75.
