= Silistra Eyalet =

Administrative division of the Ottoman Empire from 1593 to 1864

Province of Ochakiv Eyalet-i Silistra
- Eyalet of the Ottoman Empire
- 1593–1864
- Flag

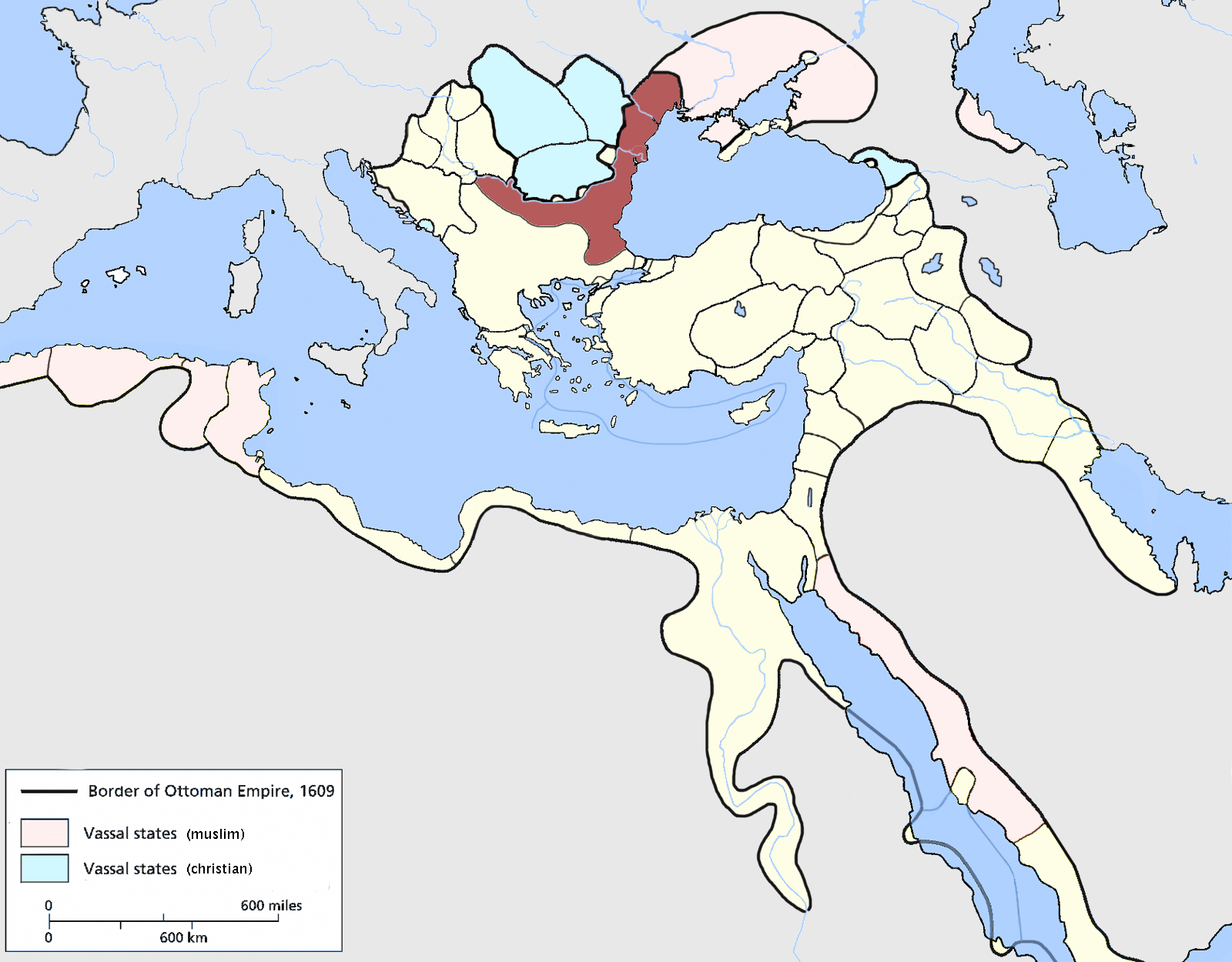
- The Silistra Eyalet in 1609
- Capital: Silistra and Özi
- Area
  - Coordinates: 44°7′N 27°16′E
  - 1856: 94,858 km^{2} (36,625 sq mi)
- History
  - Established: 1593
  - Disestablished: 1864
Preceded by	Succeeded by
Rumelia Eyalet; Kefe Eyalet	Danube Vilayet; Edirne Eyalet

The Eyalet of Silistra or Silistria (Ottoman Turkish: ایالت سیلیستره, romanized: Eyālet-i Silistre), later known as Özü Eyalet (Ottoman Turkish: ایالت اوزی, romanized: Eyālet-i Özi, lit. 'Province of Ochakiv') was an eyalet of the Ottoman Empire along the Black Sea littoral and south bank of the Danube River in southeastern Europe. The fortress of Akkerman was under the eyalet's jurisdiction. Its reported area in the 19th century was 71,140 square kilometres (27,469 sq mi).

== History ==
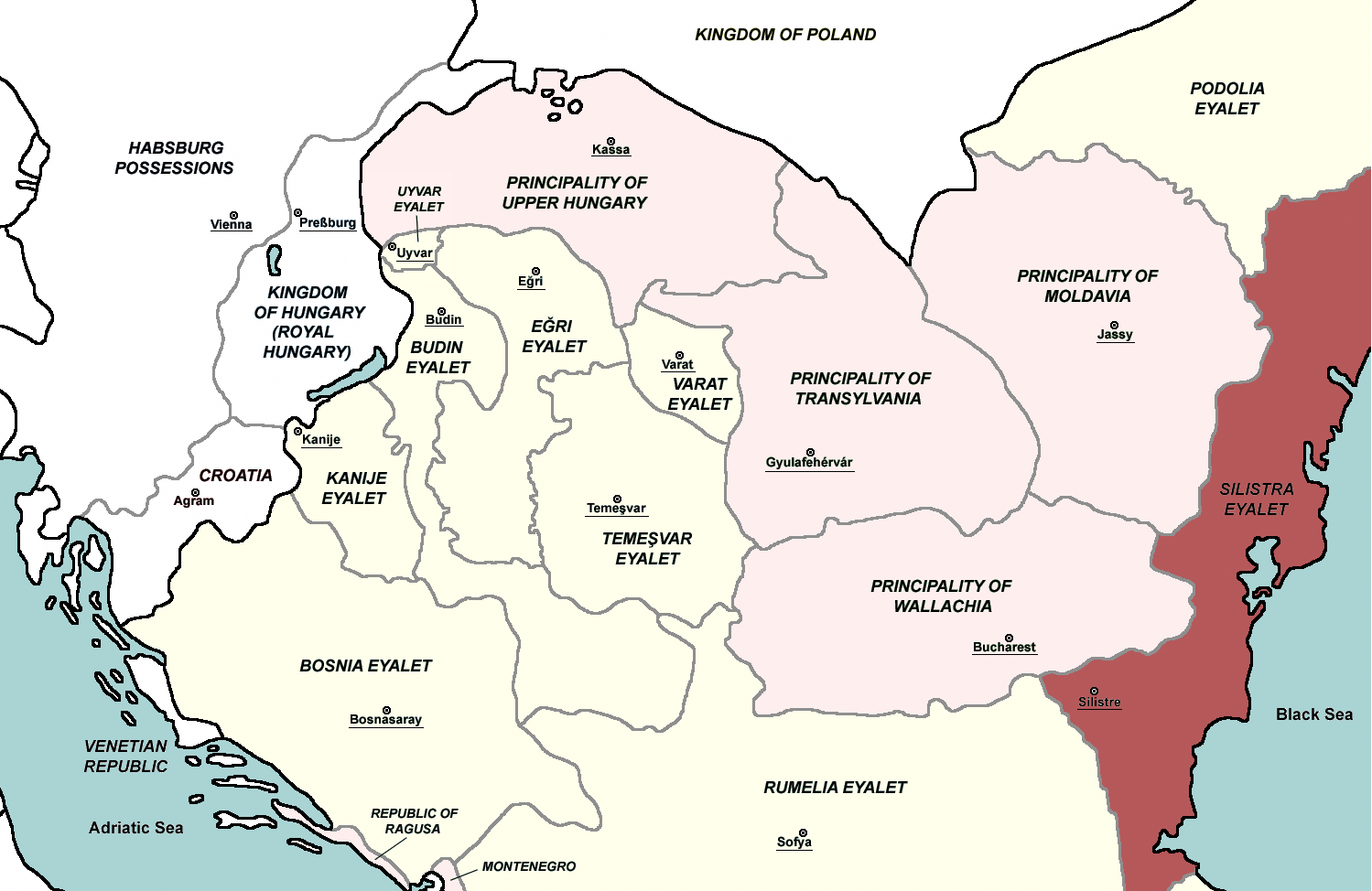
Silistra Eyalet, 1683

The Eyalet of Silistra was formed in 1593 as beylerbeylik of Özi (Ukrainian: Очаків, Očakiv) from territory of the former Principality of Karvuna, later Dobruja, Silistra was originally the Silistra Sanjak of Rumelia Eyalet.

It was named after Silistra, since its governor often resided in this Danubian fortress. Around 1599, it was expanded and raised to the level of an eyalet likely as a benefit to its first governor-general (beylerbeyi), the khan of Crimea. It was centered on the regions of Dobruja, Budjak (Ottoman Bessarabia), and Yedisan and included the towns of Varna, Kustendja (Constanța), Akkerman (Bilhorod-Dnistrovskyi), and Khadjibey (Odesa) with its capital at the fortresses of Silistra (now in Bulgaria) or Özi (now Ochakiv in Ukraine).

In the 17th century, Silistra Eyalet was expanded to the south and west to include most of modern Bulgaria and European Turkey including the towns of Adrianople (Edirne), Filibe (Plovdiv), and Vidin. In the late 17th and early 18th centuries, a series of Russo-Turkish Wars truncated the eyalet in the east with Russia eventually annexing all of Yedisan and Budjak to the Danube by 1812.

Edirne Eyalet was constituted from south of Silistra Eyalet in 1830. With Ottoman administrative reforms of 1864 the Silistra Eyalet was reconstituted as the Danube Vilayet.

== Administrative division ==
Evliya Çelebi mentioned in his book (Seyahatnâme) that the Silistra or Özi Eyalet had ten sanjaks:

1. Niğbolu Sanjak (Nikopol)
2. Çirmen Sanjak (Ormenio)
3. Vize Sanjak (Vize)
4. Kırk Kilise Sanjak (Kırklareli)
5. Bender Sanjak (Bender)
6. Akkerman Sanjak (Bilhorod-Dnistrovskyi)
7. Özi-Kale Sanjak (Ochakiv)
8. Kılburun Sanjak (Kinburn)
9. Doğan Sanjak (Beryslav)
10. Silistre Sanjak (Silistra)

According to Sancak Tevcih Defteri, eyalet consisted of eight sanjaks between 1700 and 1730 as follows:

1. Sanjak of Özi (Paşa Sancağı, Dnieper), centered at Özi-Kale (Ochakiv)
2. Sanjak of Silistre (Silistra)
3. Sanjak of Vidin (Vidin)
4. Sanjak of Niğbolu (Nikopol)
5. Sanjak of Kırk Kilise (Kırklareli)
6. Sanjak of Çirmen (Ormenio)
7. Sanjak of Vize (Vize)
8. Sanjak of Tağan Geçidi (Beryslav) (until 1699)

Sanjaks in the early 19th century:

1. Sanjak of Niğbolu
2. Sanjak of Çirmen (after 1829, its capital was Edirne)
3. Sanjak of Vize
4. Sanjak of Kırk Kilise
5. Sanjak of Akkerman, which was only a military command in Bilhorod (Akkerman) in the Budzhak
6. Sanjak of Vidin

== Beylerbeys ==
- 1615? - ? Iskender Pasha
- 1621–1623 Khan Temir
- 1630-1632 - Damat Murtaza Pasha
- Late Spring 1632 - 1634 Abaza Mehmed Pasha
- c.1657 Melek Ahmed Pasha
- c.1683 Mustafa Pasha

== Bibliography ==
- Kołodziejczyk, Dariusz (2011). The Crimean Khanate and Poland-Lithuania: International Diplomacy on the European Periphery (15th-18th Century). A Study of Peace Treaties Followed by Annotated Documents. Leiden: Brill. ISBN 9789004191907. Archived from the original on 2017-06-30.
