= St. Elizabeth's Church, Wrocław =

Church in Wrocław, Poland

Coordinates: 51°6′42″N 17°1′48″E

St. Elizabeth's Church
- Bazylika św. Elżbiety
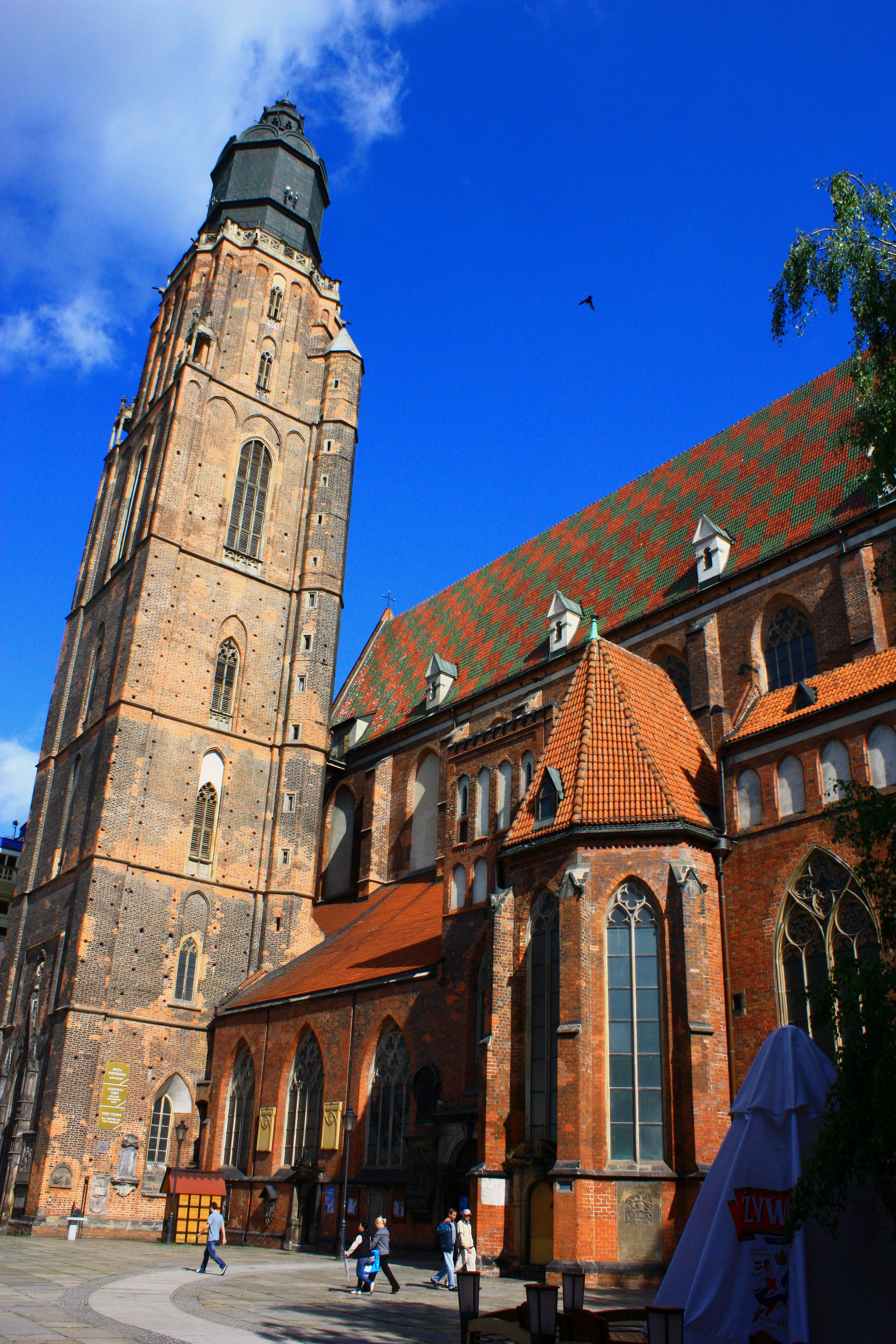
- St Elizabeth's Church, Wrocław

Religion
- Affiliation: Roman Catholic
- Diocese: Old Town

Location
- Location: Wrocław, Poland
- Interactive map of St. Elizabeth's Church

Architecture
- Style: Gothic
- Completed: 14th century

Specifications
- Height (max): 91.5 m
- Materials: Brick

Historic Monument of Poland
- Designated: 1994-09-08
- Part of: Wrocław – historic city center
- Reference no.: M.P. 1994 nr 50 poz. 425

St. Elizabeth's Church (Polish: Bazylika św. Elżbiety) is a Brick Gothic church of the Catholic Third Order of Saint Francis located in Wrocław, Poland. It is Wrocław's second tallest and one of the most recognisable churches which dominates the Old Town panorama.

== History ==
The structure dates back to the 14th century, when construction was commissioned by the city. The main tower was originally 130 meters tall. From 1525 until 1946, St. Elizabeth's was the chief Lutheran Church of Wrocław and Silesia and the principal congregation of the Evangelical Church of Prussia in Breslau. The last sermon in German was given on June 30, 1946, paying tribute to the loss of home.

In 1946 it was expropriated and given to the Military Chaplaincy of the Polish Roman Catholic Church. In the context of degermanization of the lands acquired by Poland, the church's Madonna figure as well as other sculptures were deported to Warsaw. Polish politicians saw such acts as part of recompensation for Nazi war crimes.

The church was damaged by heavy hail in 1529, and gutted by fire in 1976. The church's renowned organ was destroyed. The reconstructed main tower is now 91.5 meters tall. An observation deck near the top is open to the public. Since 1999 there is a memorial on the church property to Pastor Dietrich Bonhoeffer, a native of the city (then Breslau, Germany) and martyr to the anti-Nazi Cause.

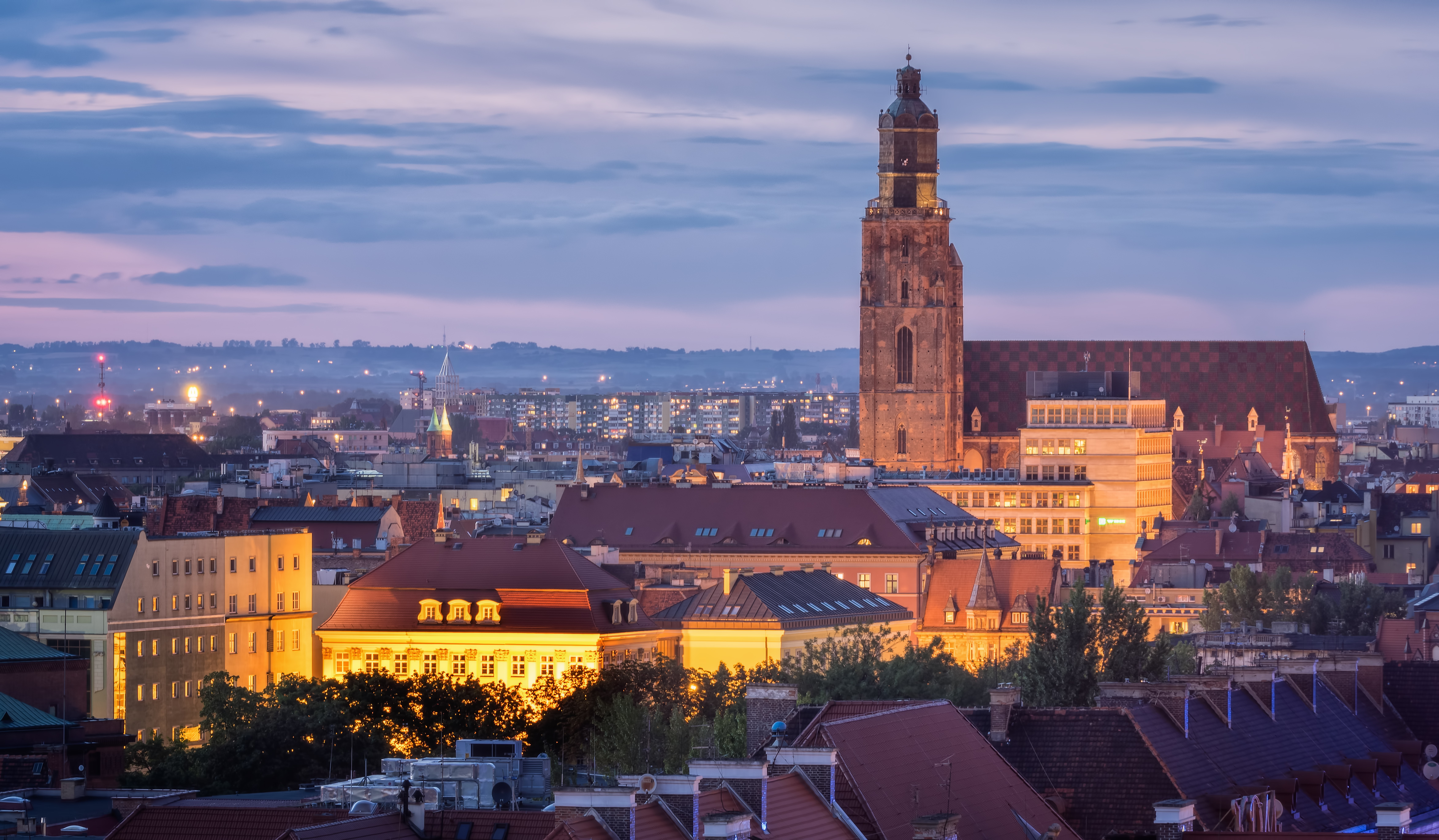
Panoramic view of St. Elisabeth Church

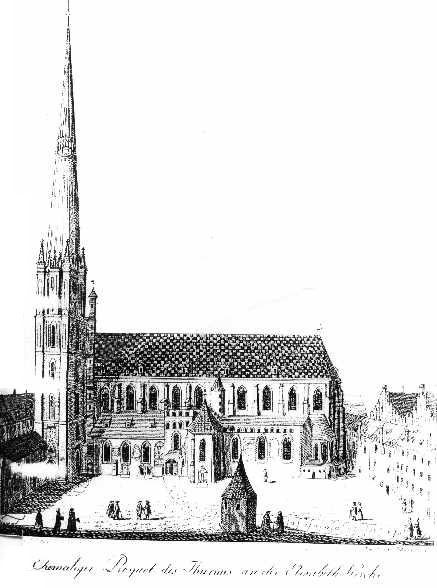
St. Elisabeth Church, 14th century, with 130 m spire

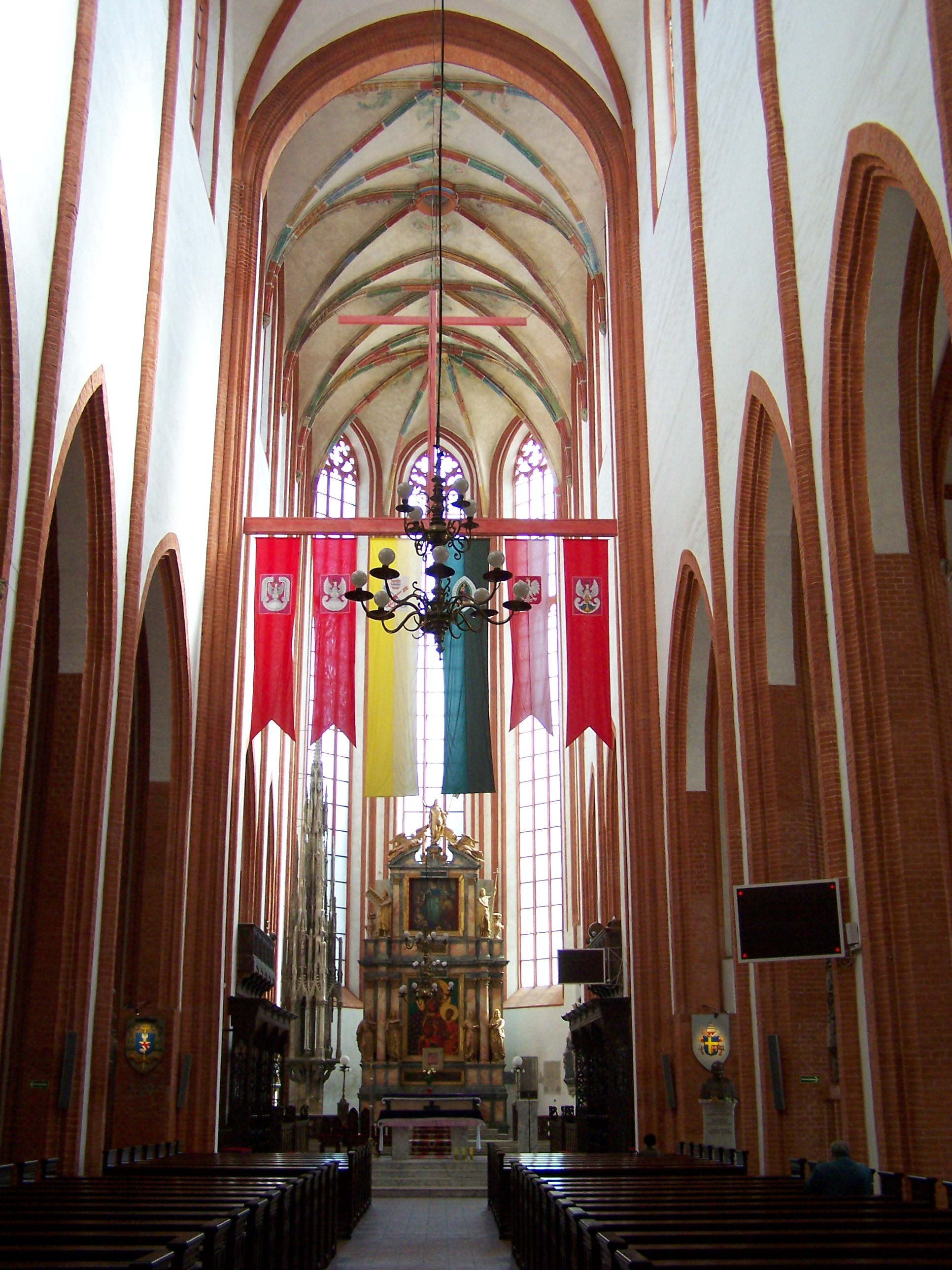
Interior

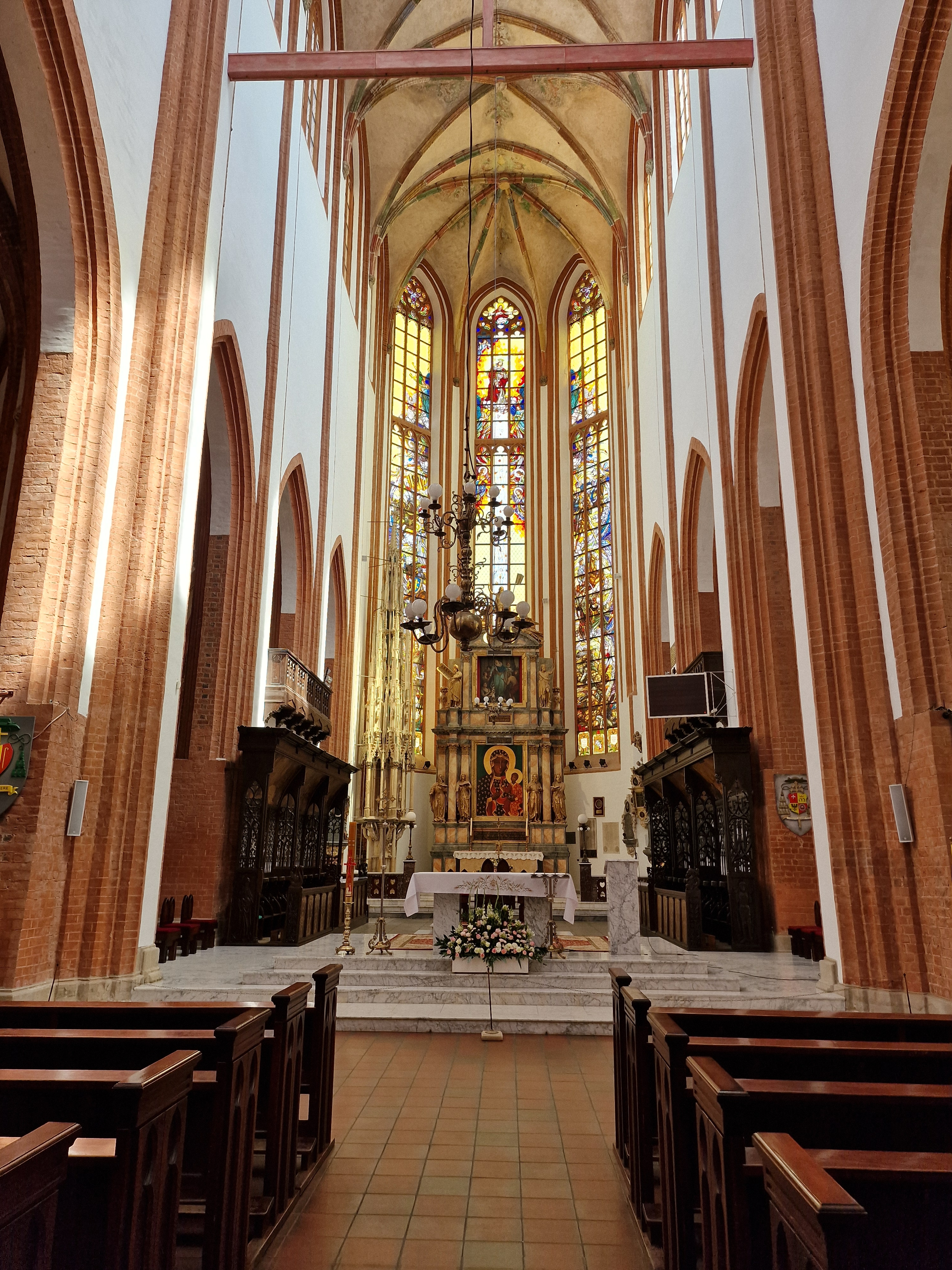
Altar

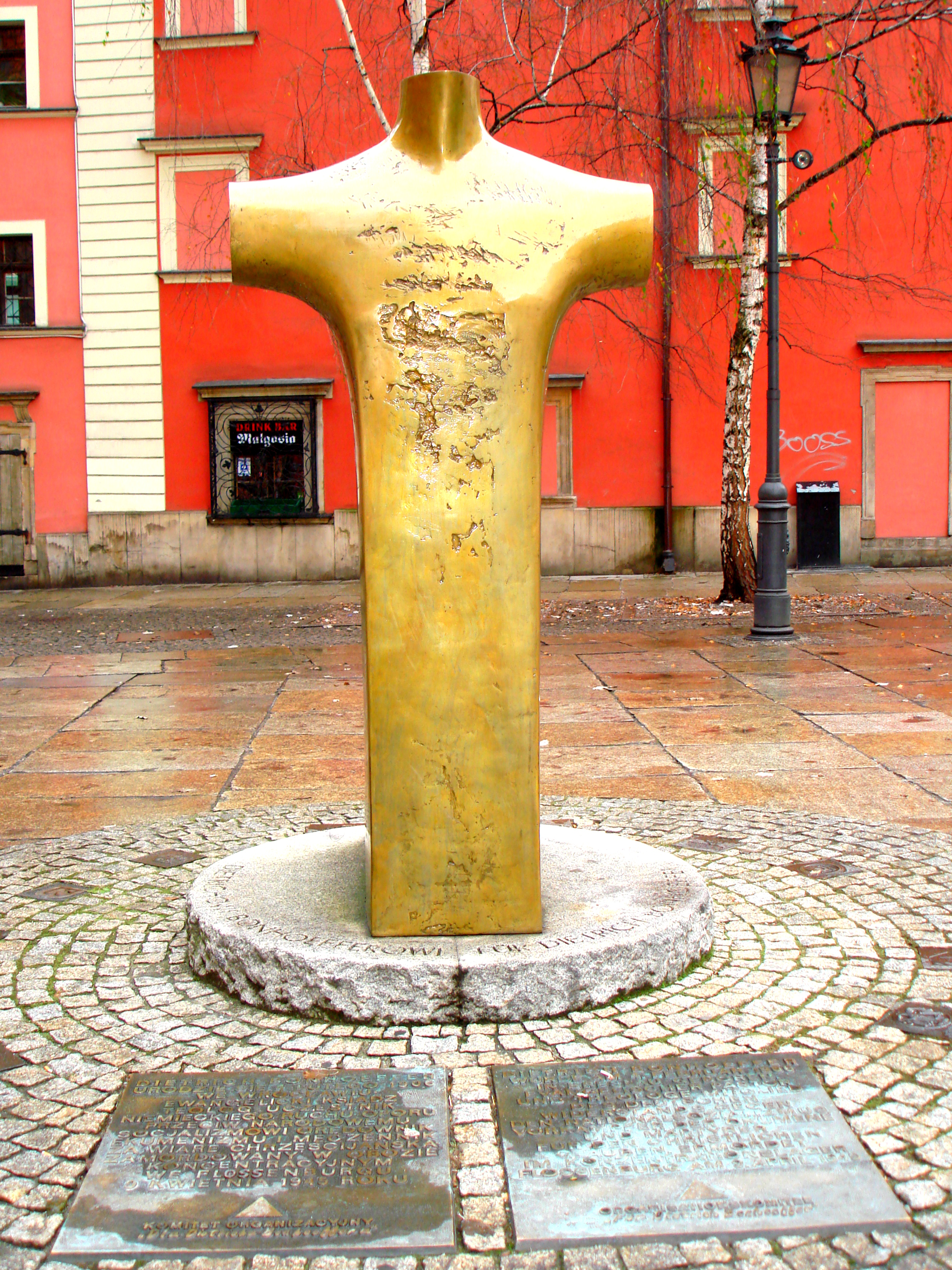
Memorial of Dietrich Bonhoeffer

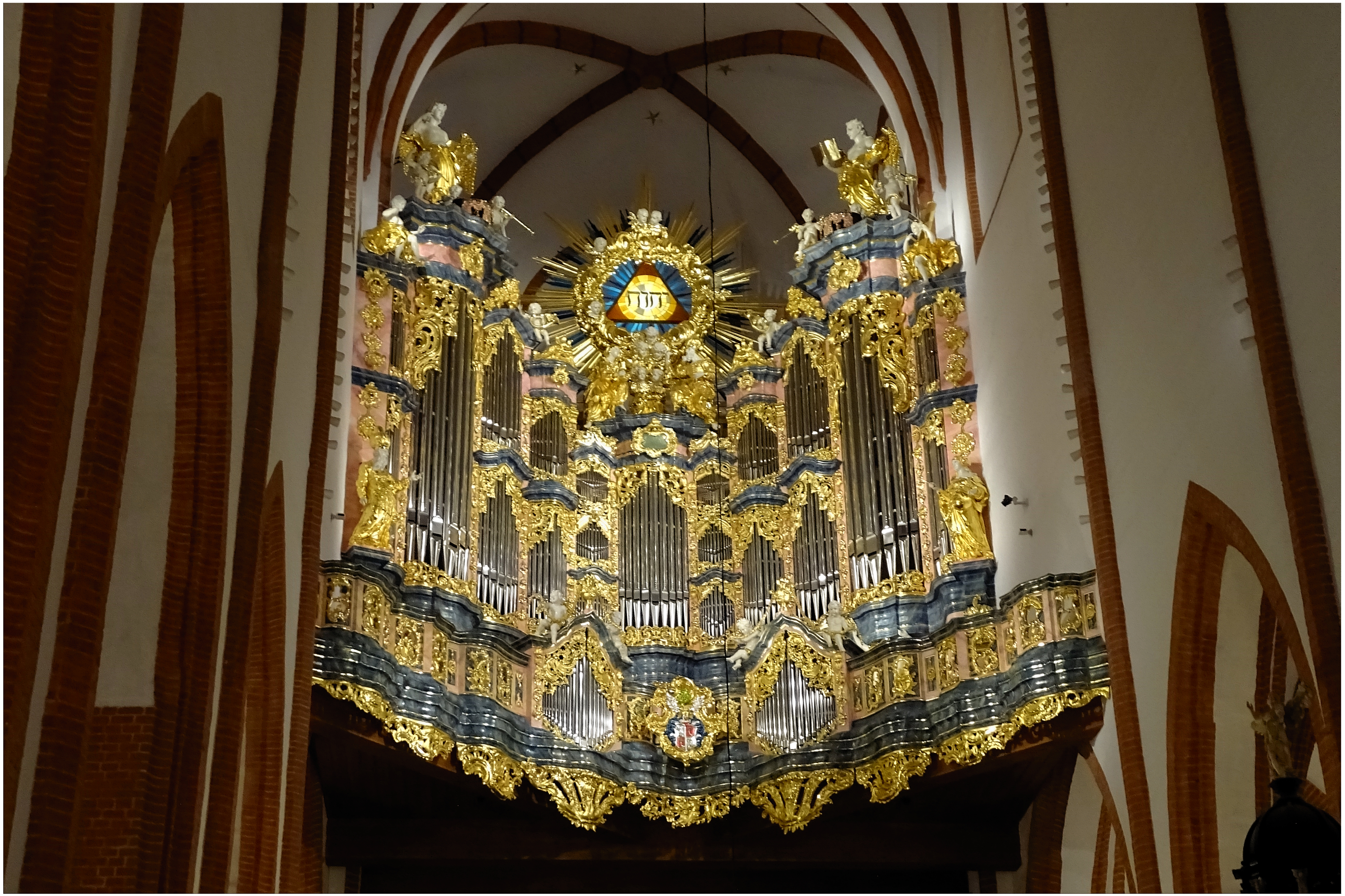
The reconstructed Engler organ

== Gallery ==
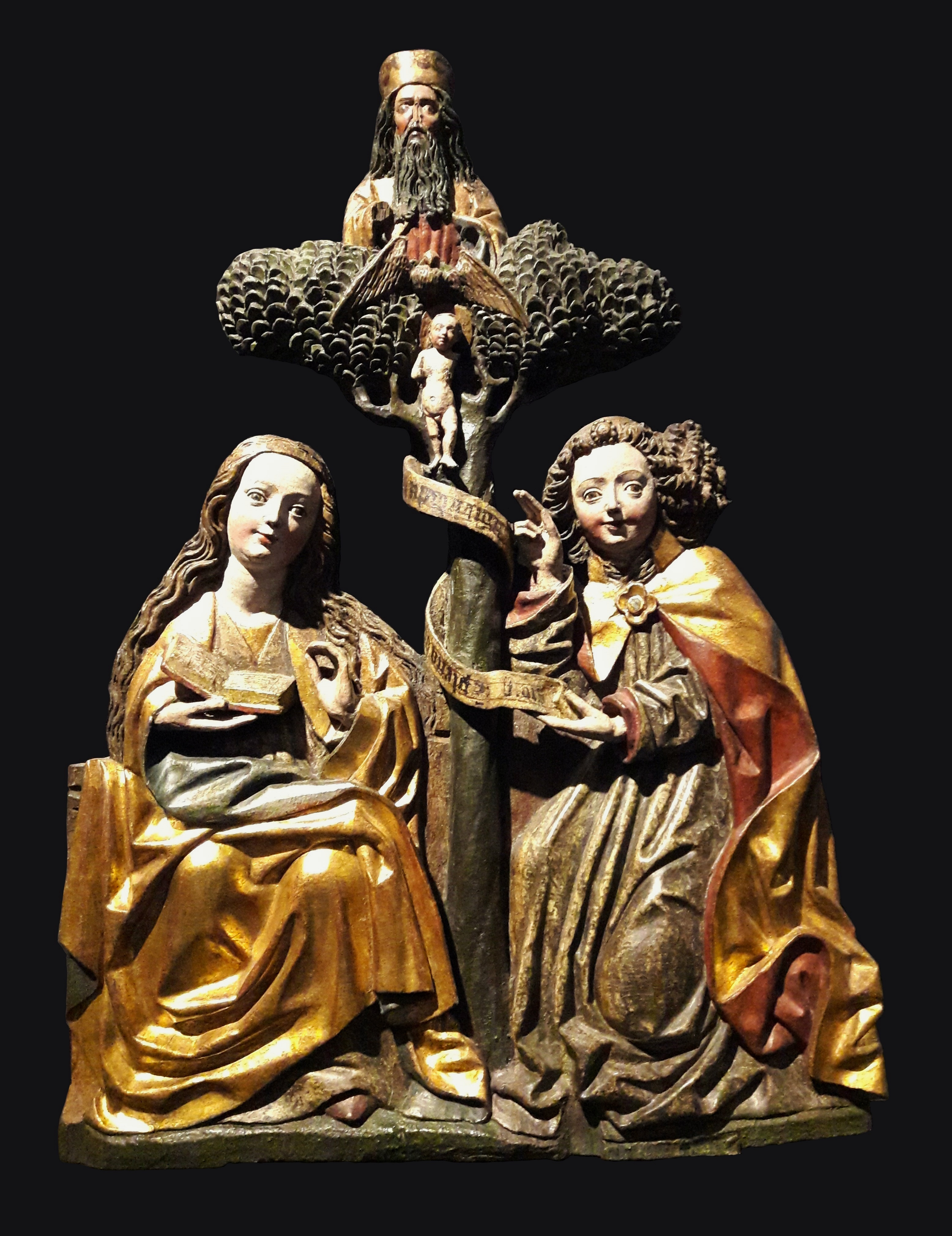
Annunciation with the Trinity, circa 1480, National Museum in Warsaw collection since 1946.

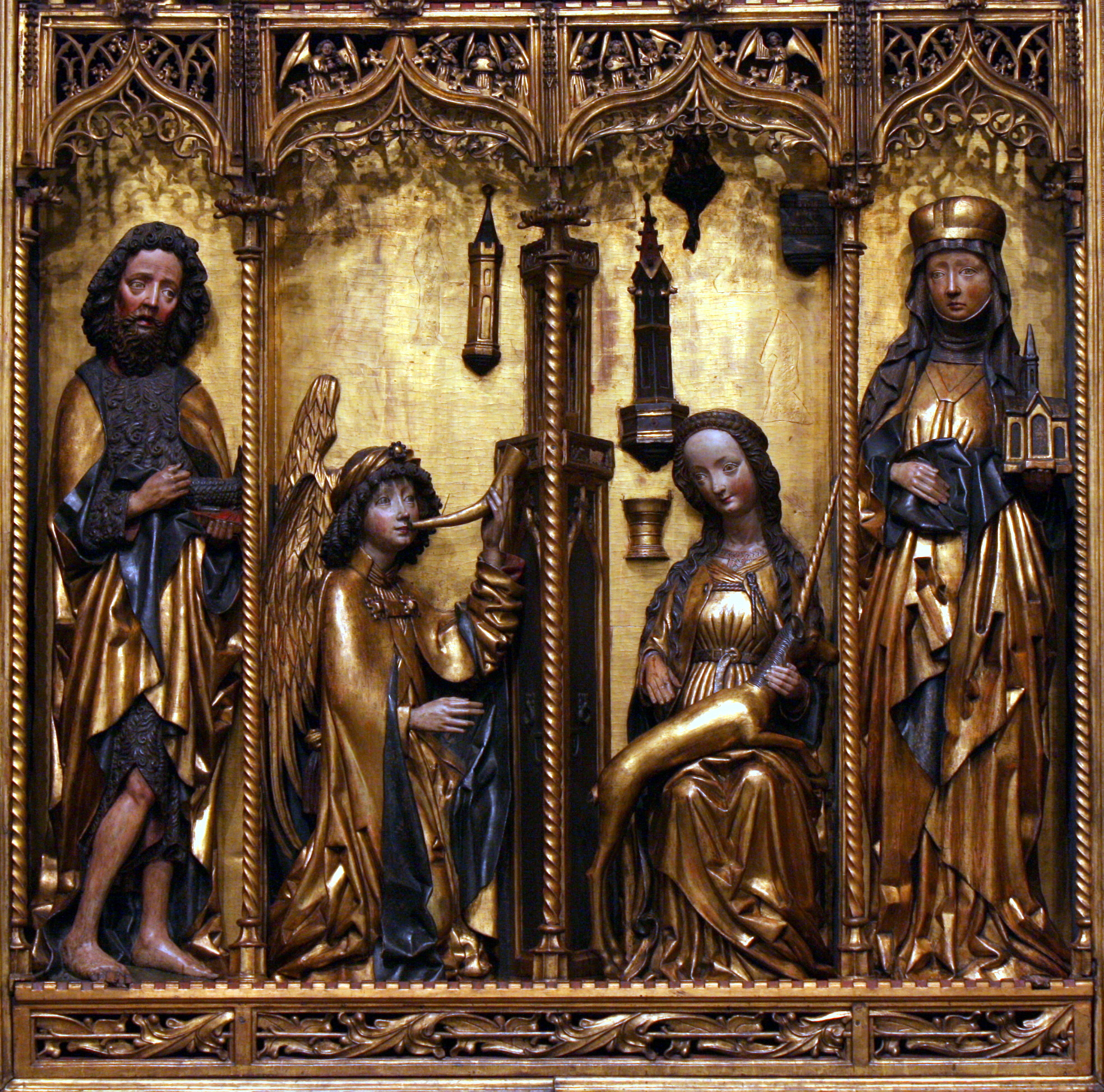
Master of the Annunciation with Unicorn Polyptych, National Museum in Warsaw collection since 1946.

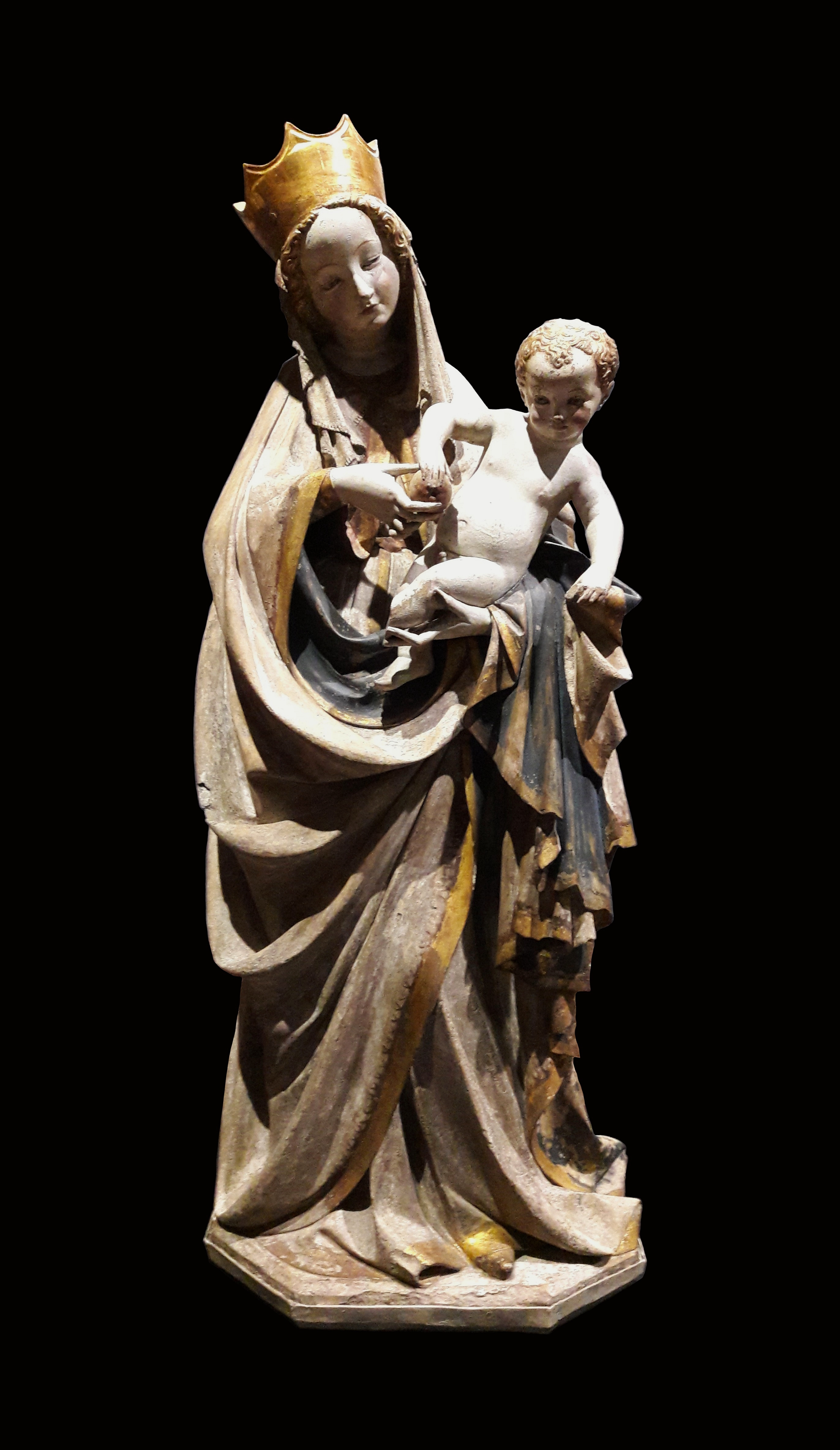
Madonna and Child (Beautiful Madonna), circa 1390, National Museum in Warsaw collection since 1946.

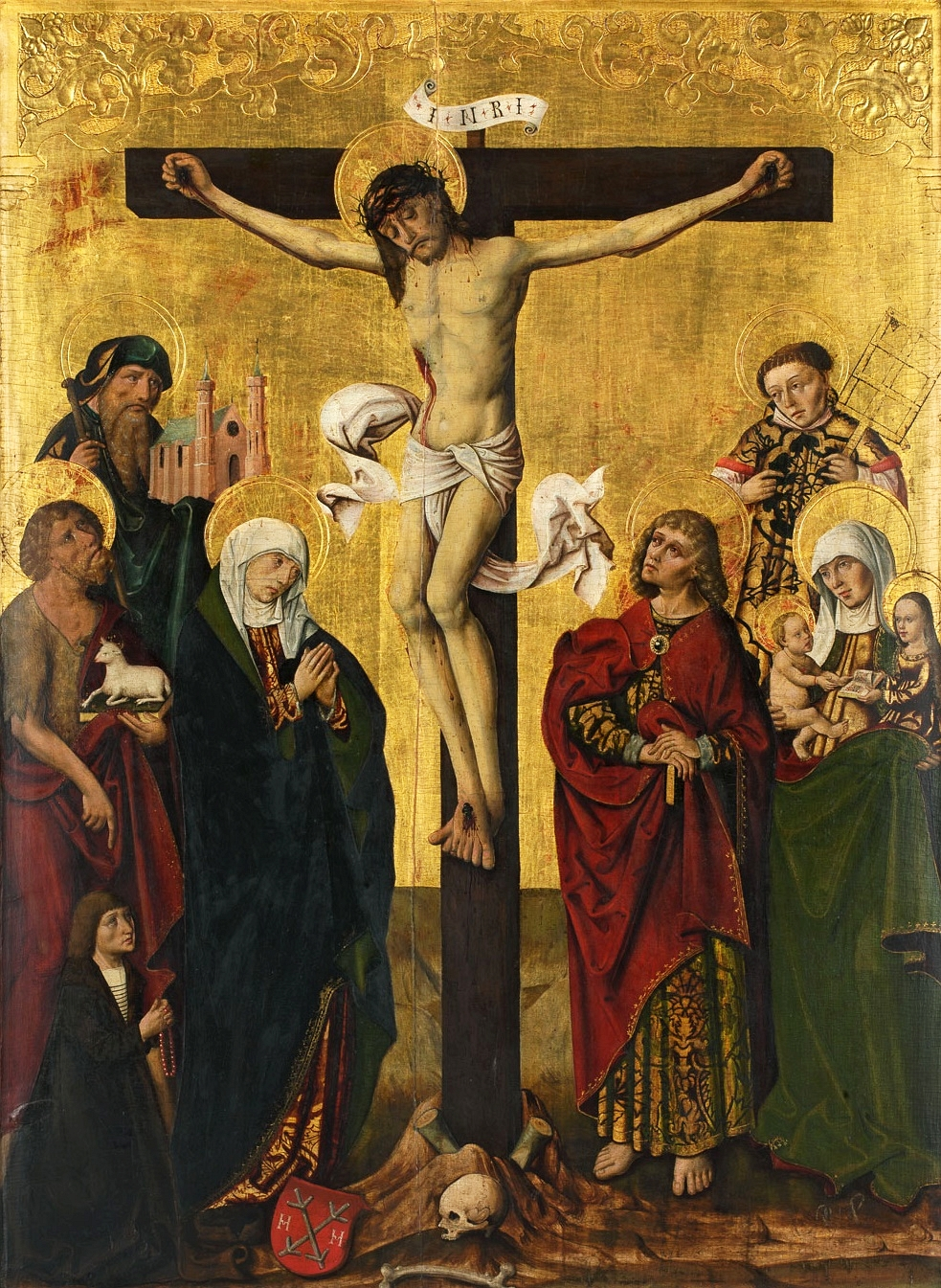
Epitaph of Hans Hölczel, circa 1512, National Museum in Warsaw collection since 1946.

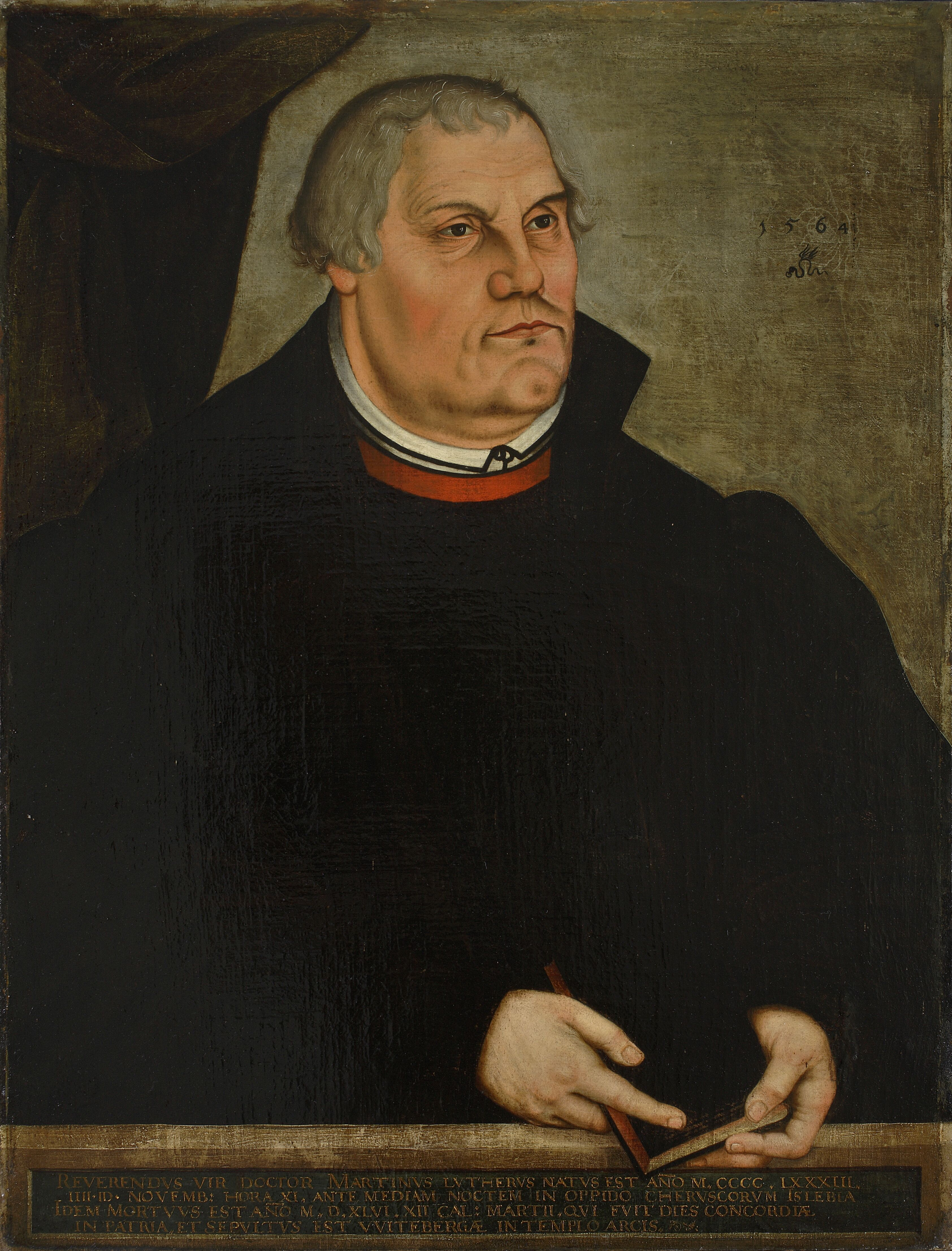
Portrait of Martin Luther, 1564, workshop of Lucas Cranach the Younger, National Museum in Warsaw collection since 1946.

== See also ==
- List of tallest churches
- 16th-century Western domes
