= Ibrahimpur, SBS Nagar =

Ibrahimpur
- Village
- Location in Punjab, India Ibrahimpur (India)
- Coordinates: 31.0107939°N 76.0549654°E
- Country: India
- State: Punjab
- District: Shaheed Bhagat Singh Nagar

Government
  - Type: Panchayat raj
  - Body: Gram panchayat
- Elevation: 254 m (833 ft)

Population (2011)
  - Total: 115
- Sex ratio 62/53 ♂/♀

Languages
  - Official: Punjabi
- Time zone: UTC+5:30 (IST)
- PIN: 144517
- Telephone code: 01823
- ISO 3166 code: IN-PB
- Post office: Kahlon
- Website: nawanshahr.nic.in

Ibrahimpur is a village in Shaheed Bhagat Singh Nagar district of Punjab State, India. It is located 7.8 kilometres (4.8 mi) away from Rahon, 15 kilometres (9.3 mi) from Nawanshahr, 16 kilometres (9.9 mi) from district headquarter Shaheed Bhagat Singh Nagar and 97 kilometres (60 mi) from state capital Chandigarh. The village is administrated by Sarpanch an elected representative of the village.

== Demography ==
As of 2011, Ibrahimpur has a total number of 22 houses and population of 115 of which 62 include are males while 53 are females according to the report published by Census India in 2011. The literacy rate of Ibrahimpur is 60.78%, lower than the state average of 75.84%. The population of children under the age of 6 years is 13 which is 11.30% of total population of Ibrahimpur, and child sex ratio is approximately 1600 as compared to Punjab state average of 846.

Most of the people are from Schedule Caste which constitutes 46.96% of total population in Ibrahimpur. The town does not have any Schedule Tribe population so far.

As per the report published by Census India in 2011, 40 people were engaged in work activities out of the total population of Ibrahimpur which includes 38 males and 2 females. According to census survey report 2011, 97.50% workers describe their work as main work and 2.50% workers are involved in Marginal activity providing livelihood for less than 6 months.

== Education ==
KC Engineering College and Doaba Khalsa Trust Group Of Institutions are the nearest colleges. Industrial Training Institute for women (ITI Nawanshahr) is 16 kilometres (9.9 mi) and Lovely Professional University is 60 kilometres (37 mi) away from the village.

== Transport ==
Banga railway station is the nearest train station however, Garhshankar Junction railway station is 4 kilometres (2.5 mi) away from the village. Sahnewal Airport is the nearest domestic airport which located 55 kilometres (34 mi) away in Ludhiana and the nearest international airport is located in Chandigarh also Sri Guru Ram Dass Jee International Airport is the second nearest airport which is 158 kilometres (98 mi) away in Amritsar.

== See also ==
- List of villages in India
