= Amir-Guna Khan Qajar =

Safavid governor of Erivan from 1604 to 1625

- امیر گونه خان قاجار

Governor of Chokhur-e Sa'd
- In office 1604–1625
- Appointed by: Abbas the Great
- Preceded by: Mehmed Sherif Pasha
- Succeeded by: Tahmaspqoli Khan Qajar

Personal details
- Born: c. 1536
- Died: 1625 (aged 88–89) Erivan, Chokhur-e Sa'd, Safavid Empire

Military service
- Battles/wars: Ottoman–Safavid war (1603–1612); Battle of Sufiyan; Battle of Marabda

Amir-Guna Khan Qajar (Persian: امیر گونه خان قاجار, romanized: Amīr Gūna Khān Qājār; c. 1536 – October 1625) was a Safavid official, governor of Chokhur-e Sa'd region (Erivan province) of Safavid Empire from Qajar tribe. As the governor, he oversaw and implemented the Great Surgun, the mass deportation of Armenians, on the orders of Shah Abbas.

== Background ==
According to Iskandar Beg Munshi, he was from the Aqcha Qoyunlu clan of the Qajar tribe. His father was Gulabi beg Aqcha Qoyunlu who was a qurchi. He had several brothers - Husain Quli beg (head of Safavid cannon corps, d. 1609/1610) and Alpan Beg (chief of some tofangchis). He may had a brother called Shahqoli who was an ancestor of Qajar dynasty.

== Career ==
He started his career as a butler of the harem, but he later became darugha (prefect) of Qazvin. Joining Abbas the Great's army during Ottoman–Safavid war in 1603, he led his contingent to Tabriz on 15 September 1603. After brutal takeover of the city on 21 October 1603, he was sent to Arasbaran and Karabakh with a Talysh contingent to recruit nomadic Turcoman tribes to prepare for campaign against Yerevan. Siege started on 15 November 1603. Despite a sturdy defence by Muhammed Sherif Pasha, the Ottoman castle also fell on 8 June 1604. Amir-Guna khan entered the castle from its "White tower" on the east with his Qajar contingent. Afterwards, Amir-Guna Khan was installed as governor of Chokhur-e Sa'd by the Shah according to Iskander beg Munshi, however according to Arakel of Tabriz, he was already appointed as governor during the siege. Consolidating his rule, he moved on to support Husein beg of Ziyadoghlu-Qajar branch to root out Ottomans from Safavid Karabakh.

He was described by Zakaria of Kanaker as "brave and fearless, valiant in battle, undaunted and resolute, a builder and a friend to Christians" and was credited with massive reconstruction efforts. Under his administration, Yerevan's fortifications were strengthened, irrigation channels were dug, and agricultural development was encouraged. However, increased corvée labour caused discontent, as peasants were forced into harsh labour, leading to widespread grievances. He was soon tasked by the Shah to oversaw mass deportations of Armenians from Ararat Valley and neighboring regions under his rule as part of scorched earth policy against Ottomans. His position soon was threatened by Cığalazade Yusuf Sinan Pasha's subordinate Ömer Agha who was appointed by Ottoman governor of the region. The latter quickly captured Nakhchivan in 1605 and prepared to move on to Erivan. However, Amir-Guna soon overpowered and killed him, forcing Ottomans to flee. Amir-Guna led right wing of Safavid army in the battle of Sufiyan on 6 November 1605, blowing a devastating defeat on the Ottomans. After Cığalazade's death in 1606, Amir-Guna increased his pressures on eastern borders of Ottoman Empire, making frequent raids to Van, Mush, Erzurum and Kars, as well as aiding Jelali rebels like Kara Said.

He faced Ottoman army once again in 1609 as Kuyucu Murad Pasha advanced towards Tabriz. Shah recalled Amir-Guna to Tabriz and ordered him to delegate commandership of Erivan castle to someone else. Ottoman army arrived on 22 November 1609, however the sides didn't battle and started peace negotiations which ultimately led to Treaty of Nasuh Pasha. Amir-Guna was tasked with delimitation of the northern borders with Ottomans. Both sides worked on the treaty for 2 months in Salmas and finally signed the treaty on 20 November 1612. However, peace was short-lived.

Soon Ahmed I restarted hostilities against Safavids and sent an army under Öküz Mehmed Pasha towards Iran in 1615. Soon Ottoman army besieged the Erivan castle on 26 August 1616. While Amir-Guna khan his contingent resisted the siege, Shah Abbas started peace negotiations by sending a delegation to make a new ceasefire agreement. However, Shah had no goal of concluding these negotiations and only wanted to prolong them. Finally, Öküz Kara Mehmet Pasha had to abandon the siege because of approaching winter. Ottoman army left for Erzurum on 5 November 1616. Soon Shah gave the monicker "Yellow Lion" (Turkish: Sarı Aslan) for his bravery. According to García de Silva Figueroa, Amir-Guna was in his 80 by this time which would put his birth c. 1536.

== Later years ==
He was visited by German traveler Heinrich von Poser on 12 April 1621. Poser described Iravan as both a beautiful and well-fortified city, arriving during the early days of spring, which, along with Iranian hospitality, left a deep impression on him. During his stay, he was hosted in a lavishly decorated pavilion, adorned with ornate tapestries and fine mirrors, where he was served flower-distilled waters and luxurious sweets. He observed Iranian court customs and Amir-Guna’s sumptuous banquets, where exotic fruits and finely crafted goblets encrusted with emeralds and rubies were displayed. Amir-Gunah Khan personally accompanied Poser and his entourage to Gernichay (modern Azat river), a location near same named river, and bid them farewell with great hospitality.

He led a punitive campaign against Manuchar III Jaqeli in 1623 as a result of his support to rebellious Giorgi Saakadze. Having conquered the Eastern part of Samtskhe-Saatabago, he granted the eastern part of the principality to Salim Khan Shams al-Dinlu. Soon after death of Qarachaqay Khan in Battle of Martkopi on 25 March 1625, the Shah ordered Amir-Guna to join Isa Khan Safavi and Shahbandeh Khan Torkman against Georgian rebels. Amir-Guna was appointed as vanguard commander and faced Georgian army in Battle of Marabda. According to Zakaria of Kanaker, Amir-Guna initially managed to kill a Georgian commander Aga-Tanki, he was soon mortally wounded.

According to Zakaria, he was taken to Yerevan, while his son, Tahmasp bey, remained with Isa Khan. However, using the opportunity, Kurdish chiefs in Ottoman territory raided the Sharur valley. Reportedly incapable Amir-Guna recalled his son to defend territories, who managed to repel the attack. At the same time, he managed to repel an Ottoman attack near Karbi. This story is also corraborated by Munshi. Zakaria later retells a rumor about Tahmasp killing his father: "Some say he strangled him with a rope, others claim he pressed a pillow to his face and sat on him until he suffocated. Yet others argue that Amir-Guna Khan died of his wounds, as doctors failed to heal him—despite applying numerous remedies, his wound worsened until he died in agony." However, he accepts that patricide story is doubtful. According to Arakel however, Tahmasp was still at Shah's court at the time of his death. Munshi reported that he died of his wounds.

== Relation with Armenian Church ==
He played a pivotal role in the power struggle between David IV of Vagharshapat (1587 - 1629) and his former coadjutor bishop Melchizedek I of Garni (1593-1628) according to Arakel of Tabriz. According to him, Amir-Guna manipulated the schism to serve his own interests, secretly favoring Melchizedek despite the shah’s orders. After Shah Abbas deposed Melchizedek and appointed David as Catholicos, he entrusted the latter to Amir-Guna Khan’s protection. However, once the shah left the region, the khan turned against David, disrespecting him and refusing to recognize his authority. In contrast, he maintained secret correspondence with Melchizedek in Isfahan, accepting bribes and gifts to support his return. As a result, David feared for his life and fled to Shah Abbas’ camp, where he successfully convinced the shah to act against Melchizedek. Following David’s accusations, Abbas ordered Melchizedek arrest, and he was captured and brought in chains before the shah. The shah initially intended to execute him, but Amir-Guna Khan personally intervened, persuading the shah to spare his life in exchange for a heavy fine of 300 tumans. This act ensured that Melchizedek could later reclaim power, despite his disgrace.As Melchizedek financial troubles mounted, he attempted to resign and transfer power to Movses III, but when Movses refused, he instead appointed his nephew Sahak as his successor. To secure official recognition, Melchizedek brought Sahak to Amir-Guna Khan, who endorsed his appointment and petitioned the Shah for confirmation. This effectively ensured that Amir-Gunah Khan controlled the leadership of the Armenian Church. Ultimately, while Melchizedek fled to the Ottoman Empire in exile, Amir-Guna Khan retained his position in Yerevan, outlasting both David and Melchizedek.

Another story involving Amir-Guna was the schism of Mekhlu Baba in 1617 (date established by Nerses Akinian). According to stories by Zakaria of Kanaker and Grigor Daranaghtsi he was an ethnic Udi from Ganja. Originally a disciple of Catholicos Hovhannes (1596-1606) at Gandzasar Monastery, he was ordained as an archdeacon but later expelled for spreading heretical teachings. After fleeing the monastery, he sought protection from Davud Khan Undiladze, falsely claiming persecution for preaching the legitimacy of Muhammad. Under suggestion from the khan, the Catholicos was forced to restore his clerical status, enabling Mehlu to amass a following of over 500 supporters, including nobles and clergy. He appointed twelve armed men as his "apostles" and openly opposed monastic institutions, advocating for radical reforms. His movement gained traction among both Christians and Muslims, but his rhetoric and violent actions, including public beatings of monks, led to his eventual arrest by Amir-Guna Khan in Yerevan. Found guilty of deception, he was nearly drowned but later exiled from the region. He continued his activities in Erzurum, where he was ultimately discredited and ostracized by local religious authorities. Following his disappearance, his followers propagated legends claiming divine retribution against his persecutors.

== Family ==
According to Zakaria of Kanaker, Amir-Guna khan had an Armenian wife from Yerevan named Husmi-khan. He had two sons who both governed Chokhur-e Sa'd later: Tahmaspqoli Khan Qajar (1625-1635) and Abbasqoli Khan Qajar (1663-1666).

== Sources ==
- Munshi, Iskandar beg (2010). Tarikh-e Alam-ara-ye Abbasi (in Azerbaijani). Baku: Şərq-Qərb. ISBN 978-9952-34-620-6. OCLC 843766675.
- Bournoutian, George A. (2004). The chronicle of deacon Zakʻaria of Kʻanakʻer. Armenian studies series. Costa Mesa, Calif: Mazda Publishers. ISBN 978-1-56859-121-6.
- Bournoutian, George A. (2010). Book of history: Aṛak'el Dawrizhets'i, Girk' patmut'eants'. Armenian studies series. Costa Mesa, Calif: Mazda Publishers. ISBN 978-1-56859-172-8.
