= Fazli Isfahani Khuzani =

17th-century Iranian nobleman, official and historian

- Born: 1593
- Died: 17th century
- Noble family: Khuzani
- Father: Zayn al-Abidin Beg
- Writing career
- Occupation: Historian
- Language: Persian
- Notable works: Afzal al-Tavarikh

Fazli Isfahani Khuzani (Persian: فضلی اصفهانی خوزانی) was an Iranian nobleman from the Khuzani family, who is known for writing the Afzal al-Tawarikh, a chronicle about the history of the Safavid dynasty from its establishment in 1501 by Ismail I (r. 1501–1524) to the death of Abbas I (r. 1588–1629).

== Background ==
His ancestors, including Shah Mahmud, migrated from Baghdad in the 1440s to establish themselves in the Khuzan district of Isfahan. By 1503, the Khūzāni family had become part of the ruling elite supporting Shah Ismail and the newly established Safavid state. Yar Ahmad Khuzani secured the favour of Ismail, who granted him control over the Khuzan and Khupayya districts of Isfahan and Natanz. In 1509, he was appointed as the vicegerent (vakil).

Fazli's paternal grandfather, Masih al-Din Ruh-Allah Khuzani Isfahani (died 1570), held several important administrative posts, including vazir of Mashhad from 1533 to 1570 and overseer (nāzir) of the shrine of Imam Reza, vazir of Khorasan and Gilan. His father Zain al-Abidin was a middle-level bureaucrat who served minor Safavid princes, one being Mahmud Mirza (died 1577) a son of Tahmasp I. His mother belonged to Khaki Shirazi family. In fact, his maternal uncle Muhammad Salih Khaki Shirazi was succeeded by his paternal uncle Mirza Jan beg Khuzani Isfahani (died 1607).

== Life ==
He was born in 1593. He spent his early years in Azerbaijan, particularly in Ganja, Shaki and Karabakh which he described as Turkistan and regarded as a disadvantage. Despite this, he pursued a career in Safavid administration. In 1617, Shah Abbas appointed him as a provincial vazir in Barda' under Paykar Khan Igirmi Durt. He later held administrative responsibilities in Georgia, Barda', the Safavid falconry, and the crown lands. His role in Georgia included tax collection, governance, and overseeing the reconstruction of Kakheti, which had been devastated by six years of rebellion and Safavid suppression. He was responsible for settling thousands of Turkoman families in Georgia (Igirmi Durt, Ayrums, Dulkadir, Suleyman Hajilu etc.), ensuring agricultural recovery, and managing royal revenues from the region.

During his tenure, he was also involved in military operations. In 1616, he accompanied Safavid troops in an assault on Zagem, a fortified settlement, where his role included managing logistics, counting war casualties, and recording the spoils of war. He noted the enslavement of 700 individuals and the execution of 2,000 prisoners. He was also responsible for ensuring that revenue from silk production and taxation in Karabakh and Kakheti was directed to the Safavid treasury.

However, his career in Georgia ended in 1625 when an uprising led by Giorgi Saakadze, resulted in the massacre of Safavid forces. Paykar Khan, Fazli's patron, fled, and Fazli himself barely escaped, saving several children in the process. Following the loss of Kakheti, he returned to court, awaiting a new appointment. After returning to court, Fazli was appointed vazir of Kerman under Tahmāsp Tarkhān Quli Khān. However, following his patron's death in same year, Fazli's career trajectory is unclear. By 1639–40, he had relocated to the Deccan, Mughal India, where he completed the second volume of Afẓal al-Tavārīkh. The reasons for his emigration remain uncertain, but many Safavid elites sought patronage in Mughal India. His relative, Baqir Khan (descended from Najm-e Sani), had earlier emigrated and risen to prominence under Akbar and Jahāngīr. Fazli's son Najm al-Din Ahmad, married the daughter of Baqir Khan and entered Mughal service. He later authored Tirāz al-Akhbār, a universal history dedicated to Aurangzeb. His later life remains largely undocumented, but his historical works provide insights into Safavid administration, the intellectual climate of his time and especially reign of Shah Abbas.

== Sources ==
- Maeda, Hirotake (2006). "The forced migrations and reorganisation of the regional order in the Caucasus by Safavid Iran: Preconditions and developments described by Fazli Khuzani". In Ieda, Osamu; Uyama, Tomohiko (eds.). Reconstruction and interaction of Slavic Eurasia and its neighbouring worlds (PDF). Slavic Eurasian Studies, No.10. Sapporo: Slavic Research Centre, Hokkaido University. pp. 242, 245–246. ISBN 4938637391.
- Newman, Andrew J. (2008). Safavid Iran: Rebirth of a Persian Empire. I.B.Tauris. pp. 1–281. ISBN 9780857716613.
- Melville, Charles (2006). "AFŻAL AL-TAWĀRIK". In Yarshater, Ehsan (ed.). Encyclopædia Iranica (Online ed.). Encyclopædia Iranica Foundation.
