= Dopalpur =

- Village
- Location in Punjab, India Dopalpur (India)
- Coordinates: 31.0424092°N 76.1998576°E
- Country: India
- State: Punjab
- District: Shaheed Bhagat Singh Nagar

Government
  - Type: Panchayat raj
  - Body: Gram panchayat
- Elevation: 355 m (1,165 ft)

Population (2011)
  - Total: 577
- Sex ratio 280/297 ♂/♀

Languages
  - Official: Punjabi
- Time zone: UTC+5:30 (IST)
- PIN: 144516
- Telephone code: 01823
- ISO 3166 code: IN-PB
- Post office: Langroya
- Website: nawanshahr.nic.in

Dopalpur is a village in Shaheed Bhagat Singh Nagar district of Punjab State, India. It is located 10 kilometres (6.2 mi) away from postal head office Langroya, 17 kilometres (11 mi) from Nawanshahr, 20 kilometres (12 mi) from district headquarter Shaheed Bhagat Singh Nagar and 86 kilometres (53 mi) from state capital Chandigarh. The village is administrated by Sarpanch an elected representative of the village.

== Demography ==
As of 2011, Dopalpur has a total number of 116 houses and population of 577 of which 280 include are males while 297 are females according to the report published by Census India in 2011. The literacy rate of Dopalpur is 77.31%, higher than the state average of 75.84%. The population of children under the age of 6 years is 57 which is 9.88% of total population of Dopalpur, and child sex ratio is approximately 1280 as compared to Punjab state average of 846.

Most of the people are from Schedule Caste which constitutes 37.09% of total population in Dopalpur. The town does not have any Schedule Tribe population so far.

As per the report published by Census India in 2011, 164 people were engaged in work activities out of the total population of Dopalpur which includes 157 males and 7 females. According to census survey report 2011, 83.54% workers describe their work as main work and 16.46% workers are involved in Marginal activity providing livelihood for less than 6 months.

== Education ==
The village has a Punjabi medium, co-ed primary school founded in 1974. The schools does not provide mid-day meal. The school provide free education to children between the ages of 6 and 14 as per Right of Children to Free and Compulsory Education Act. KC Engineering College and Doaba Khalsa Trust Group Of Institutions are the nearest colleges. Industrial Training Institute for women (ITI Nawanshahr) is 14 kilometres (8.7 mi) and Lovely Professional University is 60 kilometres (37 mi) away from the village.

== Transport ==
Nawanshahr railway station is the nearest train station however, Garhshankar Junction railway station is 25 kilometres (16 mi) away from the village. Sahnewal Airport is the nearest domestic airport which located 51 kilometres (32 mi) away in Ludhiana and the nearest international airport is located in Chandigarh also Sri Guru Ram Dass Jee International Airport is the second nearest airport which is 169 kilometres (105 mi) away in Amritsar.

== See also ==
- List of villages in India
