= Ibrahimpur, Ranga Reddy district =

Ibrahimpur
- Village
- Interactive map of Ibrahimpur
- Country: India
- State: Andhra Pradesh
- District: Ranga Reddy
- Metro: Ranga Reddy district

Government
  - Body: Mandal Office

Population (2011)
  - Total: 1,878

Languages
  - Official: Telugu
- Time zone: UTC+5:30 (IST)
- Planning agency: Panchayat
- Civic agency: Mandal Office

Ibrahimpur is a village and panchayat in Ranga Reddy district, Andhra Pradesh, India. It falls under Parigi mandal.
