= Afzal al-Tavarikh =

17th-century chronicle on the history of Safavid Iran

Afzal al-Tavarikh is a 17th-century Persian chronicle on the history of Safavid Iran. It was written by Fazli Isfahani Khuzani (died after 1639), who belonged to an important family with a long history of administrative service under the Safavids. The work was left unfinished, as he was never was content with it.

== Sources ==
- Melville, Charles (2006). "Afżal al-tawāriḵ". Encyclopaedia Iranica.
- Maeda, Hirotake (2015). "New Information on the History of the Caucasus in the Third Volume of Afzal al-tavarikh". In Asatrian, Garnik (ed.). Studies on Iran and The Caucasus: In Honour of Garnik Asatrian. Brill. pp. 107–114. ISBN 978-90-04-30206-8.
