= Ibrahimpur, Azamgarh =

Village in Uttar Pradesh, India

Ibrahimpur
- Village
- Location in Uttar Pradesh, India
- Coordinates: 26°00′37″N 83°10′07″E
- Country: India
- State: Uttar Pradesh
- District: Azamgarh

Population (2001)
  - Total: 6,653

Languages
  - Official: Hindi
- Time zone: UTC+5:30 (IST)

Ibrahimpur is a village in Azamgarh district in the Indian state of Uttar Pradesh.

== Demographics ==
According to 2001 census population of ibrahimpur is 6,653.

Religions in ibrahimpur
Religion	Percent
Hindus	33%
Muslims	66%
Jains	0.5%
Others†	0.5%
Distribution of religions †Includes Sikhs (0.2%), Buddhists (<0.2%).
