= Ibrahimpur, Dharwad =

Ibrahimpur
- village
- Country: India
- State: Karnataka
- District: Dharwad

Population (2011)
  - Total: 3,767

Languages
  - Official: Kannada
- Time zone: UTC+5:30 (IST)

Ibrahimpur is a village in the southern state of Karnataka, India. It is located in the Navalgund taluk of Dharwad district.

== Demographics ==
As of the 2011 Census of India there were 692 households in Ibrahimpur and a total population of 3,767 consisting of 1,935 males and 1,832 females. There were 524 children ages 0-6.
