= North Macedonia under the Ottoman Empire =

Period of Vardar Macedonian history from the mid-14th century to 1912

- 1395–1913
- Map of the Balkans in 1912. Ottoman territories are marked in pink.
- Common languages: Serbian, Macedonian, Turkish, Bulgarian, Greek, Albanian, Aromanian
- Government: Sanjaks within Vilayets of the Ottoman Empire
- Vizier, Sanjak-bey, and Vali
- History
  - Sanjak of Ohrid: 1395
  - Treaty of Bucharest: 1913
Preceded by	Succeeded by
Lordship of Prilep	Kingdom of Serbia
- Today part of: North Macedonia

The territory of modern North Macedonia was part of the Ottoman Empire for over 500 years, from the late 14th century until the Treaty of Bucharest in 1913. Before its conquest, this area was divided between various Serbian feudal principalities. Later, it became part of the Ottoman province or Eyalet of Rumelia. The name Rumelia (Turkish: Rumeli) means "Land of the Romans" in Turkish, referring to the lands in the Balkans conquered by the Ottoman Empire from the Byzantine Empire.

== History ==
=== Conquests ===
In the Battle of Maritsa of 1371, the King of Lordship of Prilep Vukašin Mrnjavčević and his brother Jovan Uglješa led 70,000 men against the Ottomans. Despite having smaller numbers, the Ottomans managed to kill Vukašin and his brother and win the Battle of Maritsa.

After the battle, most of Serbia broke into smaller principalities. One of those principalities is known as the Kingdom of Prilep, led by Vukašin's son Marko. Like most regional rulers in the Macedonian region, Marko accepted vassalage under Sultan Murad I to preserve his position.

The Battle of Kosovo of 1389 sealed the fate of the region of Macedonia for the next 500 years. While both armies lost leaders and large numbers of soldiers, the Ottomans could easily assemble another army just as large while the locals could not.

Marko died alongside Konstantin Dragaš at the Battle of Rovine in 1395 and the territory of his realm became the Sanjak of Ohrid.

All of Vardar Macedonia was under Ottoman control by the early 15th century, with Skopje falling under Turkish rule on January 19, 1392. Aside from conflict with Skanderbeg's forces, in which areas of western part of the region of Macedonia became a battleground of Ottoman–Albanian war for more than 20 years (1444–1467), the Ottoman Empire ultimately succeeded in taking the region, incorporating it into Rumelia Eyalet.

=== Rumelia Eyalet ===
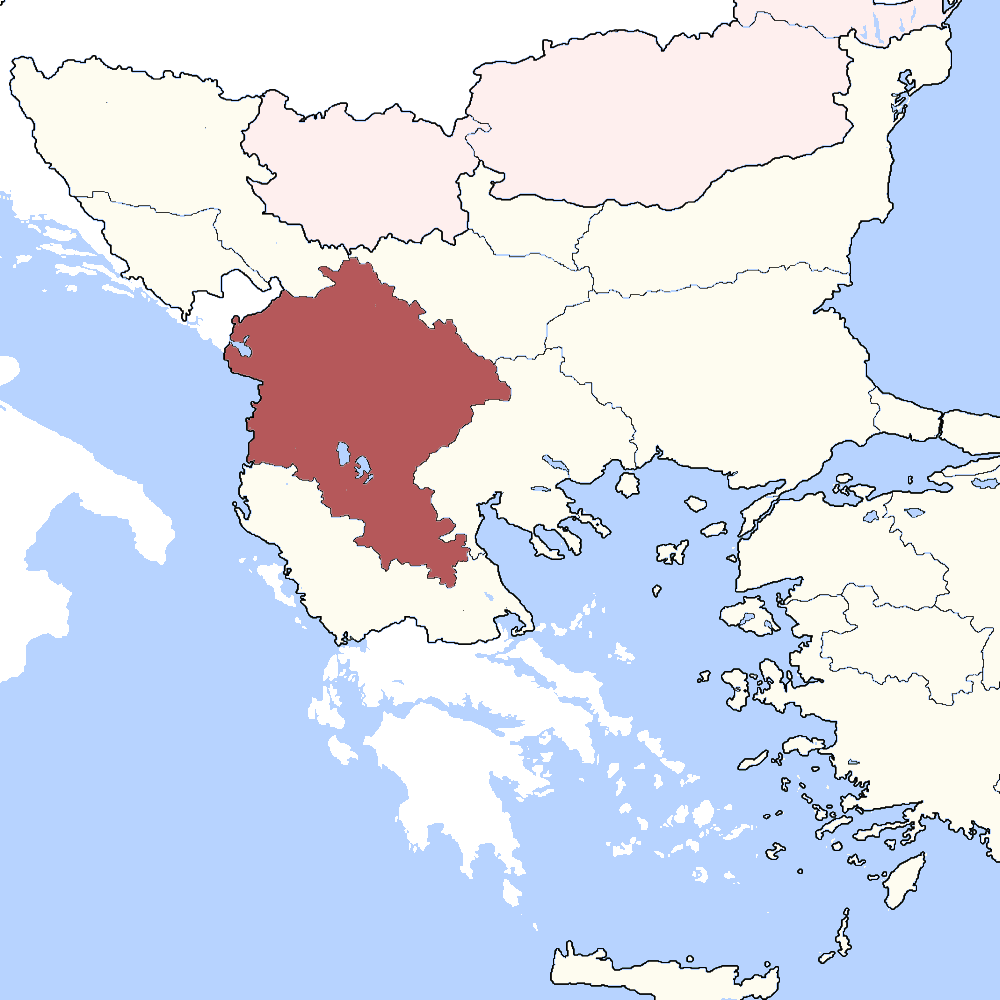
The reduced eyalet in the 1850s

From its foundation, the province of Rumelia encompassed the entirety of the Ottoman Empire's European possessions. The first capital of Rumelia was probably Edirne (Adrianople), which was also, until the Fall of Constantinople in 1453, the Ottomans' capital city. In the 18th century, Monastir (present day Bitola) emerged as an alternate residence of the governor, and in 1836, it officially became the capital of the eyalet. At about the same time, the Tanzimat reforms, aimed at modernizing the Empire, split off the new eyalets of Üsküb, Yanya and Selanik and reduced the Rumelia Eyalet to a few provinces around Monastir. The rump eyalet survived until 1867, when, as part of the transition to the more uniform vilayet system, it became part of the Salonica Vilayet.

The reduced Rumelia Eyalet, centred at Manastir, encompassed also the sanjaks of Iskenderiyye (Scutari), Ohri (Ohrid) and Kesrye (Kastoria). In 1855, according to the French traveller A. Viquesnel, it comprised the sanjaks of Iskenderiyye, with 7 kazas or sub-provinces, Ohri with 8 kazas, Kesrye with 8 kazas and the pasha-sanjak of Manastir with 11 kazas.

=== Vilayets ===
After administrative reform in 1860s, the Ottoman Empire was divided into vilayets which were subdivided into sanjaks.

==== Kosovo Vilayet ====
The northern part of the Macedonian region was included in the Kosovo Vilayet. Sanjaks located in this vilayet that contained territory now within the Republic of North Macedonia were:

- Sanjak of Üsküp, which included the kazas of Üsküp (Skopje), Kumanova (Kumanovo), İştip (Štip), Karatova (Kratovo), Planka (Kriva Palanka), Radovişte (Radoviš) and Koçana (Kočani).
- Sanjak of Prizren, which included the kaza of Kalkandelen (Tetovo).

==== Monastir Vilayet ====
The southwestern part of the region was located in the Monastir vilayet. Sanjaks located in this vilayet that contained territory now within the Republic of North Macedonia were:

- Sanjak of Monastir, which included the kazas of Monastir (Bitola), Ohri (Ohrid) and Pirlepe (Prilep)
- Sanjak of Dibra, which included the kazas of Debar and Kırçova (Kičevo)

==== Salonika Vilayet ====
The southeastern part of the region was located in the Salonika vilayet. Sanjaks located in this vilayet that contained territory now within the Republic of North Macedonia were:

- Sanjak of Selanik, which included the following kazas: Tikveş (Kavadarci), Usturumca (Strumica), Köprülü (Veles)), Toyran (Dojran) and Gevgili (Gevgelija)

===== 1881/82 Ottoman census =====
Ottoman censuses did not count ethnic groups, but rather millets, and increasingly from the 1870s onwards, ethnoconfessional groups. Thus, "Muslims" in the 1881/82 census covered all adherents of Islam, regardless if they were ethnic Turks, Slavs, Albanians, Romani, etc. "Greeks" referred to all Greeks and to any Vlachs, Albanians and Slavs, who considered themselves to be Greek (or Serbian). "Bulgarians" comprised only those (Christian) Slavs who considered themselves Bulgarians.

Thus, according to the Ottoman census of 1881/82, the population of the kazas currently falling within the borders of the Republic of North Macedonia is divided into the following ethnoconfessional groups:

Ethnoconfessional groups in kazas currently part of the Republic of North Macedonia as per the 1881-82 Ottoman census
Kaza^{1}	Bulgarians		Muslims		Greeks		Miscellaneous^{2}		Kaza total	
Kaza^{1}	Number	%	Number	%	Number	%	Number	%	Number	%
Köprülü	32,843	64.0	18,093	35.2	420	0.8	0	-	51,356	100%
Tikveş	21,319	51.3	19,909	47.8	260	0.6	32	0.1	41,520	100
Gevgili	5,784	14.9	17,063	44.0	14,558	37.5	1,402	3.6	38,807	100
Doyran	5,605	20.6	19,423	58.2	1,591	5.9	551	2.0	27,170	100
Usturumca	2,974	9.0	15,760	47.7	13,726	41.6	564	1.7	33,024	100
Selanik Vilayet Subtotal	68,525	35.7	90,248	47.0	30,555	15.9	2,549	1.3	191,877	100
Üsküp	22,497	32.1	40,256	57.3	6,655	9.5	762	1.1	70,170	100
Karatova	19,618	81.8	4,332	18.1	33	0.1	0	-	23,985	100
Kumanova	29,478	70.5	12,268	29.3	87	0.2	8	0.0	41,841	100
Planka	18,196	88.1	2,078	10.1	388	1.8	0	-	20,662	100
İştip	17,575	41.6	24,166	57.2	0	-	515	1.2	42,251	100
Kaçana	33,120	59.7	22,239	40.1	83	0.2	0	-	55,442	100
Radovişte	7,364	41.0	10,519	58.5	0	-	97	0.5	17,980	100
Kalkandelen	9,830	22.4	29,212	66.3	4,990	11.3	0	-	44,032	100
Kosova Vilayet Subtotal	157,678	49.8	145,070	45.9	12,236	3.9	1,382	0.4	316,363	100
Manastır	61,494	44.7	30,517	22.2	41,077	29.9	4,365	3.2	137,453	100
Ohri	33,306	63.2	16,360	31.0	3,049	5.8	0	-	52,685	100
Pirlepe	43,763	73.8	14,270	24.0	1,248	2.1	42	0.1	59,327	100
Kırçova	20,879	60.1	13,282	38.8	64	0.2	4	0.0	34,229	100
Manastır Vilayet Subtotal	159,442	56.2	74,429	26.2	45,438	16.0	4,411	1.6	283,694	100
NORTH MACEDONIA borders	385,645	48.7	309,747	39.1	88,229	11.1	8,342	1.1	791,963	100
^{1} The kaza of Dibra did not participate in the census.^{2} The "Miscellaneous" category includes, among other things, Jews—numbering 4,274 in Monastir, 724 in Üsküp, 573 in Usturumca, 515 in İştip, 167 in Toyran, etc.; Greek Catholic (Uniate) Bulgarians—numbering 1,402 in Gevgili, 376 in Toyran. etc.; Protestants—numbering 97 in Radovişte, and so on.

=== Balkan Wars ===
The Balkan Wars consisted of two wars that occurred in 1912 and 1913. The first began on 8 October 1912 when the nations of the Balkan League, who had large parts of their ethnic populations under Ottoman rule, attacked the Ottoman Empire. It lasted seven months with the Balkan League nations coming up victorious, ending 500 years of Ottoman rule in the Balkans.

== Vardar Macedonian cities under Ottoman rule ==
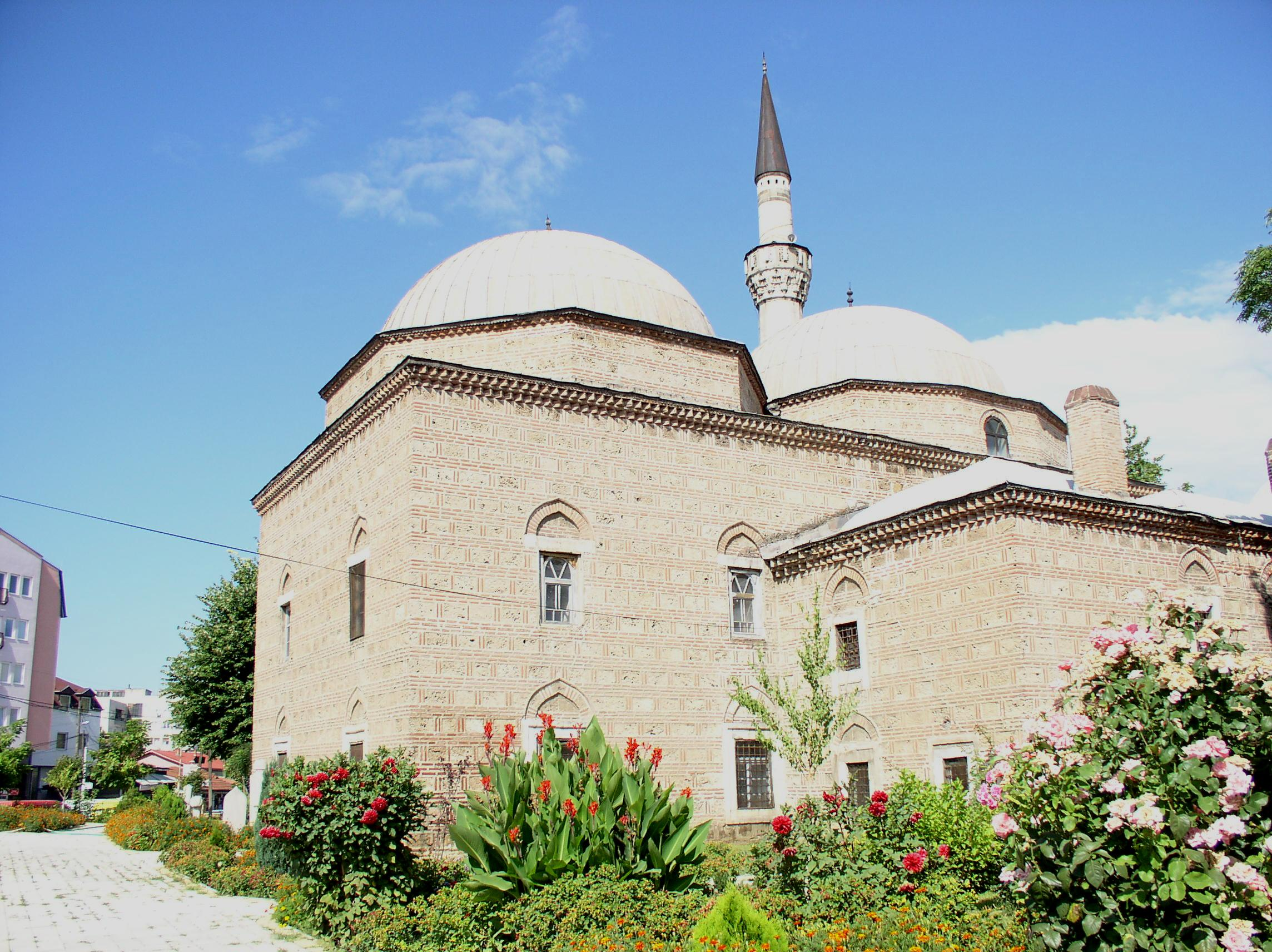
After falling under Ottoman rule, many mosques and other Islamic buildings, such as the Isa Bey Mosque, were built in the cities like Skopje

During the Ottoman rule of the Balkans, cities experienced many changes with regards to the demographic makeup of their population and the look of their cityscapes. With laws that prohibited Christian buildings from being higher than Islamic ones, the skylines of cities like Üsküp (Skopje) and Manastır (Bitola) were dominated by minarets.

Ottoman traveller Evliya Çelebi visited the city of Manastır in 1661. He wrote that of the seven mosques in the city at the time, six were built in the 16th century. Most of the mosques constructed on the territory of today's Republic of North Macedonia were square in shape with a three-domed portico and a minaret on the building's right side.

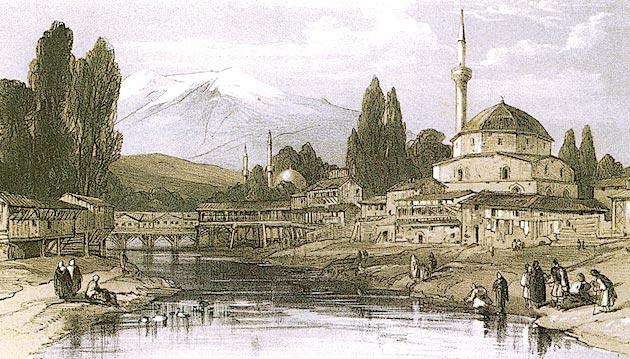
Ottoman Manastır (Bitola) in the 1800s

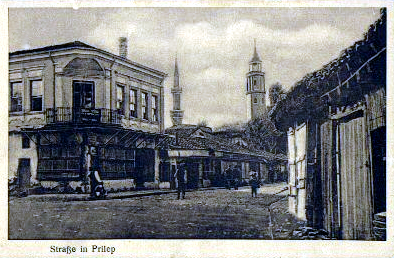
Pirlepe (Prilep) at the end of the 19th century

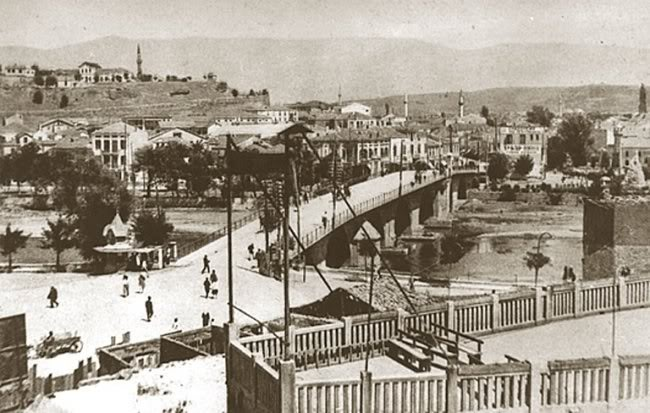
Minarets in the Ottoman Üsküp (Skopje) skyline

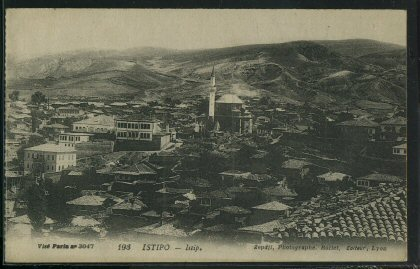
Ottoman İştip (Štip)

== See also ==
- History of North Macedonia
- History of the Balkans
- Old Bazaar, Skopje
- Ottoman era in the history of Bulgaria
