= Sanjak of Siroz =

Administrative division of the Ottoman Empire

Sanjak of Siroz Ottoman Turkish: Liva-i Siroz
- Sanjak of the Ottoman Empire
- before 1846–1912
- Capital: Serres (Siroz)
- History
  - Established: ca. 1846
  - First Balkan War: 1912
Succeeded by
Kingdom of Bulgaria
- Today part of: Bulgaria; Greece

The Sanjak of Siroz or Serres (Ottoman Turkish: Sancak-i/Liva-i Siroz; Greek: λιβάς/σαντζάκι Σερρών, Bulgarian: Серски Санджак) was a second-level Ottoman province (sanjak or liva) encompassing the region around the town of Serres (Turkish: Siroz, now in Greece) in central Macedonia.

== History ==
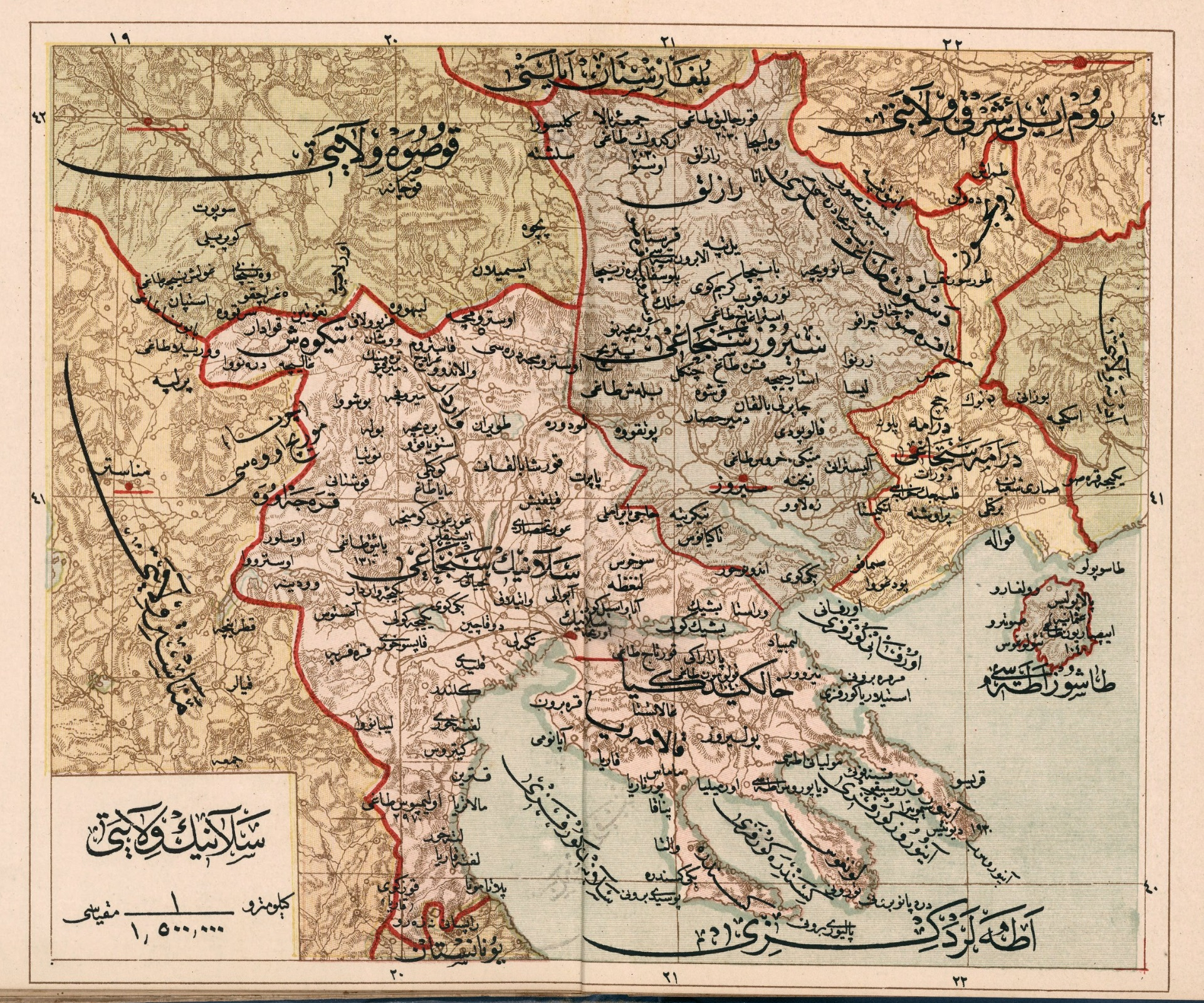
1907 Ottoman map of the Salonica Vilayet, with the sanjaks of Salonica, Siroz and Drama

Serres fell to the Ottoman Empire on 19 September 1383, and initially formed a fief of Evrenos Beg, who brought in Yörük settlers from Sarukhan. Although never rising to particular prominence within the Ottoman Empire, Serres became also the site of a mint from 1413/14 on. In the 18th and early 19th centuries, Serres was an autonomous beylik under a succession of derebeys, within the Sanjak of Salonica.

Siroz became a regular province by 1846, during the Tanzimat reforms, as a sanjak of the Salonica Eyalet (later Salonica Vilayet), encompassing the towns of Drama, Melnik, Timurhisar (Sidirokastro), Nevrekop (Gotse Delchev) and Lissa. Drama was created as a separate sanjak centre shortly after, and by 1912, the last year of its existence, the sanjak of Serres encompassed the kazas of Serres proper, Zihne (Nea Zichni), Melnik, Razlik (Razlog), Petrich, Timurhisar (Sidirokastro), Djuma-i Bala (Blagoevgrad) and Nevrekop (Gotse Delchev).

Ethnoconfessional Groups in the Sanjak of Siroz as per the 1881-82 Ottoman Census
1. Muslims (42.3%)
2. Bulgarians (36.3%)
3. Greeks (20.7%)
4. Jews (0.30%)
5. Miscellaneous (0.20%)

The province was dissolved when occupied by Bulgarian troops in the First Balkan War. In 1913, after the Second Balkan War, the town of Serres and the southern half of the sanjak became part of Greece.

== Demographics ==
According to the 1881–1882 and the 1905–1906 census of the Ottoman Empire, the population of the Sanjak of Siroz is distributed, as follows:

Ethnoconfessional Groups in the Sanjak of Siroz as per the 1905-1906 Ottoman Census
1. Muslims (41.3%)
2. Bulgarians (39.3%)
3. Greeks (19.4%)
4. Jews (0.40%)

Ethnoconfessional group
Ethnoconfessional group	1881-82 Census	%	1905-06 Census (Karpat)	%	1905-06 Census (Archives)	%
Muslims	143,860	42.3	68,168	42.3	150,045	41.3
Orthodox Bulgarians	123,437	36.3	69,034	36.2	131,476	39.3
Orthodox Greeks	70,459	20.7	46,018	24.1	82,334	19.4
Jews	1,112	0.3	1,420	0.7	1,580	0.4
Gypsies	N/A	N/A	2,029	1.1	N/A	N/A
Foreign citizens	725	0.2	4	0.0	N/A	N/A
Protestants	283	0.0	29	0.0	N/A	N/A
Armenians	5	0.0	31	0.0	N/A	N/A
Total	339,881	100.0	190,656*	100.0	365,435	100.0
^{*}Suspiciously low figures for all ethnoconfessional groups given that there have been no border changes or mass migration from the sanjak
