= Greece–Iraq relations =

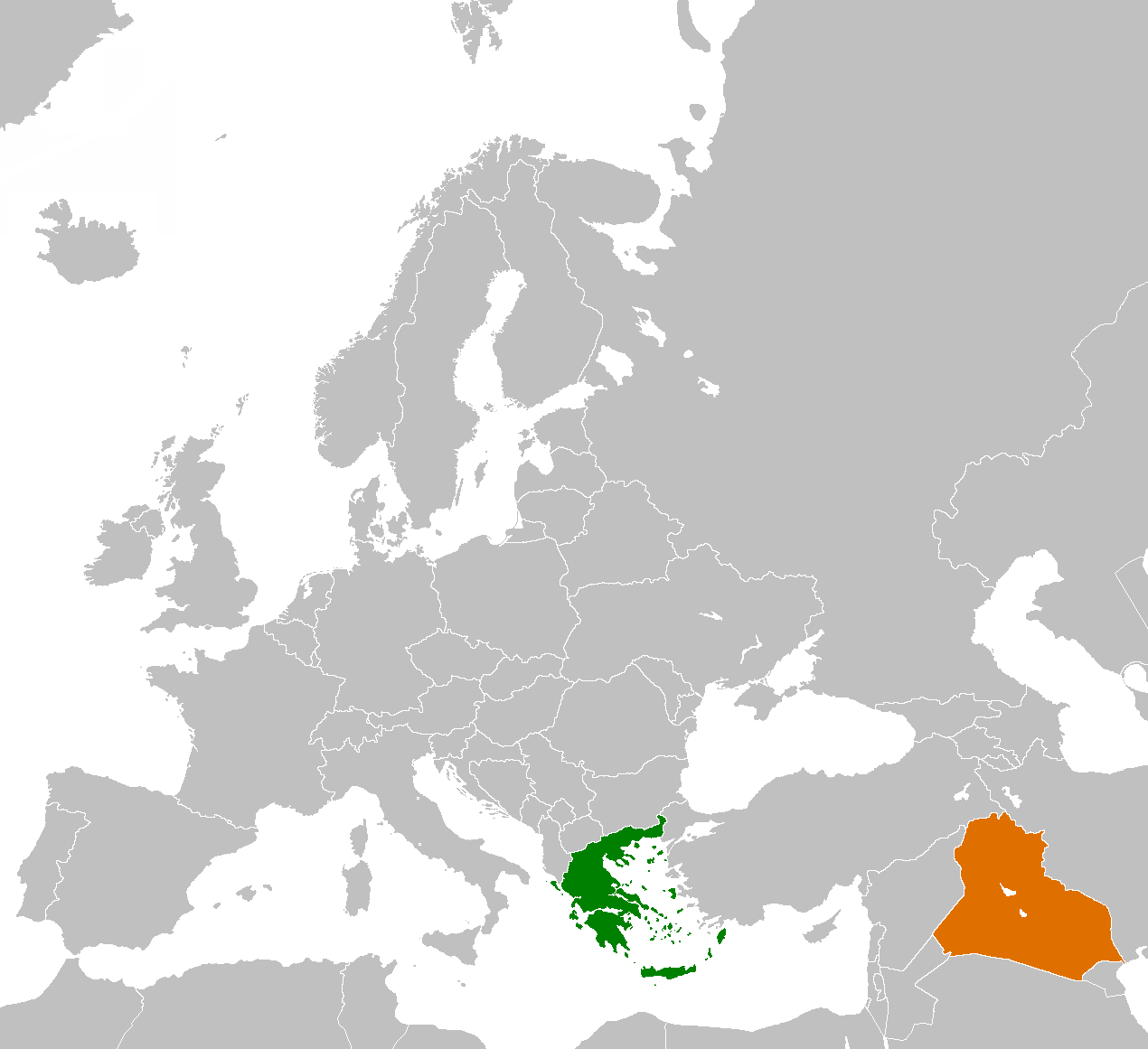
- Greece: Iraq

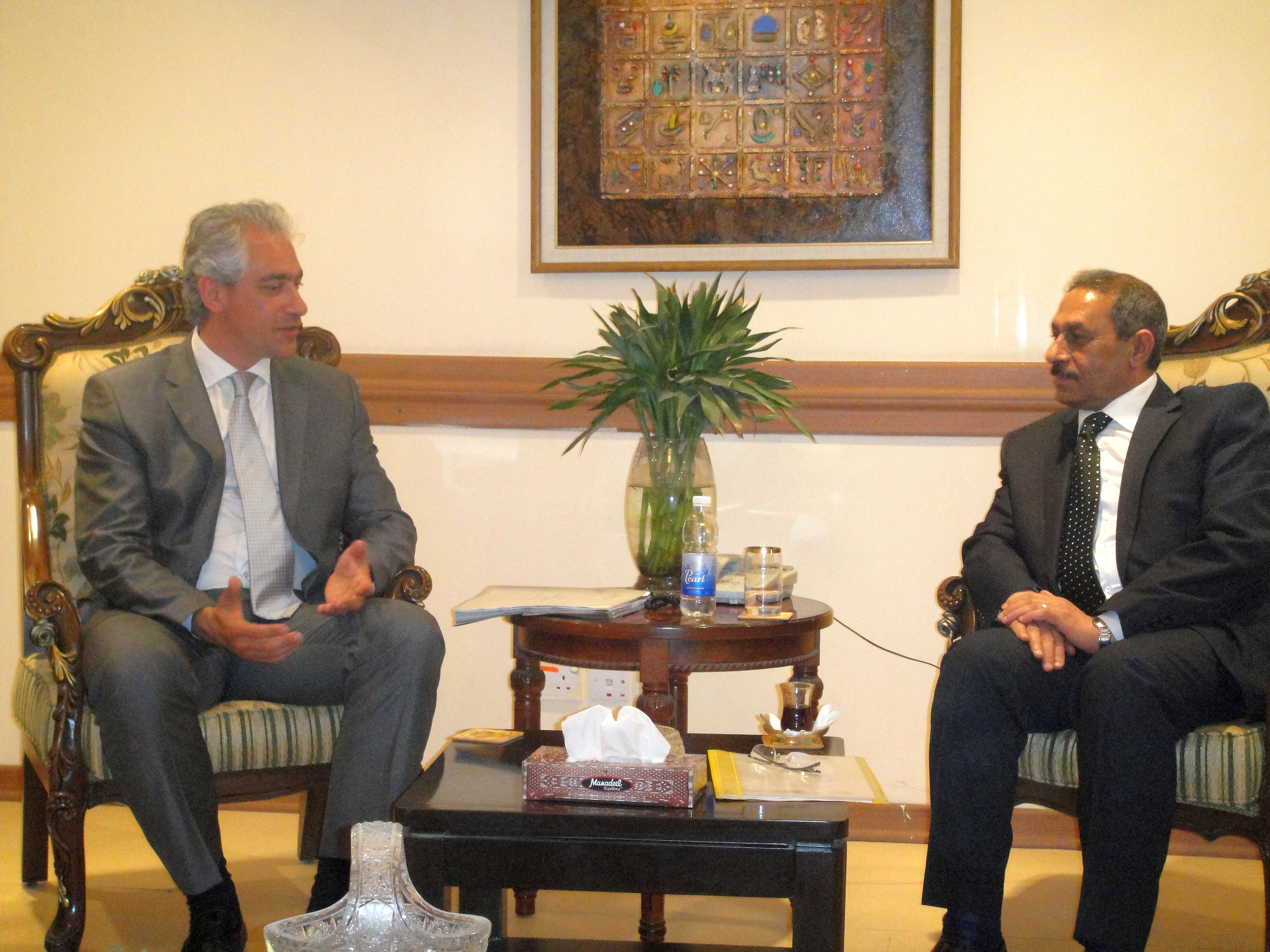
On Monday, 6 June, Deputy Foreign Minister Spyros Kouvelis travelled to Baghdad for bilateral meetings with members of the Iraqi government. Meeting with Iraqi Deputy Agriculture Minister, Mehdi Al Qaisi.

Greece–Iraq relations are foreign relations between Greece and Iraq. Relations of the Greek and Iraqi peoples are deeply rooted in history, both have developed cultures that have influenced the course of humanity. They date as far back as when early Greek scholars of the 1st millennium BC lived and studied in Babylonia and Assyria, to later when Alexander III of Macedon ruled Mesopotamia (which name is of Greek origin, meaning "the land between two rivers") and would die in Babylon, Iraq. Greece helped invade Iraq during the Gulf War. In the Iraq War, however, Greece refused to send troops to participate in the American destruction of the Iraqi government, with Greeks overwhelmingly opposed to the invasion. Greece traditionally maintained good and friendly relations with Iraq due to strong historical and cultural bonds, dating back to ancient times.

Greece has an embassy in Baghdad, and Iraq is represented by her embassy in Athens. Both nations border Turkey.

== History ==
=== Modern history ===
Since 1979, when Saddam Hussein came to power Greek-Iraqi political relations have been good but limited due to Iraq's totalitarian regime. Official agreements signed by Greece and Iraq demonstrate the spirit of solidarity and co-operation by which relations of both countries are marked. For instance, in 1979 Constantinos Karamanlis, who was then Prime Minister of Greece, visited Baghdad; during that visit both sides signed a co-operation agreement on technical and economic issues.

Moreover, during the Iran–Iraq War there was co-operation in the field of war material. As, in 1985 the Greek company PYRKAL provided Iraq with $77 million worth of munitions and in 1987 the Greek company EBO provided approximately $83 million worth of munitions. After Gulf War I, UN sanctions were imposed on Iraq. Greece supported the oil for food programme as it was interested in the future of the Iraqi people. As a result of its economic embargo Iraq owes high amounts to Greek companies on the basis of their co-operation during the Iran–Iraq War. Despite Iraq's international isolation both countries continued their co-operation. Specifically, in 1998 Greece and Iraq signed a scientific and cultural co-operation agreement which included co-operation between Iraqi and Greek universities regarding degree recognition, the granting of scholarships and the teaching of ancient and Modern Greek in Iraq. In addition, in June 1999 the President of the Foreign Affairs Committee of the Iraqi Parliament visited Athens, as did the General Director of the Iraqi News Agency, who signed a co-operation agreement with the Athens News Agency. Furthermore, in June 2000, the eighth Meeting of the Mixed Economic Committee of the two countries took place, and upon its conclusion a Text of the Agreed Minutes was signed. To conclude, Iraq and Greece have almost always enjoyed a friendly relationship.

== Greece's position in the 2003 invasion of Iraq ==
Greek Prime Minister Costas Simitis's declaration on 21 March 2003 mirrored the official Greek position regarding the invasion, as he declares

"Greece is not participating in the war and will not get entangled in it."

In addition, Greek Foreign Minister George Papandreou expressed Greece's opposition to the United States going it alone in Iraq. Many other political parties condemned the invasion, such as the Communist Party (KKE) and the Greek Left Party-Synaspismos, who saw the war as proof of U.S. imperialistic aspirations in the Middle East.

Despite opposing the war, Greece did agree with the United States policy of disarming Iraq and destructing any WMD that Iraq supposedly possessed. However, Greece did not agree with Bush's strategy of preemptive war as a means of fighting terrorism. By contrast it was in favor of settling the dispute over Iraq by diplomatic means and not by force.

Unlike the opposition to Gulf War II, Greece did participate in the first Gulf War, as a means of restoring peace in the Persian Gulf, after Iraq had invaded Kuwait.

=== Domestic response ===
Public opinion in Greece was overwhelmingly against the war on Iraq. A poll published on 4 April 2003 showed that 90.7% of Greeks were totally opposed to the intervention in Iraq, while 3.4% were quite opposed to it. Only 1.4% agreed completely with the war and 2.0% agreed to an extent.

Many demonstrations took place with people shouting anti-American slogans and marching to the U.S. Embassy in Athens and the U.S. consulate in Thessaloniki. For example, on 14 February 2003 approximately 100,000 people participated in the anti-war demonstration in Athens. In addition, nationwide strikes were called by the two general trade union federations in Greece, namely the GSEE (private sector) and ADEDI (public sector) to protest the war against Iraq. These strikes shut down public services, private companies, schools, universities, shops etc.; in order to give people the chance to express their opposition to the U.S.-led war against Iraq.

=== Greek media ===
The Greek media strongly criticized the U.S. and its foreign policy motivations and also condemned U.S. policy towards Iraq. The media saw the oil factor as the reason for war, to reflect the influence of media onto the peoples, a poll organised by Alco showed that 91.5% in 94.5% of Greek young people who watched television, read newspapers and listened to radio during the war believe that the U.S. invaded Iraq for economic reasons while only 2.7% to fight terrorism. According to the same poll 93.2% of young Greek people had a negative image of George W. Bush.

== Agreements ==
Major Greek–Iraqi interstate agreements include:

- Agreement on consular passport fees
- Greek–UK Agreement on mutual recognition of merchant ship survey certificates.
- Commercial air transport Agreement.
- Trade Agreement.
- Agreement on educational and scientific cooperation.
- Agreement on international road transport.
- Agreement on economic and technical cooperation.
- Tourism cooperation agreement between the Greek National Tourism Organisation (GNTO) and Iraqs State Tourism Organisation.
- Agreement on the training of Iraqis at the Hellenic Air Force Academy.
- Protocol of cooperation on agricultural issues.
- Tourism Cooperation Agreement.

Since 1978, eight Greek-Iraqi Joint Ministerial Committee meetings have been held.

== Resident diplomatic missions ==
- Greece has an embassy in Baghdad.
- Iraq has an embassy in Athens.

== See also ==
- Foreign relations of Greece
- Foreign relations of Iraq
- Iraqis in Greece
- Iraq and the European Union
