= Sanjak of Monastir =

Ottoman Empire division in Macedonia

Sanjak of Monastir, late 19th century.

The Sanjak of Monastir or Manastir (Turkish: Manastir Sancağı) or Bitola, was a sanjak within the Rumelia Eyalet (1465–1867) and then the Manastir Vilayet (1874–1912). The administrative seat was in Manastir (Bitola).

== Sub-districts ==
=== 1880 ===
The sub-districts, kaza, of the Sanjak of Manastir included (in 1880):

- Bitola
- Florina
- Kičevo
- Prilep
- Ohrid

And the mudurluk of:

- Prespa
- Resen
- Ekşisu
- Mariovo

=== –1908 ===
The sub-districts, kaza, of the Sanjak of Manastir included (before 1908):

- Monastir (Bitola)
- Pirlepe (Prilep)
- Florina
- Kıraçova (Kičevo)
- Ohrid

== Demographics ==
=== 1897 ===
Ethnoconfessional Groups in the Sanjak of Monastir as per the 1881-82 Census
1. Bulgar millet (49.8%)
2. Muslims (26.7%)
3. Rum millet (22.2%)
4. Jews (1.30%)

According to Russian consul in the Manastir Vilayet, A. Rostkovski, finishing the statistical article in 1897, the total population of the sanjak was 308,996, with Rostkovski grouping the population into the following groups:

- Bulgarian Exarchists: 151,863
- Greek Patriarchists: 51,749
- Pomaks: 8,251
- Albanian Muslims: 45,259
- Albanian Christians: 723
- Vlachs (Aromanians and Megleno-Romanians): 22,681
- Turks, Ottomans: 24,923
- Jews: 4,270

=== Ottoman censuses ===
Ethnoconfessional Groups in the Sanjak of Monastir as per the 1905-1906 Census
1. Bulgar millet (47.9%)
2. Muslims (26.6%)
3. Rum millet (23.9%)
4. Jews (1.30%)
5. Miscellaneous (0.20%)

According to the 1881–1882 and the 1905–1906 census of the Ottoman Empire, the population of the Sanjak of Manastir is distributed, as follows:

Ethnoconfessional group
Ethnoconfessional group	Ottoman Census of 1881–1882	%	Ottoman Census of 1905–1906	%
Orthodox Bulgarians	162,796	49.8	171,618	47.9
Muslims	87,292	26.7	95,191	26.6
Orthodox Greeks	72,600	22.2	85,729	23.9
Jews	4,274	1.3	4,559	1.3
Wallachians	N/A	N/A	652	0.1
Gypsies	N/A	N/A	535	0.1
Protestants	38	0.0	-	0.0
Armenians	26	0.0	2	0.0
Foreign citizens	47	0.0	31	0.0
Total	327,073	100.0	358,317	100.0
