= Sanjak of Drama =

Former Ottoman province

Sanjak of Drama Ottoman Turkish: Liva-i Drama
- Sanjak of the Ottoman Empire
- ca. 1846–1867; 1869–1872; 1873–1912
- Sanjak of Drama highlighted within the Selanik vilayet
- Capital: Drama
- History
  - Established: ca. 1846
  - First Balkan War: 1912
Succeeded by
Kingdom of Bulgaria
- Today part of: Greece

The Sanjak of Drama (Ottoman Turkish: Sancak-i/Liva-i Drama; Greek: λιβάς/σαντζάκι Δράμας) was a second-level Ottoman province (sanjak or liva) encompassing the region around the town of Drama (now in Greece) in eastern Macedonia.

The sanjak was formed as part of the Tanzimat reforms ca. 1846, from territory taken from various provinces; Drama itself belonged to the Sanjak of Siroz. The sanjak belonged to the Salonica Eyalet, after 1867 the Salonica Vilayet. In 1867–69, the Sanjak of Drama was merged back into the Sanjak of Siroz, was re-established and then temporarily abolished in 1872–73. In 1891, its territories east of the Nestos river became part of the Sanjak of Adrianople.

In 1912, the sanjak comprised six sub-provinces (kazas): Drama, Kavala, Sarışaban (Chrysoupoli), the island of Taşuz (Thasos) and Pravişte (Eleftheroupolis). The province was dissolved when occupied by Bulgarian troops in the First Balkan War, and in 1913, after the Second Balkan War, it became part of Greece

== Sources ==
- Birken, Andreas [in German] (1976). Die Provinzen des Osmanischen Reiches [The Provinces of the Ottoman Empire]. Beihefte zum Tübinger Atlas des Vorderen Orients, 13 (in German). Reichert. p. 76. ISBN 3-920153-56-1.
