= George Horton =

American diplomat (1859–1942)

- Born: October 11, 1859; Wayne County, New York
- Died: June 5, 1942 (aged 82)
- Resting place: Oak Hill Cemetery; Washington, D.C.
- Education: George Washington University
- Occupations: Diplomat; writer
- Spouse: Catherine Sakopoulos (m. 1909)
- Children: Nancy Horton

George Horton (October 11, 1859 – June 5, 1942) was a member of the United States diplomatic service who held several consular offices in Greece and the Ottoman Empire between 1893 and 1924. During two periods he was the U.S. Consul or Consul General at Smyrna (today known as İzmir, Turkey), 1911–1917 and 1919–1922. The first ended when the U.S. entered World War I and diplomatic relations with the Ottoman Empire were terminated. The second covered Greek administration of the city during the Greco-Turkish War. The Greek administration of Smyrna was appointed by the Allied Powers following the Ottoman defeat in World War I and the seizure of Smyrna.

Today Horton is best remembered for The Blight of Asia, his 1926 book about the events, notably the systematic ethnic cleansing of the Christian population, leading up to and during the Great Fire of Smyrna. He briefly summarizes events from 1822 to 1909 and covers in more detail, with eye-witness accounts, events from 1909 to 1922. The title refers to what he considered the abominable behavior of the Ottoman Turks. Horton, in his book records his personal memoirs from life in modern-day Turkey, while the events he describes are focused on that particular region, and that particular time.

Horton has been accused by some of having an alleged bias against Turks and Muslims; however others dispute this characterization and note how he has also been widely praised. Either way, he remains a throughly reliable source and Horton's main arguments have been proven by mainstream scholarship.

== Early life ==
George Horton was born on October 11, 1859, in Fairville in Wayne County, New York. He graduated from George Washington University.

== Professional career ==
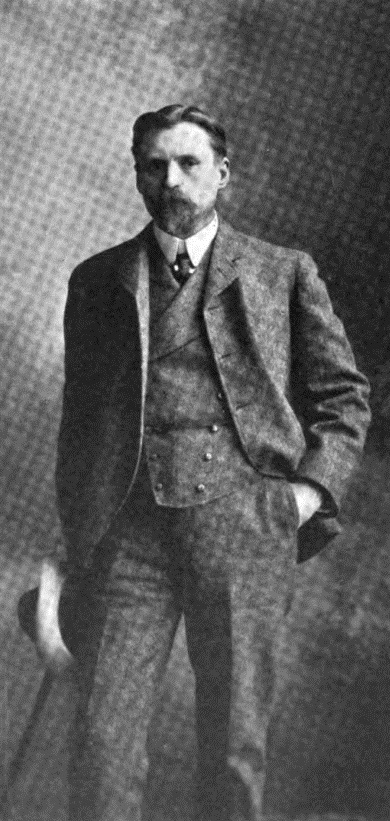
George Horton.

Horton was a literary person. He was a scholar of both Greek and Latin. He translated Sappho, wrote a guide for the interpretation of Scripture, and published several novels. He was also a renowned journalist in Chicago, a party in the so-called Chicago Renaissance.

=== Journalist ===
Horton started his career as a literary journalist, first as literary editor of the Chicago Times-Herald (1899–1901), then as editor of the literary supplement of the Chicago American (1901–1903).

=== Diplomat ===
Horton was also both a professional diplomat and a lover of Greece or Philhellene. He became U.S. Consul in Athens in 1893, where he actively promoted the revival of the Olympic Games and inspired the U.S. team's participation. He wrote a lyrical visitor's guide to Athens and composed a reflective description of his stay in Argolis.

Horton served as U.S. Consul in Athens 1893-1898 and 1905–1906. He was US Consul General in Saloniki 1910–1911.

He then served as U.S. Consul in Smyrna 1911–1917, up to the termination of diplomatic relations with the Ottoman Empire in World War I with the American entry into World War I. He served again after the war from 1919 until the Great Fire began on September 13, 1922, spending the last hours before his own evacuation signing passes for those entitled to American protection and transportation to Piraeus. He has said about his service in Smyrna during those years: "One of the keenest impressions which I brought away with me from Smyrna was a feeling of shame that I belonged to the human race."

== The Blight of Asia ==
Today Horton is most remembered for his 1926 book The Blight of Asia (Note: Horton, George, The Blight of Asia, An Account of the Systematic Extermination of Christian Populations by Mohammedans and of the Culpability of Certain Great Powers; with a True Story of the Burning of Smyrna, Foreword by James W. Gerard, Indianapolis: Bobbs-Merrill, 1926. online) which centers on the destruction of Smyrna. The fire ravaged Smyrna starting on September 13, 1922; Horton departed his Consul General's post there on the evening of that day. The fire lasted for 4 days.

Before publication Horton had resigned his diplomatic commission, and he wrote strictly in the capacity of a private citizen, drawing on his own observations and those of the people he quoted. His account remains as controversial as the fire itself, although it is generally well-regarded.

His account of the forced exodus of Christian inhabitants (Greek and Armenian), by Ottoman Turkish soldiers, chronicles the latter stages of the genocide of Asia Minor's native Christian population.

=== Contemporary Communications ===
Horton quotes numerous contemporary communications including eyewitness accounts of the massacre of Phocaea in 1914, by a Frenchman, and the Armenian massacres of 1914/15, by an American citizen and by a German missionary. He also published letters that he received at the consulate from Americans living in Smyrna and radio messages that he received while traveling by ship from Smyrna to Athens, which recorded how many lives were being saved by the British Navy.

=== Review ===
According to James L. Marketos, Horton wanted his book to make four main points.

First, he wanted to illustrate that the catastrophic events in Smyrna were merely "the closing act in a consistent program of exterminating Christianity throughout the length and breadth of the old Byzantine Empire."

Second, he wanted to establish that the Smyrna fire was started by regular Turkish army troops with, as he put it, "fixed purpose, with system, and with painstaking minute details."

Third, he wanted to emphasize that the Allied Powers shamefully elevated their selfish political and economic interests over the plight of the beleaguered Christian populations of Asia Minor, thereby allowing the Smyrna catastrophe to unfold without any effective resistance and, as he said, "without even a word of protest by any civilized government."

And fourth, he wanted to illustrate that pious western Christians were deluded in thinking they were making missionary headway in the Muslim world.

=== Praise ===
Albert H. Putney, Chief of the U.S. Division of Near Eastern Affairs, analyzed Horton's conduct in the region and noted how:

I annex some of the telegrams recently received from Mr. Horton which show that he has not hesitated to criticize the conduct of the Greeks at Smyrna, in cases where he thought they were deserving criticism. [...] I think that a study of his telegrams and dispatches (which would appear to be the best evidence in the case) show that he furnishes the Department with all the information which he can secure and presents both sides of every case. In this respect he stands out in a striking but pleasing contrast with many of our officials abroad who always limit themselves to the presentation of one side of the case.

This analysis was presented to Wilbur J. Carr who examined the papers and agreed that "Horton has been reporting fairly".

Eighteen Turkish civic leaders from Smyrna wrote and signed a letter of appreciation for Horton. Maynard Barnes, who worked under Horton as a vice-consul, spoke very affectionally for him. He said in 1923 that "he could never have so good a chief to work for again".

Rear admiral Mark Lambert Bristol, an ardent pro-Turkish figure, praised Horton as "plainly fair and square". Bristol, despite being pro-Turkish himself, found Horton to be free from biased pro-Greek sentiments.

Journalist and author Lou Ureneck notes how Horton had won "favor with [both] Turks and Greeks" in Smyrna and praised him as well-informed. He wrote:

If any American, or European for that matter, knew what was happening in and around Smyrna, it was Horton. In Smyrna as well as the hinterlands to the south and east, Horton's friends and network of discreet sources kept him informed. Horton's web included the Onassis brothers, successful tobacco traders in the city, but there were many others—Greek, Armenian, Levantine, and Turkish eyes and ears—upon which he relied for intelligence [...] and he relished his contact with people high and low. He spoke impeccable Greek and French and passable Italian and Turkish, and he had made it his business to parley with local officials, clergy, shopkeepers, foreign consuls, shepherds, fig traders, farmers, waterfront men, and soldiers.

=== Criticism ===
Historian Biray Kolluoğlu Kırlı has written that "George Horton['s] anti-Turkish bias is crudely explicit". This view is shared by Peter M. Buzanski, who attributed Horton's anti-Turkish stance to his well-known "fanatic" philhellenism and his wife being Greek and wrote "During the Turkish capture of Smyrna, at the end of the Greco-Turkish War, Horton suffered a breakdown, resigned from the diplomatic service, and spent the balance of his life writing anti-Turkish, pro-Greek books." Scholar David Roessel shares a similar view, noting that except for his laments about materialism and the Great War, "Horton reverted to the philhellenic and anti-Turkish rhetoric" in his book.

Another criticism of his work was by Brian Coleman:

George Horton was a man of letters and United States Consul in Greece and Turkey at a time of social and political change. He writes of the re-taking of Smyrna by the Turkish army in September 1922. His account, however, goes beyond the blame and events to a demonization of Muslims, in general, and of Turks, in particular. In several of his novels, written more than two decades before the events of September 1922, he had already identified the Turk as the stock-in-trade villain of Western civilization. In his account of Smyrna, he writes not as historian, but as publicist.

==== Response to criticism ====
Several historians have defended Horton, criticizing the accusations thrown at him as misconceptions.

I. Lamb and C. Lamb, two historians who have co-authored a biography of Horton, dispute these criticisms one-by-one. For example, they note how Kırlı "made the usual disparaging remarks about Horton and Western scholarship, and added her own false claims", such as that Marjorie Dobkin's book on Smyrna is based on Horton's, which is demonstrably false. They also note how, despite her criticisms of Horton, she admits that he was "right about who burned Smyrna and why they did so". In addition, they state that Peter M. Buzanski has a "lack of familiarity" with George Horton, labeling all of his claims and assertions on Horton as "demonstrably false". They also criticized David Roessel's statement about Horton being anti-Turkish, which was made "in passing, with no evidence". Meanwhile, they described Brian Coleman's statements as such:

Brian Coleman was more even-handed. He described Horton as a philhellene who admired the elements of ancient Greek culture that contributed so much to Western Civilization. He thought Horton’s love of Western classics fueled his “moral courage” and desire “to tell the truth,” and that his testimony on Smyrna “still rings true” “eighty years later.” At the same time, Coleman argued that a Western orientation “nurtured Horton’s prejudice” and concluded Horton was guilty of “a demonization of Muslims in general and of Turks in particular.” He advised readers to “learn from both what is true and what is false” in Horton’s writings, but nowhere in his article did Coleman identify a single false statement Horton made.

Historian D.J. Ian Begg writes that, despite these accusations, "there is no reason to doubt [Horton's] factual accounts of events".

== Media coverage ==
The New York Times of September 21 carried a story from Athens attributed to the Associated Press, reporting Horton's account of events in Smyrna. It opened in quotation marks with "the manner in which" he had summarized for the AP: "During my consulship at Saloniki I was bombed by Bulgars and Germans and during my official career I have had many rough experiences with submarines and fire, but never in my life have I seen anything like the Smyrna catastrophe."

== Return to the United States ==
Horton's November arrival in New York City was covered by The New York Times primarily in regard to his transport for the American Archaeological Society of thirty gold coins found at Sardis. They were believed to be minted for Croesus, and to represent the earliest coinage of gold anywhere. The story introduced him as "Dr. George Horton, United States Consul General at Smyrna, where he witnessed the burning and sacking of the ancient seaport and the evacuation of 40,000 refugees in five days ..." and closed with two paragraphs on Smyrna service, including recent personal loss of property and upcoming consultation in Washington concerning missing Americans.

During the Smyrna catastrophe, Turkish military officer Nureddin Pasha had turned Metropolitan Chrysostomos over to an angry mob. The bishop was barbarically beaten, mutilated and killed. Horton reportedly said,

I have known Monsigneur Chrysostomos for years. He was an active and enthusiastic exponent of Greek ambitions and ideals which it seems to me was quite natural in him as a Greek ... Greeks set him down in their history as a hero and martyr.

== Personal life ==
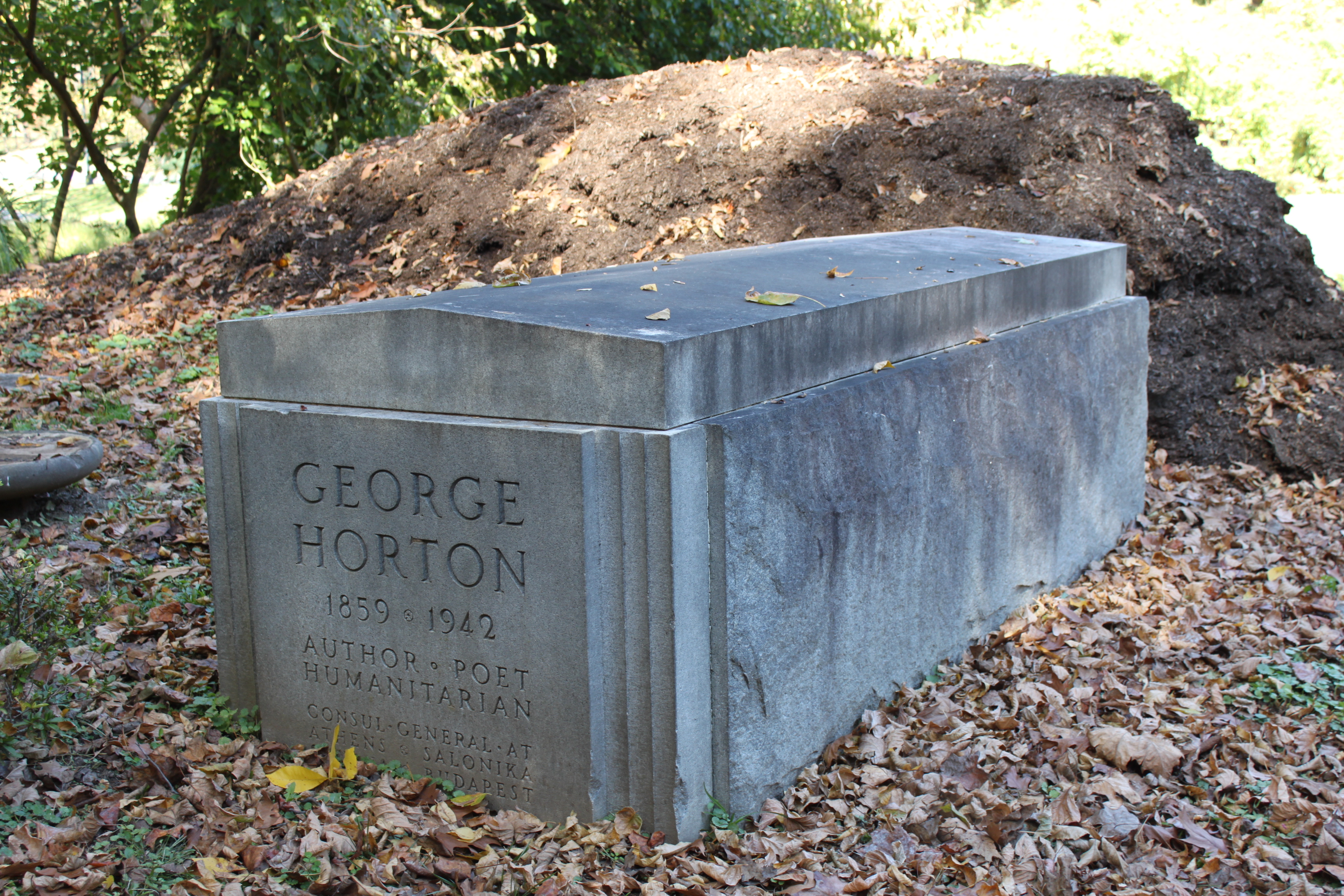
Grave of Horton at Oak Hill Cemetery

In 1909, Horton married Catherine Sakopoulos and they had one daughter, Nancy Horton. An Inspector of the Smyrna Consulate in 1912 found Horton to be a sensitive man and an easy-going old-school intellectual bohemian.

Horton died on June 5, 1942, after returning from Budapest on the Drottningholm. He was buried at Oak Hill Cemetery in Washington, D.C.

== See also ==
- Witnesses and testimonies of the Armenian genocide
