= Salonica vilayet =

Ottoman province in the Balkans

ولايت سلانيك Vilâyet-i Selânik
- Vilayet of the Ottoman Empire
- 1867–1913
- Flag

- The Salonica Vilayet in 1867–1913
- Capital: Salonica
- Population
  - 1911: 1,347,915
- History
  - Vilayet Law: 1867
  - First Balkan War: 1913
Preceded by
| Salonica Eyalet |
| Rumelia Eyalet |
Succeeded by
| Kingdom of Greece |
| Kingdom of Serbia |
| Kingdom of Bulgaria |
- Today part of: Greece; North Macedonia; Bulgaria

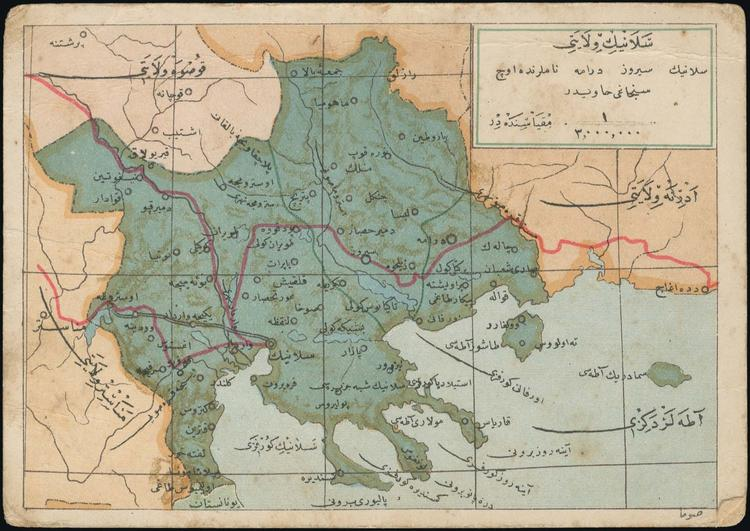
Contemporary Ottoman map of the Salonica Vilayet

The Vilayet of Salonica (Ottoman Turkish: ولايت سلانيك, romanized: Vilâyet-i Selânik) was a first-level administrative division (vilayet) of the Ottoman Empire from 1867 to 1913. In the late 19th century it reportedly had an area of 12,950 square miles (33,500 km^{2}).

The vilayet was bounded by the Principality (later Kingdom) of Bulgaria on the north; Eastern Rumelia on the northeast (after the Treaty of Berlin); Edirne Vilayet on the east; the Aegean Sea on the south; Monastir Vilayet and the independent sanjak of Serfije on the west (after 1881); the Kosovo Vilayet on the northwest.

The vilayet consisted of present Central and Eastern parts of Greek Macedonia and Pirin Macedonia in Bulgaria. Present Pirin Macedonia part of it was administered as kazas of Cuma-yı Bala, Petriç, Nevrekop, Menlik, Ropçoz and Razlık. It was dissolved after Balkan Wars and divided among Kingdom of Greece, Kingdom of Serbia and Tsardom of Bulgaria in 1913.

== Administrative divisions ==
Sanjaks of the Vilayet:

1. Sanjak of Selanik (Thessaloniki, Kesendire, Karaferye, Vodina, Yenice-i Vardar, Langaza, Kılkış (It was also called Avrathisar), Katrin, Aynaroz, Doyran, Usturumca, Tikveş, Gevgili)
2. Sanjak of Siroz (Serez, Zihne, Demirhisar, Razlık, Cuma-yı Bala, Menlik, Nevrekop)
3. Sanjak of Drama (Drama, Kavala, Sarışaban, Taşoz (It was later promoted to sanjak), Pravişte, Dövlen)
4. Sanjak of Taşoz (It was initially part of Sanjak of Drama, its center was Vulgaro)

== Demographics ==
According to the 1881/82-1893 Ottoman census the vilayet had a total population of 1.009.992 people, ethnically consisting as:

- Muslims - 450.456
- Greeks - 282.013
- Bulgarians - 231.606
- Jews - 41.984
- Catholics - 2.654
- Protestants - 329
- Armenians - 48
- Foreign citizens - 1.272

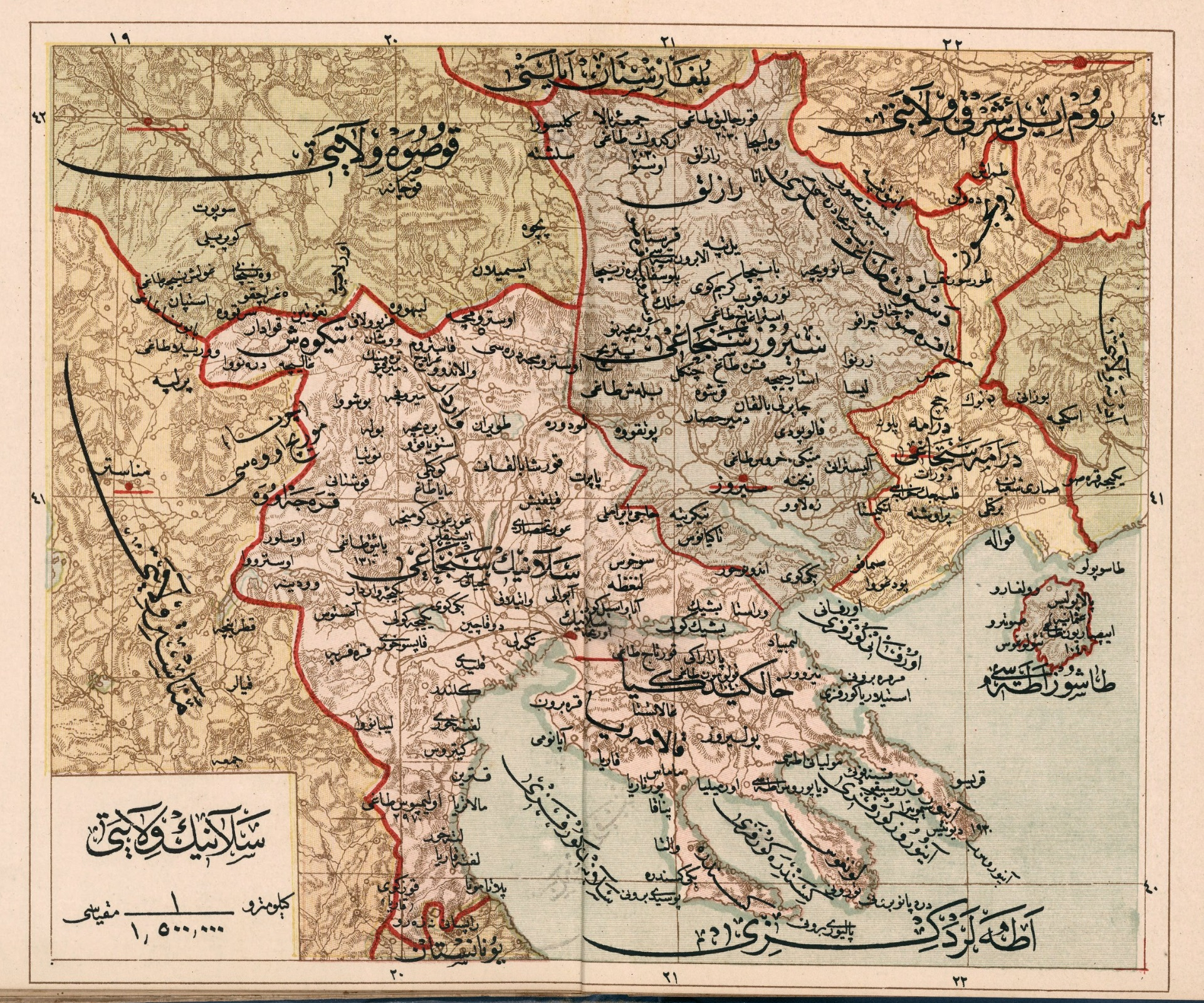
Map of subdivisions of Salonica Vilayet in 1907

Vilayet of Selanik (1881) Boundaries and Ethnic Makeup

According to the 1905/06 Ottoman Census, the vilayet had a total population of 921,359 people, ethnically consisting as:

- Muslims - 419.604
- Orthodox Greeks - 263.881
- Orthodox Bulgarians - 155.710
- Jews - 52.395
- Wallachians (Vlachs) - 20.486
- Gypsies - 4.736
- Catholic Greeks - 2.693
- Oriental Armenians - 637
- Protestants - 329
- Catholic Armenians - 58
- Latins - 31
- Syrians - 4
- Foreign citizens - 795

However, according to the Ottoman Archives, the Vilayet's main ethnoconfessional groups according to the 1905/06 Ottoman Census are:

- Muslims - 510,125
- Orthodox Greeks (Patriarchists) - 326,030
- Orthodox Bulgarians (Exarchists) - 229,422
- Jews - 52,645

By sanjaks, the four main ethnoconfessional groups number, as follows:

Sanjak
| Sanjak | Muslims | % | Greeks | % | Bulgarians | % | Jews | % | Total | % |
|---|---|---|---|---|---|---|---|---|---|---|
| Sanjak of Selanik | 233,098 | 39.8 | 211,389 | 36.1 | 92,752 | 15.8 | 49,889 | 8.3 | 586,128 | 100.00 |
| Sanjak of Siroz | 150,045 | 41.1 | 82,334 | 22.5 | 131,476 | 39.3 | 1,580 | 0.4 | 365,435 | 100.00 |
| Sanjak of Drama | 126,982 | 76.2 | 32,307 | 19.4 | 5,194 | 3.1 | 2,176 | 1.3 | 166,659 | 100.00 |
| Total | 510,125 | 45.6 | 326,030 | 29.1 | 229,422 | 20.5 | 52,645 | 4.7 | 1,118,222 | 100.0 |

According to an estimate by Aram Andonian in 1908 there was the following ethnic distribution in the vilayet:

- Orthodox Bulgarians - 446,050
- Muslim Turks - 333,440
- Orthodox Greeks - 168,500
- Muslim Bulgarians - 98,590
- Jews - 55,320
- Orthodox Vlachs - 24,970
- Muslim Gypsies - 22,200
- Mixed - 16,320

Historians, however, have criticized the reliability of Andonian's estimates, citing their uncertain sources and date, substantial discrepancies with contemporary population statistics, inconsistencies between the population tables, and an apparent intention to heavily exaggerate the numbers of the Bulgarian population.

== Governors ==
- Mehmet Akif Pasha (June 1867 - February 1869)
- Mehmed Sabri Pasha (February 1869 - September 1871)
- Kekimbashi Ismail Pasha (September 1871 - May 1872)
- Hurshid Pasha (May 1872 - August 1872)
- Kücük Ömer Fevzi Pasha (1st time) (August 1872 - May 1873)
- Mehmet Akif Pasha (3rd time) (May 1873 - September 1873)
- Ahmed Midhat Sefik Pasha (October 1873 - February 1874)
- Kücük Ömer Fevzi Pasha (2nd time) (February 1874 - September 1875)
- Baytar Mehmed Refet Pasha (December 1875 - June 1876)
- Mustafa Esref Pasha (June 1876 - April 1877)
- Cerkez Nusret Pasha (June 1877 - December 1877)
- Ibrahim Halil Pasha (December 1877 - July 1878)
- Halil Rifat Pasha (July 1878 - March 1880)
- Abidin Pasha (March 1880 - June 1880)
- Lofçali Ibrahim Dervish Pasha (August 1880 - January 1882)
- Ismail Hakki Pasha (March 1882 - September 1885)
- Hasan Hakki Pasha (September 1885 - August 1886)
- Abdullah Galib Pasha (August 1886 - August 1891)
- Mustafa Zihni Pasha (October 1891 - November 1895)
- Hasan Fehmi Pasha (1st time) (1895)
- Ramazanoglu Hüseyin Riza Pasha (January 1896 - January 1899)
- Haci Hasan Refik Pasha (January 1899 - May 1901)
- Biren Mahmud Tevfik Beg (May 1901 - May 1902)
- Hasan Fehmi Pasha (2nd time) (May 1902 - September 1904)
- Mehmed Sherif Ra'uf Pasha (September 1904 - August 1908)
- Ali Danis Beg (August 1908 - September 1909)
- Pirizade Ibrahim Hayrullah Bey (September 1909 - January 1912)
- Kadri Huseyin Kazim Bey (January 1912 - 8 August 1912)
- Ali Ferid Pasha (August 1912 - September 1912)
