= Mehmet Akif Pasha =

Ottoman-Albanian statesman

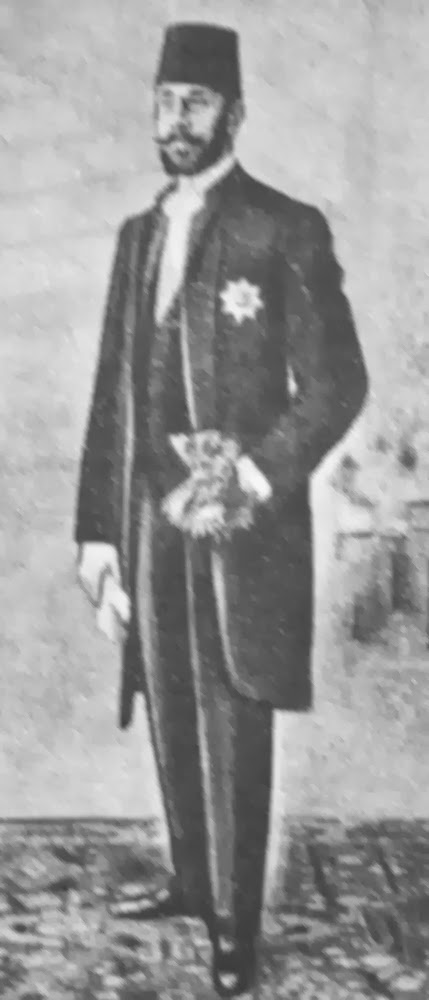

Personal details
- Born: 1822 Kalkandelen, Kosovo Vilayet, Ottoman Empire
- Died: 1893 (aged 71) Çanakkale, Vilayet of the Archipelago, Ottoman Empire
- Resting place: Fatih Mosque, Istanbul, Turkey

Mehmet Akif Pasha (1822–1893), also known as Arnavut Mehmet Akif Pasha (Mehmet Akif Pasha the Albanian) or Kalkandereli Mehmet Akif Pasha, was an Ottoman-Albanian statesman and governor in the Ottoman Empire. From 1860 to 1893, he was the governor of Salonica Vilayet, Danube Vilayet, Bosnia Vilayet, Prizren Vilayet, Janina Vilayet, Adrianople Vilayet, Baghdad Vilayet, Konya Vilayet, Vilayet of the Archipelago.
