= Miriam K. Hughes =

American diplomat

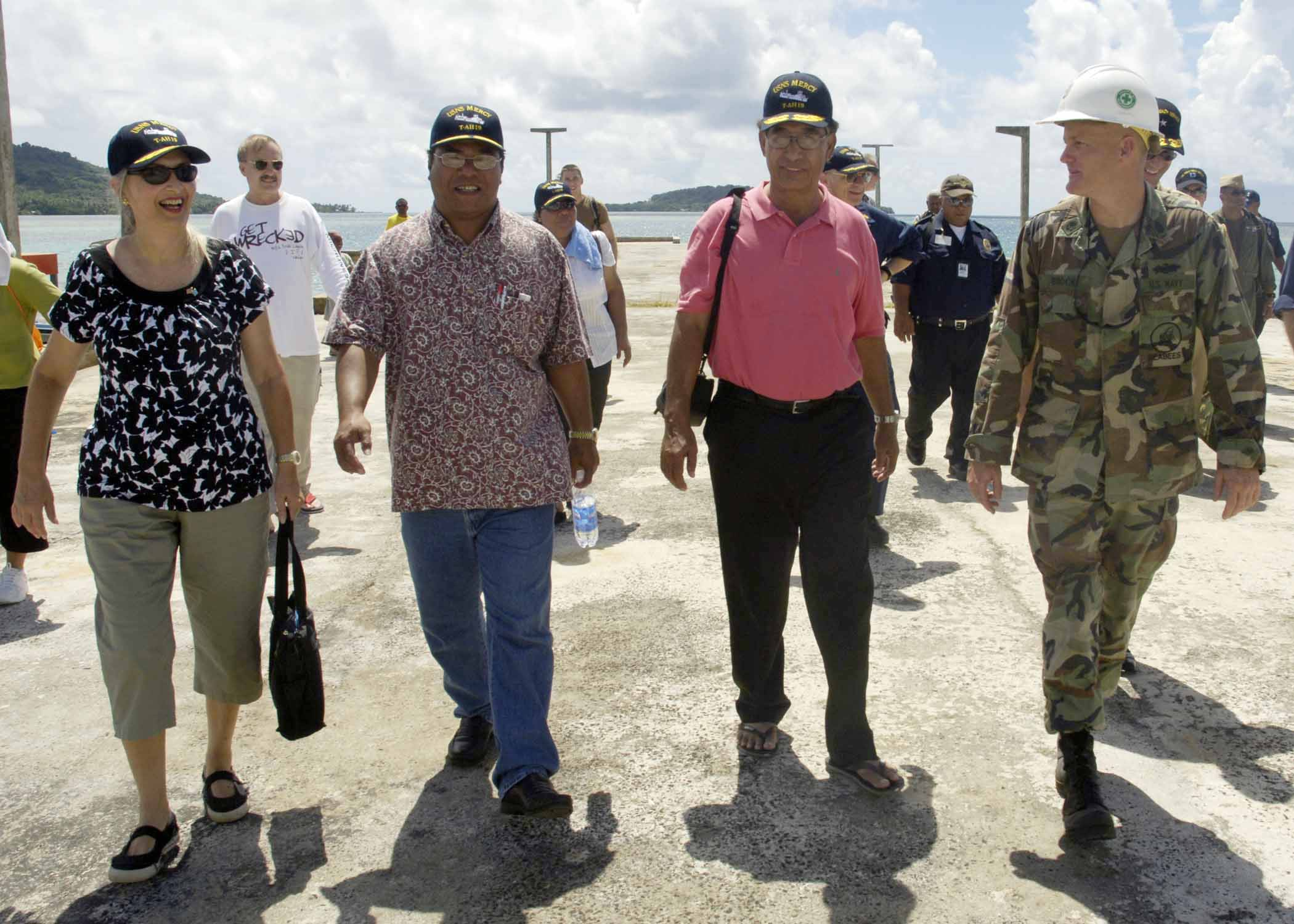
US Navy 080825-N-0209M-009 The Honorable Manny Mori, left, The Honorable Miriam K. Hughes, The Honorable Governor of the Federated States of Micronesia Wesley Simina, and EOC James Brock walk together during a tour of an Engineering Civic Action Program

Miriam “Mimi” K. Hughes (born 1945, New York City) served as the seventh U.S. Ambassador to the Federated States of Micronesia having been sworn in on August 2, 2007. A member of the Senior Foreign Service, she held the rank of Minister Counselor. She also served as Consul General in Mexico City.

Hughes earned a BA degree in government from Barnard College.
