= Consulate General of the United States, Thessaloniki =

US consulate for Northern Greece

Coordinates: 40.63369°N 22.94246°E

Consulate General of the United States to Thessaloniki (Greece)
- Seal of the United States Department of State
- Incumbent; Jerrier (Jerry) Ismail since August 2023
- Inaugural holder: Pericles Hadji Lazzaro
- Formation: 1870
- Website: gr.usembassy.gov

The Consulate General of the United States in Thessaloniki is the focal point for events relating to the United States in northern Greece. The consulate is situated on the 7th floor of a commercial office building at 43 Tsimiski Street in the city center. The consulate is headed by the Principal Officer and employs locally hired individuals.

== History ==
=== Before World War I ===
Though the exact details concerning the establishment of a consulate in Thessaloniki are sparse, it is a fact that a consular agency was initially established in Thessaloniki during the Ottoman era, as early as the 1830s, to represent American shipping interests in the northern Aegean Sea. A Thessalonian named Pericles Hadji Lazzaro later became the first honorary American consular agent in 1870. On June 10, 1908 the agency was upgraded to a Consulate status, at which time Evan E. Young was appointed as the first American Consul. Between 1910 and 1911, George Horton represented the US Consul at Salonika. During the period of time leading up to World War I, the consulate played a mostly commercial and representational role in Thessaloniki due to the lack of visa requirements for U.S. travel and due to the small number of Americans both living in and passing through the city. Dr. Henry House was one of the few prominent Americans living in Thessaloniki during this period. Dr. House established the American Farm School, which is still in operation today.

=== Impact of the World Wars ===
During the 1920s, due to new visa requirements and the restructuring of the city following the Great Thessaloniki Fire of 1917, the consulate was characterized by significant growth. Consul James H. Keeley, whose son Robert V. Keeley would later serve as Ambassador to Greece from 1985 to 1989, was appointed as principal officer of the consulate from 1936 until the outbreak of World War II in 1939.

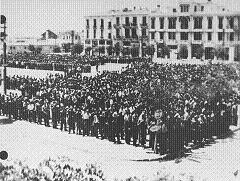
The adult Jewish male population of Thessaloniki being rounded up at Platia Eleftherias by German soldiers

The Germans occupied Thessaloniki from April 1941 until October 1944 and closed the consulate on July 11, 1941. During this occupation, three of the consulate's Greek employees- David Tiano, Emmanuel Karasso, and John Vafiades – (the two former being of Jewish extraction) were all sent to an internment camp in Thessaloniki. Tiano was executed, while Karasso and Vafiades survived. Following the war, they resumed work at the consulate at its re-opening in 1944. The reception room in the consulate, otherwise known as the David Tiano room, is dedicated to his memory, and the consulate acknowledges his service and sacrifice with an annual David Tiano Lecture.

=== Post World War II years ===
In 1944, following the departure of the German forces, William M. Gwynn assumed the role as Consul and relocated the consulate to 59 Nikis Avenue, where it remained until its most recent move in 1999.

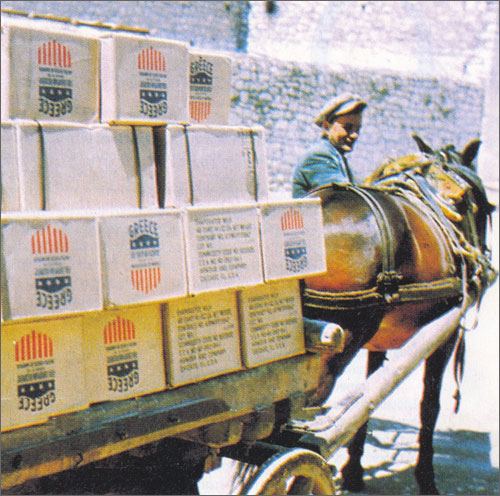
A donkey carrying U.S.-funded supplies in Greece as part of the Truman Doctrine

During the post World War II years the consulate transformed its role in Thessaloniki, reflecting the evolving relationship between America and Greece. The consulate supported the restoration efforts of the American Farm School and Anatolia College, both of which had been used as headquarters of the German forces. At this time, Greece was recovering from the devastation of the Second World War and, as the British were not in a position to help, the U.S. filled the void through both the Truman Doctrine and the closely related Marshall Plan, supporting Greece with roughly $300 million in military and economic aid.

In 1952, the consulate was elevated to the rank of Consulate General and, over the next decade, a strong relationship developed between Thessalonians and the consulate. During the 1960s, the consulate began working with an increasing American business presence in the city which accompanied the Greek Economic Miracle. The consulate also engaged in sensitive border issues involving Bulgaria, Yugoslavia, and Albania.

The 1967 Greek military junta coup and the Cyprus Crisis damaged the American image across Greece. Thus, during the 1970s, the consulate began to focus more on improving public relations through an active outreach program to neighboring provincial cities in northern Greece. This decade was a hectic one for the consulate General as it dealt with several drug trafficking cases originating in the Middle East and Africa. The former U.S. Deputy Secretary of State, John Dimitri Negroponte, served at the post from 1975 to 1977.

1999 marked a final move to the consulate's present location in a suite on the seventh floor of 43 Tsimiski. At present, the United States has had an official presence in Thessaloniki for nearly 177 years. There have been 19 Consuls General and 16 Consuls.

=== Principal officers ===
Name	Date
Consular Agent Pericles Hadji Lazzaro	1870 - 1906
Consul Russel	1906 - 1908
Consul Evan E. Young	Nov. 1, 1908 - Jan. 29, 1910
Consul George Horton	Jan. 30, 1910 - Aug. 5, 1911
Consul John E. Kehl	Dec. 12, 1911 - late 1915
Consul Leland B. Morris	late 1915 - 1921
Consul Fernald	1927
Consul Charles J. Pisar	1927 - May 1932
Consul Paul Bowerman	June 1932 - 1933 (8 months)
Consul Harry L. Troutman	1933 - 1936
Consul Hanson	1936 (a few months only)
Consul James H. Keeley	1936 - Aug. 1939
Consul John D. Johnson	fall 1939 - July 11, 1941

Consulate closed by order of German Reich on July 11, 1941

Consul William M. Gwynn	Dec. 14, 1944 - Jan. 30, 1947
Consul Raleigh A. Gibson	Jan. 31, 1947 - Oct. 5, 1949
Consul Glenn A. Abbey	Feb. 5, 1950 - Sept. 20, 1951
Consul General John B. Holt	Sept. 21, 1951 - Jul. 19, 1954

In 1952 the consulate was elevated to the rank of Consulate General

Consul General Murat W. Williams	July 30, 1954 - June 1, 1955
Consul General Philip W. Ireland	Sept. 13, 1955 - Oct. 21, 1958
Consul General Robert S. Folsom	Oct. 21, 1958 - Aug. 19, 1964
Consul General William L. Hamilton	Oct. 21, 1964 - March 5, 1970
Consul General A. David Fritzlan	Mar. 15, 1970 - June 22, 1971
Consul General Edward T. Brennan	July 29, 1971 - Oct. 31, 1975
Consul General John D. Negroponte	Oct. 28, 1975 - June 30, 1977
Consul General Dan A. Zachary	July 13, 1977 - Sept. 15, 1981
Consul General Michael D. Sternberg	Sept. 3, 1981 - June 21, 1985
Consul General A. Donald Bramante	Aug. 22, 1985 - Aug. 15, 1989
Consul General Larry C. Thompson	Aug. 11, 1989 - June 8, 1991
Consul General James E. Blanford	July 3, 1991 - May 4, 1994
Consul General Miriam K. Hughes	July 17, 1994 - July 14, 1997
Consul General Paul D. Stephenson	July 22, 1997 - June 13, 2000
Consul General John M. Koenig	June 27, 2000 - June 30, 2003
Consul General Alec L. Mally	July 2003 - March 2004
Consul General Demitra M. Pappas	April 2004 - June 2006
Consul General Hoyt B. Yee	August 2006 - July 2009
Consul General Catherine E. Kay	August 2009 - June 2012
Consul Robert P. Sanders	September 2012 - July 2015
Consul Rebecca A. Fong	August 2015 - July 2018
Consul Gregory W. Pfleger, Jr.	August 2018 - July 2020
Consul Elizabeth K. Lee	August 2020 -

=== Closure of the U.S. Consulate in Thessaloniki ===
In 2013, the United States government permanently closed its Consulate General in Thessaloniki as part of broader budget cuts. The consulate officially ceased operations on May 31, 2013. Outgoing Consul-General Marsha Lance explained that Americans in northern Greece requiring consular services would now need to contact the American Embassy in Athens. The closure followed a recommendation from the U.S. State Department Inspector General in 2011 and affected both American and locally hired staff at the consulate, which had been located at 43 Tsimiski Street in the city center.

== Other noteworthy events and news ==
- The consulate has played a significant role in many high-profile cases such as the George Polk investigation of 1948. The mysterious death of American journalist George Polk has long bewildered Americans and Greeks alike. Polk, who arrived in Thessaloniki in the spring of 1948, had attempted to contact the leader of the Andartes resistance group, only to disappear. Polk's body was found having been murdered, execution-style, and speculation and accusations were rampant as to who was responsible for his assassination. The Consul General at the time, Raleigh A. Gibson, invested a considerable amount of time on the case. The Salonika Bay Murder: Cold War Politics and the Polk Affair, a book written by Edmund Keeley, brother to aforementioned Robert Keeley, critically analyzes the case.
- The consulate has its own competitive football team, The Eagles, who claim to be undefeated in official matches.
- In the book Midnight Express, based on actual events, Billy Hayes found asylum at the Consulate General in Thessaloniki following an escape from a prison in Istanbul in which he had spent almost five years.
- The consulate has received a number of prominent celebrities. Most recently, former Massachusetts Governor Michael Dukakis visited the consulate and gave a lecture in 2007; other visitors have included Nobel Laureate and Holocaust survivor Elie Wiesel, actress Faye Dunaway, five-time Academy Award winning film director Francis Ford Coppola, film director Sofia Coppola, production designer Dean Tavoularis, former U.S. Secretaries of Defense William Cohen and Donald Rumsfeld, Tipper Gore, and actress and singer Juliette Lewis.
