= Salonica Eyalet =

Administrative division of the Ottoman Empire from 1826 to 1867

Eyalet-i Selanik
- Eyalet of the Ottoman Empire
- 1826–1867
- Flag

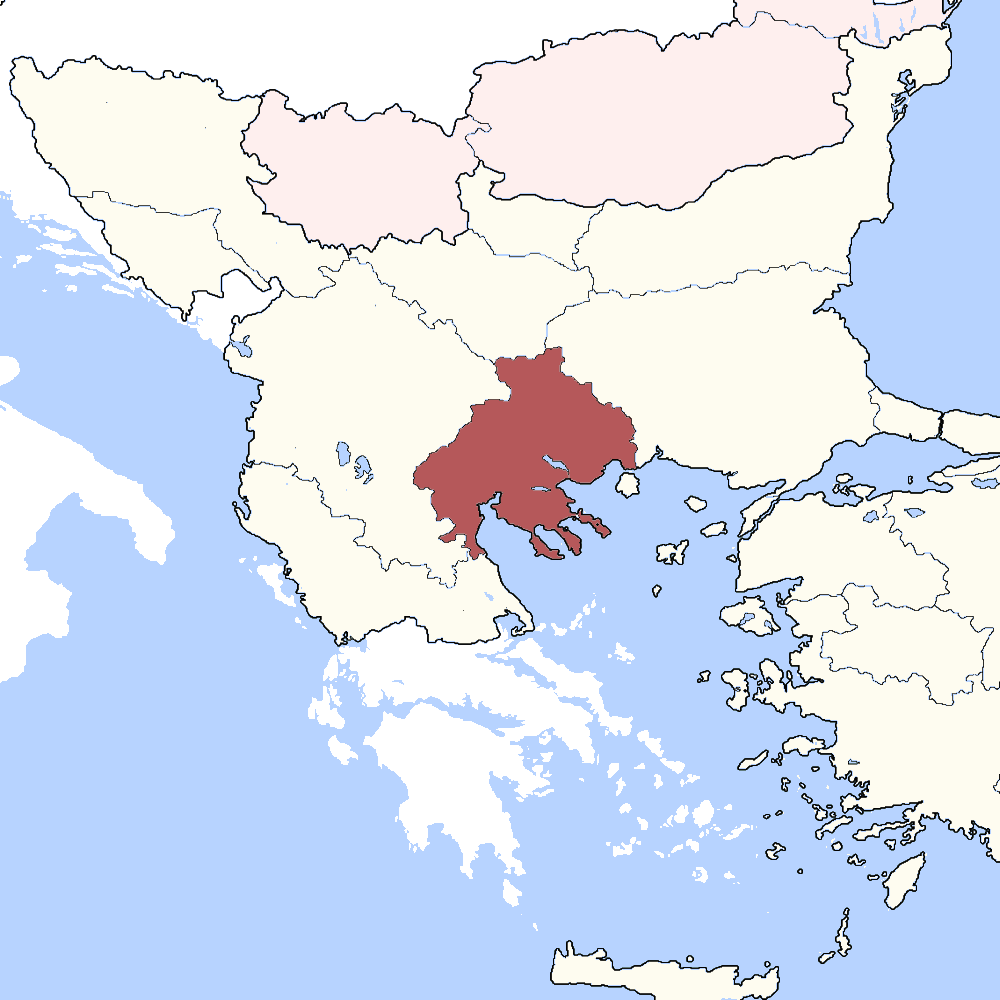
- The Salonica Eyalet in the 1850s
- Capital: Salonica
- Area
  - Coordinates: 40°39′N 22°54′E
- History
  - Established: 1826
  - Transformation into vilayet: 1867
Preceded by	Succeeded by
Rumelia Eyalet	Salonica Vilayet

Salonica Eyalet (Ottoman Turkish: ایالت سلانیك; Eyālet-i Selānīk) was an eyalet of the Ottoman Empire.

== Administrative divisions ==
Sanjaks of the Eyalet in the mid-19th century:

1. Sanjak of Tirhala (Trikala)
2. Sanjak of Selanik (Thessalonica)
3. Sanjak of Siroz (Serres)
4. Sanjak of Drama

== Governors ==
Governors of the eyalet:

- Mehmed Hasib Pasha (September 1839 - February 1840)
- Mehmed Emin Pasha (February 1840 - July 1840)
- Kizilhisarli ömer Pasha (July 1840 - July 1843)
- Sirozlu Ibrahim Pasha (July 1843 - October 1843)
- Gürcü Mehmed Vasif Pasha (October 1843 - September 1845)
- Gümrükcü Mehmed Salih Pasha (September 1845 - April 1846)
- Kara Osmanzade Yaqub Pasha (April 1846 - May 1847)
- Dede Mustafa Hifzi Pasha (May 1847 - September 1848)
- Egribozlu Ebubekir Sami Pasha (September 1848 - August 1849)
- Cihan Seraskeri Hasan Riza Pasha (August 1849 - July 1850)
- Kara Osmanzade Yakub Pasha (July 1850 - November 1851)
- Celalatzade/Evrenoszade Yusuf Siddiq Mehmed Pasha (November 1851 - May 1853)
- Gümrükcü Mehmed Salih Pasha (May 1853 - July 1853)
- Ebubekir Rüstem Pasha (August 1853 - February 1854)
- Bosnakzade Mehmed Reshid Pasha (February 1854 - July 1854)
- Osman Mazhar Pasha (July 1854 - September 1855)
- Sirkatibi Mustafa Nuri Pasha (September 1855 - May 1856)
- Ahmed Nazir Pasha (May 1856 - May 1857)
- Abdi Pasha (1857)
- Yozgatli Mehmed Vecihi Pasha (October 1857 - September 1858)
- Mirza/Tatar Mehmed Said Pasha (November 1858 - August 1859)
- Tepedelenlizade Ismail Rahmi Pasha (August 1859 - January 1860)
- Arnavud Mehmet Akif Pasha (1st time) (January 1860 - January 1865)
- Huseyin Hüsnü Pasha (January 1865 - December 1866)
- Ahmed Ala Bey (1867)
