= Sanjak of Salonica =

Province of historical Ottoman Empire

Sanjak of Selonica سنجاق سلانیك Σαντζάκι Θεσσαλονίκης
- Sanjak of the Ottoman Empire
- 1430–1912
- A map of Salonica Sanjak within the Salonica Vilayet (c. 1900)
- Capital: Thessalonica (Selanik)
- History
  - Ottoman conquest: 1430
  - Greek capture: 1912
Preceded by	Succeeded by
Republic of Venice	Thessaloniki; Vardar Macedonia
- Today part of: Greece; North Macedonia

The Sanjak of Salonica, Selanik (Ottoman Turkish: سنجاق سلانیك, Sancağı-i Selânik), or Thessalonica (Greek: Σαντζάκι Θεσσαλονίκης, Santzáki Thessaloníkis) was a sanjak of the Ottoman Empire. It was named for its capital Salonica, also known by its Turkish name Selanik and its latinized Greek name Thessalonica. It was also known under the Ottomans as the Liva of Salonica &c. (لواء سلانیك, Livâ-i Selânik; Λιβάς Θεσσαλονίκης, Libás Thessaloníkis). The sanjak existed from its formation in 1430 as part of the Rumeli Eyalet until its conquest in the First Balkan War in 1912 and its reorganization in 1915 as the Thessalonica Prefecture of the Kingdom of Greece. It served as the pasha sanjak of the Eyalet of Salonica from 1846–1867 and of the Vilayet of Salonica from 1867–1912.

== History ==
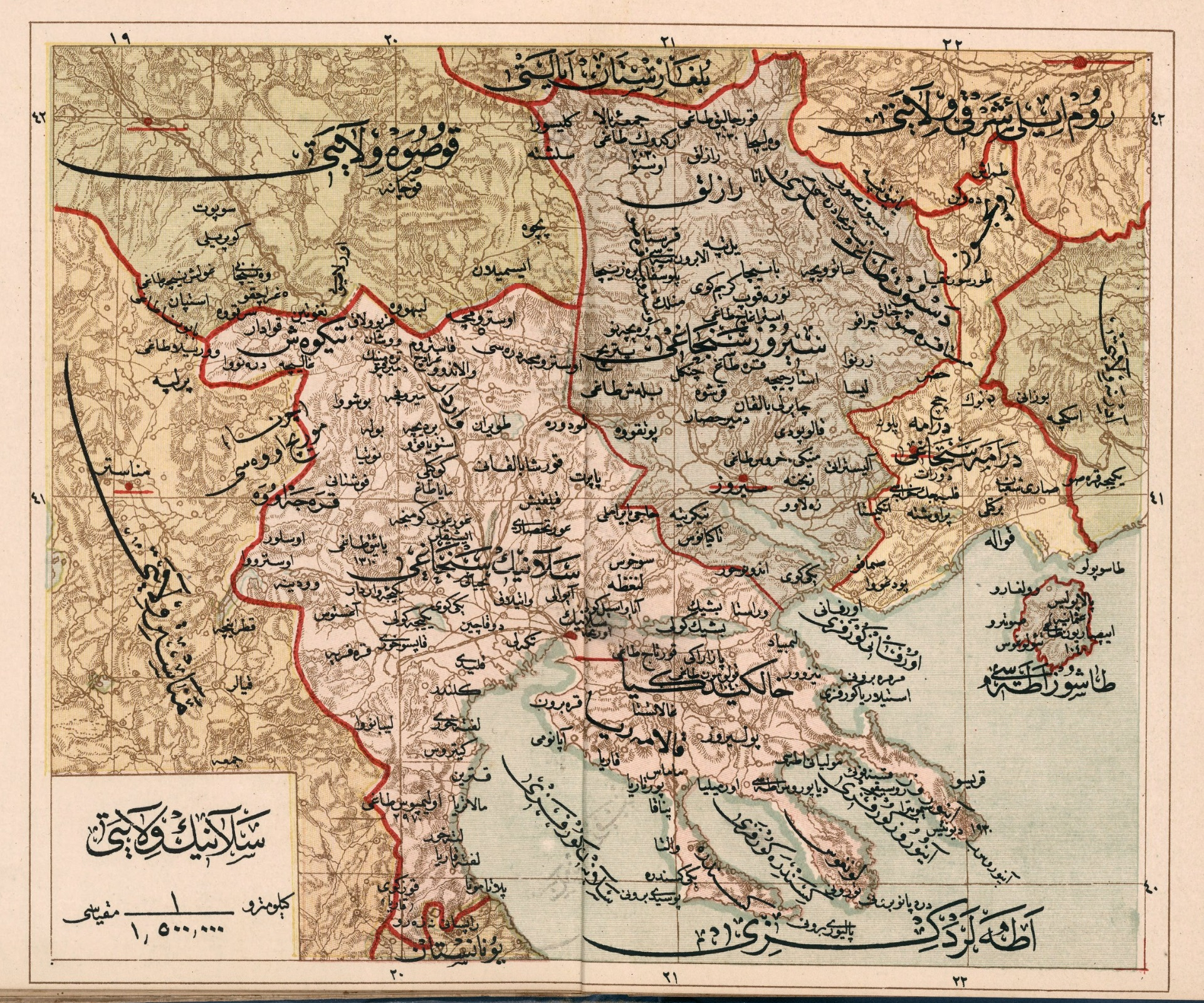
1907 Ottoman map of the Salonica Vilayet, including the Sanjak of Salonica in the left

A year into the Ottoman siege of Thessalonica, its governor Andronikos Palaiologos ceded control of the city to the Republic of Venice in September 1423 in exchange for their commitment to keep the city out of Turkish hands. After the Ottomans finally occupied the city in 1430, its hinterland was organized as the Salonica Sanjak of the Rumeli Eyalet, encompassing the Chalcidice Peninsula and Macedonia between the Vardar and Aliakmon Rivers.

As part of the Tanzimat reforms, Salonica was elevated to the capital of the new province of Salonica Eyalet in 1846. This was reorganized in 1867 as the Salonica Vilayet. Its immediate sanjak then became the provincial pasha-sanjak.

At the outbreak of the First Balkan War in 1912, Salonica Sanjak comprised the following kazas: Selanik (Thessalonica), Kesendire (Kassandra Peninsula), Karaferye (Veroia), Yenice Vardar (Giannitsa), Vodina (Edessa), Langaza (Langadas), Gevgelü (Gevgelija), Avret Hişar (Neo Gynaikokastro), Toyran (Star Dojran), Ustrumca (Strumica), Tikoş/Kavadar (Kavadarci), Katerin (Katerini), Aynaroz (Mount Athos) and Karâğâbad.

Most of the sanjak was captured by the army of the Kingdom of Greece in October 1912 with Thessalonica falling on the 26th, but its northern portions fell to Serbia and are now part of North Macedonia. King Constantine I had demanded control of the Greek-occupied districts of Macedonia but the prime minister Eleftherios Venizelos created a governorate and named his minister of Justice Konstantinos Raktivan to head it instead. The new Governorate of Macedonia kept the Ottoman administration and officials in place until prefectures were established by royal decree in 1915. The Ottoman kazas were then renamed subgovernates (υποδιοικήσεις, ypodioikíseis) and overseen by governate commissioners (διοικητικοί επίτροποι, dioikitikoí epítropoi) nominated by the governor-general.

== Governors ==
- Bekir Pasha (1805)
