= 1906 in the Ottoman Empire =

- Decades: 1880s; 1890s; 1900s; 1910s; 1920s
- See also: Other events of 1906; List of years in the Ottoman Empire

The following lists events that happened during 1906 in the Ottoman Empire.

== Incumbents ==
- Sultan: Abdul Hamid II
- Grand Vizier: Mehmed Ferid Pasha

== Ongoing conflicts ==
Name	Start	End	Description
Macedonian Struggle	1893	1912	The Macedonian Struggle was a series of social, political, cultural and military conflicts that were mainly fought between Greek and Bulgarian subjects who lived in Ottoman Macedonia between 1893 and 1912. The region quickly became a constant battleground among various armed groups, with hostilities peaking in 1904–1908.
Ottoman invasion of Persia	1906	1911	An Ottoman invasion of Persia took place in 1906 on the orders of the vali of Baghdad. Persia was then under the rule of the Qajar dynasty. The invasion of Persia by the Ottoman Empire occurred during the Persian Constitutional Revolution, and the Ottoman troops were driven out by Russian troops prior to the First World War.
1906 Mesopotamia uprising	1906	1906	The 1906 Mesopotamia uprising was an uprising of Mesopotamian tribes in the Ottoman Empire, fought due to the refusal of the Ottoman government to allow for 10 day truce to investigate losses in the Yemeni Expedition of 1905. The uprising saw tribes holding up navigation across the Tigris River.
Yemeni-Ottoman War	1904	1911	Conflict in Yemen had reignited in 1904. In August 1906, an Ottoman delegation arrived to the Imam, expressing the desire to re-open negotiations, to which the Imam reportedly responded with by stating his desire to end the bloodshed.
Taba Crisis	1906	1906	The Taba Crisis or "Aqaba Crisis" was a diplomatic conflict arising from territorial disputes between the British in Egypt and the Ottomans in Palestine at the beginning of the 20th century. Although largely forgotten over time, it holds significant importance in political history: in conjunction with preceding events, it nearly precipitated the outbreak of a conflict that foreshadowed World War I as early as 1906. Its aftermath also led to the emergence of the Negev as a distinct region, ultimately incorporated into Palestine as a "historical accident."

== Census ==
1905–1906 census of the Ottoman Empire was the last population count. This census effort concentrated on Iraq and Arabian Peninsula as European and Anatolian has well established. Ottoman government decided to perform the count in three months compared to years during the ones performed 19th century.

== Bibliography ==
- Karpat, K.H. (1985). Ottoman population, 1830-1914: demographic and social characteristics. Madison, Wis: University of Wisconsin Pres. p. 242.
