= 1881–1882 census of the Ottoman Empire =

1881–1882 census of the population of the Ottoman Empire

1881–1882 census of the Ottoman Empire (Note: 81-82 is result of conversion to Georgian calendar.) was a multi-year census effort that the preparations for the forms and registration committees finished in 1884-1885 (also refereed as 1881-1883 census) which from this date a continuous flow of information collected with yearly reports until final record issued in 1893 (also refereed as 1881-1893 census). The first official census (1881–1893) took 10 years to finish. Grand Vizier Cevat Pasha submitted the census records in a bound manuscript to the sultan, Abdulhamid II. (Note: this data used by westerners to generate the graphical and tabular analysis 1893-1896 represent the most complete and reliable data in 19th century)

== Bibliography ==
- Karpat, K.H. (1985). Ottoman population, 1830-1914: demographic and social characteristics. Madison, Wis: University of Wisconsin Pres. pp. 242.
