= Bulgarian Turks =

Ethnic group

Bulgarian Turks; български турци (Bulgarian); Bulgaristan Türkleri (Turkish)
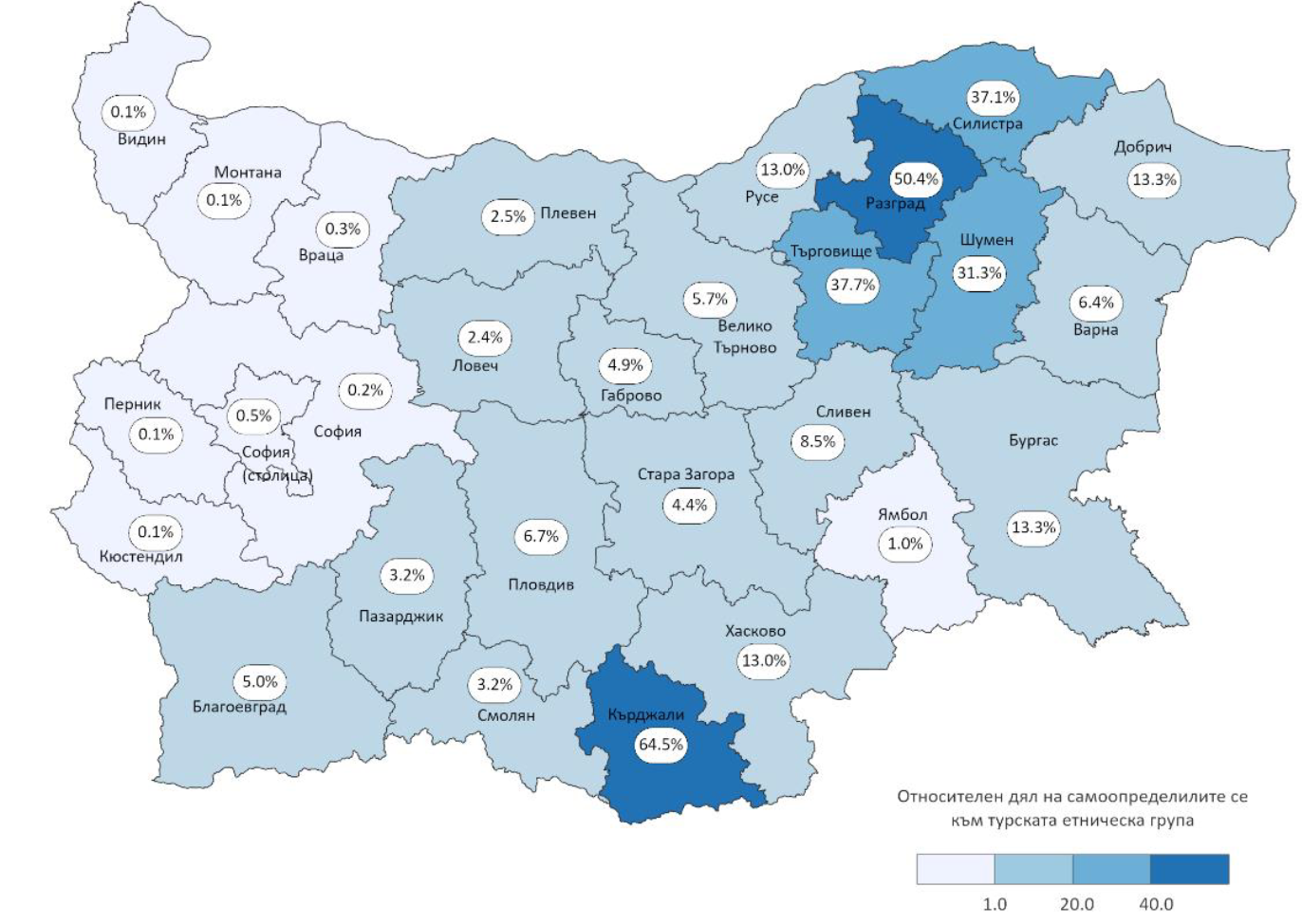

Regions with significant populations
- Ludogorie; Rhodopes; Southern Dobruja
- Bulgaria: 508,375 (2021)
- Turkey: 326,000 (2005)
- Netherlands: 10,000–30,000
- Sweden: 500
- Northern Cyprus: 2,000 – 10,000
- Belgium: 4,807
- Austria: 1,000

Languages
- Turkish · Bulgarian

Religion
- Predominantly Islam (Majority: Sunni, Minority: non-denominational), also including Sufism (Alevism and Bektashism)

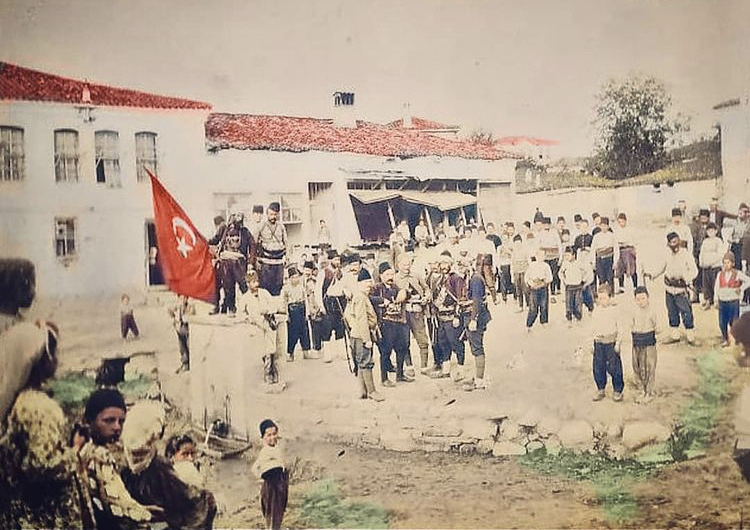
Voluntary Turkish soldiers in Kardzali Streets during independence movement of Turkish Republic of Western Thrace, 1913

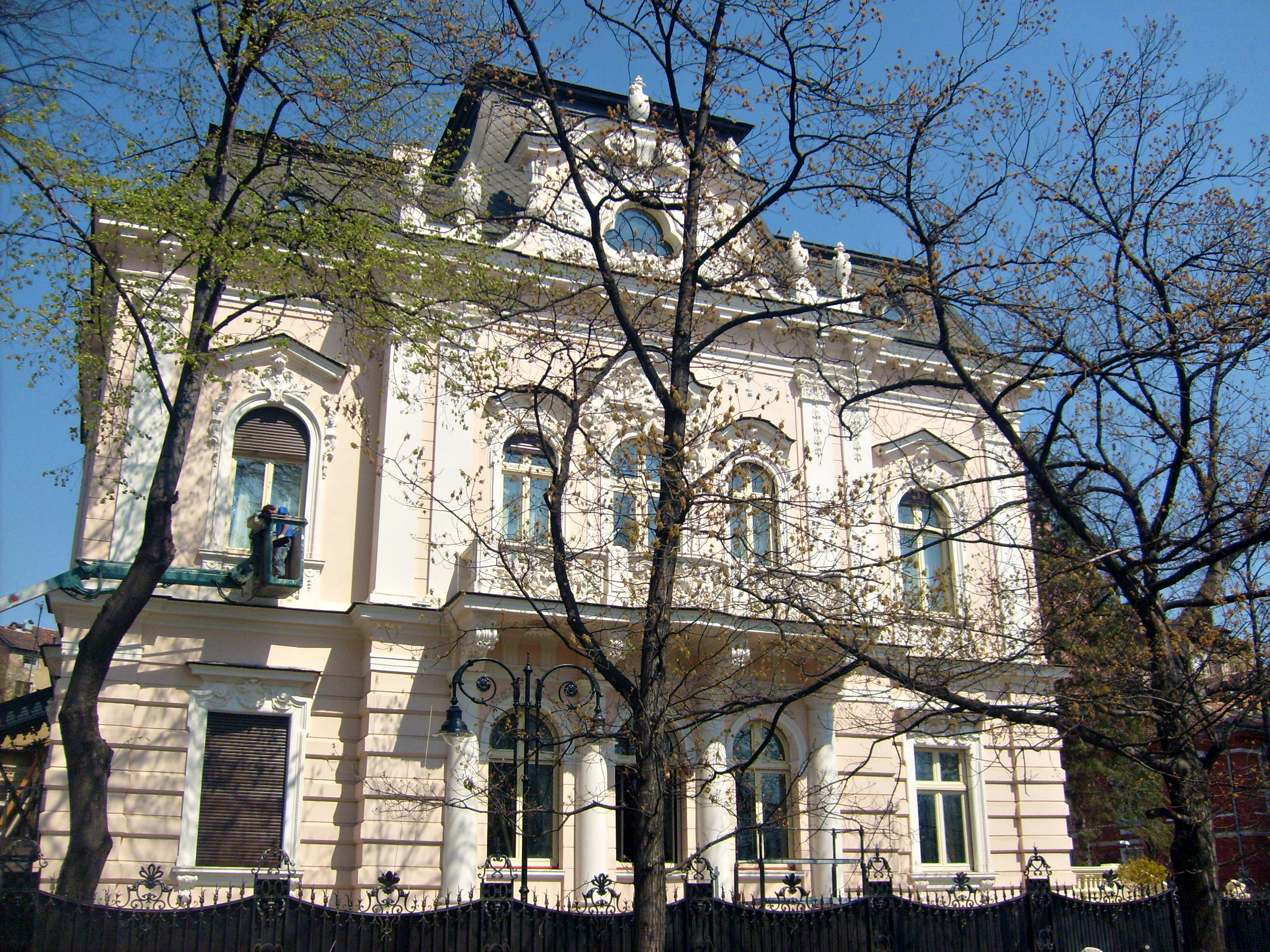
Turkish Embassy in Sofia, Bulgaria

Bulgarian Turks (Bulgarian: български турци; Turkish: Bulgaristan Türkleri) are ethnic Turkish people from Bulgaria. According to the 2021 census, there were 508,375 Bulgarians of Turkish descent, roughly 8.4% of the population, making them the country's largest ethnic minority. Bulgarian Turks also comprise the largest single population of Turks in the Balkans. They primarily live in the southern province of Kardzhali and the northeastern provinces of Shumen, Silistra, Razgrad and Targovishte. There is also a diaspora outside Bulgaria in countries such as Turkey, Austria, the Netherlands, Sweden, Norway and Romania, the most significant of which are the Bulgarian Turks in Turkey.

Bulgarian Turks are the descendants of Turkish settlers who entered the region after the Ottoman conquest of the Balkans in the late 14th and early 15th centuries, as well as Bulgarian converts to Islam who became Turkified during the centuries of Ottoman rule. However, it has also been suggested that some Turks living today in Bulgaria may be direct ethnic descendants of earlier medieval Pecheneg, Oghuz, and Cuman Turkic tribes. According to local tradition, following a resettlement policy Karamanid Turks (mainly from the Konya Vilayet, Nevşehir Vilayet and Niğde Vilayet of the Karaman Province) were settled mainly in the Kardzhali area by the sultans Mehmed the Conqueror, Selim and Mahmud II. The Turkish community became an ethnic minority when the Principality of Bulgaria was established after the Russo-Turkish War of 1877–78. This community is of Turkish ethnic consciousness and differs from the majority Bulgarian ethnicity and the rest of the Bulgarian nation by its own language, religion, culture, customs, and traditions.

== Genetic origins ==
DNA research investigating the three largest population groups in Bulgaria: Bulgarians, Turks and Roma confirms with Y-chromosomal analysis on STR that there are significant differences between the three ethnic groups. The study revealed a high number of population-specific haplotypes, 54 haplotypes among 63 tested Turkish males from the Bulgarian DNA bank and fathers from routine paternity cases born in various geographical regions of Bulgaria. The haplotypes of the Turks from Bulgaria as converted to haplogroups make up the following frequencies: J2 (18%), I2 (13%), E (13%), H (11%), R1a (10%), R1b (8%), I1 (6%), J1 (6%), G (6%), N (5%), Q (3%).

A Y-DNA genetic study on Slavic peoples and some of their neighbours published two statistical distributions of distance because of the volume of details studied, based on pairwise F_{ST} values, the Turks from Bulgaria are most related to Anatolian Turks, thereafter to Italians, Bulgarians and others; while according to the R_{ST} values, the Turks from Bulgaria are most related to Bulgarians, thereafter to Macedonians, Anatolian Turks, Serbs and the rest, while Balts and North Slavs remain most unrelated according to them both. The study claims that the F_{ST} genetic distances reflect interpopulation relationships between the compared populations much better than their stepwise-based analogues, but that at the same time the genetic variation was more profoundly calculated by R_{ST}. F_{ST} and R_{ST} calculate allele (haplotype or microsatellite) frequencies among populations and the distribution of evolutionary distances among alleles. R_{ST} is based on the number of repeat differences between alleles at each microsatellite locus and is proposed to be better for most typical sample sizes, when data consist of variation at microsatellite loci or of nucleotide sequence (haplotype) information, the method may be unreliable unless a large number of loci are used. A nonsignificant test suggests that F_{ST} should be preferred or when there is high gene flow within populations, F_{ST} calculations are based on allele identity, it is likely to perform better than counterparts based on allele size information, the method depends on mutation rate, sometimes can likely provide biased estimate, but R_{ST} will not perform necessarily better. A Bulgarian and other population studies observed concluded that when there is not much differentiation, both statistical means show similar results, otherwise R_{ST} is often superior to the F_{ST}. However, no procedure has been developed to date for testing whether single-locus R_{ST} and F_{ST} estimates are significantly different.

== Summary ==
Turks settled in the territory of modern Bulgaria during and after the Ottoman conquest of the Balkans in the late 14th and early 15th centuries. Being the dominant group in the Ottoman Empire for the next five centuries, they played an important part in the economic and cultural life of the land. Waves of impoverished Turks settled fertile lands, while Bulgarian families left their strategic settlements and resettled in more remote places. According to the historian Halil Inalcik, the Ottomans ensured significant Turkish presence in forward urban outposts such as Nikopol, Kyustendil, Silistra, Trikala, Skopje and Vidin and their vicinity. Ottoman Muslims constituted the majority in and around strategic routes primarily in the southern Balkans leading from Thrace towards Macedonia and the Adriatic and again from the Maritsa and Tundzha valleys towards the Danube region.

According to the 1831 Ottoman census, the male population in the Ottoman kazas that fall within the current borders of the Republic of Bulgaria stood at 496,744 people, including 296,769 Christians (59.7%), 181,455 Muslims (36.5%), 17,474 Romani (3.5%), 702 Jews (0.1%) and 344 Armenians (0.1%). The census only covered healthy men over 15 years of age and suffered from numerous inconsistencies. Most notably, the Christian population in the kazas of Selvi (Sevlievo), Izladi (Zlatitsa), Etripolu (Etropole), Lofça (Lovech), Plevne (Pleven) and Rahova (Oryahovo) is missing as it was written in a different booklet, which was subsequently lost. The exact number of the Turkish population cannot be determined as the census followed the Ottoman millet system. Thus, "Islam Millet" or "Muslims" did not include only Turks, but all other Muslims, except Muslim Romani, who were counted separately.

After the Russo-Turkish War (1877–1878) and the establishment of the Principality of Bulgaria and the autonomous province of Eastern Rumelia, the Turkish population in the Bulgarian lands started migrating to the Ottoman Empire and then to modern Turkey. The migration peaked in 1989, when 360,000 Turks left Bulgaria as a result of the Bulgarian communist regime's assimilation campaign against them, with some 150,000 returning between 1989 and 1990.

Today, the Turks of Bulgaria are concentrated in two rural areas, in the Northeast (Ludogorie/Deliorman) and the Southeast (the Eastern Rhodopes). They form a majority in the province of Kardzhali (59.0% Turks vs. 26.5% Bulgarians) and a plurality in the province of Razgrad (47.8% Turks vs. 37.7% Bulgarians). Even though they do not constitute the majority of the population in any provincial capital, according to the census, 38.4% of Bulgarian Turks live in urban settlements and 61.6% live in villages. According to the census, 13.8% of Turks are in the age bracket 0–14 years (12.0% for ethnic Bulgarians), 66.3% in the age bracket 15-64 (63.1% for ethnic Bulgarians) and 19.8% in the age bracket 65+ (25.0% for ethnic Bulgarians). It is difficult to establish accurately the number of the Turks and that it is likely that the census numbers are an overestimate because some Pomaks, Crimean Tatars, Circassians and Romani tend to identify themselves as Turks. In Bulgaria there are also other Turkish-speaking communities such as the Gajal who could be found particularly in the Deliorman region.

According to 2002 data, the poverty rate among Bulgarian Turks is 20.9%, compared to 5.6% among ethnic Bulgarians and of 61.8% among Romani. In 2021, the share of Turks with university degree reached 8.1% (vs. 4.1% for 2011), while 35.9% (vs. 26% for 2011) had secondary education; by comparison, 29.2% and 50.5% of Bulgarians, respectively, held university degree and secondary school diplomas; the corresponding percentages for Romani are 0.8% and 14.4%. Though the majority of Bulgarians have negative feelings towards Romani, it is estimated that just 15% of Bulgarians have negative feelings against Turks, though it is unclear how much this is against the Bulgarian Turks.

== Demographics ==
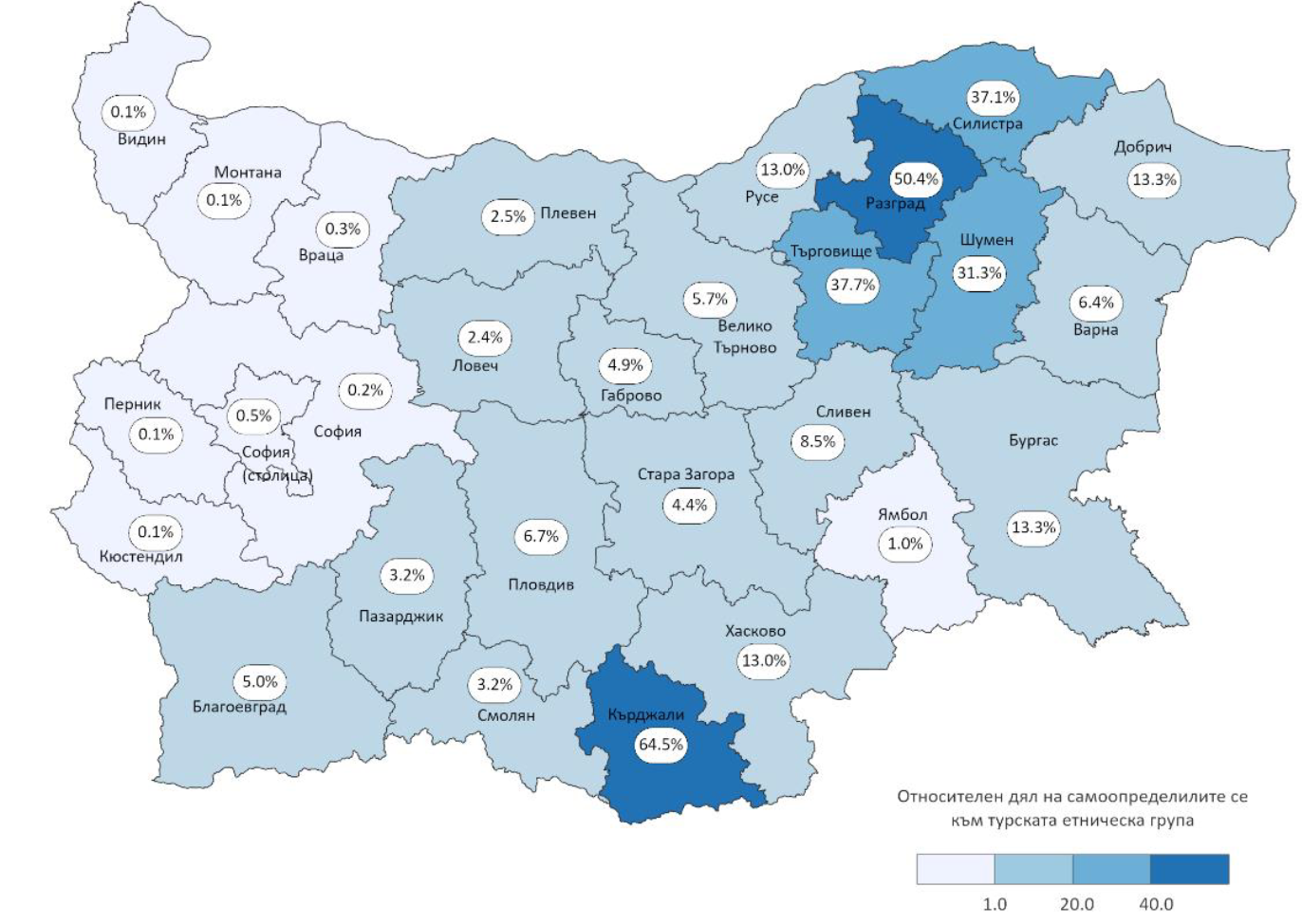
Relative share of the self-identified Turkish ethnic group according to regions as of 2021

Distribution of the Bulgarian Turks by province, according to the 2021 Bulgarian census.

Provinces	Ethnic Turks (number)	Ethnic Turks (percentage)	Total provincial population
Kardzhali	83,280	59.0%	141,177
Razgrad	49,318	47.8%	103,223
Burgas	47,286	12.4%	380,286
Shumen	44,263	29.2%	151,465
Plovdiv	39,585	6.2%	634,497
Targovishte	34,729	35.4%	98,144
Silistra	34,392	35.1%	97,770
Varna	25,678	5.9%	432,198
Haskovo	25,555	11.9%	215,565
Ruse	23,958	12.4%	193,483
Dobrich	18,835	12.5%	150,146
Blagoevgrad	14,028	4.8%	292,227
Sliven	13,217	7.7%	172,690
Stara Zagora	12,170	4.1%	296,507
Veliko Tarnovo	11,348	5.5%	207,371
Pazardzhik	6,782	3.0%	229,814
Sofia City	5,881	0.5%	1,274,290
Pleven	5,367	2.4%	226,120
Gabrovo	4,723	4.8%	98,387
Smolyan	3,049	3.2%	96,284
Lovech	2,789	2.4%	116,394
Yambol	994	0.9%	109,963
Vratsa	424	0.3%	152,813
Sofia Province	342	0.1%	231,989
Montana	136	0.1%	119,950
Pernik	128	0.1%	114,162
Vidin	65	0.1%	75,408
Kyustendil	56	0.1%	111,736
Total	508,378	7.80%	6,519,789

=== Religion ===
In the 2021 Census, 508,378 people stated that they were Turkish with 447,893 or 89.1% of Bulgarian Turks, stated that their religion was Islam, with 4,435 or 0.9% said followed Eastern Orthodox Christianity, while 13,195 or 2.6% said they had no religion and rest the 7.4% refused to answer or leave a reply according to the 2021 census.

By comparison, over 95% of the Turkish ethnic group identified as Muslim in the 2001 census and numbered 746,664. This is considered the main difference between Bulgarian Turks and the rest of the population in Bulgaria, especially the dominant Bulgarian ethnic group, 79.9% of whom declared Orthodox Christian identity in the 2021 census. In 2021, Turks formed 70.1% of the Muslim community in Bulgaria, while Bulgarians (107,777 Muslims or 16.9%) and Romani (45,817 Muslims or 7.2%) accounted for most of the remainder. In 2001, there were about 10,052 (or 1.3%) Christian Turks, but unlike the Bulgarians, they are split nearly evenly among Orthodox, Catholics, and Protestants.

Distribution of Muslims in Bulgaria

A table showing the results of the 2001 census in Bulgaria regarding religious self-identification:

Turkish population in Bulgaria by confession (2001 census)
Professing group	Adherents from the Turkish population		Adherents from the total population	
Professing group	Number	%	Number	%
Muslims	713,024	95.5	966,978	12.2
Irreligious	23,146	3.1	308,116	3.9
Orthodox Christians	5,425	0.7	6,552,751	82.6
Roman Catholic Christians	2,561	0.3	43,811	0.6
Protestant Christians	2,066	0.3	42,308	0.5
Others	442	0.1	14,937	0.2
Total population	746,664	100.0	7,928,901	100.0
Source: 2001 census:

=== Language ===
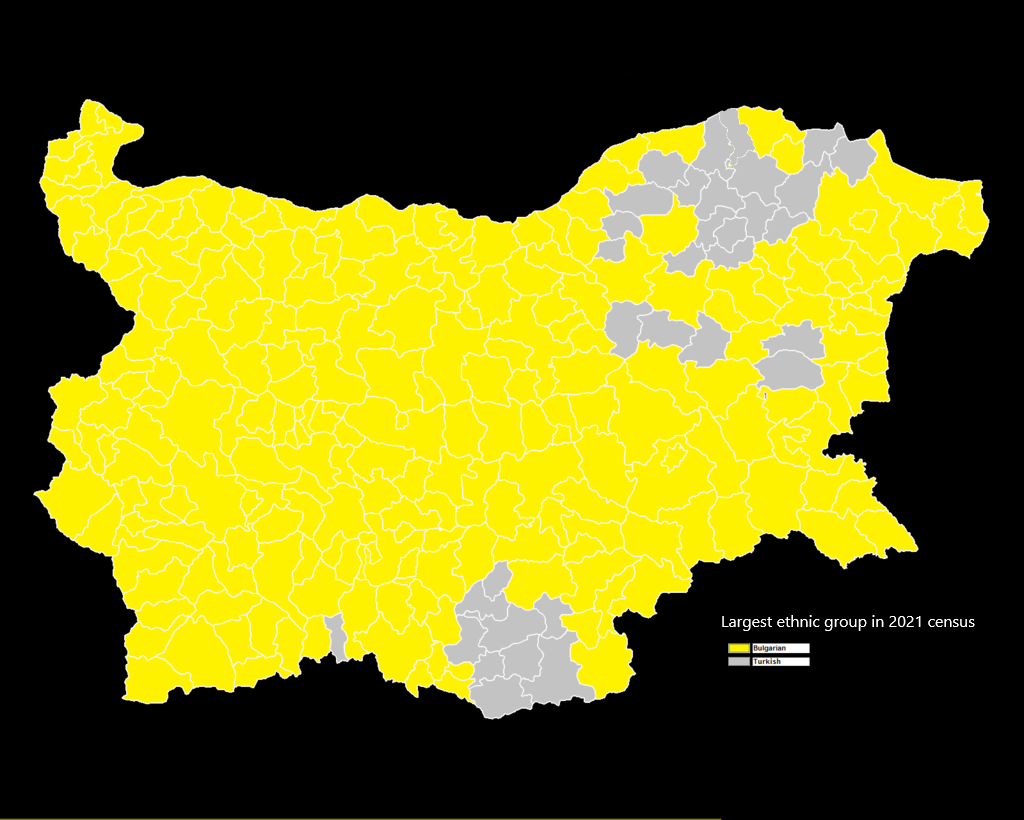
Municipalities by largest ethnic groups (2021 census)

A table showing the results of the 2001 census in Bulgaria regarding linguistic self-identification:

Turkish population in Bulgaria by mother tongue (2001 census)
Mother tongue	Speakers from the Turkish population		Speakers from the total population	
Mother tongue	Number	%	Number	%
Turkish	720,136	96.4	762,516	9.6
Bulgarian	26,147	3.5	6,697,158	84.5
Others and unspecified	381	0.1	469,227	5.9
Total population	746,664	100.0	7,928,901	100.0
Source: 2001 census:

=== Age structure ===
The Turkish population is composed of a slightly larger proportion of young people under 20 years old compared to the Bulgarian population. Despite the fact that ethnic Turks constitute only 8 percent of the total population, they form 9.7 percent of all people under 20 years old and just 5 percent among all people that are aged 60 years or over.

Population by age groups as of February 2011 by ethnic groups
Ethnic group	Total	0–9	10–19	20–29	30–39	40–49	50–59	60–69	70–79	80+
Bulgarians	5.664.624	408.927	472.704	710.717	825.784	786.593	833.007	802.613	559.323	264.956
Turks	588.318	59.719	71.901	89.602	91.343	85.903	80.054	62.534	35.454	11.808
Roma	325.343	67.568	59.511	59.442	49.572	37.723	28.411	15.833	6.031	1.252
Total	7.364.570	659.806	693.051	979.895	1.079.277	1.009.486	1.040.678	956.411	647.178	298.788

== Historical demographics ==
The exact number of Turks in Bulgaria during Ottoman rule is difficult to establish because of the millet system employed by the Ottoman authorities. Thus, Islam millet or Muslims included not only Turks, but all other Muslims, including, but not limited to, Muslim Bulgarians or Pomaks, Muslim Albanians, etc. and from the 1850s onwards also a large number of Muslim Muhacir, including Crimean Tatars, Circassians, Nogais, etc., expelled by the Russian Empire in the 1850s and 1860s, especially as a result of the Circassian genocide. Muslim Romani were counted towards Islam millet only sporadically and usually formed a category of their own.

=== 1831 Ottoman census ===
According to the 1831 Ottoman census, the male population in the Ottoman kazas that fall within the current borders of the Republic of Bulgaria stood at 496,744 people, including 296,769 Christians, 181,455 Muslims, 17,474 Romani, 702 Jews and 344 Armenians. The census only covered healthy taxable men between 15 and 60 years of age, who were free from disability.

Millets in present-day Bulgaria as per 1831 Ottoman Census
1. Rayah (59.7%)
2. Islam millet (36.5%)
3. Gypsies (3.50%)
4. Jews (0.10%)
5. Armenians (0.10%)

1831 Ottoman census (healthy taxable men over 15 only):
Millet	Republic of Bulgaria borders	
Millet	Healthy taxable men aged 15–60 years^{2}	%
Islam millet/Muslims	181,455	36.5%
Rayah/Orthodox Christians^{1}	296,769	59.7%
Gypsies/Romani	17,474	3.5%
Jews	702	0.1%
Armenians	344	0.1%
Total	496,744	100.0%
^{1}No data about the Christian population of the kazas of Selvi (Sevlievo), Izladi (Zlatitsa), Etripolu (Etropole), Lofça (Lovech), Plevne (Pleven), Rahova (Oryahovo) as well as Tirnova (Veliko Tarnovo) and its three constitunet nahiyas.^{2}For figures comparable with post-1878 data, Arkadiev has suggested using the formula N=2 x (Y x 2.02), where 1831 census figures are multiplied by 2.02 to compute total male population and then by 2 to generate total male and female population. This gives total population of 2,006,845, of whom 1,198,946 Orthodox Christians, 733,078 Muslims, 70,595 Romani, 2,836 Jews and 1,390 Armenians

By using primary population records from the Danube Vilayet, Bulgarian statistician Dimitar Arkadiev has found that men aged 15–60 represented, on average, 49.5% of all males and that the coefficient that would permit calculating the entire male population is therefore 2.02. To compute total population, male figures are then usually doubled. Using this method of computation, (N=2 x (Y x 2.02)), the population of present-day Bulgaria in 1831 stood at 2,006,845 people, of whom 1,198,946 Orthodox Christians (undercounted because of the missing data), 733,078 Muslims, 70,595 Romani, 2,836 Jews and 1,390 Armenians. However, assuming that 20-40 % of men aged 15–60 were either infirm or untaxable for another reason, as suggested by Ottomanist Nikolai Todorov, the figures may be well undercounted and should never be assumed to be fully reliable as data.

=== Ottoman population records (1860–1875) for the future Principality of Bulgaria ===
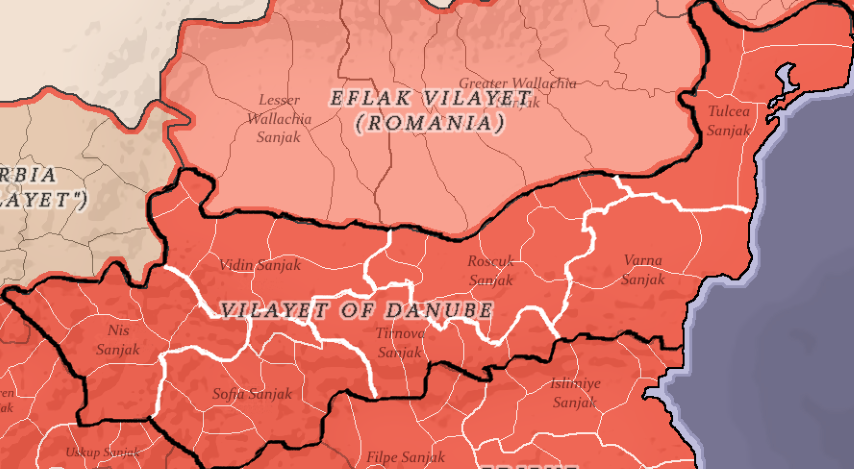
Danube (Tuna) Vilayet with borders of its constituent sanjaks

The Principality of Bulgaria was establislished on 13 July 1878 from five of the sanjaks that used to be part of the Ottoman Danube Vilayet prior to the Russo-Turkish War of 1877-78: the Sanjaks of Vidin, Tirnova, Rusçuk, Sofya and Varna, with individual border changes, cf. below. The two other sanjaks in the Danube Vilayet, those of Niš and Tulça, were ceded to Serbia and Romania, respectively.

According to the Ottoman almanac for 1859-1860, the male Muslim population (incl. Muslim Romani) of the five Danubian sanjaks to form the future Principality of Bulgaria stood at 255,372 vs. a male non-Muslim population (incl. Christian Romani) of 418,682. This gave a Muslim-to-non-Muslim ratio of 37.9% to 62.1%.

The 1859-1860 figures are important as a benchmark as they were the last Ottoman records to not take into account the settlement of more than 300,000 Crimean Tatars and Circassians in the Danube Vilayet from 1855 until 1865. This settlement took place in two waves: one of 142,852 Tatars and Nogais, with a minority of Circassians, who were settled in the Danube Vilayet between 1855 and 1862, and a second one of some 35,000 Circassian families, who were settled in 1864.

According to Turkish scholar Kemal Karpat, the Tatar and Circassian colonisation of the vilayet not only offset the heavy Muslim population losses earlier in the century, but also counteracted continued population loss and led to an increase in its Muslim population. In this connection, Karpat also refers to the material differences between Muslim and non-Muslim fertility rates, with non-Muslims growing at the rate of 2% per annum and Muslims usually averaging 0%.

The Ottoman almanac for 1875 indicates male Muslim population of the five Bulgarian sanjaks of the Danube Vilayet—Rusçuk, Vidin, Sofia, Tirnova and Varna—of 405,450 vs. a male non-Muslim population of 628,049. This gave a somewhat more beneficial Muslim-to-non-Muslim ratio of 39.2% to 60.8%.

Muslims vs. Non-Muslims in the "five Bulgarian sanjaks" in 1860 & 1875
Community	1860 Ottoman salname		1875 Ottoman salname	
Community	Male population^{3}	%	Male population^{3}	%
Islam millet/Muslims	255,372^{1}	37.9%	405,450^{2}	39.2%
Non-Muslims	418,682	62.1%	628,049	60.8%
Total	674,054	100%	1,033,499	100%
^{1}Includes 238,033 Muslims (35.3%) and 17,339 Muslim Romani (2.8%)^{2}Includes 353,135 "Established Muslims" (34.2%), 27,589 Circassian Muhacir (2.7%) and 24,696 Muslim Romani (2.4%)^{3}Presuming an equal number of men and women, as suggested by Ubicini and Palairet, the total population for 1860 is 1,348,499 people, divided into 510,744 Muslims and 810,900 Non-Muslims, whereas the total population for 1875 is 2,066,998, divided into 810,900 Muslims and 1,256,098 Non-Muslims.

To better illustrate the impact Caucasian and Crimean Muhacir had on the Danube Vilayet's demography, it would be helpful to also incorporate the data for the Sanjak of Tulça. This was the primary Ottoman destination for Crimean Tatar refugees in the 1850s and 1860s, to the extent they held a plurality in the sanjak's population by 1878 (31.5%), and the region was affectionately nicknamed Küçük Tataristan (Little Tartary):

Muslims vs. Non-Muslims in the "five Bulgarian sanjaks" & Sanjak of Tulça in 1860 & 1875
Community	1860 Ottoman salname		1875 Ottoman salname	
Community	Male population^{3}	%	Male population^{3}	%
Islam millet/Muslims	261,522^{1}	37.8%	461,602^{2}	41.1%
Non-Muslims	430,065	62.2%	659,352	58.9%
Total	691,587	100%	1,120,954	100%
^{1}Includes 238,033 Muslims (35.3%) and 17,339 Muslim Romani (2.8%)^{2}Includes 353,135 "Established Muslims" (34.2%), 27,589 Circassian Muhacir (2.7%) and 24,696 Muslim Romani (2.4%)^{3}Presuming an equal number of men and women, as suggested by Ubicini and Palairet, the total population for 1860 is 1,383,174 people, divided into 523,104 Muslims and 860,130 Non-Muslims, whereas the total population for 1875 is 2,241,908, divided into 923,204 and 1,318,704 Non-Muslims.

The data for 1875 is also available as a breakdown by various ethno-confessional groups. While Non-Muslims here are separated into a number of different categories, Islam millet or "Muslims" covered a wider range of ethnicies (apart from Romani and more recent Circassian refugees). In addition to the dominant Turkish ethnic group, in the 1870s, it was estimated to also include some 10,000 Pomaks or Muslim Bulgarians, living mostly in the region of Lovech.

Ethnoconfessional Groups in the "five Bulgarian sanjaks" as per the 1873-74 Census
1. Bulgarians (57.6%)
2. Establ. Muslims (34.2%)
3. Çerkes Muhacir (2.70%)
4. Muslim Romani (2.39%)
5. Misc. Christians (1.47%)
6. Christian Romani (0.68%)
7. Greeks (0.38%)
8. Jews (0.44%)
9. Armenians (0.17%)

Ethnoconfessional groups in the "five Bulgarian sanjaks" according to the 1875 Ottoman salname (males only):
Community	Rusçuk Sanjak	Vidin Sanjak	Varna Sanjak	Tırnova Sanjak	Sofya Sanjak	Principality of Bulgaria
Islam Millet	164,455 (53%)	20,492 (11%)	52,742 (61%)	88,445 (36%)	27,001 (13%)	353,135 (34%)
Circassian Muhacir	16,588 (5%)	6,522 (4%)	4,307 (5%)	0 (0%)	202 (0%)	27,589 (3%)
Muslim Roma	9,579 (3%)	2,783 (2%)	2,825 (3%)	6,545 (3%)	2,964 (1%)	24,696 (2%)
Bulgar Millet	114,792 (37%)	131,279 (73%)	21,261 (25%)	148,713 (60%)	179,202 (84%)	595,247 (58%)
Vlachs, (Note: The term "Vlachs" may refer to either the Aromanians, the Megleno-Romanians, the Romanians, two of the three or all of them at the same time. It is a term originally used by foreign peoples for the Eastern Romance peoples (which also include the Istro-Romanians, who never lived under the Ottoman Empire), although some of them have internalized it as a self-designation.) Catholics, etc.	500 (0%)	14,690 (8%)	0 (0%)	0 (0%)	0 (0%)	15,190 (1%)
Rum Millet (Greeks)	0 (0%)	0 (0%)	3,421 (4%)	494 (0%)	0 (0%)	3,915 (0%)
Non-Muslim Roma	1,790 (1%)	2,048 (1%)	331 (0%)	1,697 (1%)	1,437 (1%)	7,303 (1%)
Ermeni Millet	991 (0%)	0 (0%)	808 (1%)	0 (0%)	0 (0%)	1,799 (0%)
Yahudi Millet	1,102 (0%)	1,009 (1%)	110 (0%)	0 (0%)	2,374 (1%)	4,595 (0%)
Total	309,797 (100%)	178,823 (100%)	85,805 (100%)	245,894 (100%)	213,180 (100%)	1,033,499 (100%)

The Congress of Berlin ceded the kaza of Cuma-i Bâlâ from the Sanjak of Sofia (male Muslim population of 2,755) to the Ottoman Empire and the kaza of Mankalya from the Sanjak of Varna (male Muslim population of 6,675) to Romania and attached the kaza of Iznebol (male Muslim population of 149) from the Sanjak of Niš to the Principality of Bulgaria.

Thus, the total male Muslim population in the future Principality of Bulgaria prior to the Russo-Turkish War of 1877–1878 consisted of 333,705 Turks, 10,000 Muslim Bulgarians or Pomaks, 24,696 Muslim Romani Romani and 27,589 Circassian Muhacir.

Aggregated for males and females, the Muslim population of the future Principality of Bulgaria therefore consisted of 668,410 Turks, 20,000 Pomaks, 49,392 Muslim Romani and 55,178 Circassian Muhacir, or of a total of 792,980 Muslims.

==== Counting of Crimean and Caucasian Muhacir ====
The data in the 1875 Ottoman salname comes from a vilayet-wide census completed in September 1874. A flash summary of results published in the Danube Official Gazette on 18 October 1874 (cumulative data only, no sanjak-by-sanjak breakdown) gave twice as many male Circassian Muhacir, 64,398 vs. 30,573, and slightly fewer "established Muslims" than the final results published in 1875. According to Koyuncu, 13,825 male Circassians were carried over to the "established Muslims" column and further 20,000 were simply left out or lost in the carry-over.

Ethnoconfessional Groups in the Danube Vilayet as per the 1873-74 Census
1. Bulgarians (51.9%)
2. Establ. Muslims (34.4%)
3. Çerkes Muhacir (5.64%)
4. Misc. Christians (3.53%)
5. Muslim Romani (2.19%)
6. Christian Romani (0.68%)
7. Greeks (0.67%)
8. Jews (0.47%)
9. Roman Catholics (0.31%)
10. Armenians (0.19%)

Flash summary of the 1873-1874 Danube Vilayet^{1} census (males only)
Population	Round I (1873)	Round II (1874)	Total	Percentage
Muslims	278,378	203,420	481,798	42.22%
—Established Muslims	232,848	159,521	392,369	34.39%
—Muhacir	30,573	33,825	64,398	5.64%
—Muslim Romani	14,957	10,074	25,031	2.19%
Christians	314,169	339,709	663,878	57.31%
—Bulgar millet	275,604	316,969	592,573	51.93%
—Rum millet	3,523	4,132	7,655	0.67%
—Ermeni millet	2,125	3	2,128	0.19%
—Roman Catholics	3,556	-	3,556	0.31%
—Miscellaneous	24,791	15,512	40,303	3.53%
—Christian Romani	4,570	3,093	7,663	0.67%
Yahudi millet	5,192	183	5,375	0.47%
Total population	597,739	543,312	1,141,051	100%
^{1}Only covers the "five Bulgarian sanjaks", i.e., the Sanjaks of Vidin, Tirnova, Rusçuk, Varna, Sofya, along with the Sanjak of Tulça, but not the Sanjak of Niš, which by then had been ceded to the Prizren Vilayet. No sanjak-by-sanjak breakown available.

While the 1875 Ottoman salname is the first one to count Circassians separately, no Ottoman population record even mentions Crimean Tatars, causing speculation as to whether they were counted and how. For example, French diplomat Aubaret assumes that neither Circassians, nor Tatars were included in the Ottoman records and just adds 310,000 Muhacir to the rest of the numbers in his estimates. Contemporary European geographers, e.g. German-English Ravenstein, French Bianconi and German Kiepert, on the other hand, indicate that Tatars are counted together with Turks in Islam millet.

Kemal Karpat claims that Crimean Tatars and Circassians were not counted in the Ottoman salnames and that the overall number of Muslims is therefore underestimated. However, later on in the same book, he breaks down Northern Dobruja's 126,924 Muslims in 1878 into 48,783 Turks, 71,146 Crimean Tatars and 6,994 Circassians. Given that there were 53,059 "established Muslims" and 2,954 Circassians in the Tulça sanjak in 1875 and 6,675 additional Muslims in the kaza of Mankalya in 1873, that these numbers only refer to males and that recalculating them to include females would more than double them to approx. 125,000, it is indisputable that Crimean Tatars were not only counted, but counted as established Muslims.

According to Koyuncu, the division of Muslims into "established" and "Muhacir" in the census and the 1875 Ottoman salname was entirely tax-based rather than origin-based. Thus, Muslim colonists whose 10-year tax exemption had expired and were liable to taxation at the time of the census (Crimean Tatars, Nogais, etc., with a minority of Circassians) were counted as "established", while colonists who still benefited from the exemption (Circassians) were counted as "Muhacir".

In this connection, Koyuncu notes the tremendous rate of increase in the Muslim population of the five Bulgarian sanjaks and Tulça of 84.23% (220,276 males) vs. 53.29% (229,188 males) for Non-Muslims from 1860 to 1875 despite the higher natural rate of increase in Non-Muslims and attributes it to the settlement of Crimean Tatars and Circassians in the province.

Muslims in the future Principality of Bulgaria by ethnicity, ca. 1875
1. Turks (65.8%)
2. Muslim Romani (5.90%)
3. Muslim Bulgarians (2.40%)
4. Crimean and Caucasian Muhacir (25.9%)

Unlike the Circassian colonisation in 1864 and later years, the settlement of Crimean Tatars, Nogais, etc. in 1855-1862 has been documented minutely. Out of a total of 34,344 households with 142,852 members (or 4.16 members per household on average) settled along the Danube, a total of 22,360 households with some 93,000 members were given land in kazas that became part of the Principality of Bulgaria.

Muhacir households settled in the future Principality of Bulgaria by kaza until 1861:
Kaza	Number of households settled
Kula	1,250
Belogradchik	110
Lom	1,500
Oryahovo	2,500
Berkovitsa	700
Vratsa	600
Pleven	600
Lovech	700
Nikopol	1,500
Svishtov	1,200
Ruse	500
Shumen	1,500
Silistra	1,500
Razgrad & Targovishte	700
Provadiya	1,000
Varna	2,000
Dobrich	1,500
Balchik	1,500
Sofia	1,500
Total	22,360

Adjusted for the Circassians who were carried over to "established Muslims" or left out of the Salname in 1874 (male-female-aggregated figures of 27,650 and 40,000) and the Crimean Tatar, Nogai and Circassian refugees settled until 1861 (93,000), the male-female-aggregated Muslim population of the future Principality of Bulgaria in 1875 consisted of 547,760 Turks (65.8%), up to 215,828 Crimean and Caucasian Muhacir (25.9%), 49,392 Muslim Romani (5.9%) and 20,000 Muslim Bulgarians (2.4%), or a total of up to 832,980 Muslims.

The male-female-aggregated number of Crimean Tatar, Circassian, etc. colonists in territories which the 1878 Congress of Berlin ceded to the Principality of Bulgaria and the Principality of Romania (215,828 and 71,146+6,994) stands at 293,968, a number that is consistent with Kemal Karpat's estimate of 200,000–300,000 Muhacir, Turkish historian Nedim İpek's estimate of 300,000 Muhacir, Bulgarian Ottomanist Muchinov's estimate of 350,000–400,000 Muhacir, Ottoman statesman and Danube Vilayet Governor, Midhat Pasha's 1866 estimate of 350,000 Muhacir and the Bulgarian edition of the Danube Official Gazette's 1867 estimate of 300,000 Muhacir settled in the Danube Vilayet.

==== Foreign estimates for the pre-war population of the Danube Vilayet ====
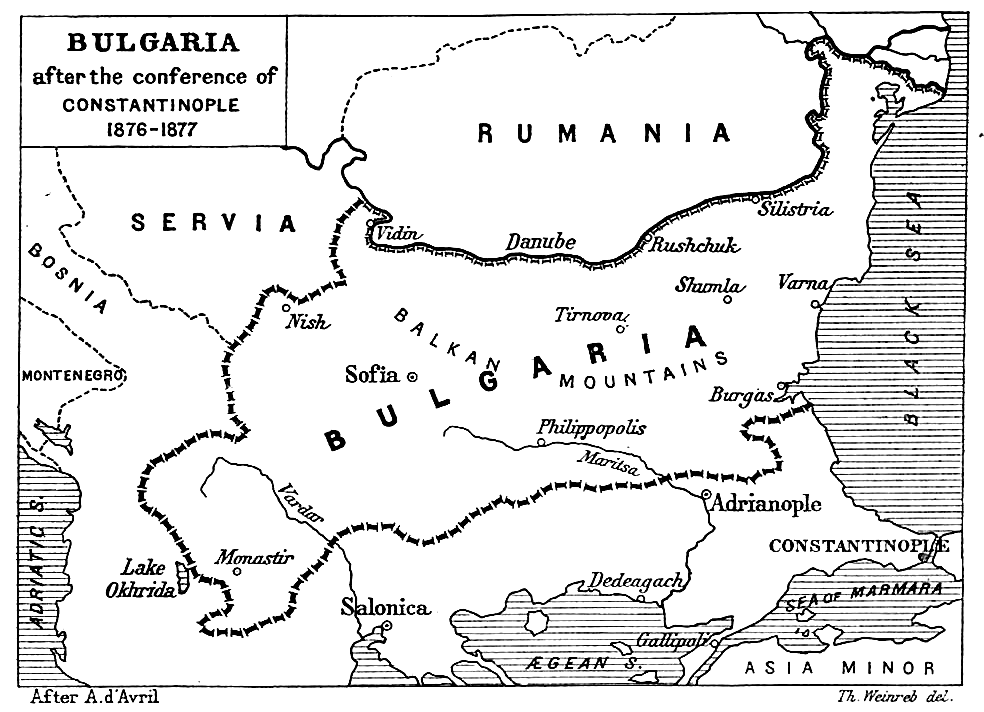
Bulgaria according to the Constantinople Conference

The extreme brutality accompanying the suppression of the Bulgarian April Uprising of 1876 and the numerous atrocities committed, in particular, by irregular Ottoman paramilitaries (primarily Circassian bashi-bazouk) caused massive outrage across Europe and especially in the United Kingdom, the hitherto closest Ottoman ally. The disproportionate use of brute force against not only insurgents but also non-combatants, dubbed in the European press as The Bulgarian Horrors and The Crime of the Century caused the Great Powers to convene the Conference of Constantinople in December 1876 in order to seek a solution to the Bulgarian Problem.

A number of estimates for the population of the Danube Vilayet were prepared by most Great Powers in conjunction with the Conference. Authors include Gabriel Aubaret, French Consul-General in Rusçuk; Ottoman army officer Stanislas Saint Clair; French scholars and orientalists Ubicini and Courteille; Englishman W.N. Jocelyn, Secretary of the British Embassy in Constantinople; Greek official Stavrides, translator at the British Embassy in Constantinople; Russian diplomat Vladimir Cherkassky and Russian diplomat Vladimir Teplov. The estimates can be found in a tabular form below:

1876 foreign estimates about the Turkish/Muslim population of the Danube Vilayet
Author	Country	Ethnoconfessional group	Principality of Bulgaria^{1}		Principality of Bulgaria+Tulça^{2}		Danube Vilayet	
Author	Country	Ethnoconfessional group	Number	%	Number	%	Number	%
Gabriel Aubaret	France	Turks			740,000	32.89%		
Stanislas Saint Clair	Ottoman Empire	Turks					457,108^{3}	35.86%
Ubicini & Courteille	France	Muslims					1,055,650	40.74%
W.N. Jocelyn	United Kingdom	Muslims	710,418	38.69%			911,536	38.91%
Stavrides	United Kingdom	Muslims	812,980	39.93%			957,600	40.22%
Vladimir Cherkassky	Russian Empire	Muslims	810,542	39.60%			1,000,342	38.73%
Vladimir Teplov	Russian Empire	Muslims	499,156	25.91%			674,672	26.16%
^{1}Refers to the Sanjaks of Vidin, Tirnova, Rusçuk, Varna and Sofya which were merged into the Principality of Bulgaria in 1878.^{2}Refers to the five sanjaks to form the Principality of Bulgaria and the Sanjak of Tulça, which was eventually ceded to Romania along with the Kaza of Mankalya and is currently known as Northern Dobruja.^{3}Data refers to males only.

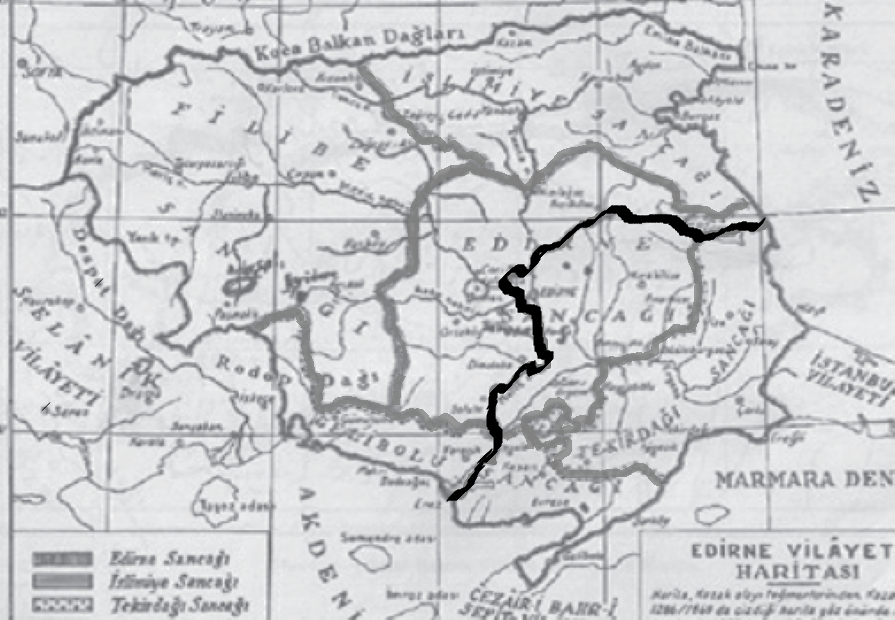
1869 map of the Edirne Vilayet & sanjaks, with superimposed borders of Modern Turkey

Except for Saint Clare, whose estimates were based on the Ottoman teskere, all other estimates are based on the Ottoman salnames (i.e., the annual Ottoman almanacs). The figures were used as underlying data at the 1876-77 Constantinople Conference, which eventually came up with the proposal for the establishment of two autonomous Bulgarian vilayets that remained under Ottoman control, but subject to extensive oversight by all Great Powers. For a discussion of the figures and their accuracy, see Koyuncu.

=== Ottoman population records (1876) for the future Eastern Rumelia ===
The other Bulgarian territory to be carved out of the Ottoman Empire was the autonomous province of Eastern Rumelia. It incorporated the Sanjak of Filibe (minus the Ahi Çelebi/Smolyan and Sultanyeri/Momchilgrad kazas, which were ceded back to the Ottoman Empire), the Sanjak of İslimye and the kaza of Kızılağaç/Elhovo and nahiya of Manastir/Topolovgrad from the Sanjak of Edirne, along with smaller parts of the nahiyas of Üsküdar and Çöke, again from the Sanjak of Edirne.

Population data from the Ottoman records for 1876 follows below (males only):

Ethnoconfessional Groups per Kaza in the Future Eastern Rumelia in 1876 Based on the 1875 Adrianople Vilayet Census
Kaza (District)	Islam millet (Muslims)	%	Bulgar & Rum millet	%	Armenian millet	%	Catholics (Paulicians)	%	Yahudi millet	%	Romani (Muslim)	%	Romani (Christian)	%	Total	%
Filibe/Plovdiv	35,400	28.1	80,165	63.6	380	0.3	3,462	2.7	691	0.5	5,174	4.1	495	0.4	125,947	100.00
Pazarcık/Pazardzhik	10,805	22.8	33,395	70.5	94	0.2	-	0.0	344	0.7	2,120	4.5	579	1.2	47,337	100.00
Hasköy/Haskovo	33,323	55.0	25,503	42.1	3	0.0	-	0.0	65	0.1	1,548	2.6	145	0.2	60,587	100.00
Zağra-i Atik/Stara Zagora	6,677	20.0	24,857	74.5	-	0.0	-	0.0	740	2.2	989	3.0	90	0.3	33,353	100.00
Kızanlık/Kazanlak	14,365	46.5	14,906	48.2	-	0.0	-	0.0	219	0.7	1,384	4.5	24	0.0	30,898	100.00
Çırpan/Chirpan	5,158	23.9	15,959	73.8	-	0.0	-	0.0	-	0.0	420	1.9	88	0.4	21,625	100.00
~~Ahi Çelebi/Smolyan~~^{1}	~~8,197~~	~~57.8~~	~~5,346~~	~~37.7~~	~~268~~	~~1.9~~	-	~~0.0~~	-	~~0.0~~	~~377~~	~~2.7~~	-	~~0.0~~	~~14,188~~	~~100.00~~
~~Sultanyeri/Momchilgrad~~^{1}	~~13,336~~	~~96.9~~	~~262~~	~~1.9~~	-	~~0.0~~	-	0.0	-	0.0	~~159~~	1.2	-	0.0	~~13,757~~	~~100.00~~
Filibe sanjak subtotal	104,700	32.7	194,785	60.9	477	0.2	3,642	1.1	2,059	0.6	11,635	3.6	1,421	0.4	319,747	100.00
İslimye/Sliven	8,392	29.8	17,975	63.8	143	0.5	-	0.0	158	0.6	596	2.1	914	3.2	28,178	100.00
Yanbolu/Yambol	4,084	30.4	8,107	60.4	-	0.0	-	0.0	396	3.0	459	3.4	377	3.2	13,423	100.00
Misivri/Nesebar	2,182	40.0	3,118	51.6	-	0.0	-	0.0	-	0.0	153	2.8	-	0.0	5,453	100.00
Karinâbâd/Karnobat	7,656	60.5	3,938	31.1	-	0.0	-	0.0	250	2.0	684	5.4	125	1.0	12,653	100.00
Aydos/Aytos	10,858	76.0	2,735	19.2	19	0.1	-	0.0	36	0.2	584	4.1	46	0.3	14,278	100.00
Zağra-i Cedid/Nova Zagora	5,310	29.4	11,777	65.2	-	0.0	-	0.0	-	0.0	880	4.9	103	0.6	18,070	100.00
Ahyolu/Pomorie	1,772	33.7	3,113	59.2	-	0.0	-	0.0	-	0.0	378	7.2	2	0.0	5,265	100.00
Burgas	4,262	22.1	14,179	73.6	46	0.2	-	0.0	4	0.0	448	2.3	320	1.6	19,259	100.00
Islimiye sanjak subtotal	44,516	38.2	64,942	55.7	208	0.2	-	0.0	844	0.6	4,182	3.6	1,887	1.6	116,579	100.00
Kızılağaç/Elhovo^{2}	1,425	9.6	11,489	89.0	N/A	N/A	N/A	N/A	N/A	N/A	N/A	N/A	N/A	N/A	12,914	100.00
Manastir/Topolovgrad^{2}	409	1.5	26,139	98.5	N/A	N/A	N/A	N/A	N/A	N/A	N/A	N/A	N/A	N/A	26,548	100.00
Eastern Rumelia Total Male Population	150,870	31.7	297,764	62.7	685	0.1	3,642	0.8	2,903	0.6	15,817	3.3	3,308	0.7	475,617	100.00
Eastern Rumelia GRAND TOTAL^{3}	301,740	31.7	595,528	62.7	1,370	0.1	7,284	0.8	5,806	0.6	31,634	3.3	6,616	0.7	915,234	100.00
^{1}Kaza to remain in the Ottoman Empire.^{2}Figures available for Islam millet and Bulgar millet/Rum millet only.^{3} Male/female aggregated figures presuming equal number of men and women, as suggested by Ubicini and Palairet.

Muslims in the future Eastern Rumelia by ethnicity, c. 1876
1. Turks (77.0%)
2. Muslim Romani (9.50%)
3. Muslim Bulgarians (7.50%)
4. Crimean and Caucasian Muhacir (6.00%)

According to British diplomat Drummond-Wolff, Islam millet included 25,000 Muslim Bulgarians, 10,000 Tatars and Nogays and 10,000 Circassians. Koyuncu lists between 11,000 and 20,000 Tatars and Circassians, while Mehmet Çetinkaya claims that some 6,000 Circassian families were split between the Sanjak of Edirne and Sanjak of İslimye.

Thus, the male-female aggregated population of Eastern Rumelia prior to the Russo-Turkish War consisted of 595,528 Orthodox Bulgarians and Greeks (62.6%), 7,284 Catholic Bulgarians (0.8%), 6,616 Orthodox Romani (0.7%), 1,370 Armenians (0.1%) and 5,806 Jews (0.6%) as well as of 256,740 Turks (27.0%), 25,000 Muslim Bulgarians (2.6%), 20,000 Muhacir (2.1%), 31,634 Muslim Romani (3.3%), or altogether 333,374 Muslims (35.0%).

==== Foreign estimates for the pre-war population of Eastern Rumelia/the Adrianople Vilayet ====
According to Turkish Ottomanist Kemal Karpat, the total population of the Adrianople Vilayet in 1877 stood at 1,304,352 people, of whom 526,691 were Bulgar millet (40.38%) and 503,058 were Muslims (38.57%). In 1877-1878, the vilayet consisted of the sanjaks of Filibe, İslimye, Edirne, Gelibolu (Gallipoli) and Tekfürtağ (Rodosto) and largely overlapped with the historical and geographical region of Thrace.

According to French orientalist Ubicini, based on the official Ottoman Census of the Adrianople Vilayet in 1875, the total population of the vilayet stood at 1,594,185 people, of whom 557,692 (34.98%) were Muslims, 45,418 (2.84%) were Muslim Romani, 937, 054 (58.78%) were Bulgarians and Greeks, 16,432 (1.03%) were Jews, 16,194 (1.02%) were Armenians, 12,144 (0.76%) were Roman Catholics and 9,252 (0.58%) were Christian Romani. The extent of the vilayet and the constituent sanjaks were the same, as reported by Karpat.

According to British Historian R.J. Moore, the male population of the Filibe Sanjak in 1876 (kazas of Ahi Çelebi and Sultanyeri included) comprised 127,260 Turks (37%) and 12,471 Muslim Romani (4%), while the male Muslim population of the İslimye Sanjak in 1875 stood at 44,747 people and accounted for 42% of the total population.

British diplomat Drummond-Wolff (Drummond-Wolff to Salisbury, 26.09.1878) estimated in 1878 that the total population of Eastern Rumelia in 1875 had comprised 220,000 Turks (29%), 25,000 Pomaks (3%), 10,000 Crimean Tatar Muhacir (1%), 10,000 Circassian Muhacir (1%) and 25,000 Muslim Romani (3%) out of a total population of 760,000 people.

=== Post 1878 ===
The flow of Turks to Anatolia continued in a steady pattern depending on the policies of the ruling regimes until 1925 after which immigration was regulated. During the 20th century Bulgaria also practiced forced deportations and expulsions, which also targeted the Muslim Pomak population.

The biggest wave of Turkish emigration occurred in 1989, when 360,000 left Bulgaria as a result of the communist Todor Zhivkov regime's assimilation campaign, but around 150,000 returned between 1989 and 1990. That program, which began in 1984, forced all Turks and other Muslims in Bulgaria to adopt Christian names and renounce all Muslim customs. The motivation of the 1984 assimilation campaign was unclear; however, many experts believed that the disproportion between the birth rates of the Turks and the Bulgarians was a major factor. The official government claim was that the Turks in Bulgaria were really Bulgarians who were Turkified, and that they voluntarily chose to change their Turkish/Muslim names to Bulgarian/Slavic ones. During this period the Bulgarian authorities denied all reports of ethnic repression and that ethnic Turks existed in the country. During the name-changing phase of the campaign, Turkish towns and villages were surrounded by army units. Citizens were issued new identity cards with Bulgarian names. Failure to present a new card meant forfeiture of salary, pension payments, and bank withdrawals. Birth or marriage certificates would be issued only in Bulgarian names. Traditional Turkish costumes were banned; homes were searched and all signs of Turkish identity removed. Mosques were closed or demolished. Turkish names on gravestones were replaced with Bulgarian names. According to estimates reported by the Federal Research Division of the US Library of Congress, 500 to 1,500 people were killed when they resisted assimilation measures, and thousands of others were sent to labor camps or were forcibly resettled.

The fall of communism in Bulgaria led to a reversal of the state's policy towards its citizens of Turkish descent. After the fall of Zhivkov in 1989, the National Assembly of Bulgaria passed laws to restore the cultural rights of the Turkish population. In 1991 a new law gave anyone affected by the name-changing campaign three years to officially restore original names and the names of children born after the name change. In January 1991, Turkish-language lessons were reintroduced as a non-compulsory subject for four hours per week if requested. According to the 2011 census in Bulgaria, there are 588,318 persons from the Turkish ethnic group or 8.8% of all ethnic groups, of whom 564,858 pointed Turkish as their mother tongue. Statistic results of the Address Based Population Registration System on the foreign-born population residing in Turkey from 2014 showed that 37.6% of a total of 992,597 foreign-born residents were born in Bulgaria, thus forming the largest foreign-born group in the country. The number of Bulgarian citizens from Turkish descent residing in Turkey is put at 326,000, during the 2005 Bulgarian parliamentary elections 120,000 voted either in Bulgaria or polling stations set up in Turkey.

Year	Turks	Native Turkish speakers	Turks/others	Bulgaria's population
1878			466,000 (26%)	
1880		527,284 (26.3%)		2,007,919
1880^{1}	174,700 (21.4%)			815,951
1885^{1}	200,489 (20.6%)			975,030
1887^{2, 3}		607,331 (19.3%)		3,154,375
1892^{2}		569,728 (17.2%)		3,310,713
1900^{4}	531,240 (14.2%)	539,656		3,744,283
1905	488,010 (12.1%)	514,658		4,035,575
1910	465,641 (10.7%)	504,681		4,337,513
1920	520,339 (10.7%)	542,904		4,846,971
1926	577,552 (10.5%)	607,763		5,478,741
1934	591,193 (9.7%)	618,268		6,077,939
1946	675,500 (9.6%)			7,029,349
1956	656,025 (8.6%)			7,613,709
1965	780,928 (9.5%)			8,227,966
1975	730,728 (8.4%)			8,727,771
1992	800,052 (9.4%)	813,639		8,487,317
2001	746,664 (9.4%)	762,516		7,928,901
2011	588,318 (8.0%)	605 802		7,364,570
^{1} Data refers to the autonomous province of Eastern Rumelia.^{2} Data for the 1887 census and all subsequent censuses refers to the Principality of Bulgaria and Eastern Rumelia combined following their Unification in 1885.^{3} Data for the 1887 and 1892 census is borrowed from historian R.J. Crampton's Bulgaria.^{4} Data for the census of 1900 and all subsequent censuses is borrowed from the website of the National Statistical Institute.

Dominant ethnic groups by cadastral division according to the 2011 census

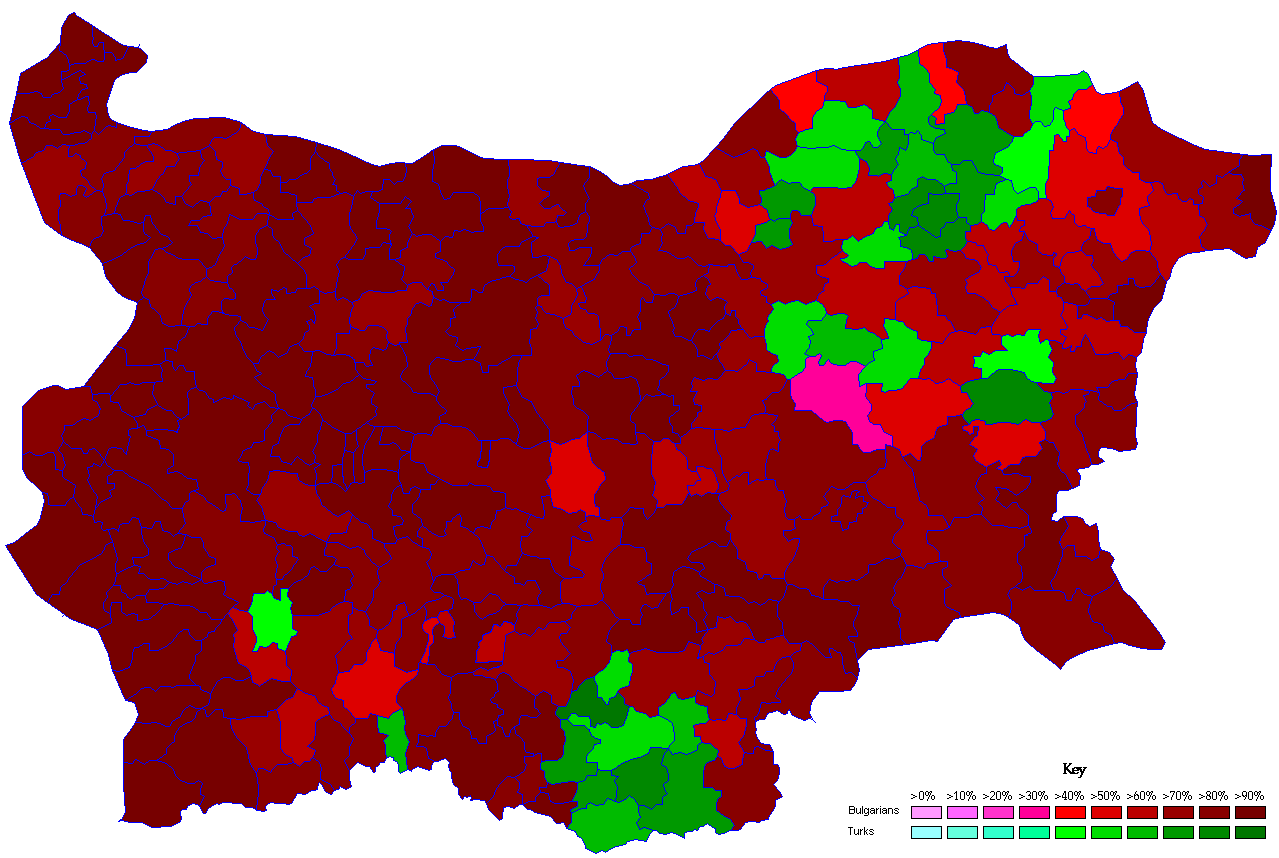
Dominant ethnic groups by municipalities according to the 2011 census

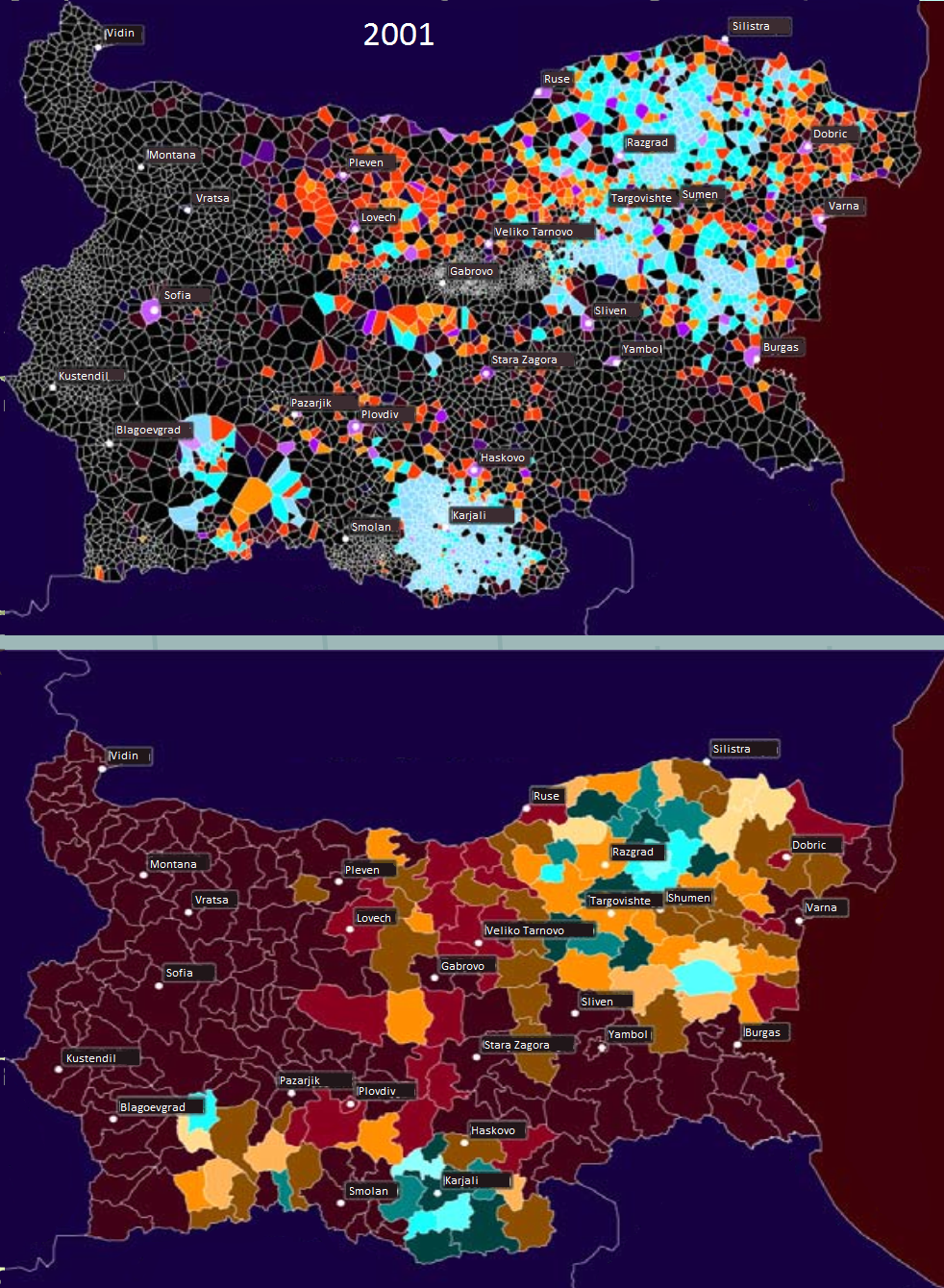
Distribution of Turks according to the 2001 census

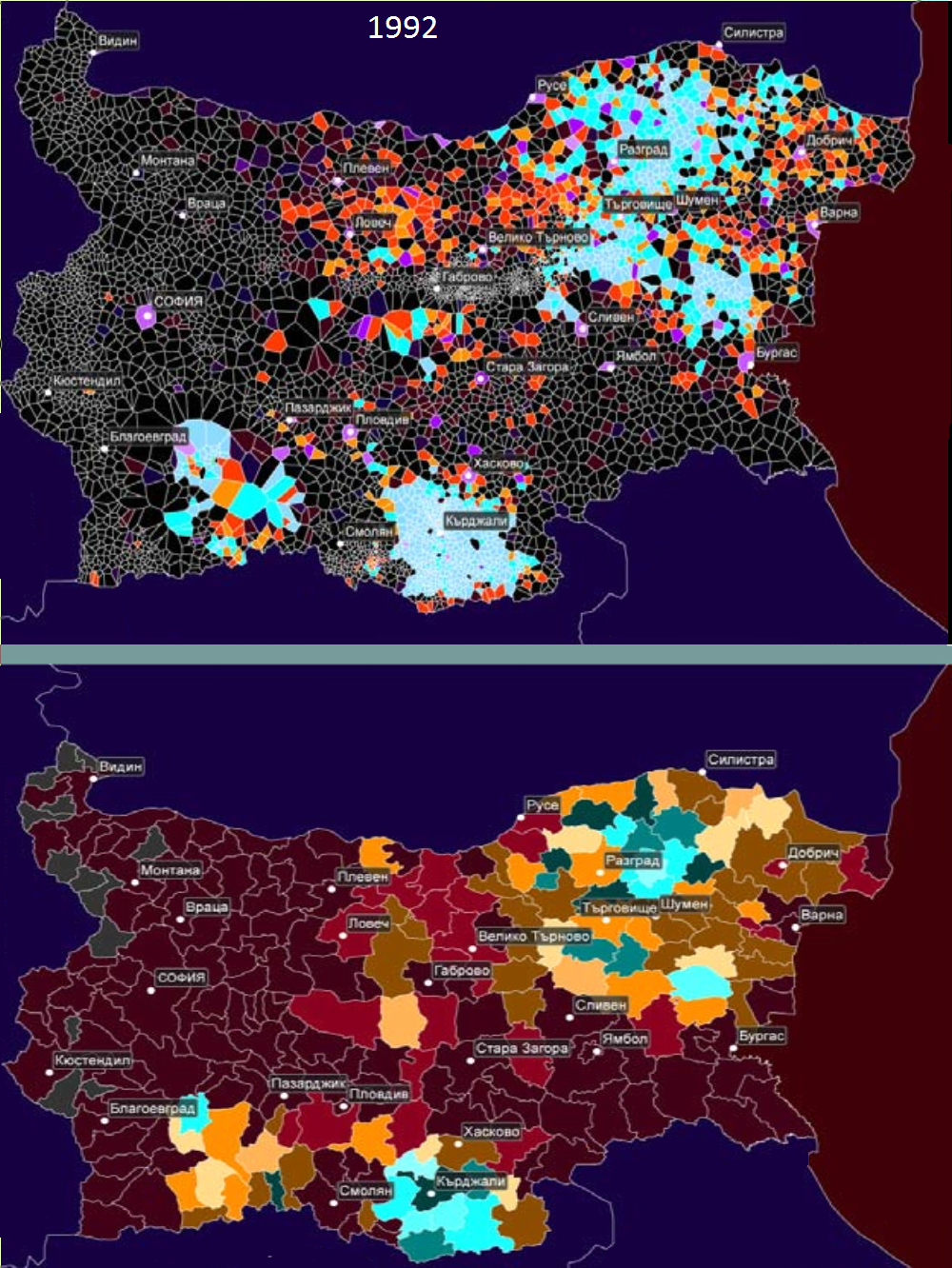
Distribution of Turks according to the 1992 census

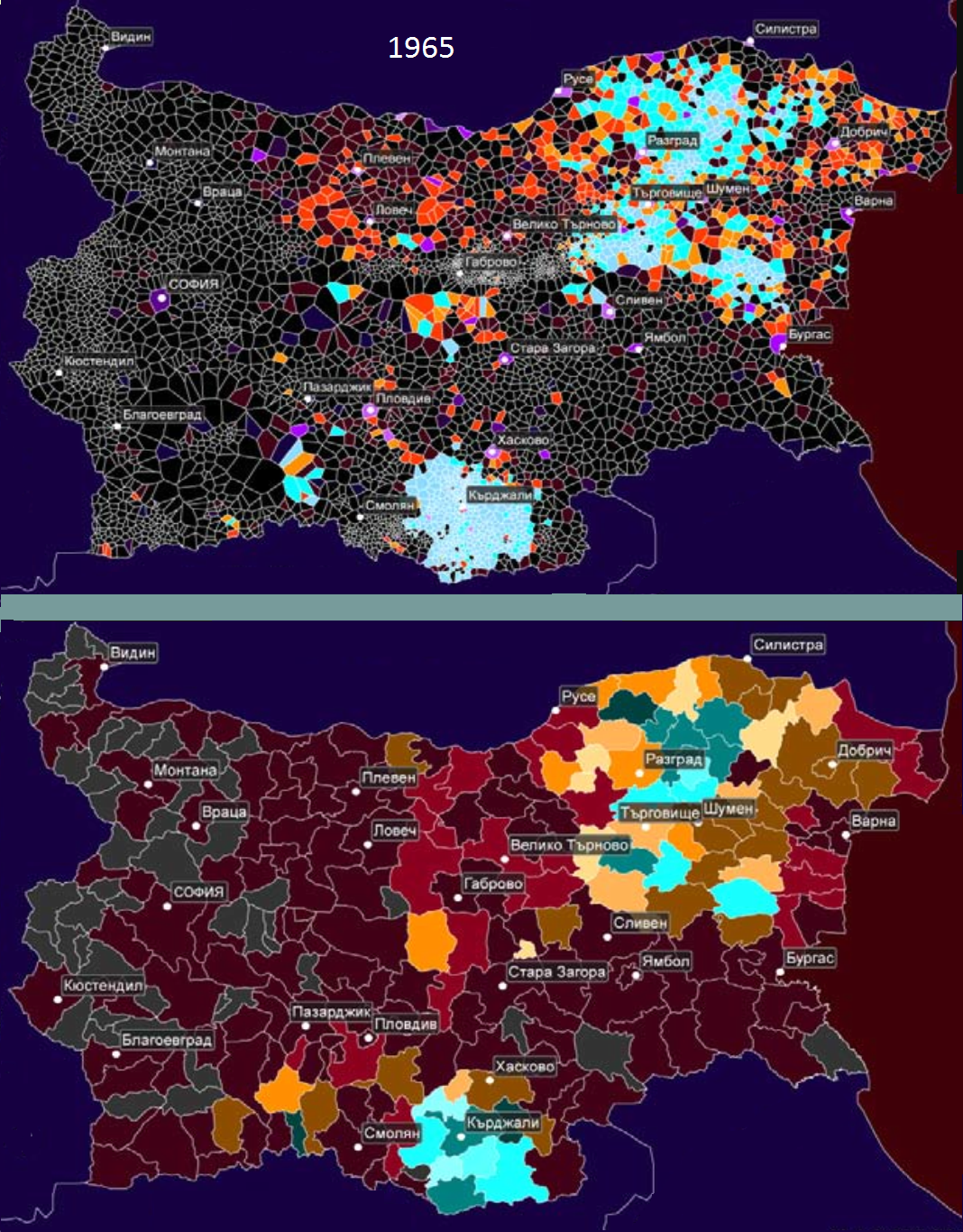
Distribution of Turks according to the 1965 census

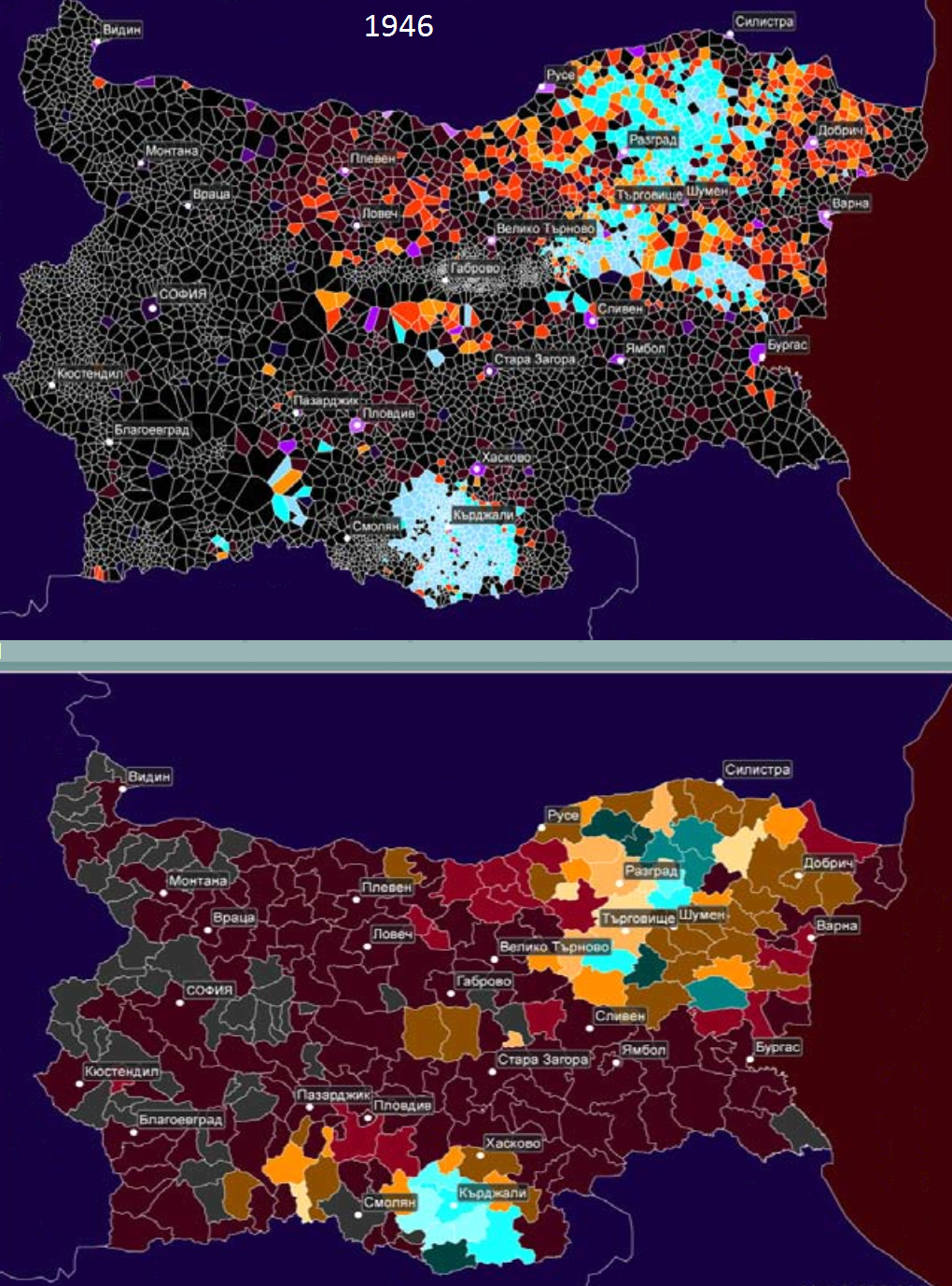
Distribution of Turks according to the 1946 census

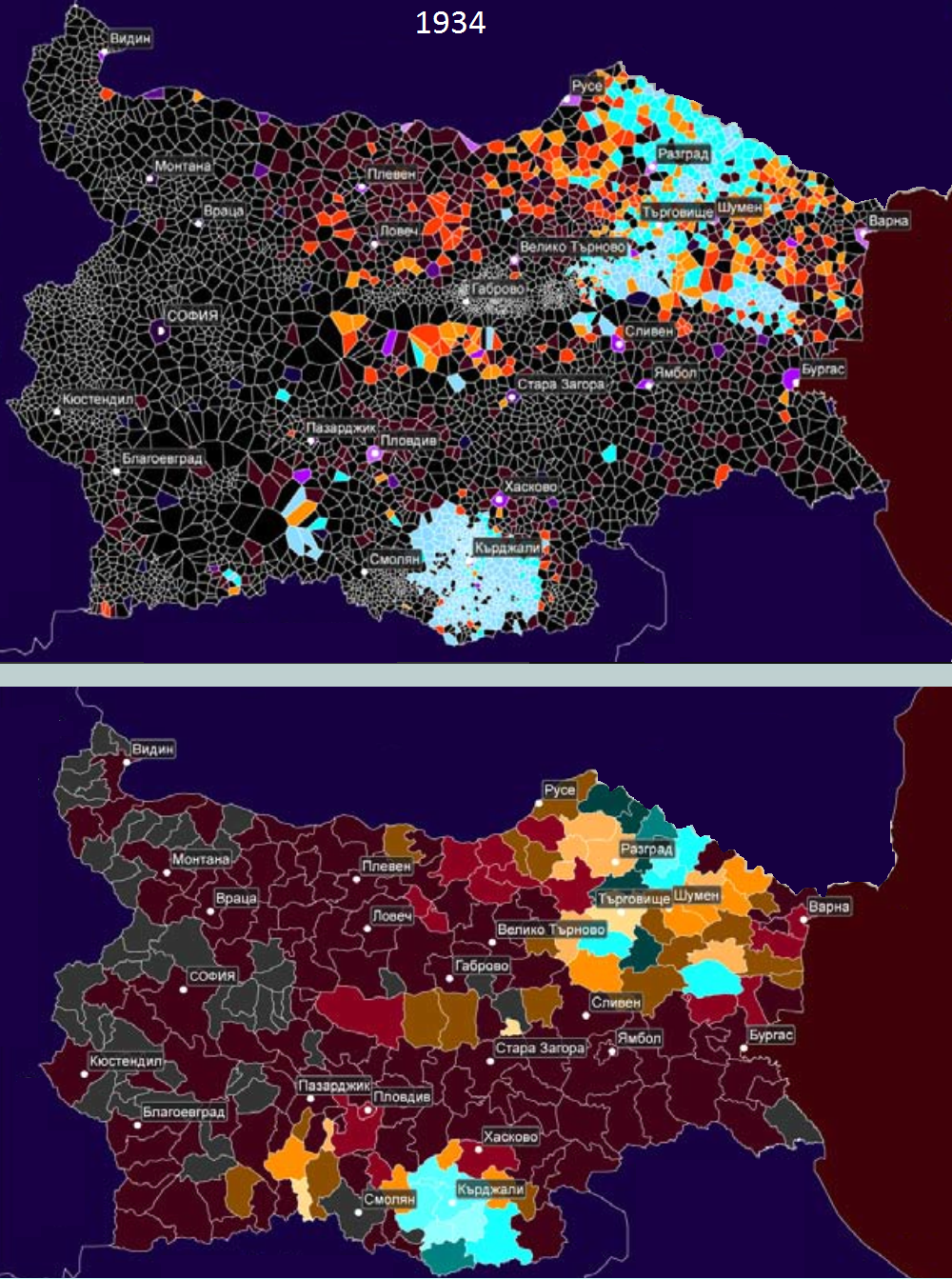
Distribution of Turks according to the 1934 census

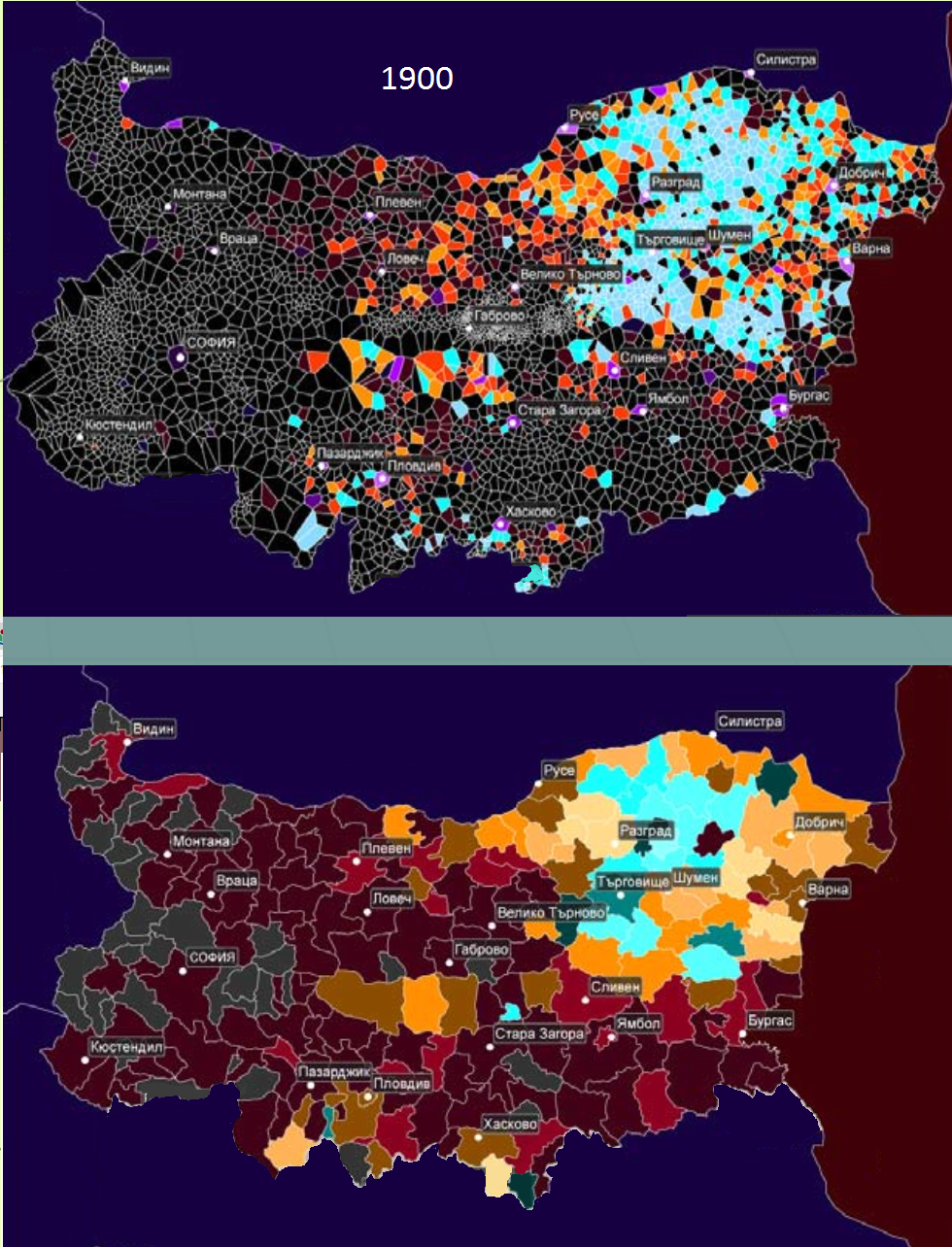
Distribution of Turks according to the 1900 census

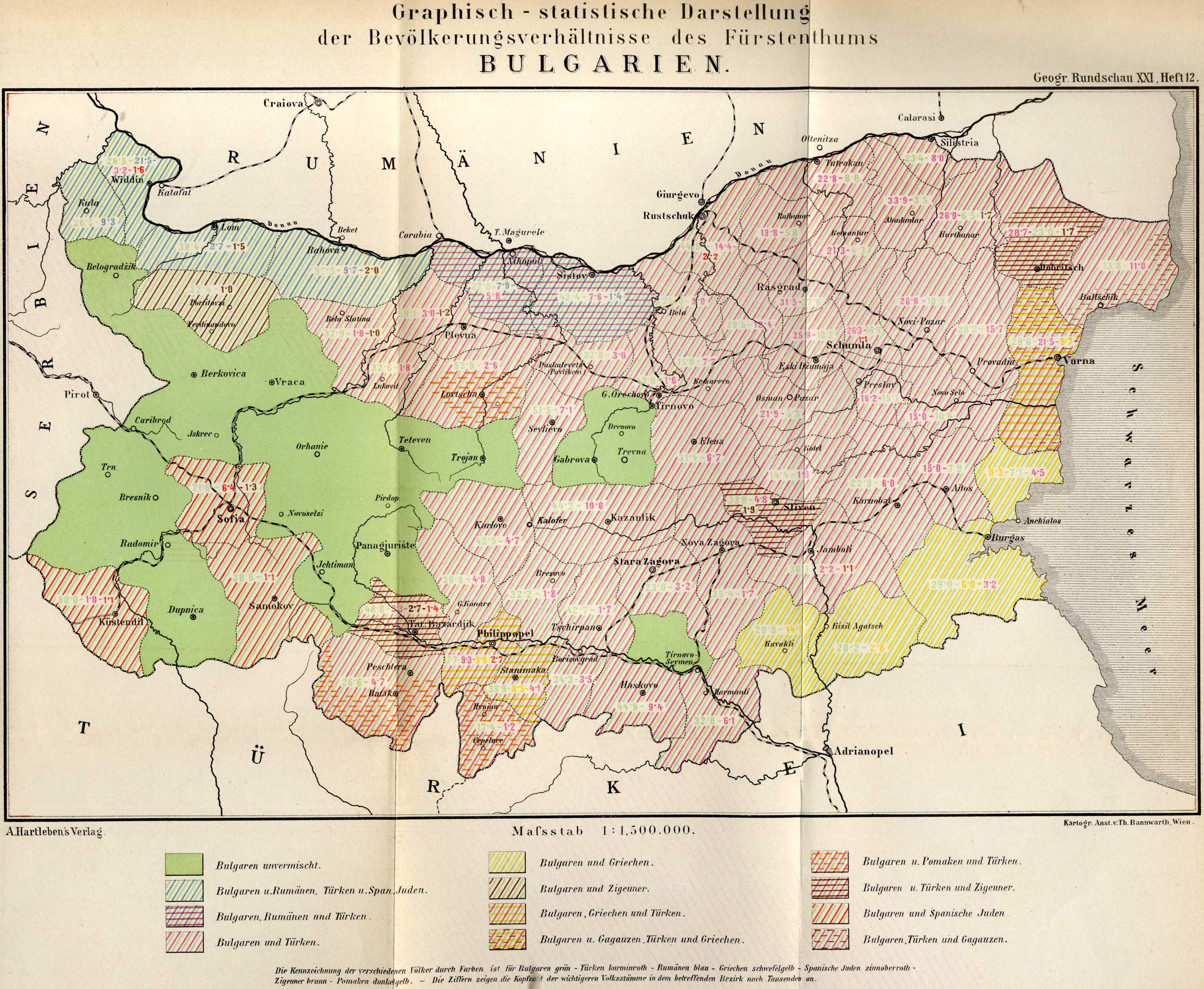
Ethnic distribution according to the 1892 census

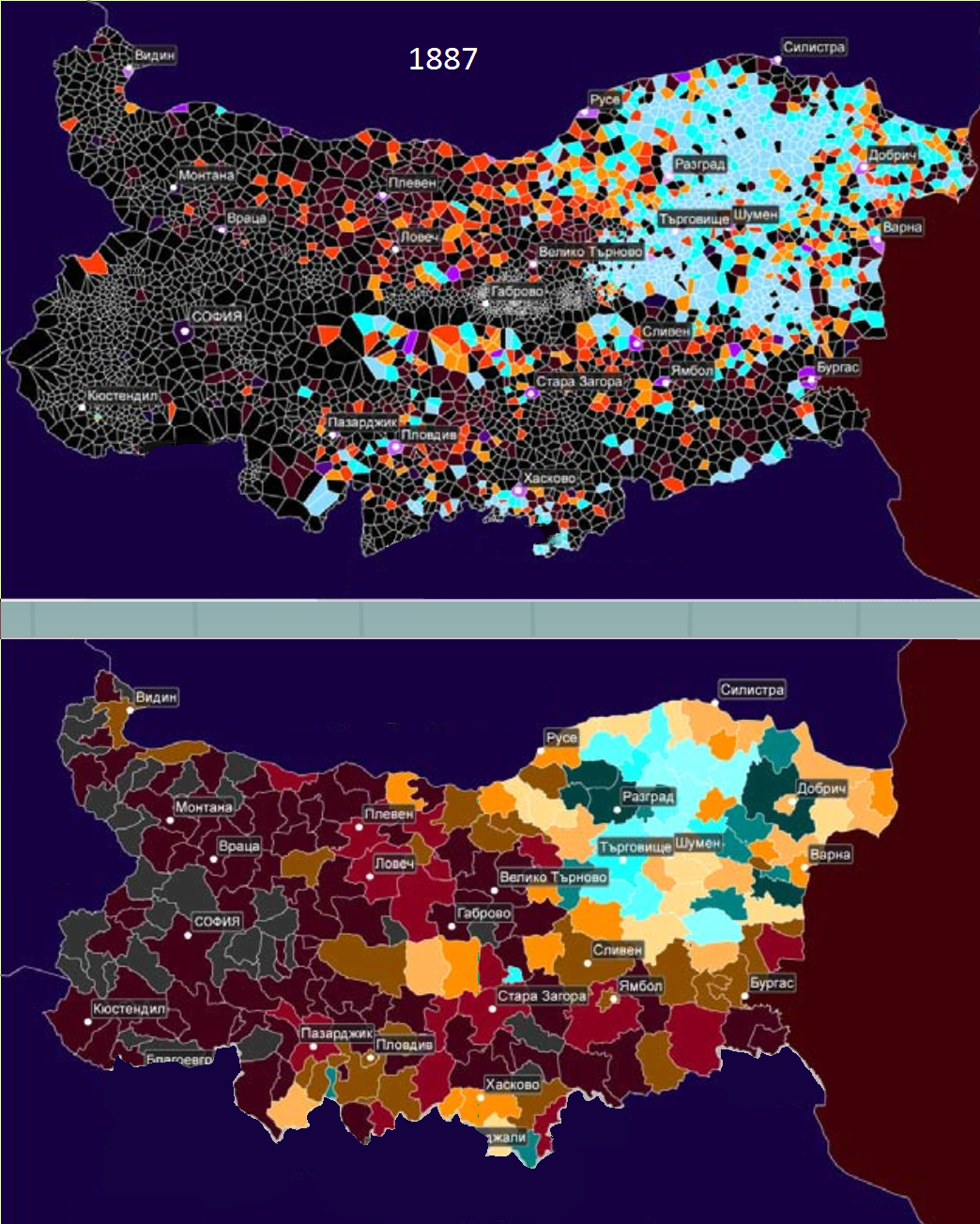
Distribution of Turkish speakers in 1887 including Gagauz settlements in Silistra, Varna and Dobrich regions

== History ==
Turks, although today numerically small – about 1 million people (about 2 percent of the total Balkan population) – have played a role in shaping the history of the Balkans far beyond their numbers.

=== Possible settlement in the pre-Ottoman period ===
While Turks settled in Bulgaria during and after the Ottoman conquest, there are indications that some Turks possibly settled before this period. According to early historical compilations and translations of Ibn Bibi's History of the Seljuq Sultanate of Rum an account is presented of Turkish immigration from Anatolia to Dobruja. Ibn Bibi's historical memoirs cover the period 1192–1281 well before Ottoman rule over the Balkans. The work of Ibn Bibi finished in 1281 and was written in Persian for one of the last Rum Seljuk Sultans Kaykhusraw III. In his Turkish translation called the Selçukname Yazıcıoğlu Ali describes how Seljuk Turk troops joined their Sultan 'Izz al-Din Kayka'us II (Kaykaus II) to help the Byzantine Emperor Michael VIII Palaiologos in his military campaigns. It is claimed that during this campaign Seljuks settled in Dobruja. As a result of Babai revolt, in 1261, one of the Turkoman dervish Sari Saltuk was forced to take refuge in the Byzantine Empire, alongside 40 Turkoman clans. He was settled in Dobruja, whence he entered the service of the powerful Muslim Mongol emir, Nogai Khan. However the Byzantines didn't control Dobruja at the time, which was part of Bulgaria and they didn't have a common border with the Tatars. Sari Saltuk became the hero of an epic, as a dervish and ghazi spreading Islam into Europe. As described in the works of Ibn Battuta and Evliya Çelebi, Seljuk Turks settled in area of Dobruja along the Black Sea coast in the borderland between what is now Bulgaria and their furthest outpost Babadag situated in Northern Dobruja. Part of them returned to Anatolia, while the rest became Christianized and adopted the name of Gagauz. There are also doubts about these events, which according to some scholars have the characteristics of a folk legend.

=== Settlement during the Ottoman period ===
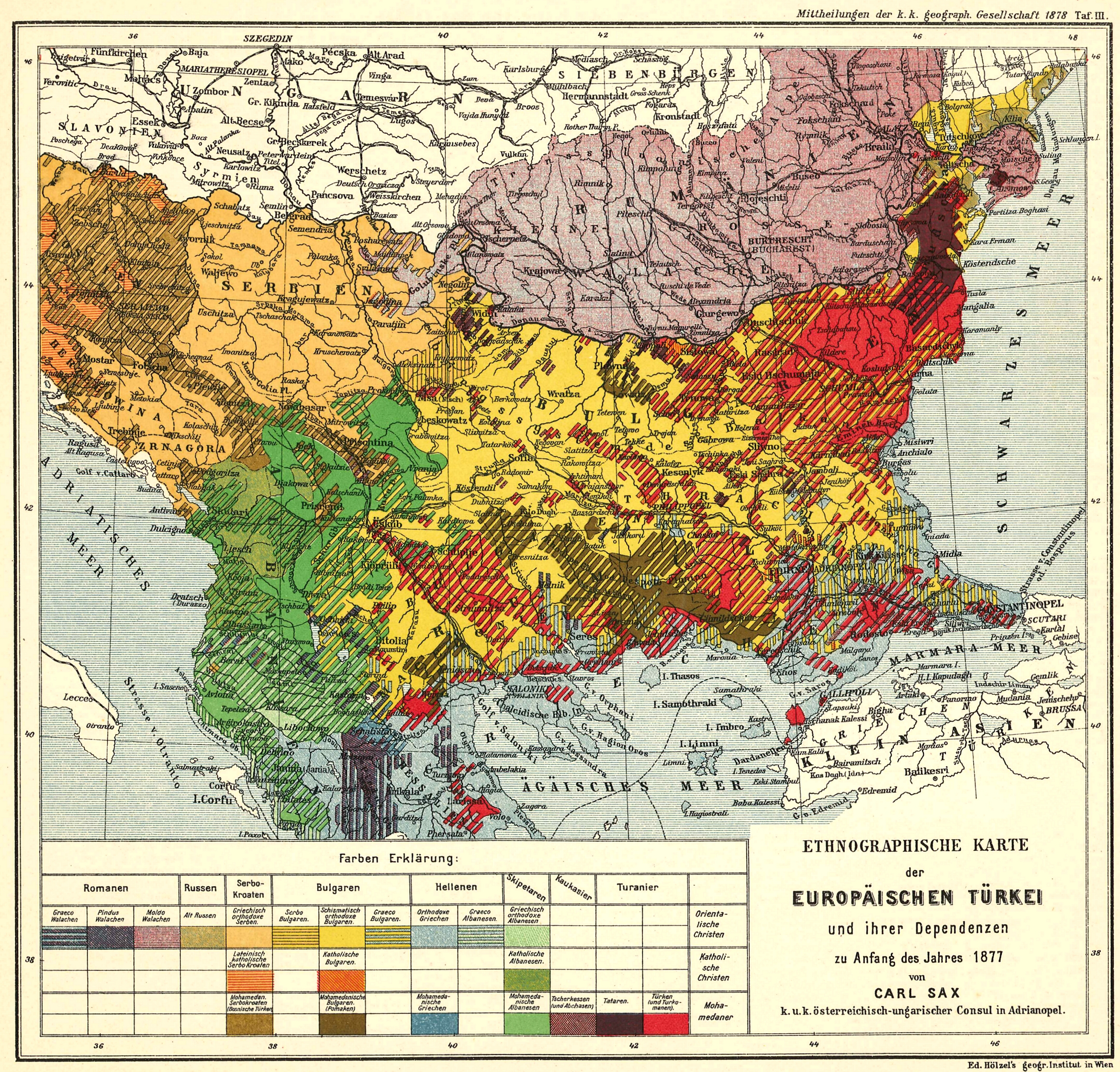
Ethnological Map of European Turkey and her Dependencies at the Time of the Beginning of the War of 1877, by Karl Sax, I. and R. Austro-Hungarian Consul at Adrianople. Published by the Imperial and Royal Geographical Society, Vienna 1878. Most of the Turkish families who settled in the Bulgarian territories left during population exchanges.

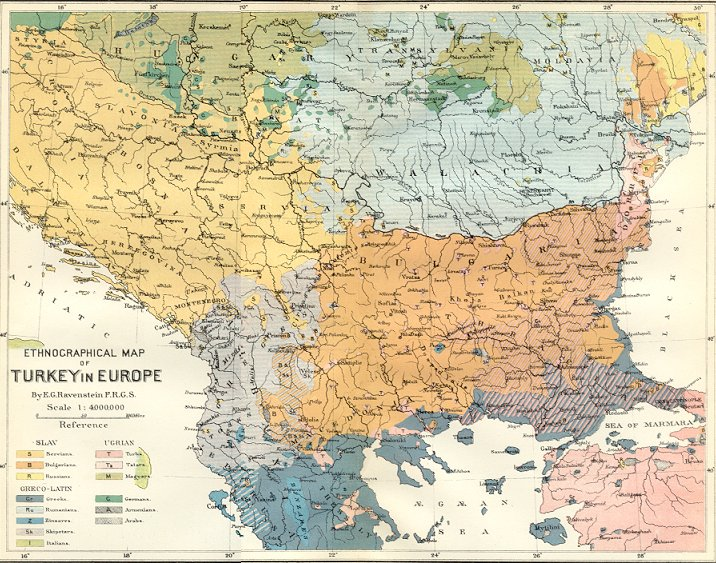
Ethnic composition of the central Balkans in 1870 by the English-German cartograge E.G. Ravenstein.

The conquest of the Balkans by the Ottomans set in motion important population movements, which modified the ethnic and religious composition of the conquered territories. This demographic restructuring was accomplished through colonization of strategic areas of the Balkans with Turks brought or exiled from Anatolia, establishing a firm Turkish Muslim base for further conquests in Europe. Ottoman Empire used colonization as a very effective method to consolidate their position and power in the Balkans. The colonizers that were brought to the Balkans consisted of diverse elements, including groups uneasy for the state, soldiers, nomads, farmers, artisans and merchants, dervishes, preachers and other religious functionaries, and administrative personnel. Among the earliest arrivals were large numbers of pastoral peoples such as the Yürüks, Turcomans (Oghuz Turks), Tatars from Anatolia and Crimean Tatars (Qaraei or Kara Tatars) led by their chieftain Aktav. As the Ottomans expanded their conquests in the Balkans, they brought nomads from Anatolia and settled them along the main highways and in the surrounding mountain regions. Densely populated Turkish colonies were established in the frontier regions of Thrace, the Maritsa and the Tundzha valleys. The colonization policies already begun under Orhan were continued by his successors Murat I (1360–84) and Bayezit I (1389–1402). Additional colonists, mostly nomads again, were established along key transportation and communication routes in Thrace, Macedonia, and Thessaly. The Ottoman authorities maintained these nomads in their tribal organization through the 16th century and began to settle them only during the 17th century.

In addition to voluntary migrations, the Ottoman authorities used mass deportations (sürgün) as a method of control over potentially rebellious elements in the Balkans and in Anatolia. Far away from their home bases, the potential threat of such elements was considerably reduced as in the case of the followers of the rebellious Karamani Pir Ahmed. Tribal resistance was followed by large-scale transfers of Karamanid and Türkmen nomads to Deliorman and Rumelia. Deportations in both directions occurred throughout the 14th, 15th, and 16th centuries.

After the defeat of Bayezid I at the battle of Ankara by the forces of Tamerlane in 1402, the Ottomans abandoned their Anatolian domains for a while and considered the Balkans their real home, making Adrianople (Edirne) their new capital. The Timurid invasions and other upheavals in Anatolia brought additional Turkish settlers into the Balkans. Numerous Turkish colonists were settled as farmers in new villages. Vakıf deeds and registers of the 15th century show that there was a wide movement of colonization, with western Anatolian peasantry settling in Thrace and the eastern Balkans and founding hundreds of new villages. Some other settlers came in search of military and administrative service, and still others to establish Islamic religious institutions. Muslims were settled densely along the two great historical routes of the Peninsula, one going through Thrace and Macedonia to the Adriatic and the other passing through the Maritsa and Tundzha valleys to the Danube. The Yürüks were settled mostly in the mountainous parts of the area. A census conducted between 1520 and 1530 showed that 19% of the Balkan population was Muslim.

The greatest impact of Ottoman colonization in the Balkans, however, was felt in the urban centers. Many towns became major centers for Turkish control and administration, with most Christians gradually withdrawing to the mountains. Historical evidence shows that the Ottomans embarked on a systematic policy of creating new towns and repopulating older towns that had suffered significant population decline and economic dislocation during the two centuries of incessant wars preceding the Ottoman conquest, as well as the ravages of the Ottoman conquest itself. Often re-colonization of old towns and the establishment of new towns were accompanied by bodily transplanting settlers from other areas of the Empire or with Muslim refugees from other lands. Records show that by the end of the 14th century, Muslim Turks formed the absolute majority in large urban towns in Upper Thrace such as Plovdiv (Filibe) and Pazardzhik (Tatar Pazarcik).

=== Ottoman architecture in Bulgaria ===
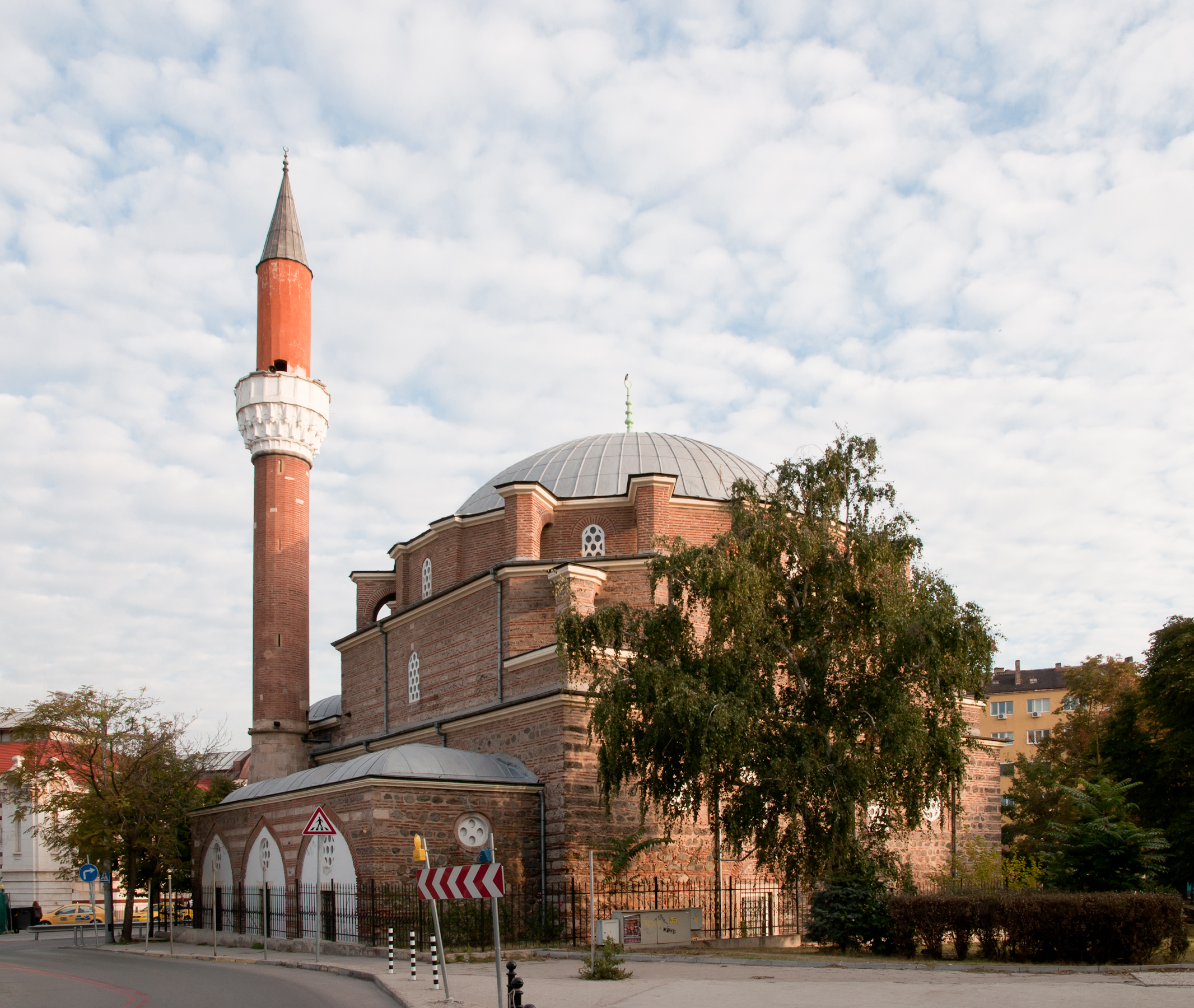
Banya Bashi Mosque in Sofia

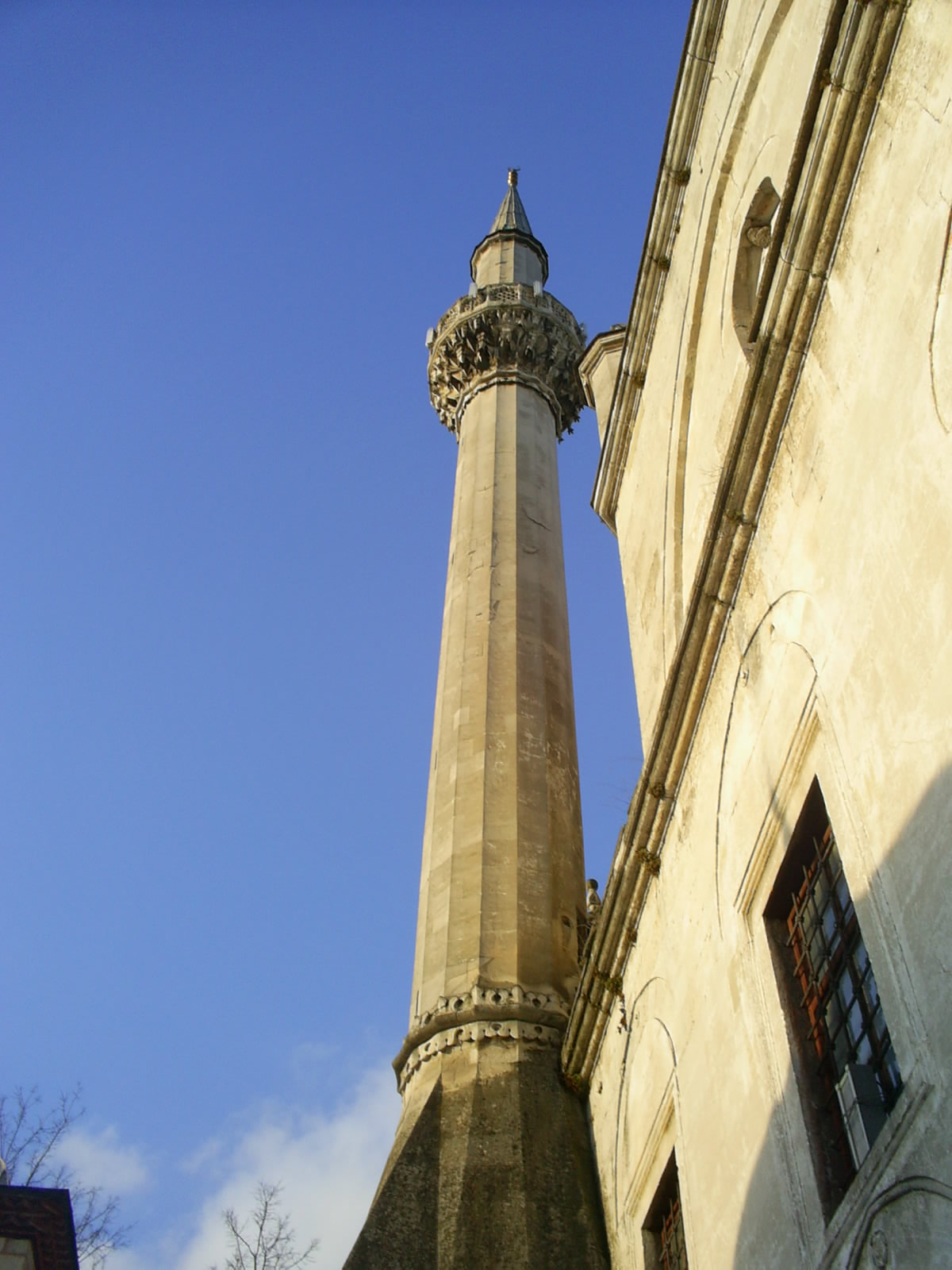
Tombul Mosque in Shumen

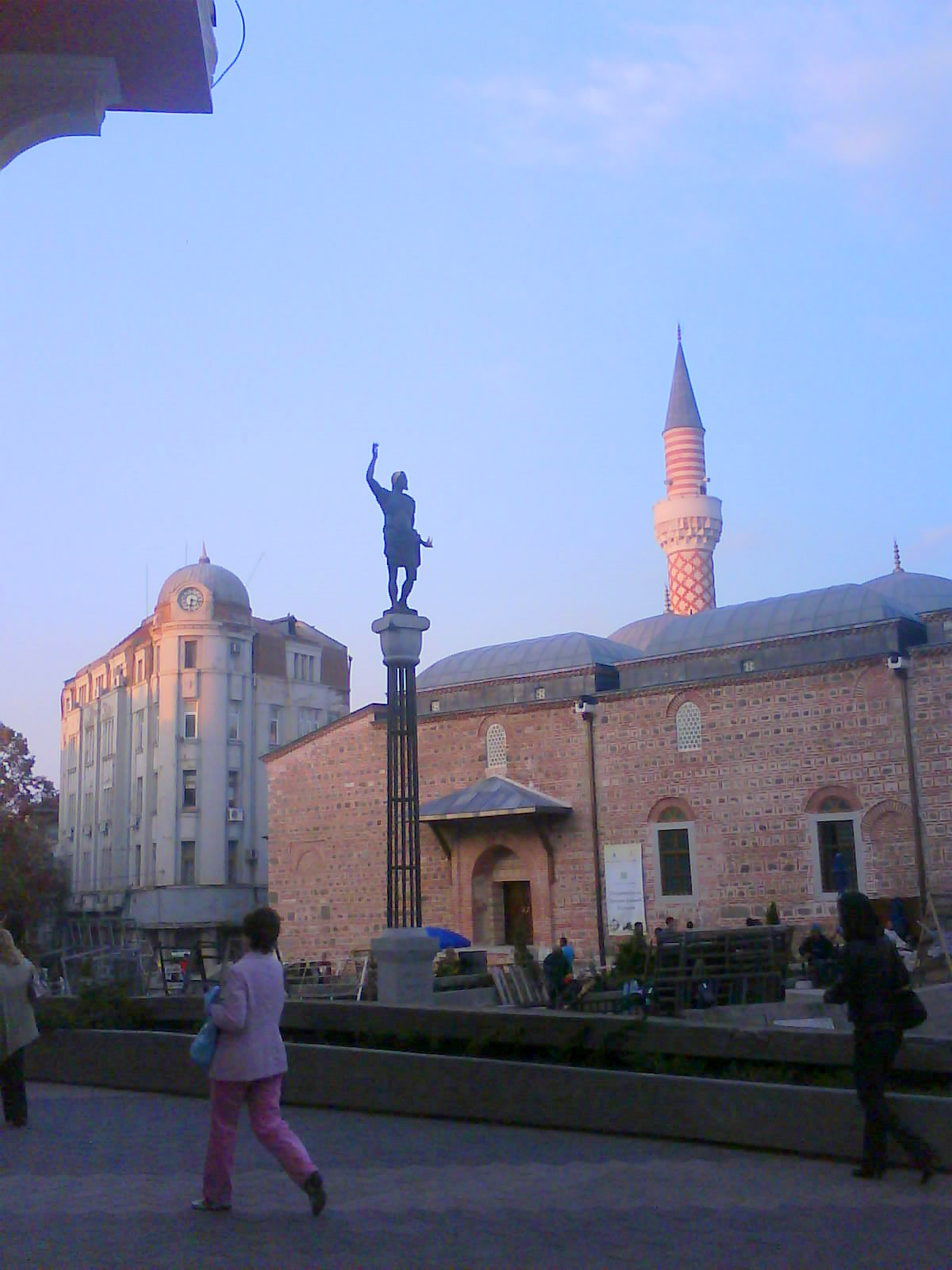
Plovdiv Cuma Mosque in Plovdiv

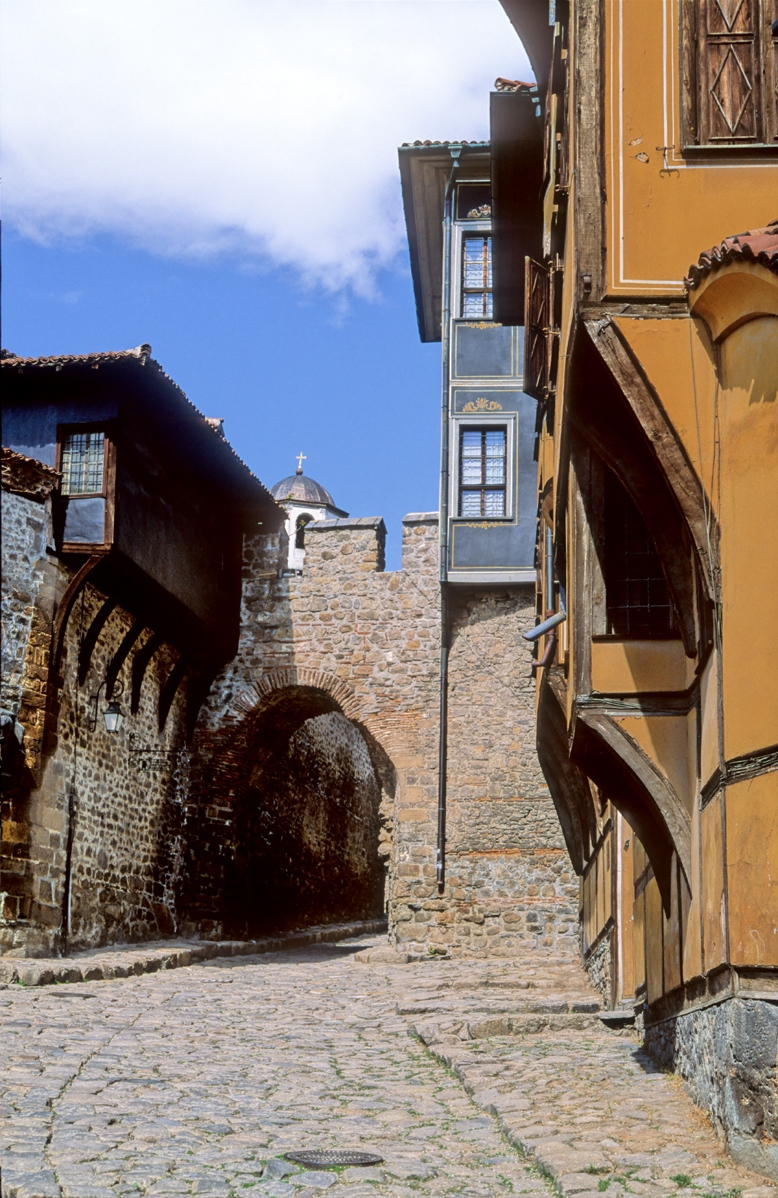
Old Plovdiv

Ottoman architecture has shaped and left visible marks on the Balkan urban landscape. Two distinct crafts are evident in Ottoman urban culture that of the architect and that of the master builder (maistores in Macedonia and Epirus, kalfa in Anatolia and sometimes in Bulgaria) who shared the responsibilities and tasks for the design and construction of all sorts of building projects. During Mimar Sinan's period as a chief imperial architect until the second half of the 16th century between forty and seventy architects produced designs for a very large labour force, controlled the construction of military and civil facilities, water and road infrastructure from Budapest to Cairo. The centralized has or hassa (sultan's property and service) system had allowed a small number of architects to control all significant imperial and most vakif building sites over the vast territories of the empire. In the 18th century the empire was opened to Western influence. By the late 18th century a growing number of Ottoman Christians were recruited. Until the very end of the Ottoman state the master builders maintained a cultural equilibrium between the Ottoman spirit and architectural innovation both in the Balkans and Anatolia. Turkish, Slavic, and Greek masters combining Western styles with Ottoman views extended the architectural landscape with one of the best examples being the Filibe-Plovdiv symmetrical house. Innovations were derived from the Ottoman house and market (çarşı) buildings in Anatolia, Macedonia, and Bulgaria.

=== Liberation to Communist rule (1878–1946) ===
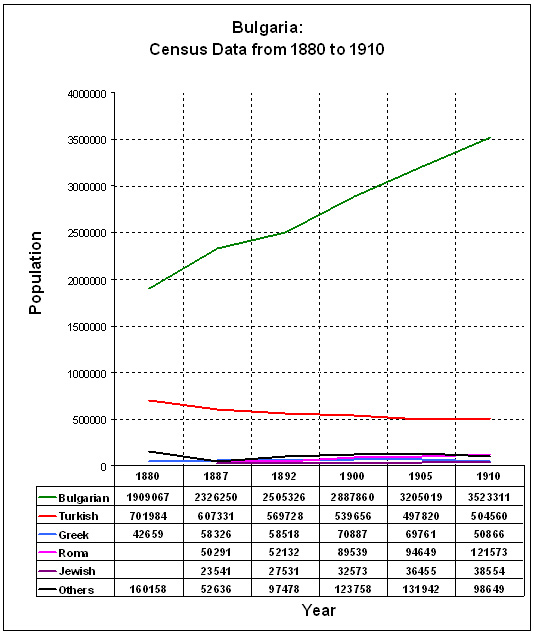
Population of Bulgaria between 1880 and 1910

The estimates of the number of Turks in the current Bulgarian territories prior to the Russo-Turkish War of 1878 vary. Major urban centers were with Muslim majority and remained overwhelmingly Muslim well until the 19th century. According to Aubaret, the French Consul in Ruse in 1876 in the Danube Vilayet, which was partly outside modern Bulgaria there were 1,120,000 Muslims of whom 774,000 were Turks and 1,233,500 non-Muslims of whom 1,150,000 were Bulgarian (in comparison, the 1881 Bulgarian census registered 1,345,000 in the smaller area of the Bulgarian principality). According to him in the Rusçuk sancak there were 388,000 Turks and 229,500 Bulgarians, in Varna sancak the Turks outnumbered with 92,800 people the 32,200 Bulgarians there with more contrast. According to census and Salname the Muslims had been dominant in the northeast a century earlier. In 1876 Niš and Sofia sancak were detached from the Danube Villayet, joining the Kosovo Vilayet and Adrianople Vilayet, and 1.100.000 Muslims as well as 1.700.000 non-Muslims lived in this region before the Russo-Turkish War of 1877–1878. As Russian forces and Bulgarian volunteers pushed south in January 1878 they inflicted a welter of atrocities on the local Muslim population. NYT 23 November 1877. The Ottoman army has also been accused of attacking Muslim non-combatants and using refugees to shield their retreat. Certainly many perished of hardship during their flight. The number of casualties is uncertain, it is estimated at tens of thousands. The figure of refugees is uncertain too, Professor Richard Crampton estimates it as an exodus of 130,000–150,000 people of whom approximately half returned for an intermediary period encouraged by the Congress of Berlin in 1878, while Dr. Hupchick claims that the refugees were 500,000. Atrocities against the Turks and Pomaks committed by Russian troops and Bulgaria units are also described in the 1878 Rhodope Commission signed by French, Italian, English and Turkish representatives. The Commission points out the burning of 80 Muslim villages after signing the armistice and a number of other war crimes against the Muslim civilian population. The Commission presents the figure of 150,000 refugees in and around the Rhodope Mountains.

According to Justin McCarthy, the Russian aim was to inflict massive Muslim civilian casualties. The victims are put into four categories: 1) battle casualties 2) murders by Bulgarian and Russian troops 3) denial of necessities for life leading to starvation and death from disease 4) death caused by refugee status. Members of the European press who covered the war in Bulgaria reported on the Russian atrocities against Muslims. Witness accounts from Shumen and Razgrad describe children, women and elderly wounded by sabres and lances. They stated that the entire Muslim population of many villages had been massacred.

The Ottoman army committed numerous atrocities against Christians during its retreat, most notably the complete devastation of Stara Zagora and the surrounding region, which might have provoked some of the attacks against ethnic Turks. There were also returning in the homeland Bulgarian refugees from Wallachia, Moldavia and Russia which escaped from the Ottoman rule.

During the War many Turks, including large and small landowners, abandoned their lands. Though many returned after the signing of the treaty of Berlin they were soon to find the atmosphere of the lands they had left behind uncongenial and large numbers emigrated once again to the more familiar cultural and political atmosphere of the Ottoman Empire.

According to the 1881 census there was a majority of over 400,000 Turkish speakers living with 228,000 Bulgarian in the northeast Bulgarian Principality. In 2011 about 50% of the Turks live in northeast making up 20% of the population of the region.

Bulgarian population increased from two million at the 1881 census to two and a half million by 1892, and stood at three and a half million by 1910 and at four million by 1920. This increase took place while a large number of Bulgaria's Turkish-speaking inhabitants were emigrating. At the census in 1881 the Turkish-speaking people in Bulgaria and Eastern Rumelia were about 700,000 and represented 24.9% of the population, yet by the 1892 census the proportion was 17.21 percent and by the 1910 census 11.63%; in the same years the Bulgarian speaking people were 67.84%, 75.67% and 81.63% of the total.

During the Balkan Wars in August 1913 the majority Muslim population of Western Thrace (including the regions of the Southern Rhodope Mountains and the Kircaali/Kurdzhali region) established the Provisional Government of Western Thrace. The short-lived republic had a population of over 230 000 of which app. 80% were Turks and Pomaks. Western Thrace was left to Bulgaria with the Istanbul agreement signed on 29 September 1913 which guaranteed the rights of Turks living in the region. The region stayed under Bulgarian control until 1919. Since Bulgarians comprised only a fraction of the population of Western Thrace ceding the territory to Bulgaria was seen as an unacceptable option by both the population of Western Thrace and Turkey at that time. Having lost the territory in 1913 the Ottoman State intended to keep the area mainly Turkish populated with hopes of one day regaining Western Thrace. A convention signed between Bulgaria and Turkey in 1925 allowed the emigration of approximately 700,000 Turks from Bulgaria to Turkey up to 1940.

==== Turkish press in Bulgaria 1879–1945 ====
The Turkish press in Bulgaria established itself almost simultaneously with the foundation of the Bulgarian Principality in 1878. Under the new ("foreign") Bulgarian administration the Turkish intellectuals felt the need to communicate the new laws and regulations to the Turkish population by first providing translations of the Bulgarian State Gazette. During the years the number of Turkish newspapers and publications published in the Principality of Bulgaria rose to 90.

The Turkish Press in Bulgaria was faced with many difficulties and a significant amount of newspapers operated on the verge of being banned and their journalists being expelled from the country. Turkish journalists and teachers organised by establishing the Islamic Teachers Community in Bulgaria (Bulgaristan Muallimi Islâmiye Cemiyeti) and the Union of Turan Communities in Bulgaria (Turan Cemiyetleri Birliği) which was a youth organisation. The leaders of these organisations met during National Congresses held each year in different locations in Bulgaria. The largest National Congress was held in Sofia in 1929 with over 1000 participants.

Between 1895 and 1945 there were several well known Turkish newspapers in Bulgaria:

Gayret: The newspaper was founded in Plovdiv in 1895 and printed by Filibeli Rıza Paşa. In 1896 the famous Turkish thinker and intellectual Übeydullah Efendi wrote columns in Gayret and in a later stage became the newspaper's head columnist.

Muvazene: The weekly newspaper was first published on 20 August 1897 in Plovdiv by the graduates of the Mektebi Mülkiye Ulumu Siyasie and printed by Filibeli Rıza Paşa. The newspaper's operations temporarily moved to Varna before returning to back to Plovdiv. One of the most known writers in Muvazene was Ali Fefhmi Bey who promoted the unionisation of the Turkish teachers in Bulgaria and was the instigator of the first Turkish teacher's congress in Shumen. During the congress the Islamic Teachers Community in Bulgaria (Bulgaristan Muallimi Islâmiye Cemiyeti) was founded.

Rumeli – Balkan: Founded in 1904 by Etem Ruhi Balkan. After the first three editions the newspaper's name was changed to Balkan. Daily editions were published until the eruption of the Balkan Wars in 1912. The newspaper was also printed by Maullimi Mehmet Mahri and Halil Zeki Bey. Since Etem Ruhi was often imprisoned the management of the newspaper shifted to Hüsnü Mahmut in 1912 and 1917 Halil Ibrahim became the head editor. The newspaper ended its publications in 1920.

UHUVVET: Founded by unknown group of journalists on 24 May 1904 the weekly newspaper was printed in Rousse and focused on politics and daily events. In 1905 Mehmet Teftiş became the manager of the newspaper.

Tuna: Founded on 1 September 1905 by Mehmet Teftiş, Tuna was a daily newspaper printed in Rousse. After 415 editions the newspaper ended its operations, however on 13 October 1908 the publications of Tuna resumed after a group of intellectual Turks established a separate company designated to meet the needs for a Turkish daily newspaper in the region. The main contributors in the new Tuna newspaper were Tahir Lütfi Bey, Hafız Abdullah Meçik and Kizanlikli Ali Haydar.

Terbiye Ocağı: Established in 1921 by the Islamic Teachers Community in Bulgaria (Bulgaristan Muallimi Islâmiye Cemiyeti) and printed in Varna between 1923 and 1925. Known contributors in Terbiye Ocağı were Osman Nuri Peremeci, Hafız Abdullah Meçik, Hasip Ahmet Aytuna, Mustafa Şerif Alyanak, Mehmet Mahsum, Osmanpazarli Ibrahim Hakki Oğuz, Ali Avni, Ebuşinasi Hasan Sabri, Hüseyin Edip and Tayyarzade Cemil Bey.

Yoldaş: Founded in 1921 by Hafız Abdullah Meçik and published every second week in Shumen. Yoldaş was one of the first Turkish children's publications in Bulgaria.

DELİORMAN: Owned by Mahmut Necmettin Deliorman the newspaper started its publications on 21 October 1922 in Razgrad with Ahmet Ihsan as its head editor. Between 1923 and 1925 Mustafa Şerif Alyanak took on the job of head editor with weekly editions. Deliorman also functioned as the main publication for the Turkish Union of Sport's Clubs in Bulgaria. Turkish columnists such as Hasip Saffeti, Ahmet Aytuna, Hafiz Ismail Hakki, Yahya Hayati, Hüsmen Celal, Çetin Ebuşinasi and Hasan Sabri were household names in Deliorman.

Turan: Founded on 6 May 1928 in Vidin, Turan was a channel for the Union of Turkish Youth Communities in Bulgaria. The newspaper was also printed in Kardzhali and Varna until it was closed in 1934.

Tebligat: Founded in 1929 and published by the office of the Grand Mufti and Islamic Foundations in Sofia.

Rodop: Founded in April 1929 in Kardzhali by Lütfi Takanoğlu. Rodop focused on the rights, freedoms and national matters of the Turkish population in Bulgaria. Most known writers in Rodop were Mustafa Şerif Alyanak and Ömer Kaşif Nalbandoğlu. As many other Turkish newspapers in Bulgaria Rodop was forced to stop its operations during 1934 and its writers were either expelled or forced to seek refuge in Turkey.

Professor Ali Eminov from Wayne State College has compiled an extensive list:

With the right-wing coup d'état of 1934, Turkish-language press was suppressed. Only in the course of the first year, ten of the newspapers were closed down (including Deliorman and Turan), and by 1939, a single newspaper Havadis ("The News") survived, only to be closed down in turn in 1941. The explanation cited was that the newspapers were disseminating Kemalist (i.e. Turkish nationalist) propaganda.

==== Transfer of land ====
The transfer of land from Turkish to Bulgarian ownership which was the most important effect of Turkish emigration was a complex process. Such transfers had taken place before 1878, for example parts in the Tatar Pazardzhik district, where Bulgarian landowners had been unknown in 1840, some two thousand plots had been bought by them between 1872 and 1875. In 1877 and in the following years the process of transfer took place on an immensely greater scale, both here and elsewhere. In 1875 some 50% of the land in Rumelia was owned by Turks. A decade after 1878 as much as a quarter of the arable land in Bulgaria transferred from Turkish to Bulgarian ownership.

With the outbreak of war some Turks sold their property, mostly to wealthy local Bulgarians. Other Turks rented their lands, usually to dependable local Bulgarians, on the understanding that it would be handed back if and when the owners returned. Most departing Turks, however, simply abandoned their land and fled, the fall of Pleven had made it clear that the Russians were to win the War. As the Turks fled many Bulgarians seized some of the land now made vacant. The incidence of seizure varied regionally. In the north-east the Turks were numerous and, feeling safety in numbers, few of them had left and those remaining were therefore strong enough to discourage seizures by Bulgarians. In the north and south-west on the other hand almost all Turks had fled and their lands were immediately taken over by local Bulgarians who often divided up the large estates found in these areas. In the remainder of northern Bulgaria transfers, often under the cloak of renting, took place in approximately one third of the communities. In the Turnovo province, for example, there were 77 Turkish mixed Turkish-Bulgarian villages of which 24 (31.0%) were seized by Bulgarians, 22 (28.5%) were later repossessed by returning Turkish refugees, and another 22 remained unaffected; the fate of the remaining nine is unknown. In the south-west there was much more tension and violence. Here there were no provisions about renting and there were cases of Bulgarian peasants not only seizing land but also destroying buildings.

In the vast majority of cases it was local Bulgarians who seized the vacant land but Bulgarians from other parts of Bulgaria where there had been little Turkish emigration and Bulgarian refugees from Ottoman repressions in Macedonia and Western Thrace also took part in the seizures. In later months the publication of the terms of the Treaty of Berlin naturally intensified the flow of refugees from these areas and according to the prefect of Burgas province as helping themselves to émigré land "in a most arbitrary fashion".

In Burgas and the rest of Eastern Rumelia the Treaty of Berlin intensified the land struggle by making Bulgarians more determined to seize sufficient land before Ottoman sovereignty was restored. It also encouraged the former Turkish owners to return. With these problems the Russian Provisional Administration had to contend.

The Provisional Administration did not have the power, even if it had had the will, to prevent so popular a movement as the seizure of vacant Turkish land, but nor could the Administration allow this movement to go completely unchecked for this would give the Turks and the British the excuse to interfere in the internal affairs of the liberated territories. Given these dangers the Russians handled the agrarian problem with considerable skill. In the summer of 1877 Bulgarian refugees from Macedonia, Thrace and Ottoman Rumelia had been allowed to harvest the crops left by Turkish émigrés and in September all Bulgarians, the incoming refugees and the indigenous, were allowed to sow vacant Turkish land, though it was insisted that this did not in any way signify a transfer of ownership. With the mass exodus of Turks after the Treaty of San Stefano the Provisional Administration had little choice but to allow the Bulgarians to work the vacant land with rent, set at half the value of the harvest, to be paid to the legal owner. In many cases the Bulgarians simply refused to pay this rent and the Russians were not over-zealous in collecting it.

When the Treaty of Berlin guaranteed Turkish property rights and restored southern Bulgaria to the Sultan's sovereignty at least 80,000 of the 150,000 Turkish émigrés had returned by September 1878. This caused enormous problems including housing the returning Turks whose property had been taken over by Bulgarians or destroyed. In September local authorities ordered that any houses taken over by Bulgarians were to be restored to their former owners on the latter's demand, whilst other returning Turks were given Tatar or Circassian land.

These problems were insignificant compared to those raised when the returning Turks demanded the restitution of their lost lands.

In July 1878 the Russian Provisional Administration had come to an agreement with the Porte by which Turkish refugees were allowed to return under military escort, if necessary, and were to have their lands back on condition that they surrendered all their weapons. In August 1878 it was decreed that those returning would not be immune from prosecution and anyone against whom any charges were substantiated would be deprived of his lands. This decree, more than anything else, discouraged the return of more Turks and from the date of this enactment the flow of returning refugees began gradually to diminish. There were, however, many claims still to be dealt with and in November 1878 mixed Turkish and Bulgarian commissions were established in all provinces to examine these claims. The decisions were to be made in accordance with rules drawn up by the Russian embassy in Constantinople in consultation with the Porte, and under them Bulgarians could secure the legal right to a piece of land if they could produce the authentic title-deeds, tapii, and thereby prove that the land at dispute had originally been taken from them forcibly or fraudulently.

After the departure of the Russians in the spring of 1879 the administration in Plovdiv ordered to enforce court decisions returning land to the Turks. Only half of the courts had recorded such decisions. Other actions were even less emotive and in 1880 the position of the Bulgarians in Eastern Rumelia had improved. The Plovdiv government introduced new methods for authenticating claims, allowing local courts to issue new title deeds if they were satisfied that existing documentation proved ownership, or if local communal councils had issued certificates attesting ownership. Most local councils were entirely Bulgarian or were dominated by Bulgarians and decided in favour of their co-nationals far more often than did the mixed commissions with whom the prerogative of adjunction had previously rested. In many instances, too, Bulgarians refused to relinquish land they had seized and as late as 1884 there were still Turkish landlords demanding the implementation of court orders restoring their property.

The Bulgarians in Rumelia were also helped from 1880 onwards because the Turks began to drift once more into exile. This was very much the result of disappointed hopes for a full restoration of Turkish power south of the Balkan range.

The Turks were also encouraged to emigrate from Bulgaria by regulations which affected the cultivation of rice – which was originally introduced to the region by the Turks. This was part of a project to eradicate malaria that included also draining of swamps in the Tundzha, Arda, and Maritsa Basins. The project succeeded in eradicating malaria, however, it also exacerbated droughts in those regions. Rice was a staple crop for the Turks and in its prohibition many of them saw yet another sign of unacceptable Bulgarian domination. An even more important impulse to Turkish emigration was the Bulgarian land tax of 1882. After the abolition of feudalism in the 1830s use of that land conferred temporary wardship upon the user, and thus the tithe which had been the main levy on land until 1882 conformed to traditional Islamic codes of thought and practice. The land tax did not. Furthermore, land tax applied to all land in a man's possession not, as under the tithe, merely to that part which had been cultivated. This hit the Turks hard for they customarily left a large proportion, in many cases as much as half, of their land fallow. Taxation now fell on the fallow land too but production and earnings could not be increased by the same proportion and as a result many of the remaining Turkish owners of large estates left Rumelia. Significantly 1882 was the peak year for the sale of larger Turkish properties in Rumelia, though the sale of such properties continued steadily throughout the first half of the 1880s. From the end of the war to the summer of 1880 only six large Turkish chifliks in Eastern Rumelia had been sold but the five years before union with the Principality of Bulgaria in 1885 saw the sale of about a hundred. That most of the larger Turkish owners and many smaller ones left Rumelia was undoubtedly an important factor in the easy attainment of Bulgarian supremacy in Rumelia during the early 1880s.

In Principality of Bulgaria as in Rumelia the chaos of war had allowed a number of seizures to go unrecorded meaning that the new occupiers were to be left in untroubled possession of their land. The Constituent Assembly had considered a proposal to legislate such illegal transfers but no action had been taken as Karavelov had easily persuaded the Assembly that it was pointless to legislate about so widespread a phenomenon. The Bulgarians in the Principality could afford such bold stance as there was little danger of direct Ottoman intervention over the land question. There was a constant stream of emigration by Turks from Bulgaria and by the early 1890s so many Turks had left the former Turkish stronghold of north-eastern Bulgaria that the government in Sofia began to fear that the area would be seriously under-populated. In 1891 the Minister of Finance reported to the Subranie that there were 26,315 vacant plots in the country, many of them in the north-east and most of them under twenty decares in extent.

In Bulgaria the government also took possession of Turkish land which had been vacant for three years. A number of returning Turkish refugees who demanded restitution of or compensation for their lands were denied both on the grounds that they had without duress left their property unworked for three years. Land rights of Muslim owners were largely disregarded despite being guaranteed by the powers. The historian Michael Palairet has claimed that de-Ottomanization of Bulgaria and Eastern Rumelia led to the economic decline in the region, which is contradicted by many other historians, who show rapid growth of the economy as well as rapid industrial development and growth of exports in Bulgaria after 1878.

==== Language and education ====
After the Russo-Turkish War in 1878 the Bulgarian Turks lost their social and political domination in Bulgaria. The official Turkish language became the language of a minority. In 1875 there were 2,700 Turkish primary schools, 40 secondary schools and 150 medreses in the Danube Vilayet. By 1913 the number of Turkish schools was reduced to 1,234 all of which had to be financed by the Turkish community.

Following the First World War the Bulgarian government provided financial assistance to the Turkish schools and their number grew to 1,712 with 60,481 pupils. As the fascist regime gained power in 1934, Turkish school, which had adopted the Latin alphabet following the reforms in Turkey, were forced to teach in the Arabic script. This was in order to reduce the nationalistic influences coming from Turkey.

As the Communists took control in Bulgaria in 1944 they delivered on their promises for more liberties for the ethnic minorities. Turkish schools were reopened and the usage of the Latin script allowed. The new regime however nationalised the schools and took them under state control. In 1944 there were 84,603 Turkish children in school age, 40,388 of whom did not attend school. According to the law, graduates from Turkish schools were considered as illiterate.

In 1956 the number of Turkish schools is put at 1,149 with 100,843 pupils and 4,527 teachers. After 1958 the Turkish language in these schools was replaced with Bulgarian as the official language and Turkish became an elected subject. After 1970 teaching Turkish in schools was abolished and by 1984 the use of the Turkish language itself was deemed illegal. The only two remaining bi-lingual journals Yeni Işık and Yeni Hayat were printed in Bulgarian only.

=== During Communist rule (1945–1989) ===
==== Initial improvements (1944–1956) ====
After the Communist takeover in 1944, the new regime declared itself in favour of all minorities and inter-ethnic equality and fraternity (in accordance with the classic doctrine of proletarian internationalism) and annulled all the "fascist" anti-Muslim decisions of the previous government. This included banning the "Rodina" organization, re-establishing the closed Turkish minority schools and founding new ones. The new constitution had many provisions regarding minority protection and in particular guaranteed the right to mother tongue education and free development of culture for all national minorities. Further legislation required new Turkish minority textbooks to be issued and allocation of air time for radio broadcasts in Turkish. For the first time since the ban by the previous regime, Turkish-language newspapers and magazines and Turkish-language editions of Bulgarian press were launched, starting in 1945, including Vatan ("Fatherland"), Işık ("Light"), Halk Gençliği, Yeni Işık and Yeni Hayat ("New Life"). In 1947, even an "affirmative action"-like policy was implemented, as Turkish minority members were accepted to higher education institutions without an entrance examination; such practices would continue in later years, as special efforts were made to further the active involvement of Muslims in the Communist Party and in the political life of the country; but this special treatment may have been motivated also by the hope that such integration could encourage their cultural assimilation as well. However, the emigration of Turks and Pomaks to Turkey was periodically banned starting in 1949; Turkey also obstructed immigration from Bulgaria with tough requirements. However in 1950-1951 there was an exodus; around 155,000 Turks left Bulgaria for Turkey. The migration of Pomaks was banned, since they were seen as ethnically Bulgarians, unlike the Turkish people. Also, Turks and other minorities were not admitted into military service for some time, and even after the official decision to allow it in 1952, their admission would still require them to meet certain undefined political criteria.

==== Assimilation policy (1956–1989) ====
The Imaret Mosque, Plovdiv, Bulgaria, also known as the Sehabüddin Pasha Mosque, built in 1444; during the late 1980s, the grounds of the mosque were turned into rubbish tip; this photograph was taken in 1987. Today, this mosque is again in use and is also a branch of the Archeological Museum, and a popular tourist destination. In the garden yard of this mosque are a number of grave markers where notable citizens of "Philibe" were buried. These valuable historic markers are badly deteriorated by vandalism, time and neglect.

Starting in 1956, the regime gradually began to embark on a long-term assimilation policy towards the Turks, which was routinely pursued with more or less intensity until the end of Communist rule and culminated in two periods of intensive campaigns, each lasting several years. The most wide-ranging and public one, directed against the Turks, took place in 1984–1985 and was officially called "the Revival Process" (a term also used, though more rarely, for the other large campaign, which was organized against the Pomak identity in 1971–1974). One of the main aspects of these campaigns was the forced name-changing episodes of the country's Muslim population, in addition to efforts to obliterate traditional clothing, prohibit Muslim customs and deny the use of Turkish language. Apart from these violent episodes, the long-term policy was expressed in various other facts: for example, Turkish-language publications were closed down one by one, and by 1981 only a single newspaper (Yeni Işık ) survived, until it ceased to be published in 1985. Significantly, the new "Zhivkov constitution" of 1971 replaced the term "national minorities" with "nationals of non-Bulgarian origin".

===== Campaign against the Pomaks =====
The assimilation policy targeted first the Bulgarian speaking Muslim population, the Pomaks, continuing the practice of the pre-Communist regime. Some of the methods used by "Rodina" were adopted by the Communist regime and the Pomaks were systematically targeted mainly in 1964 and 1970–1974. There are numerous examples of the brutality employed during these forced assimilation operations such as the events in March 1972 in the village of Barutin where police and state security forces violently crushed a demonstration against the assimilation policies of the regime by the majority Muslim population killing 2 civilians and inflicting gunshot wounds on scores of others. In March 1973 in the village of Kornitsa situated in the mountainous region of South-West Bulgaria the local Muslim population resisted the forced name changing and attempted to demonstrate against the government's suppressive actions. As a response the Bulgarian security forces killed 5 villagers and wounded scores of civilians. By 1974, 500 of the 1,300 inmates of the notorious Belene labour camp were Pomaks who had resisted pressure to change their names.

===== The "Process of Rebirth" =====
The Process of Rebirth (also "Process of Revival" – Bulgarian:Възродителен процес) was the culmination of the assimilation. With this explicit policy, enacted between 1984 and 1989, the Bulgarian government forced Bulgaria's Turkish community – 900,000 people or 10 percent of the country's population, to change their names. The people affected were all ethnic Turks. By 1984 other Muslims, mostly the Muslim Roma and the Pomaks had already been forced to give up their Turkish or Muslim names for Christian names. The government had been encouraging the educated Turks to voluntarily adopt Bulgarian names.

The exact reasons for Zhivkov's mass-scale assimilation programme are unclear, but it is believed that one of the main factors was the projection that by 1990 the Bulgarian population would experience a zero or negative population growth resulting in increasing Muslim population and declining Bulgarian population.

In June 1984, the Politburo voted a policy named "For the further unification and inclusion of Turks into the cause of socialism and the policies of the Bulgarian Communist Party". The plan was to rename all Islamic minorities with Slavic names, ban the wearing of distinctive Turkish clothing, to forbid the use of the Turkish language and close down the mosques. The assimilation campaign was sold to the ethnic Bulgarian majority as an attempt for national "revival" and was called by the authorities "The Revival Process". The ideology behind the term, originally used for the less publicized attempts at assimilation of the Pomaks in the early 1970s, was the claim that the targeted minority had originally been Bulgarian before its conversion or assimilation during the period of Ottoman rule. Thus, the assimilation was supposedly justified by it being a restoration of the population's original "real" identity.

As it was later to turn out the regime was misled by its own agents among the Turkish minority and was taken aback when the Turkish minority refused to submit to the assimilation campaign. The regime found itself in a position where it had to use violence.

On 24 December 1984 Bulgarian police and security forces fired the first shots against the Turkish community in the village of Mlechino (Present name of Süt Kesiği). While Mlechino was held under siege by Bulgarian security forces some 200 Turkish villagers from the smaller nearby towns attempted to break the siege and protest for the return of their passports and reinstatement of their Turkish names. This pattern repeated in many areas in Bulgaria populated with Turks. People from smaller towns and villages attempted to march and enter larger towns and villages to find a government official with greater jurisdiction who would be able to explain why the Turks were being targeted and when they would be able to reinstate their Turkish names and receive back their original identification documents. Often these larger towns of central administration were unreachable since they were besieged by Bulgarian security forces.

On 25 December 1984, close to the town of Benkovski, some 3,000 Turkish protesters from the nearby smaller villages confronted Bulgarian security forces and demanded to have their original identification papers back. The Bulgarian security forces managed to disperse the crowd claiming that they have no idea where their identification papers were and urged them to go back to their villages and inquire from the local mayors. The large police presence was explained with undergoing security forces "exercise manoeuvres". After returning to their towns and discovering that the local municipality didn't have their passports and ID documentation the crowd headed back, this time more decisively, towards the town of Benkovski on the next day (26 December 1984). The Bulgarian police and security forces were prepared and awaiting with some 500 armed men in position. When the crowd of 2,000 Turkish villagers approached the Bulgarian security forces opened fire with automatic weapons wounding 8 people and killing 4. One of the killed was a 17-month-old Turkish baby. The killed were from the villages of Kayaloba, Kitna and Mogiljane. Judging from the wounds of the dead and wounded the police and security force had been aiming at the midsection of the bodies. The captured demonstrators were faced down on the snow for 2 hours and blasted with cold water coming from the fire fighting trucks. In a report by Atanas Kadirev the head of the Ministry of Interior Forces in Kardzhali it is stated "It was interesting how they endured the entire water from the fire fighters' cisterns". The temperature that day was minus 15 degrees Celsius.

On the same day, 26 December 1984, the Turkish community in the village of Gruevo, situated in Momchilgrad county, resisted the entry of security forces vehicles into the village by burning truck tires on the main road. The villagers were temporarily successful, but the security forces returned later that night with reinforcements. The electricity to the village was cut. The villagers organised at the village entrance but were blasted with water mixed with sand coming from the hoses of the fire fighting trucks. Some of the security forces opened fire directly at the villagers and several civilians were wounded and killed. The wounded from bullets attempted to seek help from hospitals but were refused medical treatment. There are reports of incarcerated Turks committing "suicide" while held for police questioning. In demonstrations in Momchilgrad at least one 16-year-old youngster was shot and killed and there are reports of casualties also in Dzhebel. According to the Bulgarian "Ministry of Interior" during these few Christmas days there have been some 11 demonstrations in which approximately 11,000 Turks participated. A large number of the arrested protesters were later sent to the Belene labour camp at the gates of which it is written "All Bulgarian citizens are equal under the laws of the People's Republic of Bulgaria".

One of the most notable confrontations between the ethnic Turk population and the Bulgarian State Security apparatus and army was in the village of Yablanovo during January 1985 where the Turkish population resisted the tanks of the 3rd Bulgarian Army for 3 days. When the village was overrun by the Bulgarian Army the town hall was made a temporary Command Centre and became the scene of terrifying acts of brutality in the name of "Bulgarisation". The torture and violation of the captured resisting Turks was later continued in the underground cellars of the Ministry of Interior in the city of Sliven. The interrogation methods applied on the captured villagers were depicted with the torture of "Jesus Christ before his crucifixion". Over 30 people are reported killed during the events in Yablanovo.

The regime's violence did achieve its immediate aims. All Turks had been registered with Slavic names, Turkish was forbidden in public and the mosques abandoned. This however was not the end of the matter but the beginning of the revival of the Turkish identity where the oppressed minority strongly re-defined itself as Muslim and distinct. Bulgarians came to be seen as occupiers and oppressors and protest demonstrations took place in some of the bigger villages in the southern and northern Turk enclaves. Moreover, the Turkish community received the solidarity of Bulgarian intellectuals and opponents of the regime.

===== Militant attacks =====
Several militant attacks were committed in the period between 1984 and 1985. The first attack was on 30 August 1984, when one bomb exploded on Plovdiv's railway station and another one in the Varna airport on a date when Todor Zhivkov was scheduled to visit the two towns. One woman was killed and 41 were wounded. On 9 March 1985, attacks going even further as an explosive device was planted on the Sofia-Burgas train and exploded on Bunovo station in a car that was specifically designated for mothers with children, killing seven people (two children) and wounding nine. The accused perpetrators, three Turkish men from the Burgas region who belonged to the illegal Turkish National Liberation Front (TNLF), were arrested, sentenced to death and executed in 1988. On 7 July 1987, militants detonates three military fragmentation grenades outside hotel "International" in Golden Sands resort at the time occupied with East German holiday-makers, trying to get attention and publicity for the renaming process.

Apart from these acts, the ethnic Turks in Bulgaria used nonviolent ways to resist the regime's oppression, though as noted above there were some violent clashes during the actual renaming process. Notably, intellectuals founded a movement, which was claimed to be the predecessor of the Movement for Rights and Freedoms (MRF). It used civil disobedience and focused on providing information to the outside world of the physical persecution and suppression suffered by the Turks. The activities of the movement consisted of peaceful demonstrations and hunger strikes with the goal of restoring civil liberties and basic human rights.

===== The "Big Excursion" =====
In May 1989, there were disturbances in regions inhabited by members of the Turkish minority. In the so-called "May events" of 1989, tensions reached boiling point as tens of thousands of Turkish demonstrators took to the streets in the north-eastern and south-eastern provinces. The demonstrations were violently suppressed by police and the military forces. On 6 May, members of the Turkish community initiated mass hunger strikes and demanded the restitution of their Muslim names and civil liberties in accordance with the country's constitution and international treaties signed by Bulgaria. The participants were members of the "Democratic League" and the "Independent Association". The regime responded with mass detentions and the deportation of activists to foreign countries such as Austria and Turkey. Individuals were driven to the Yugoslav, Romanian or Turkish borders, presented with a tourist passport and extradited without even having a chance of contacting their families first. The mass demonstration in major cities and the regions like Razgrad, Shumen, Kardzhali and Silistra continued systematically all through May 1989. According to the Turkish government, 50 people were killed during the clashes with Bulgarian security forces. The Bulgarian government has put the death toll at only 7.

On 10 May 1989, travel restrictions to foreign countries were partly lifted (only for the members of the Turkish minority). Todor Zhivkov gave a speech on 29 May 1989, in which he stated that those who did not want to live in Bulgaria could emigrate to Turkey and demanded that Turkey open its borders in order to receive all "Bulgarian Muslims". There followed an exodus of 360,000 Turks to Turkey, which became known as "The Big Excursion".

The first wave of refugees was forcefully extradited from Bulgaria. These first deportees consisted of the prisoners of the Belene labour camp, their families and other Turkish activists. People were given 24 hours to gather their luggage before being driven to the border with Turkey in special convoys. Under psychological pressures and fear these were followed by hundreds of thousands. There were also cases where activists of Turkish movements pressured Turks to leave. During the protests in May, the Turkish population effectively abandoned their workplaces in the industrial and agricultural sector. The loss of hundreds of thousands of workers had severe consequences on the production cycle and the whole Bulgarian economy.

In 1998, the Bulgarian president condemned the Revival process and the Big Excursion, nine years after it took place.

=== Migration and expulsion of Turks from Bulgaria to Turkey ===
Migration of Muslims to (Ottoman) Turkey, 1877–2007
Years	Total
1877–78	130,000 (of whom half returned) or 500,000
until 1887	145,284
1887–1892	64,613
1892–1900	50,267
1900–1905	44,718
1905–1910	52,684
1878–1912	350,000
1912–1925	100,000
1923–1949	220,085
1950–1959	154,473
1960–1969	2,582
1970–1979	113,562
1980–1989	225,892 (369,839, to 1990, 154,937 returned)
1989–2001	16,000 or 74,564
2000–2007	138

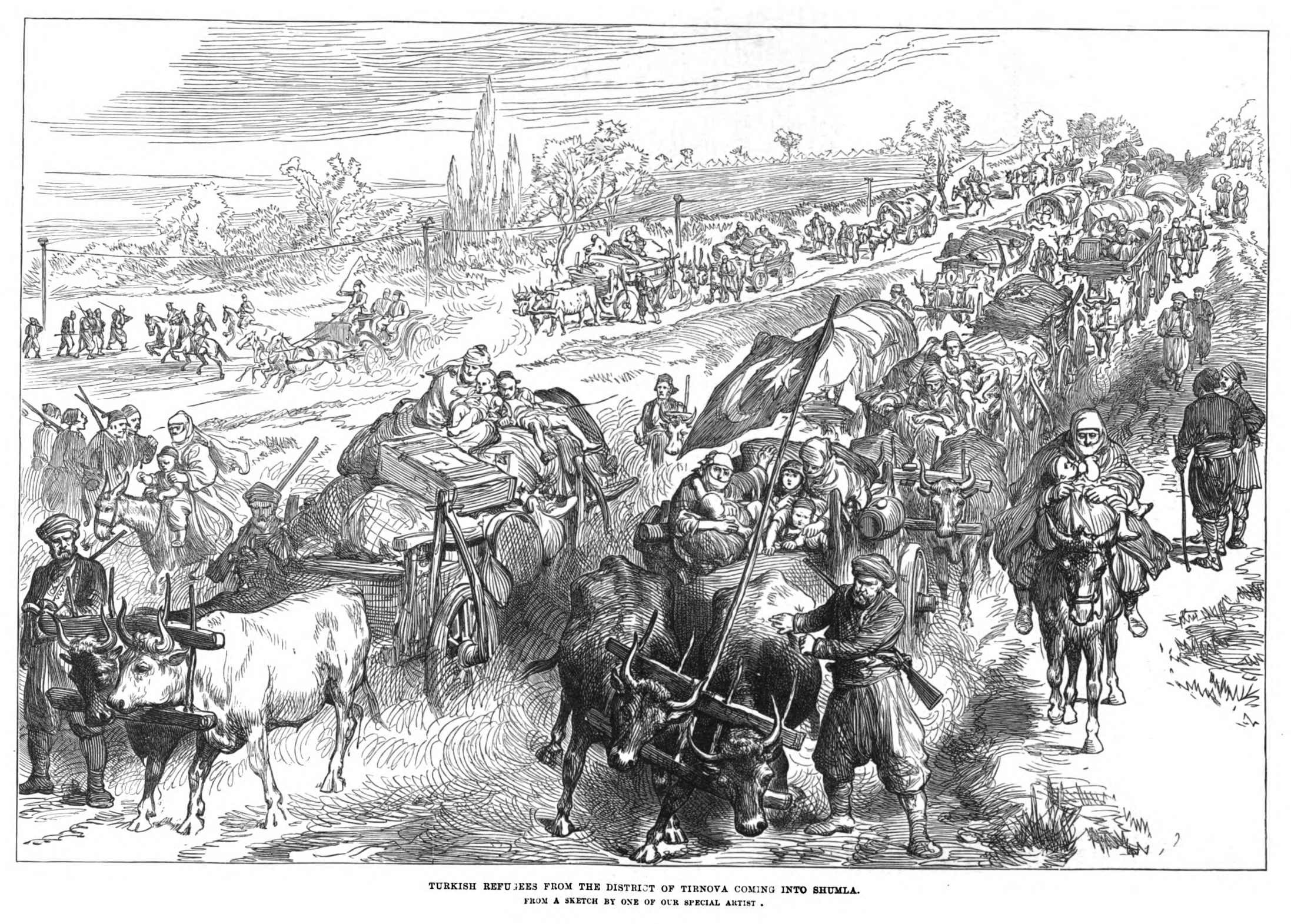
Turkish refugees from the Tirnova district coming into Shumla. The Illustrated London News 1 September 1877.

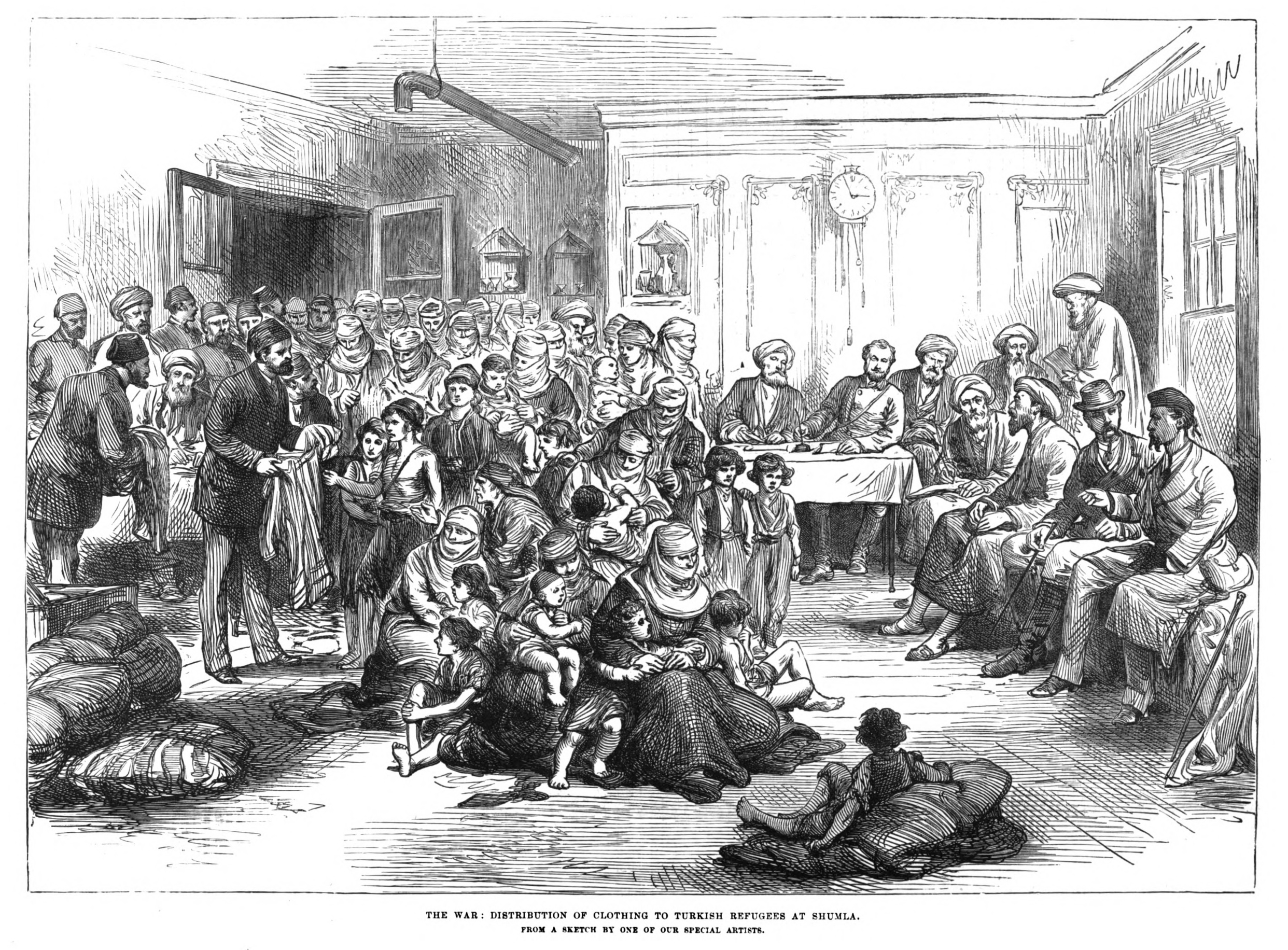
War Distribution Clothing Turkish Refugees Shumla. The Illustrated London News 17 November 1877.

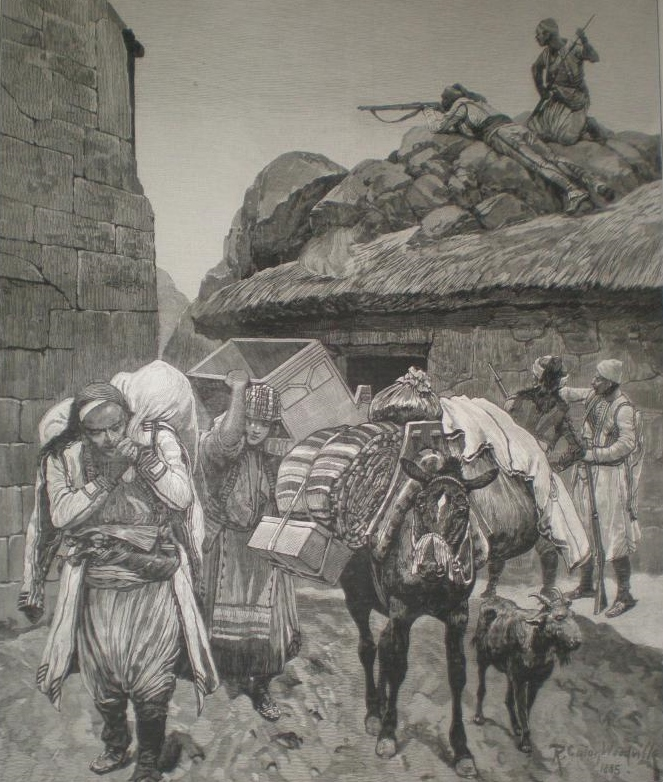
Turkish refugees from Eastern Rumelia in 1885. The Illustrated London News, author: Richard Caton Woodville, Jr.

==== Official recognition of ethnic cleansing ====
The Bulgarian Parliamentary Committee on Human Rights and Religious Freedom approved in February 2010 a declaration, condemning the Communist regime's attempt to forcefully assimilate the country's ethnic Turkish population. The Committee declared the forceful expulsion of 360,000 Turks in 1989 as a form of ethnic cleansing. The committee requested the Bulgarian judiciary and the Chief Prosecutor to renew the case against the architects of the Revival Process.

=== Turks in post-Communist Bulgaria ===
==== Collapse of Zhivkov regime and civil liberties given to Turks ====
On 10 November 1989, Bulgaria's Communist regime was overthrown. On 29 December, the government allowed the Turks of Bulgaria to resume use of their Turkish names. This decision was recognized by law in March 1990. By 1991, some 600 thousand applications were received for the reinstatement of Turkish birth given names. Also in 1991, the Institutition of the Spiritual leader of the Muslims in Bulgaria, the Grand Mufti's Office was founded. In 1991 a new Constitution was adopted granting citizens of non-Bulgarian origin a wide range of rights and lifting the legislative ban on teaching in Turkish. In January of the same year another law was adopted allowing the Turks to change their names or "strike out" their Slavonic endings like "ov", "ova", "ev", "eva" within three years.

As in other parts of Eastern Europe, the repeal of single-party rule in Bulgaria exposed the long-standing grievances of an ethnic minority. The urban intelligentsia that participated in the 1990 reform movement pushed the post-Zhivkov governments toward restoring constitutionally guaranteed human rights to the Turks. But abrogation of Zhivkov's assimilation program soon after his fall brought massive protests by ethnic Bulgarians.

In January 1990, the Social Council of Citizens, a national body representing all political and ethnic groups, reached a compromise that guaranteed the Turks freedom of religion, choice of names, and unimpeded practice of cultural traditions and use of Turkish within the community. In turn the Bulgarians were promised that Bulgarian would remain the official language and that no movement for autonomy or separatism would be tolerated. Especially in areas where Turks outnumbered Bulgarians, the latter feared progressive "Islamification" or even invasion and annexation by Turkey—a fear that was based on the traditional enmity after the Ottoman rule and had been stirred up after the 1974 invasion of Cyprus. This had been part of the propaganda by the Zhivkov assimilation campaign and was revived by politicians in post-Communist Bulgaria. Because radical elements of the Turkish population did advocate separatism, however, the non-annexation provision of the compromise was vital.

The Bulgarian governments that followed Zhivkov tried to realize the conditions of the compromise as quickly as possible. In the multiparty election of 1990, the Turks won representation in the National Assembly by twenty-three candidates of the predominantly Turkish Movement for Rights and Freedoms (MRF). At that point, ethnic Bulgarians, many remaining from the Zhivkov regime, still held nearly all top jobs in government and industry, even in the predominantly Turkish Kurdzhali Province. Parts of Bulgarian society felt threatened by the rise of the MRF. The Bulgarian National Radical Party (BNRP) threatened to surround the Bulgarian Parliament building on the day of the newly elected legislature was scheduled to convene. The BNRP protested the participation of ethnic Turks in the National Assembly and the teaching of Turkish language as a standard curriculum in secondary school with large numbers of Turkish students.

The Patriotic Party of Labour (OPT) was established as the political wing of the National Committee for Defense of National Interests (CDNI). According to its own historiography the OPT emerged due to pressure from ordinary Bulgarian citizens who were outraged by the fact that the MRF was allowed to participate in the 1990 elections. CDNI members were mainly small-shop owners, artisans, farmers and elements of the local communist nomenklatura. The CDNI did not limit itself to rhetoric but also arranged protests against ethnic Turks returning to Bulgaria to claim back their names and property. In October 1991 violent outbreaks occurred between Bulgarian nationalists and Turkish activists in Razgrad.

Bulgarian nationalist forces tried to take advantage of the country's hard economic and uncertain political conditions. In November 1990 massive protests were staged by Bulgarian nationalists in Razgrad area inhabited by a large number of Turks. The nationalists declared an "independent Bulgarian republic" and refused to recognize Sofia's authority over the region. In late November the "Razgrad Republic" was renamed the Association of Free Bulgarian Cities, linking several towns with large Turkish population. The CDNI and other groups opposed restoration of Turkish names, Turkish language lessons in Bulgarian schools and the recognition of ethnic Turks as a national minority in Bulgaria.

These conditions forced the government to find a balance between Turkish demands and demonstrations for full recognition of their culture and language, and some Bulgarians' concerns about preferential treatment for the ethnic minority. In 1991 the most important issue of the controversy was restoring Turkish language teaching in the schools of Turkish ethnic districts. In 1991 the Popov government took initial steps in this direction, but long delays brought massive Turkish protests, especially in Kurdzhali. In mid-1991 continuing strikes and protests on both sides of the issue had brought no new discussions of compromise. Frustration with unmet promises encouraged Turkish separatists in both Bulgaria and Turkey, which in turn fueled the ethnocentric fears of the Bulgarian majority —and the entire issue diverted valuable energy from the national reform effort. The problem was mostly solved in 1991. In the same year a new constitution was adopted which guaranteed citizen with a native language other than Bulgarian the right to study and use their language.

Some developments noted by the US Department of State 2000 report include the fact that Turkish-language classes funded by the government continued, and that on 2 October 2000 Bulgarian national television launched Turkish-language newscasts.

Since 1992, the Turkish language teachers of Bulgaria have been trained in Turkey. At the initial stage only textbooks published in Turkey were used for teaching Turkish, later on, in 1996, Bulgaria's Ministry of Education and Science began publishing the manuals of the Turkish language. A number of newspapers and magazines are published: the "Müslümanlar" ("Muslims"), "Hak ve Özgürlük" ("Right and freedom"), "Güven" ("Trust"), "Jır-Jır" ("Cricket", a magazine for children), "Islam kültürü" ("Islamic culture"), "Balon", "Filiz". In Turkey summer holidays for the Turkish children living in Bulgaria are organized. During the holidays the children are taught the Koran, Turkish literature, Turkish history and language.

==== Movement for Rights and Freedoms ====
At the end of 1984 an underground terrorist organization called the National Liberation Movement of the Turks in Bulgaria was formed in Bulgaria which headed the Turkish community's opposition movement and is responsible for several terrorist acts such as one at the train station at Bunovo which was targeted at a train killing 6 civilians and wounding 9. Three of the members were sentenced to death for the bombing and executed. On 4 January 1990 the activists of the movement, registered an organization with the legal name Movement for Rights and Freedom (MRF) (in Bulgarian: Движение за права и свободи: in Turkish: Hak ve Özgürlükler Hareketi) in Varna, headed by Ahmed Dogan, though a former Bulgarian communist agent himself, his main philosophy was against the communist regime. At the moment of registration it had 33 members, at present, according to the organization's website, 68000 members plus 24000 in the organization's youth wing. With 120,000 members, the Movement for Rights and Freedoms (MRF) was the fourth largest political organization in Bulgaria in 1991, but it occupied a special place in the political process. The leader of the movement, Ahmed Dogan, was imprisoned in 1986. Founded in 1990 to represent the interests of the Turkish ethnic minority, the MRF gained 23 seats in the first parliamentary election that year, giving it the fourth-largest parliamentary voting bloc. Its agenda precluded mass media coverage or building coalitions with other parties, because of the strong anti-Turkish element in Bulgaria's political culture. By mid-1991, the UDF had held only one joint demonstration with the MRF; their failure to reconcile differences was considered a major weakness in the opposition to the majority BSP. In early 1990, the MRF protested vigorously but unsuccessfully its exclusion from national round table discussions among the major Bulgarian parties.

In 1991 the MRF broadened its platform to embrace all issues of civil rights in Bulgaria, aiming "to contribute to the unity of the Bulgarian people and to the full and unequivocal compliance with the rights and freedoms of mankind and of all ethnic, religious, and cultural communities in Bulgaria." The MRF took this step partly to avoid the constitutional prohibition of political parties based on ethnic or religious groups. The group's specific goals were ensuring that the new constitution protect ethnic minorities adequately; introducing Turkish as an optional school subject; and bringing to trial the leaders of the assimilation campaign in the 1980s. To calm Bulgarian concerns, the MRF categorically renounced Islamic fundamentalism, terrorism, and ambitions for autonomy within Bulgaria.

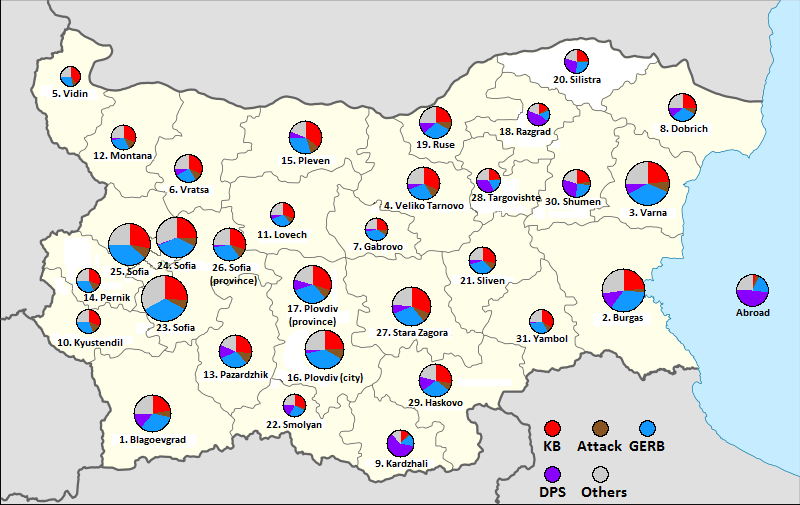
2013 Parliamentary election, distribution of votes by constituency (Movement for Rights and Freedoms in purple)

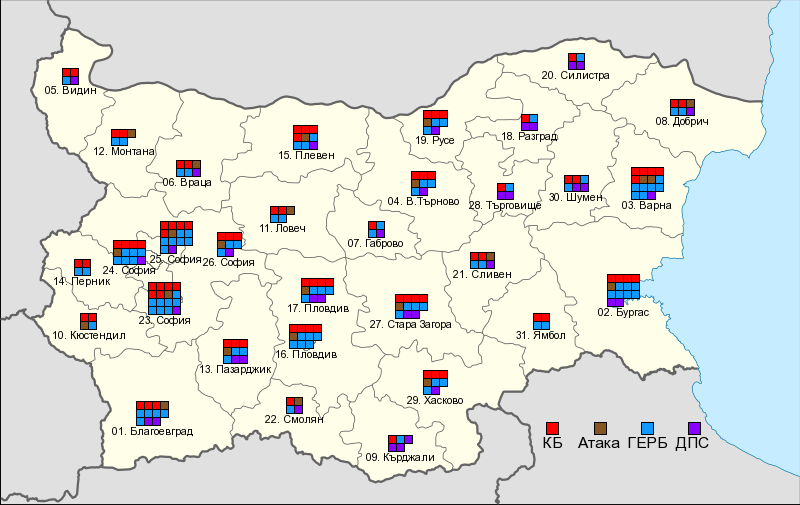
Distribution of seats by constituency from the election

In the first general elections in 1990 after the communist regime which the Muslims boycotted, the party won 6.0% of the popular vote and 24 out of 400 seats and became the fourth largest party in the parliament. In the parliamentary elections in 1991 it won 7.6% of the vote and remained with 24 seats in а 240-seat parliament. In the elections in 1994 it won 5.4% of the vote and its seats decreased to 15. In the elections in 1997 it won 7.6% of the vote and 19 out of 240 seats. It won in the elections in 2001 7.5% of the vote and 21 out of 240 seats. Subsequently, for the first time the party joined a coalition government, which was led by the winner of the elections (NDSV). Under the control of the party were 2 out of 17 Bulgarian ministries – the Ministry of Agriculture and Forests and the Minister without portfolio, the rest 15 remained under the control of NDSV.

At the 2005 elections it increased to 12.8% of vote and 34 out of 240 seats and kept in power as a part of the coalition led by the BSP and NDSV party. The ministries under the control of the Movement of Rights and Freedoms increased to 3 out of 18. In the budget of 2008, MRF directed a large parts of the subsidies for agriculture to tobacco growers (which are predominantly Turks, Pomaks, and Romani) leaving staple crops, like wheat, without subsidies for buying the seed for sowing. This evoked protests by farmers in the regions of Vratsa, Knezha, and Dobrudzha.

At the 2009 elections it increased to 14.0% of vote and 37 out of 240 seats. Following the election, the government was totally occupied by the decisive winner, the Citizens for European Development of Bulgaria party and the Movement for Rights and Freedoms returned to opposition after being part of coalition governments two consecutive terms between 2001 and 2009. At the 2009 European Parliament elections the party won 14.1% of the vote and 3 MEPs out of 18. Two of the MEPs are ethnic Turks (Filiz Husmenova and Metin Kazak) and one (Vladko Panayotov) is ethnic Bulgarian.

According to exit polls of the Bulgarian parliamentary election in 2013, the Movement for Rights and Freedoms gained 11.3% of the vote, it keeps 36 seats and remains the third largest voting bloc. The party won the elections in five regions where the Muslim population resides – Kardzhali, Razgrad, Silistra, Targovishte and Shumen provinces; the party also wins abroad with 49% of the vote, in general the most polling stations and voters in a foreign country wherever were in Turkey, from where the party included 50,000 votes more to its result of 350,000 votes. Another Turkish party, founded in 2011 and headed by Korman Ismailov – People's Party Freedom and Dignity (PPFD) in a coalition with NDSV won 1.531% of the vote and therefore did not cross the 4% threshold to enter the parliament. Another political party founded in 1998 and representing a smaller fraction of the Turkish minority in Bulgaria is the National Movement for Rights and Freedoms (NMRF), which do not participate in the parliamentary elections. The party is headed by Güner Tahir and has on several occasions formed an alliance with the MRF during nationwide local elections. During the 1999 local elections the NMRF gained some 80 000 votes.

== Toponymy ==
Over 3200 locations in Bulgaria are also known by some Turks in their Turkish names.

Bulgarian Name	Turkish Name	Comments
Aksakovo	Acemler	
Ardino	Eğridere	
Aitos	Aydos	From Greek Αετός
Beloslav	Gebece	
Belovets	Sırtalan	Village in Razgrad Province
Blagoevgrad	Yukarı Cuma	
Botevgrad	Orhaniye	
Burgas	Burgaz	
Chiflik	Çiftlik	
Dalgopol	Yeni-Köy	
Devin	Devlen	
Devnya	Devne	
Dobrich	Hacıoğlu Pazarcık	
Dolni Chiflik	Aşağı Çiftlik	
Dulovo	Akkadınlar	
Dzhebel	Cebel	
Golyamo Tsarkvishte (village)	Küçük Tekeler	Küçük means small translated as Golyamo which means large. Tekeler was evolved from Tekkeler which means Dervish convent to Tsarkvishte which means church.
Gotse Delchev (town)	Nevrekop	Nevrekop was old name of Gotse Delchev, from Greek Νευροκόπι
Haskovo	Hasköy	
Harmanli	Harmanlı	
Hitrino	Şeytancık	
Isperih	Kemallar	
Iglika	Kalaycı	
Ivaylovgrad	Ortaköy	
Kadievo	Kadıköy	
Kameno	Kayalı	
Kalimantsi	Gevrekler	
Kaolinovo	Bohçalar	
Kardzhali	Kırcaali	
Kaspichan	Kaspiçan	
Kaynardzha	Küçük Kaynarca	
Kazanlak	Kızanlık	
Krumovgrad	Koşukavak	The name derives from "koşu": running, and "kavak": poplar, horse races on a poplar-grown course
Kubrat (town)	Kurtbunar	
Loznitsa	Kubadın	
Lovech	Lofça	
Mihailovski	Kaykı	
Momchilgrad	Mestanlı	
Nikola Kozlevo	Civel, Tavşankozlucası	
Novi Pazar, Bulgaria	Yeni Pazar	
Omurtag (town)	Osman Pazar	
Pazardzhik	Tatar Pazarcık	
Pleven	Plevne	
Plovdiv	Filibe	Named after Alexander the Great's father Philip II of Macedon in ancient times this city was also known as Philippopolis.
Popovo	Pop Köy	
Potochnitsa	Ada	
Provadiya	Prevadi	
Razgrad	Hezargrad	
Rousse	Rusçuk	
Ruen	Ulanlı	
Samuil (village)	Işıklar	
Shumen	Şumnu	
Silistra	Silistre	
Sliven	İslimye	
Slivo Pole	Kaşıklar	
Sokolartsi, Kotel Province	Duvancilar	
Stara Zagora	Eski Zağra	
Svilengrad	Cisri Mustafa Paşa	
Suvorovo	Kozluca	
Targovishte	Eski Cuma	
Tervel (town)	Kurt Bunar	
Topolovgrad	Kavaklı	
Topuzovo, Kotel Province	Topuzlar	
Tsar Kaloyan, Razgrad Province	Torlak	
Tsenovo, Rousse Province	Çauşköy	
Valchi Dol	Kurt-Dere	
Veliki Preslav	Eski İstanbulluk	
Venets, Shumen Province	Köklüce	
Vetovo	Vetova, Vet-Ova	
Vetrino	Yasa-Tepe	
Zavet (town)	Zavut	
Zlatograd	Darıdere	
Zhivkovo	Kızılkaya	
Buzludzha	Buzluca	Peak in the Central Stara Planina
Bulgaranovo	Kademler	Villages in Omurtag region
Veselets	Yagcilar	Villages in Omurtag region
Borimechkovo	Yörükler	Village in Pazardzhik region. In the aftermath of the Russo-Turkish War of 1877-78 returning refugees from four burned villages (Cafarli, Duvanli, Okçullu, and Oruçlu) settled in Okçullu which became known as Yörükler.
Dobrudja	Babadag	Deriving from Baba Sari Saltik
Hainboaz	Hain-Boğaz	Hainboaz mountain pass, known in Bulgaria as the Pass of the Republic
Stara Planina	Koca Balkan	Literally meaning "Great Mountain" this is the mountain that gives its name to the entire region and the Balkan Peninsula. Its Bulgarian name means "Old Mountain".
Sredna Gora	Orta Balkan	Literally means "Middle Mountain".

== Literature ==
Bulgarian Turks have produced perhaps the most substantial amount of literature in the Turkish language outside Turkey.

The list of noted writers includes:

- Aşık Hıfzi
- Hüseyin Raci Efendi
- Ali Osman Ayrantok
- Mehmet Müzekka Con
- İzzet Dinç
- Mustafa Serit Alyanak
- Muharrem Yumuk Mehmet
- Behçet Perim
- Ali Kemal Balkanlı
- Lütfi Erçin
- Osman Kesikoğlu
- Mehmet Fikri
- Oğuz Peltek
- Mehmet Muradov
- Selim Bilalov
- Osman Kılıç
- Riza Mollov
- Mustafa Kahveciev
- Nuri Turgut Adalı
- Yusuf Kerimov
- Kemal Bunarciev
- Salih Baklacıev
- Süleyman Gavazov
- Hasan Karahüseyinov
- Sabri Tatov
- Ahmet Timisev
- Hüseyin Oğuz
- Ahmet Şerifov
- Mülazim Çavuşev
- Mefkure Mollova
- Niyazi Hüseyinov
- Lütfi Demirov
- Muharrem Tahsinov
- Mehmet Bekirov
- İshak Raşidov
- Nadiye Ahmedova
- Sabahattin Bayramov
- Halit Aliosmanov
- Mehmet Sansarov
- İslam Beytullov
- Ismail Çavusev
- Turhan Rasiev
- Ismail Yakubov
- Naci Ferhadov
- Mukaddes Akmonova – Saidova
- Yasar Gafur
- Ali Boncuk
- Ahmet Mehmedov
- Isa Cebeciev
- Mustafa Aladag
- Ahmet Eminov
- Ibrahim Kamberoglu
- İsmail Bekirov
- Mehmet Davudov
- Hüsmen İsmailov
- Kazım Memişev
- İsmail İbişev
- Mehmet Çavuşev
- Muhammet Yusufov
- Yusuf Ahmedov
- Recep Küpçü
- Nevzat Mehmedov
- Ömer Osmanov
- Ali Bayramov
- Latif Aliev
- Mustafa Mutkov
- Ali Kadirov
- Halim Halilibrahimov
- Faik İsmailov
- Ali Pirov
- Mustafa Çetev
- Süleyman Yusufov
- Durhan Hasanov
- Mehmet Memov
- Nazmi Nuriev
- Osman Azizov
- Sabri İbrahimov
- Ali Durmuşev
- Alis Saidov
- Fehim Şentürk
- Fevzi Kadirov
- Saban Mahmudov
- Sahin Mustafaov
- Latif Karagöz
- Kadir Osmanov
- Mustafa Ömer Asi
- Ahmet Aptiev
- Necmiye Mehmedova
- Lamia Varnalı
- Ahmet Aliev
- Nevzat Yakubov
- İsmet Bayramov
- Nebiye İbrahimova
- Ahmet Kadirov
- Avni Veliev
- Arzu Tahirova
- Durhan Aliev
- Saffet Eren
- Emine Hocova
- Aysel İsmailova Süleymanova
- Kadriye Cesur
- Nafize Habip
- Naim Bakoğlu
- Beyhan Nalbantov
- Ali Tiryaki
- Fatma Hüseyin

== Language ==
There are two main dialects; the first one is spoken in every area in south-east Bulgaria and is also used in the neighbouring countries (Greece and Turkey). It can be identified from the second one by looking at the "present continuous time"; it has the suffix forms -yirin, -yisin, -yiri. In formal Turkish they are -yorum, -yorsun, -yor. In the second dialect, used near Kurdzhali, the forms are; -værin, -væsin, -væri.

== See also ==
- Bulgaria–Turkey relations
- Bulgarian Turks in Turkey
- Tatars in Bulgaria
- Islam in Bulgaria
- List of Bulgarian Turks
- Turkish minorities in the former Ottoman Empire
- Turks in the Balkans
- Turks in Europe
- Razgrad Incident

== Bibliography ==
- Ahmet Erdi Öztürk and Semiha Sözeri, "Diyanet as a Turkish Foreign Policy Tool: Evidence from the Netherlands and Bulgaria", Politics and Religion, Volume 11, Issue, September 2018, pp. 624–648
- Bulgarian Helsinki Committee, The Human Rights of Muslims in Bulgaria in Law and Politics since 1878, 2003
- Bulgarian Olympic Committee
- Can, T. & Todorov, . M.S., Turks of Bulgaria: Assimilation Policy and Linguistic Oppression, 2004, Syracuse University
- Crampton, R.J., Bulgaria: 1878–1918, A History, 1983, East European Monographs ISBN 0-88033-029-5
- Crampton, R.J., A History of Modern Bulgaria, 1987, Cambridge University Press ISBN 0-521-25340-3
- Crampton, R.J., A Concise History of Bulgaria, 1997, Cambridge University Press ISBN 0-521-56719-X
- Eminov, A., Turkish and Other Muslim Minorities of Bulgaria, 1997, Routledge ISBN 0-415-91976-2
- Hupchick, D.P., The Balkans: From Constantinople to Communism, 2002, Palgrave ISBN 1-4039-6417-3
- Kaplan, R.D., Balkan Ghosts: A Journey Through History, 1994, Vintage Departures
- Kamusella, Tomasz. 2018.Ethnic Cleansing During the Cold War: The Forgotten 1989 Expulsion of Bulgaria's Turks (Ser: Routledge Studies in Modern European History). London: Routledge, 328pp. ISBN 9781138480520
- Maeva, M. New Migration Waves of Bulgarian Turks. In: Marushiakova, E. (ed.): Dynamics of National Identity and Transnational Identities in the Process of European Integration. Cambridge Publ. 2007. pp. 224–247 ISBN 1-84718-471-5
- Maeva, M. Arabic Language and Bulgarian Turks, Еmigrants in Turkey. – In: Theophanov, Tz. and al. (eds.). 30 Years of Arabic and Islamic Studies in Bulgaria. Sofia, University Press St. Kl. Ohridski, 2008, pp. 161–170 ISBN 978-954-07-2867-4, ISBN 954-07-2867-3
- McCarthy, J., Death and Exile: The Ethnic Cleansing of Ottoman Muslims, 1821–1922, 1996, Darwin Press ISBN 0-87850-094-4
- Nicole, D., Attila and the Huns, 1990, Osprey Publishing
- Petkova, L., "The Ethnic Turks in Bulgaria: Social Integration and Impact on Bulgarian–Turkish Relations, 1947–2000", The Global Review of Ethnopolitics Vol. 1, no. 4, June 2002, 42–59
- Peykovska, P. The Current Demographic Statistics of the Population in Bulgaria on the Exodus of Bulgarian Turks in the 1930s to 1943. – In: Archives and History: Interrelations and Perspectives. Ed. A. Kochankova. Sofia, 2020, 151–159. (In Bulg. lang.)
- Runciman, Steven (1930). A History of the First Bulgarian Empire. G. Bell & Sons, London. Archived from the original on 13 December 2007 – via Questia.
- A Country Study: Bulgaria – Ethnographic Characteristics (Turks) (Data as of 1992)
- Yalamov, I., The History of the Turkish Community in Bulgaria (in Bulgarian), 2002, ISBN 954-711-024-1
