= Armenians in the Ottoman Empire =

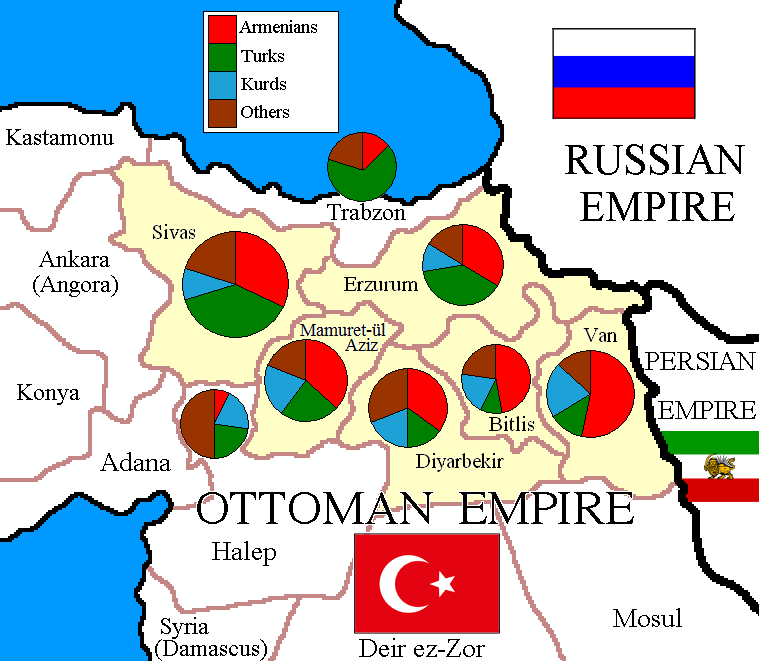
Ethnic map of six Armenian vilayets in the Ottoman Empire according to available information.

Armenians were a significant minority in the Ottoman Empire. They belonged to either the Armenian Apostolic Church, the Armenian Catholic Church, or the Armenian Protestant Church, each church serving as the basis of a millet. They played a crucial role in Ottoman industry and commerce, and Armenian communities existed in almost every major city of the empire. The majority of the Armenian population made up a reaya, or peasant class, in Western Armenia. Since the latter half the 19th century, the Armenians of the Ottoman Empire sought more autonomy and protection in what was part of the Armenian Question. Armenians were persecuted by Ottoman authorities and their Kemalist successors, especially from the latter half of the 19th century, culminating in the Armenian genocide.

== Background ==
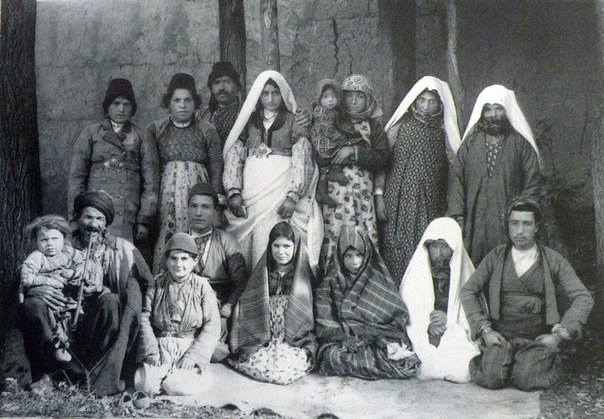
Local Van Armenians

In the Byzantine Empire, the Armenian Church was not allowed to operate in Constantinople (Istanbul), because the Greek Orthodox Church regarded the Armenian Church as heretical. The Ottoman Turks early on encountered Armenians, and their conquest of Constantinople gave them legitimacy in ruling over them. Armenians were thus governed as dhimmis, or People of the Book, in the Ottoman legal system. At first, the Sultan was the highest power in the land and had control over almost everything. However, a state organization began to take a more definite shape in the first half of the sixteenth century under Suleiman I. The Ottomans allowed the establishment of an Armenian Patriarchate to govern the Armenian people. This meant the beginning of the Armenian millet: a millet being a confessional community under Ottoman protection which was allowed to govern itself using its own religious laws.

Ottoman legal theory understood two separate "establishments" to share state power, one responsible for governing a nation's citizens and the other its military. In addition, Islam did not separate religious and secular matters. Armenians were administered by the civil administration. In the Ottoman Empire, townspeople, villagers, and farmers formed a class called the reaya, including Armenians. Civil and judicial administration was carried out under a separate parallel system of small municipal or rural units called kazas. The civil system was considered a check on the military system, since beys, who represented executive authority on reaya, could not carry out justice without a sanction from the religious leader of the person's faith. Armenians became religious leaders and bureaucrats under the Ottoman Empire, allowing them to become more influential than just in their own community.

During the Ottoman period, Armenian communities expanded in western Asia Minor, particularly in the region around the Sea of Marmara and Constantinople. According to Richard G. Hovannisian and Armen Manuk-Khaloyan, the Armenian presence in this region dated to the Byzantine period and grew substantially during the sixteenth and seventeenth centuries amid the Ottoman–Safavid wars and the upheavals caused by the Jelali rebellions. By the nineteenth century, the region contained more than a hundred Armenian settlements, many of which maintained churches, schools, and cultural associations. Armenian communities also became active in agriculture, handicrafts, commerce, and particularly silk and textile production, while some settlements developed into important centers of Armenian education and religious life.

== Role of Armenians in the Ottoman economy ==
Certain elite Armenian families in the Ottoman Empire gained the trust of the Sultans and were able to achieve important positions in the Ottoman government and the Ottoman economy. Even though their numbers were small compared to the whole Ottoman Armenian population, this caused some resentment among Ottoman nationalists.

Those elite Armenians that did achieve great success were individuals such as Abraham Pasha, and Gabriel Noradunkyan who became Minister of Foreign Affairs. The Dadian family were granted a monopoly over gunpowder production, putting them in a key position in the munitions industry of the Ottoman Empire. Calouste Gulbenkian became one of the main advisors of the National Bank of Turkey and the Turkish Petroleum Corporation, which later became the Iraqi Oil Corporation.

Historian A. Tchamkerten writes "Armenian achievements in the Empire were not only in trade, however. They were involved in almost all economic sectors and held the highest levels of responsibility. In the 19th century, various Armenian families became the Sultan's goldsmiths, Sultan's architects and took over the currency reserves and the reserves of gold and silver, including customs duty. Sixteen of the eighteen most important bankers in the Ottoman Empire were Armenian".

Ottoman Armenians were over-represented in commerce. As middleman minorities, despite the wealth of some Armenians, their overall political power was low, making them especially vulnerable.

=== Patriarchate of Constantinople ===
After Constantinople fell to the Ottoman Turks in 1453, the Armenian Patriarchate was established to govern the Apostolic faithful living in the Ottoman Empire. Hovagim I was brought to Constantinople by Sultan Mehmed II and established the Armenian Patriarchate of Constantinople. As the influence of the Constantinople Patriarchate surpassed that of the Catholicos of Etchmiadzin, this shifted the center of Armenian ecclesiastical and national life from Etchmiadzin (and Sis) to Constantinople. It is theorized that no Armenian churches existed in Constantinople before the Ottoman conquest, but after 1453, 55 Armenian churches were built.

Until the promulgation of the Edict of Gülhane in 1839, the patriarch, within limits, possessed penal authority over the Armenian people. At the capital, the patriarchate had its own jail and maintained a small police force. Its authority over the clergy being absolute, the patriarch could imprison or exile Armenians at will; and while they were compelled to secure the consent of the Sultan to imprison or exile laymen of their community, the necessary firman was easily obtained. This system of government, in placing civil powers in the hands of high ecclesiastics, was allowed by the Sultanate which made no distinction between church and community, and often lent the weight of its authority to maintain the integrity of the church.

=== Armenian village life ===
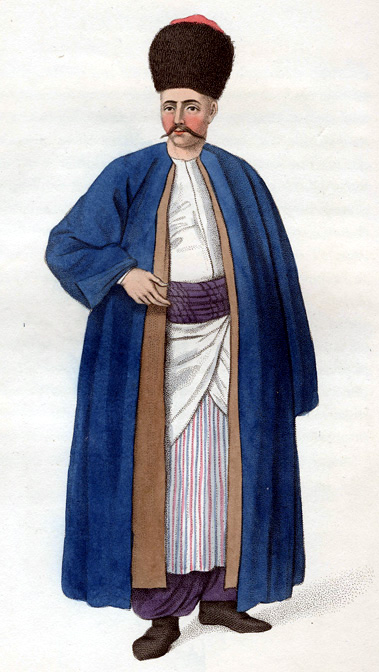
An "Armenian bey", the executive authority on Armenian reaya. The bey was part of civil administration.

The Bey or elder was something of a leader for the village, and their house was typically the most luxurious dwelling in a village. It was not uncommon to have three priests for thirty-five families. Most Armenians traveled on horseback to neighbouring villages, sometimes for religious ceremonies (like the Van festival), sometimes to fetch a bride, accompanying her, with musical instruments and clapping of hands, to their own village.

== Ottoman Armenia: 1453–1829 ==
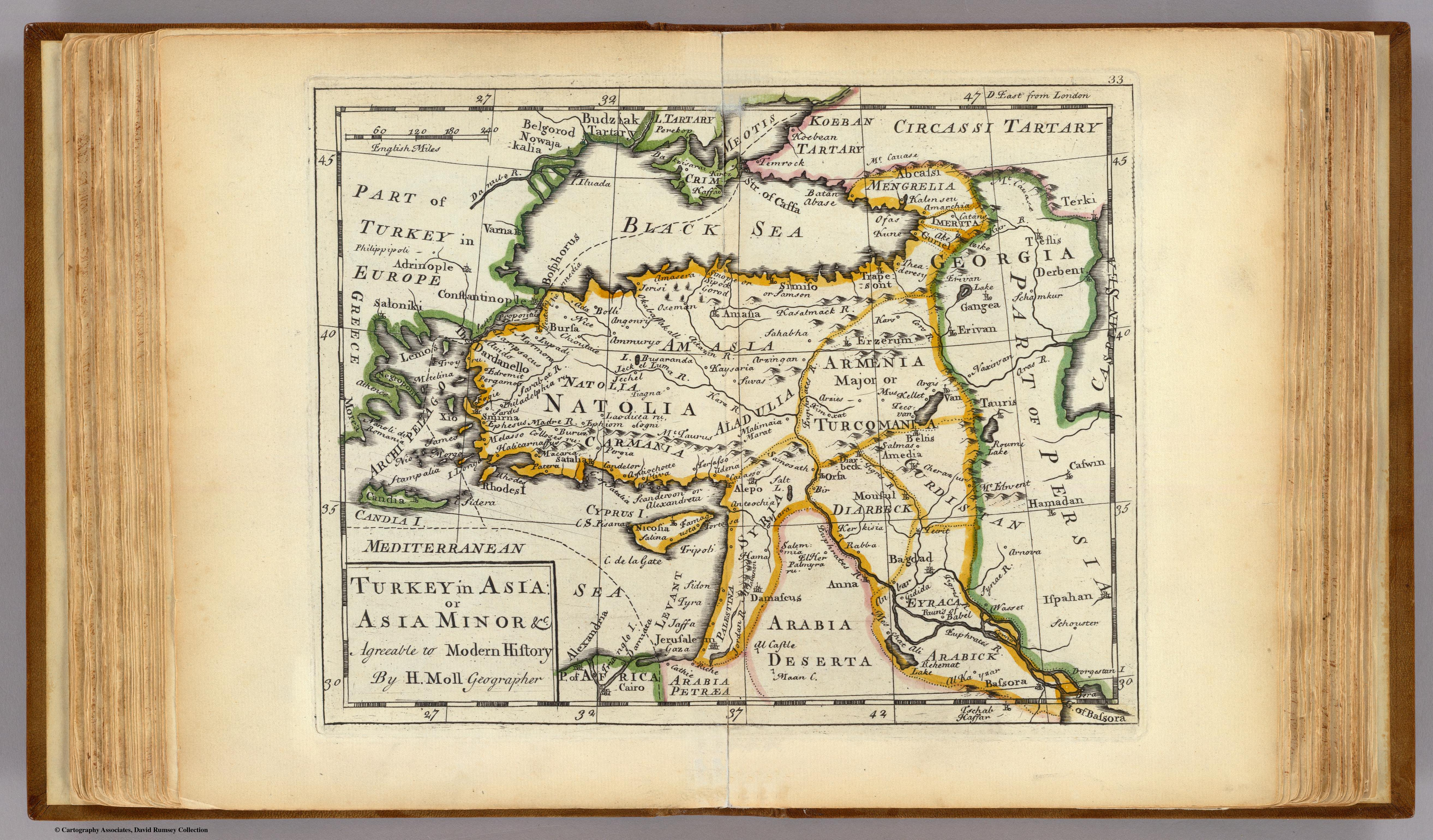
Western Armenia in the first half of the 18th century. Herman Moll's map, 1736

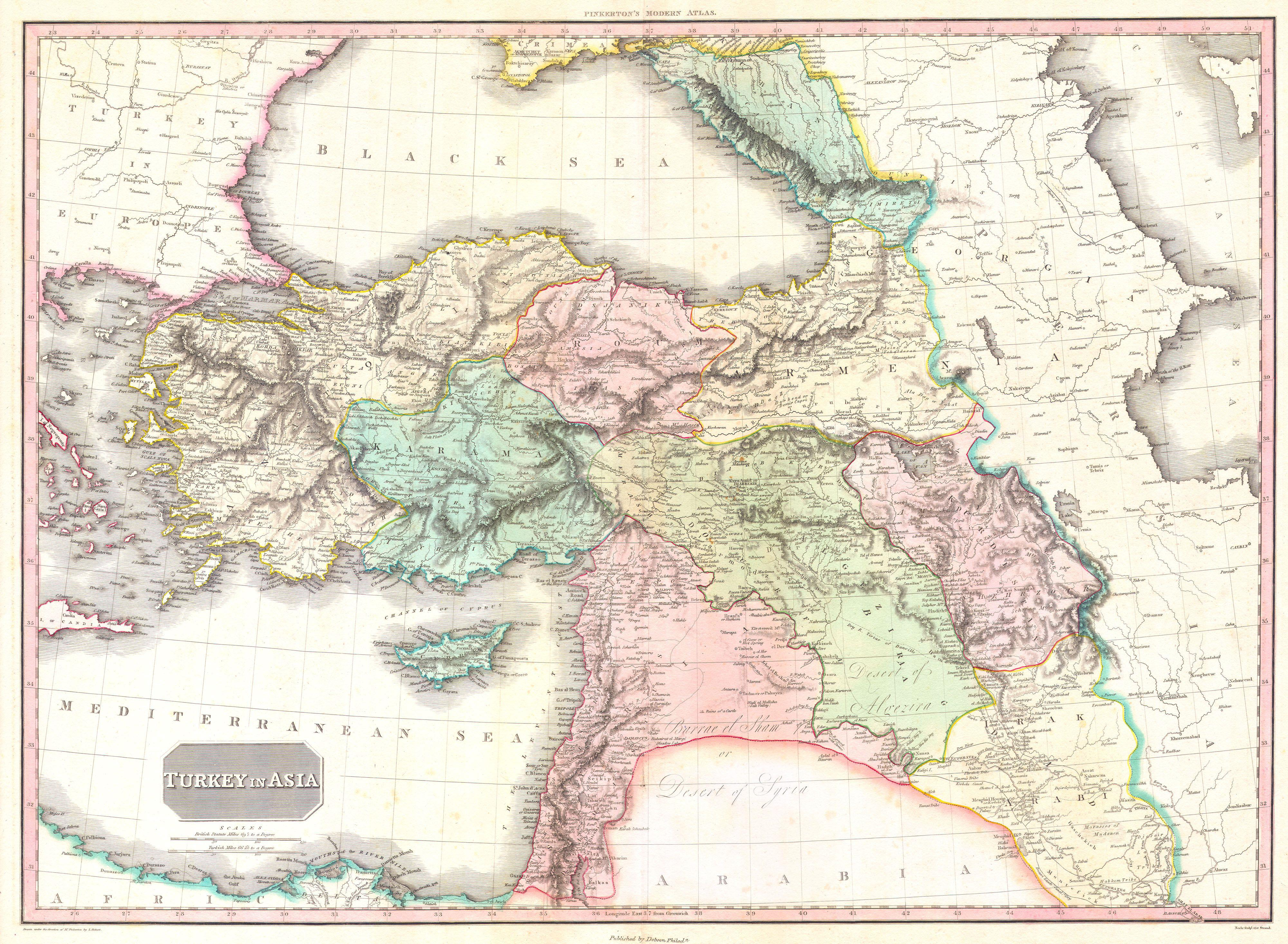
Western Armenia on the Ottoman Empire map. John Pinkerton, 1818

Armenians preserved their culture, history, and language through the course of time, largely thanks to their distinct religious identity among the neighboring Turks and Kurds. Like the Greek Orthodox and Jewish minorities of the Ottoman Empire, they constituted a distinct millet. Under this system, non-Muslims were considered second-class citizens; they were subjected to elevated taxation, but in return they were granted autonomy within their own religious communities and were exempted from military service. Growing religious and political influence from neighboring communities necessitated implementation of security measures that often required a longer waiting period for minorities to seek Legal recourse in the courts. Under Ottoman rule, Armenians formed three distinct millets: Armenian Orthodox Gregorians, Armenian Catholics, and Armenian Protestants (in the 19th century).

After many centuries of Turkish rule in Anatolia and Armenia (at first by the Seljuks, then a variety of Anatolian beyliks and finally the Ottomans), the centres with a high concentration of Armenians lost their geographic continuity (parts of Van, Bitlis, and Kharput vilayets). Over the centuries, tribes of Turks and Kurds settled into Anatolia and Armenia, which was left severely depopulated by a slew of devastating events such as the Byzantine-Persian Wars, Byzantine-Arab Wars, Turkish migration, Mongol Invasions and finally the campaigns of Tamerlane.

In addition, there were the century-long Ottoman-Persian Wars between the rival empires, the battlegrounds of which ranged over Western Armenia, causing the region and its peoples to be passed between the Ottomans and Persians numerous times. The wars between the arch-rivals started from the early 16th century and lasted till well into the 19th century, having disastrous effects for the native inhabitants of these regions, including the Armenians of Western Armenia.

Owing to these events, the demographic representation of Armenians in their ancient homeland decreased to a quarter of the total inhabitants. Despite this, they kept and defended de facto autonomy in certain isolated areas like Sasun, Shatakh (Çatak), and parts of Dersim (Tunceli). An Armenian stronghold and a symbol of factual Armenian autonomy, Zeitoun (Ulnia) was located between the Six Vilayets and Cilicia, which also had a strong Armenian presence since the creation of the Kingdom of Lesser Armenia. However, the destruction of the Kingdom by the Ramadanids and the subsequent rule by Muslim powers such as the Dulkadirids, the Mamluks, and the Ottomans led to ever increasing numbers of Muslims in the region. After the Ottoman conquests many Armenians also moved west and settled in Anatolia, in large and prosperous Ottoman cities like Constantinople and Smyrna (İzmir).

== Ottoman Armenia: 1829–1878 ==
The remaining Ottoman Armenia, composed of the Six vilayets (Erzurum, Van, Bitlis, Diyarbekir, Kharput, and Sivas) up to World War I, under Ottoman rule, was also referred to as Western Armenia. There were also significant communities in parts of Trebizond and Ankara vilayets bordering Six Vilayets (such as in Kayseri).

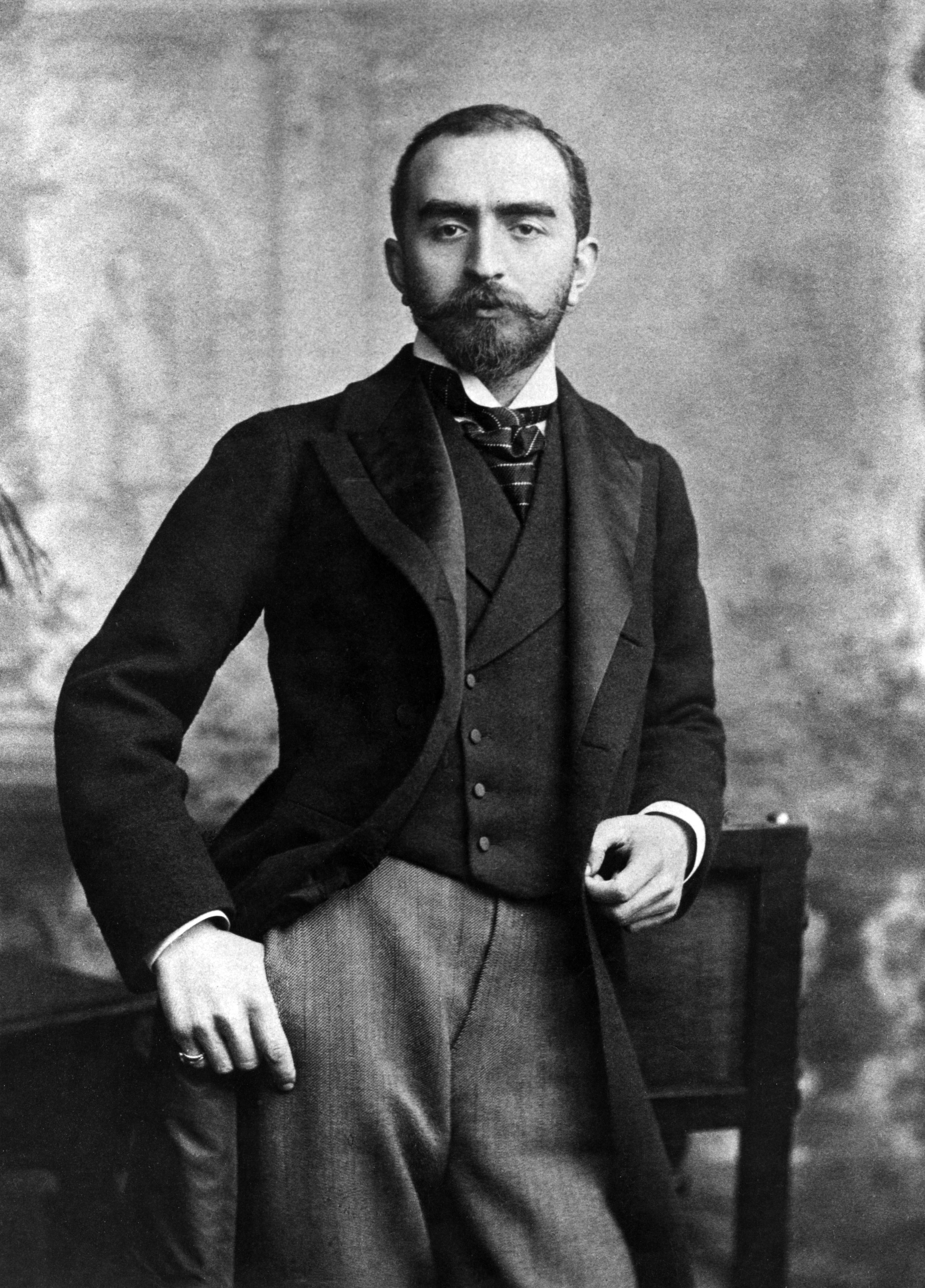
Calouste Gulbenkian, businessman and philanthropist born in 1869 at Üsküdar

Aside from the learned professions taught at the schools that had opened throughout the Ottoman Empire, the chief occupations of Armenian Ottomans were trade and commerce, industry, and agriculture. In the empire, Armenians were raised to higher occupations, like Calouste Sarkis Gulbenkian was a businessman and philanthropist. He played a major role in making the petroleum reserves of the Middle East available to Western development. The Armenian Press and literature during this period established institutions that were critical; this attitude has been invaluable in reforming abuses and introducing improvements in Armenian communities. Thus their critical instinct was positive, rather than negative. Armenians organized themselves into civil society organizations, including clubs and political parties. Hovsep Pushman was a painter who became very famous in the Empire. During this period Armenians would establish churches, schools, libraries, and newspapers. Sargis Mubayeajian was a prolific and multifarious writer educated in Constantinople. Many of his works are still scattered in Armenian periodicals.

Many Armenians, who after having emigrated to foreign countries and becoming prosperous there, returned to their native land. Alex Manoogian, who became a philanthropist and active member of the Armenian General Benevolent Union was from Smyrna (İzmir), and Arthur Edmund Carewe, born Trebizond, become an actor in the silent film era.

=== Eastern Question ===
The Eastern Question (normally dated to 1774) refers to the diplomatic and political problems posed by the decline of the Ottoman Empire during the 18th century; including instability in the territories ruled by the Ottoman Empire. The position of educated and privileged Christians within the Ottoman Empire improved in the 17th and 18th centuries, and the Ottomans increasingly recognized the missing skills which the larger Ottoman population lacked, and as the empire became more settled it began to feel its increasing backwardness in relation to the European powers. European powers on the other side, engaged in a power struggle to safeguard their strategic and commercial interests in the Empire, this gave motivation to the powers to help people in need. The rise of nationalism under the Ottoman Empire was a direct result of enlightenment of Christian millets through education. Armenians, for the most part, remained passive during these years, earning them the title of millet-i sadıka or the "loyal millet".

The Eastern Question gained even more traction by the late 1820s, due to the Greek Enlightenment and Greek War of Independence setting an example of non-Muslims gaining independence against the Ottoman Empire. Russia stood to benefit from the decline of the Ottoman Empire; on the other hand, Austria and the United Kingdom deemed the preservation of Empire to be in their best interests. The position of France changed several times over the centuries. Armenian involvement on the international stage would have to wait until the Armenian national awakening, which the Armenian Question, as used in European history, became commonplace among diplomatic circles and in the popular press after the Congress of Berlin (1878). While Armenian nationalism developed later than Greek nationalism, the two movements share more similarities than those of other ethnic groups.

=== Reform implementation, 1860s–1880s ===
The Great Powers Great Britain, France and Russia took issue with the Ottoman Empire's treatment of its Christian minorities and increasingly pressured the Sublime Porte to extend equal rights to all its citizens.

Beginning in 1839, the Ottoman government implemented the Tanzimat reforms, among its many goals to improve the situation of non-Muslim minorities, although these would prove largely ineffective. In 1856, the Imperial Reform Edict promised equality for all Ottoman citizens irrespective of their ethnicity and confession, widening the scope of the 1839 Edict of Gülhane. The reformist period peaked with a Constitution written by members of the Young Ottomans, which was promulgated on 23 November 1876. It established freedom of belief and equality of all citizens before the law. "Firman of the Reforms" gave immense privileges to the Armenians, which formed a "governance in governance" to eliminate the aristocratic dominance of the Armenian nobles by development of the political strata in the society.

The Armenian Question, a derivative of the Eastern Question, became a common place among diplomatic circles and in the popular press after the Congress of Berlin (1878).

==== Armenian National Constitution, 1863 ====
In 1863, the Armenian National Constitution was promulgated. It was a form of a "Code of Regulations," composed of 150 articles drafted by the Armenian intelligentsia, which defined the powers of the Patriarch, the newly formed Armenian National Assembly, and the rights and privileges of Armenians in the Ottoman Empire. Patriarch Mikrtich issued a decree permitting women to have equal votes with men and asking them to take part in all elections.

The Armenian National Assembly had wide-ranging functions. Muslim officials were not employed to collect taxes in Armenian villages, but the taxes in all the Armenian villages were to be collected by Armenian tax-collectors appointed by the Armenian National Assembly. Armenians were allowed to establish their own courts of justice for the purpose of administering justice and conducting litigation between Armenians, and for deciding all questions relating to marriage, divorce, estate, inheritance, etc., appertaining to themselves. Also Armenians were allowed the right to establish their own prisons for the incarceration of offending Armenians, and in no case should an Armenian be imprisoned in an Ottoman prison.

The Armenian National Assembly also had the power to elect the Armenian Governor by a local Armenian legislative council. The councils later will be part of elections during Second Constitutional Era. Local Armenian legislative councils were composed of six Armenians elected by the Armenian National Assembly.

==== Education and social work ====
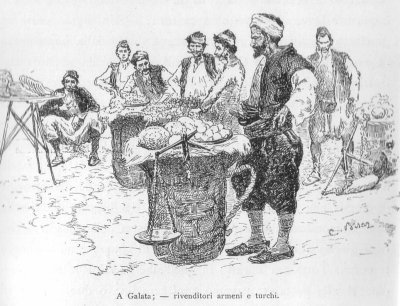
Armenian & Turkish Retailers.

Beginning in 1863, education was available to all subjects, as far as funds permitted it. Such education was under the direction of lay committees. During this period in Russian Armenia, the association of the schools with the Church was close, but the same principle obtains. This became a problem for the Russian administration, which peaked during 1897 when Tsar Nicholas II appointed the Armenophobic Grigory Sergeyevich Golitsin as governor of Transcaucasia, and Armenian schools, cultural associations, newspapers and libraries were closed.

The Armenian charitable works, hospitals, and provident institutions were organized along the explained perspective. The Armenians, in addition to paying taxes to the state, voluntarily imposed extra burdens on themselves in order to support these philanthropic agencies. The taxes to the State did not have direct return to Armenians in such cases.

== National awakening: 1880s ==
The national liberation movement of the Balkan peoples (see: national awakenings in Balkans) and the immediate involvement of the European powers in the Eastern question had a powerful effect on the hitherto suppressed national movement among the Armenians of the Ottoman Empire – on the development of a national liberation ideology. The Armenian national liberation movement was the Armenian national effort to free the historic Armenian homeland of eastern Asia Minor and Transcaucasus from Ottoman and Csarist rule and re-establish the independent Armenian state. Those Armenians who did not support national liberation aspirations or who were neutral were called chezoks.

Abdul Hamid II was the 34th Sultan and oversaw a period of decline in the power and extent of the Empire, ruling from 31 August 1876 until he was deposed on 27 April 1909. He was the last Ottoman Sultan to rule with absolute power.

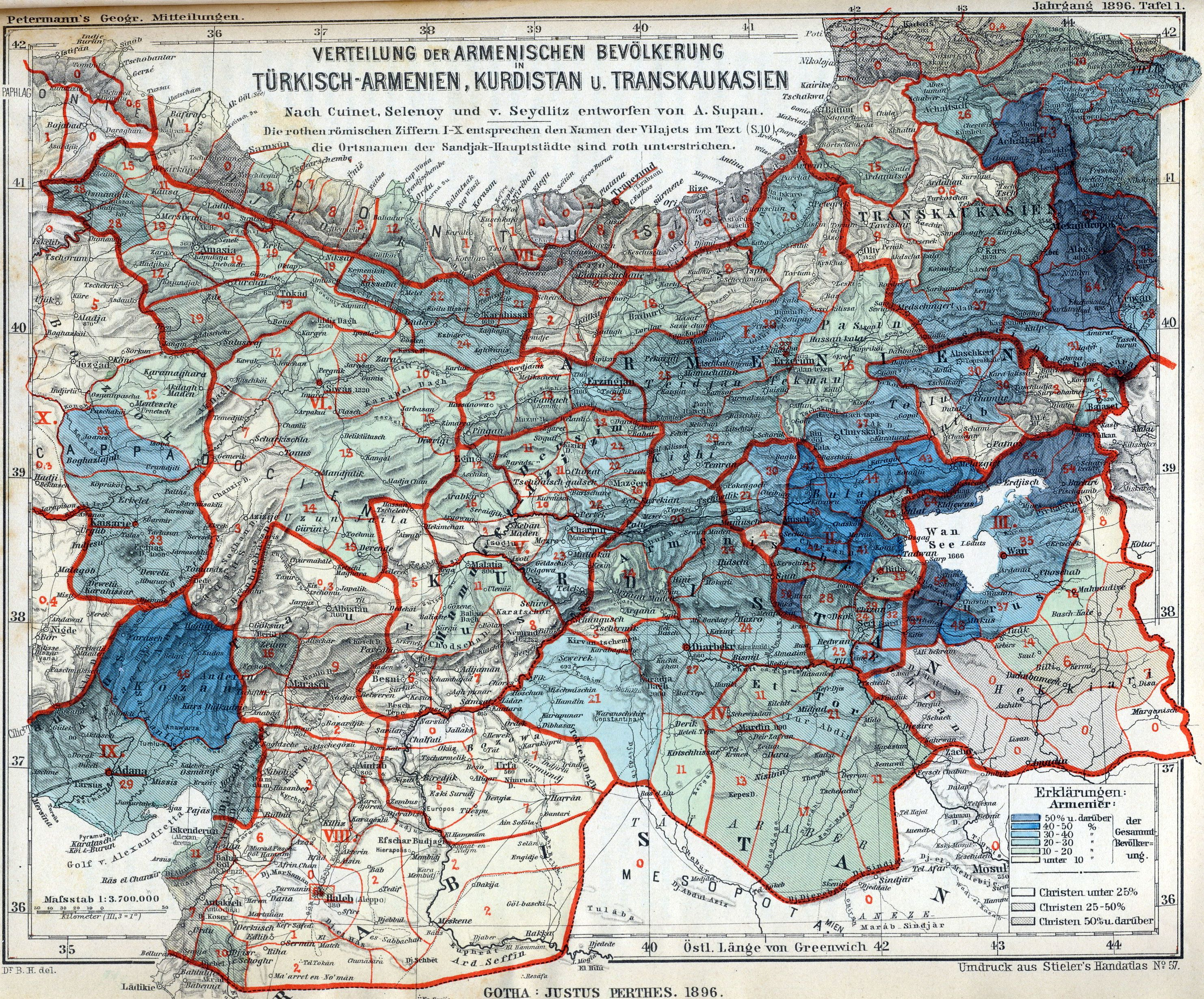
1896, Armenian-populated regions.

=== Bashkaleh clash: 1889 ===
The Bashkaleh clash was the bloody encounter between the Armenakan Party and the Ottoman Empire in May 1889. Its name comes from Başkale, a border town of Van Eyalet of the Ottoman Empire. The event was important, as it was reflected in main Armenian newspapers as the recovered documents on the Armenakans showed an extensive plot for a national movement. Ottoman officials believed that the men were members of a large revolutionary apparatus and the discussion was reflected on newspapers, (Eastern Express, Oriental Advertiser, Saadet, and Tarik) and the responses were on the Armenian papers. In some Armenian circles, this event was considered as a martyrdom and brought other armed conflicts. The Bashkaleh Resistance was on the Persian border, which the Armenakans were in communication with Armenians in the Persian Empire. The Gugunian Expedition, which followed within the couple months, was an attempt by a small group of Armenian nationalists from the Russian Armenia to launch an armed expedition across the border into the Ottoman Empire in 1890 in support of local Armenians.

=== Kum Kapu demonstration: 1890 ===
The Kum Kapu demonstration occurred at the Armenian quarter of Kumkapı, the seat of the Armenian Patriarch, who was spared through the prompt action of the commandant, Hassan Aga. On 27 July 1890, Harutiun Jangülian, Mihran Damadian and Hambartsum Boyajian interrupted the Divine Liturgy to read a manifesto and denounce the indifference of the Armenian patriarch and Armenian National Assembly to national liberation. Jangülian then tried to assassinate the Patriarch. The goal was to persuade the Armenian clerics to bring their policies into alignment with the national politics. They soon forced the patriarch to join a procession heading to the Yildiz Palace to demand implementation of Article 61 of the Treaty of Berlin. It is significant that this massacre, in which 6000 Armenians are said to have perished, was not the result of a general rising of the Muslim population. The Softas took no part in it, and many Armenians found refuge in the Muslim sections of the city.

=== Bloody years: 1894–96 ===
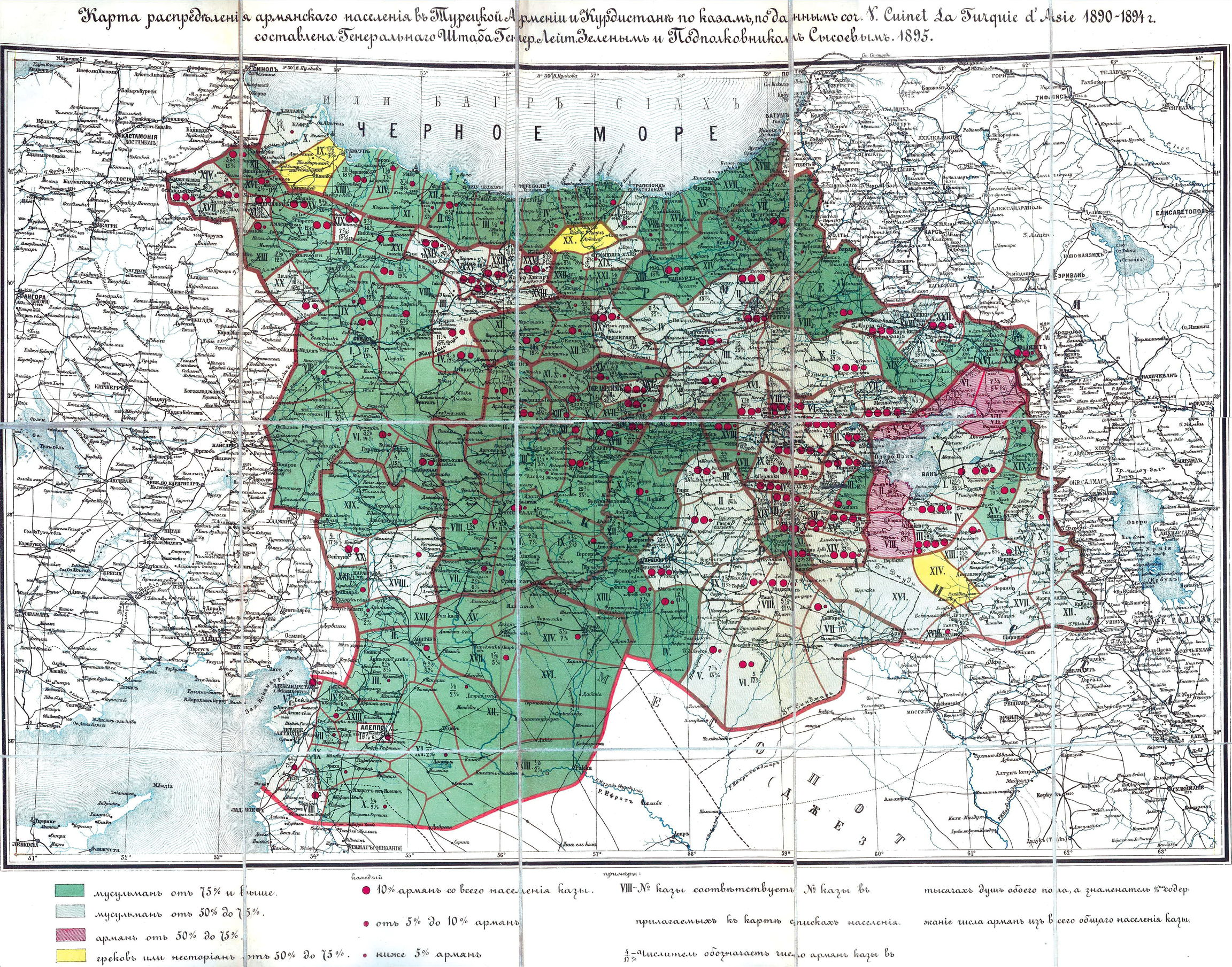

The first notable battle in the Armenian resistance movement took place in Sasun, where nationalist ideals were proliferated by activists of the Social Democrat Hunchakian Party, or Hunchak, activists, such as Damadian and Boyajian. The Armenian Revolutionary Federation, or the Dashnak Party also played a significant role in arming the people of the region. The Armenians of Sasun confronted the Ottoman army and Kurdish irregulars, succumbing to superior numbers. This was followed by the Zeitun Rebellion, in which Hunchak activists toured various regions of Cilicia and Zeitun to encourage resistance, and established new branches of the Hunchak Party.

The 1896 Ottoman Bank takeover was perpetrated by Dashnaks armed with pistols, grenades, dynamite and hand-held bombs against the Ottoman Bank in Constantinople. The seizure of the bank lasted 14 hours, resulting in the deaths of 10 of the Armenian men and Ottoman soldiers. The Porte's reaction to the takeover saw further massacres and pogroms of the several thousand Armenians living in Constantinople and Sultan Abdul Hamid II threatening to level the entire building itself. However, intervention on part of the European diplomats in the city managed to persuade the government to give safe passage to the survivors to France. Despite the level of violence the incident had wrought, the takeover was reported positively in the European press, praising the men for their courage and the objectives they attempted to accomplish. The years between 1894 and 1896 ended, with estimates of the dead ranging from 80,000 to 300,000. The Hamidian massacres are named for Sultan Abdul Hamid II, whose efforts to reinforce the territorial integrity of the Ottoman Empire resulted in the massacres.

=== Sasun Uprising: 1904 ===
Ottoman officials involved in the Sasun uprising, who were previously defeated in the First Zeitoun Rebellion, did not want the formation of another semi-autonomous Armenian region in the Eastern vilayets. In Sasun, Armenian activists were working to arm the folk and to recruit young men by motivating them to the Armenian cause. 50,000 Turkish and Kurdish troops started the offensive in Sasun, where 500 fedayees had to defend 20,000 unarmed people. The Armenians were headed by Andranik Ozanian along with Kevork Chavoush, Sepasdatsi Mourad, Keri, Hrayr Tjokhk, and others.

=== Assassination attempt on Sultan Abdul Hamid II: 1905 ===
The events of the Hamidian massacres and Sultan Abdul Hamid II's continued anti-Armenian policies gave way for the Dashnaks to plan an assassination attempt on the sultan to enact vengeance. Dashnak members, led by ARF founder Christapor Mikaelian, secretly started producing explosives and planning the operation in Sofia, Bulgaria. The assassination attempt was unsuccessful in killing Abdul Hamid II, although it resulted in the death of 26 people and a further 58 wounded.

=== Dissolution: 1908–18 ===
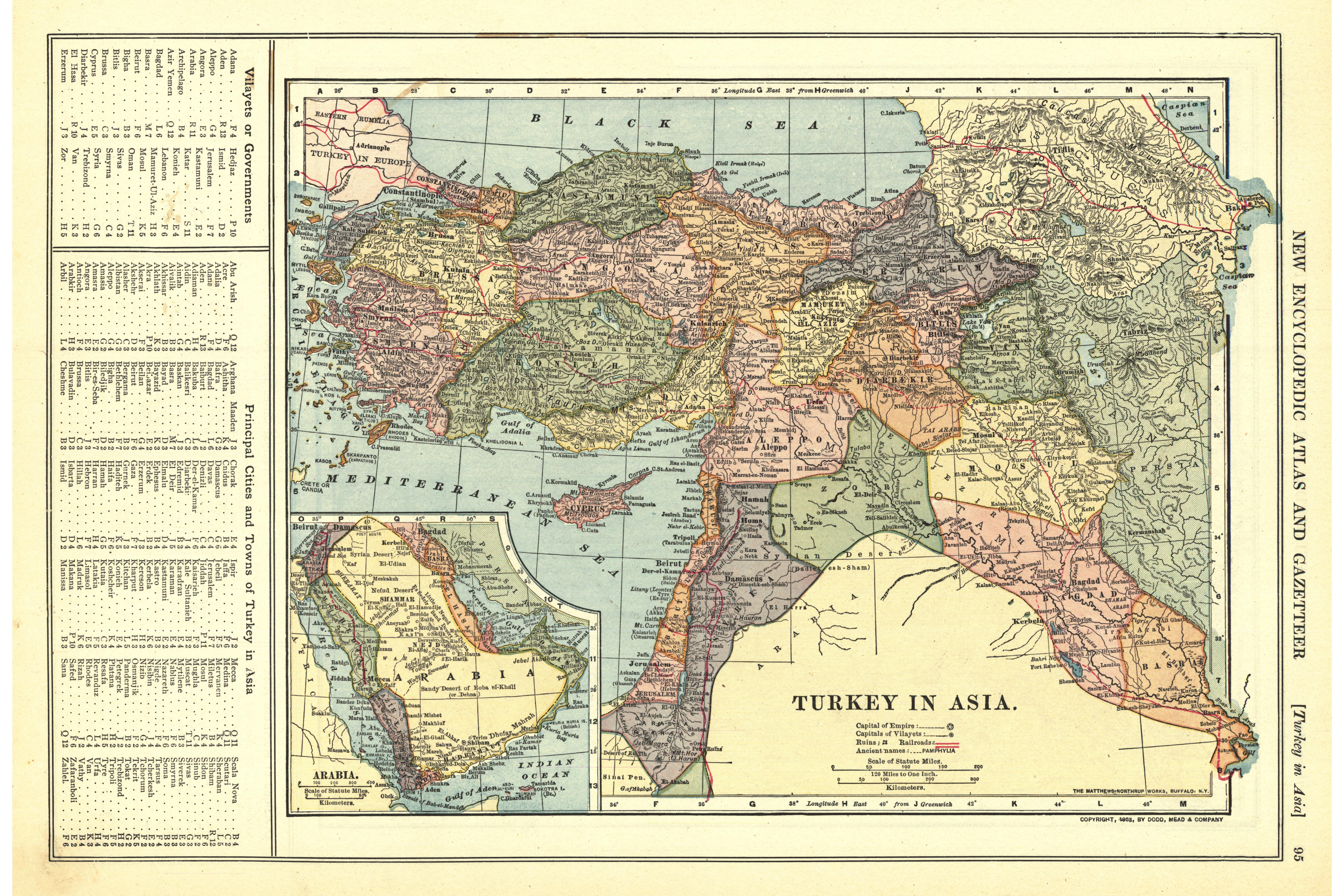
6 Armenian provinces of Western Armenia. Patten, William and J.E. Homas, Turkey in Asia, 1903.

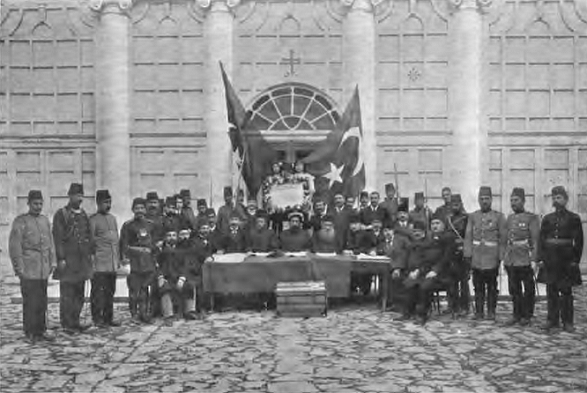
Declaration of the Constitution with leaders of the millets

The Second Constitutional Era of the Empire began shortly after Sultan Abdul Hamid II restored the constitutional monarchy after the 1908 Young Turk Revolution. The period established many political groups. A series of elections during this period resulted in the gradual ascendance of the Committee of Union and Progress's (CUP) domination in politics. This period also marked the dissolution of the Ottoman Empire.

==== Young Turk Revolution: 1908 ====
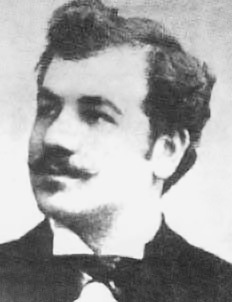
Karekin Pastermadjian member of the Chamber of Deputies representative of the Armenian Revolutionary Federation from Erzurum. He was later elected to be ambassador of Armenia to the United States

On 24 July 1908, Armenians' hopes for equality in the empire brightened when the country returned to constitutional monarchy. Two of the largest revolutionary groups trying to overthrow Sultan Abdul Hamid II had been the Dashnak and the Committee of Union and Progress (CUP) a group part of the Young Turks movement. In a general assembly meeting in 1907, the ARF acknowledged that the Armenian and Turkish revolutionaries had the same goals. Although the Tanzimat reforms had given Armenians more rights, the ARF hoped to gain autonomy to govern Armenian populated areas of the Ottoman Empire as a "state within a state". The "Second Congress of the Ottoman opposition" took place in Paris, France, in 1907. Opposition leaders including Ahmed Riza (CUP), Sabahheddin Bey (Liberal), and Khachatur Maloumian (Dashnak) attended. During the meeting, an alliance between the three parties was officially declared. The Dashnaks decided to cooperate with the CUP, hoping that if the Young Turks came to power, autonomy would be granted to the Armenians.

==== Balkan Wars ====
Andranik Ozanian participated in the Balkan Wars of 1912–1913 alongside general Garegin Nzhdeh as a commander of Armenian auxiliary troops. Andranik met revolutionist Boris Sarafov and the two pledged to work jointly for the oppressed peoples of Armenia and Macedonia. Andranik participated in the First Balkan War alongside Nzhdeh as a Chief Commander of 12th Battalion of Lozengrad Third Brigade of the Macedonian-Adrianopolitan militia under the command of Colonel Aleksandar Protogerov. His detachment consisted of 273 Armenian volunteers. On 5 May 1912, the Dashnak Party officially severed the relations with the Ottoman government; a public declaration of the Western Bureau printed in the official announcement was directed to "Ottoman Citizens". The June issue of Droshak ran an editorial about it. There were overwhelming numbers of Armenians who served the Empire units with distinction during Balkan wars.

==== Armenian reform package: 1914 ====
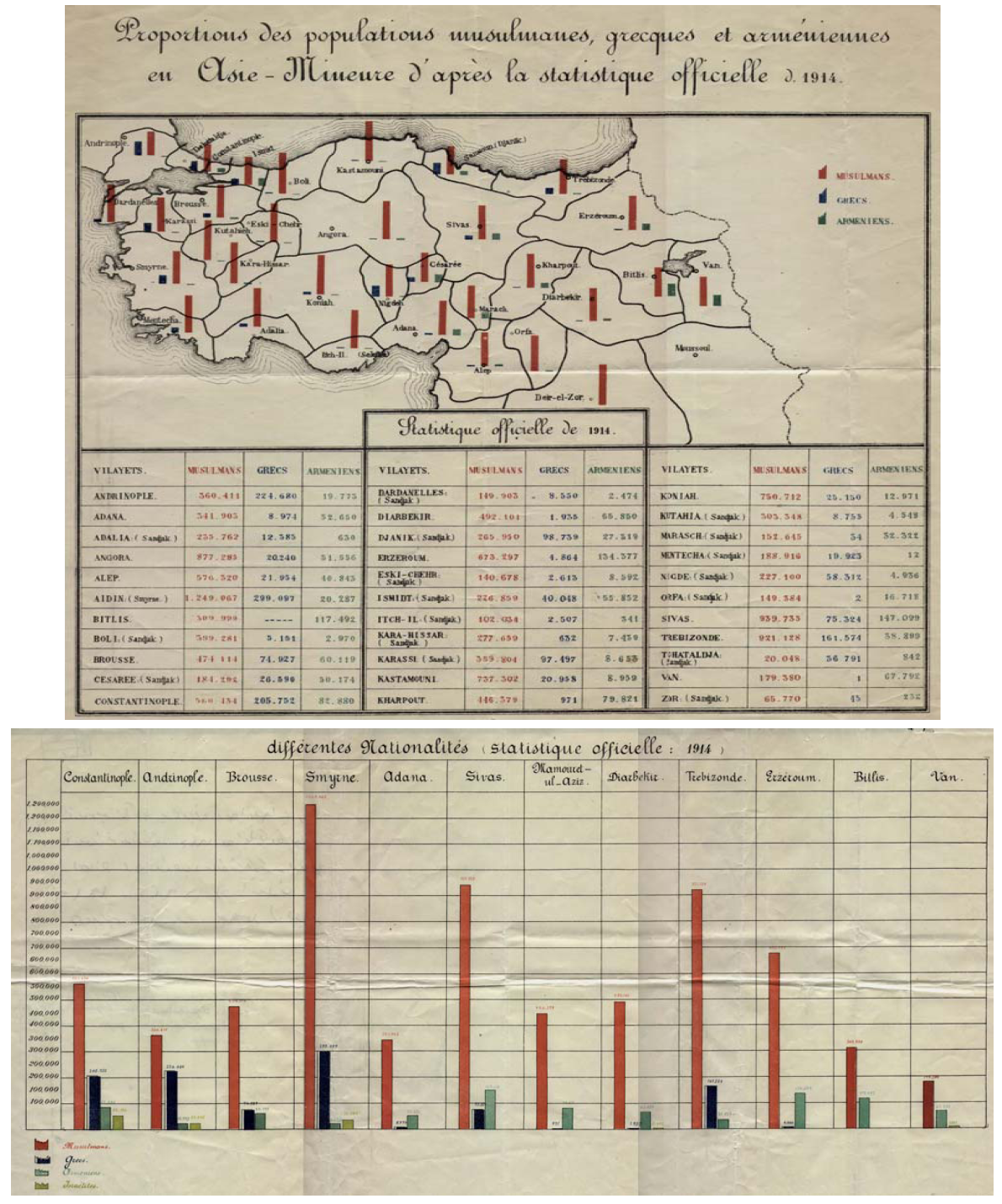
The Armenian reform package declared that the vilayets which Armenians living were to be under an inspectors general, (the map is an archive document of 1914 population statistics).

The Armenian reform package was an arrangement negotiated with Russia, acting on behalf of the Great Powers, and the Ottoman Empire. It aimed to introduce reforms to the Armenian citizens of the empire. This agreement, which was solidified in February 1914 was based on the arrangements nominally made in 1878. According to this arrangement the inspectors general, whose powers and duties constituted the key to the question, were to be named for a period of ten years, and their engagement was not to be revocable during that period.

==== Population ====
Distribution of Ottoman Armenians and locales in 1914 according to Raymond Kévorkian
Vilayet	Localities	Armenians	Churches	Monasteries	Schools	Pupils
Istanbul	49	163,670	53		64	
Thrace	9	30,316	14		15	2,438
Sanjak of Ismet	42	61,675	51		53	7,480
Hüdavendigâr	58	118,992	54		50	6,699
Aidin	16	21,145	26	1	27	2,935
Konya	15	20,738	14	1	26	4,585
Kastamonu	18	13,461	17		18	2,500
Trebizond	118	73,395	106	31	90	9,254
Angora	88	135,869	105	11	126	21,298
Sivas	241	204,472	198	21	204	20,599
Adana	70	119,414	44	5	63	5,834
Aleppo	117	189,565	93	16	113	8,451
Mamuret-ul-Aziz	279	124,289	242	65	204	15,632
Diyarbakir	249	106,867	148	10	122	9,660
Erzurum	425	202,391	406	76	322	21,348
Bitlis	681	218,404	510	161	207	9,309
Van	450	110,897	457	80	192	
TOTAL	2,925	1,914,620	2,538	451	1,996	173,022

==== World War I: 1914–18 ====
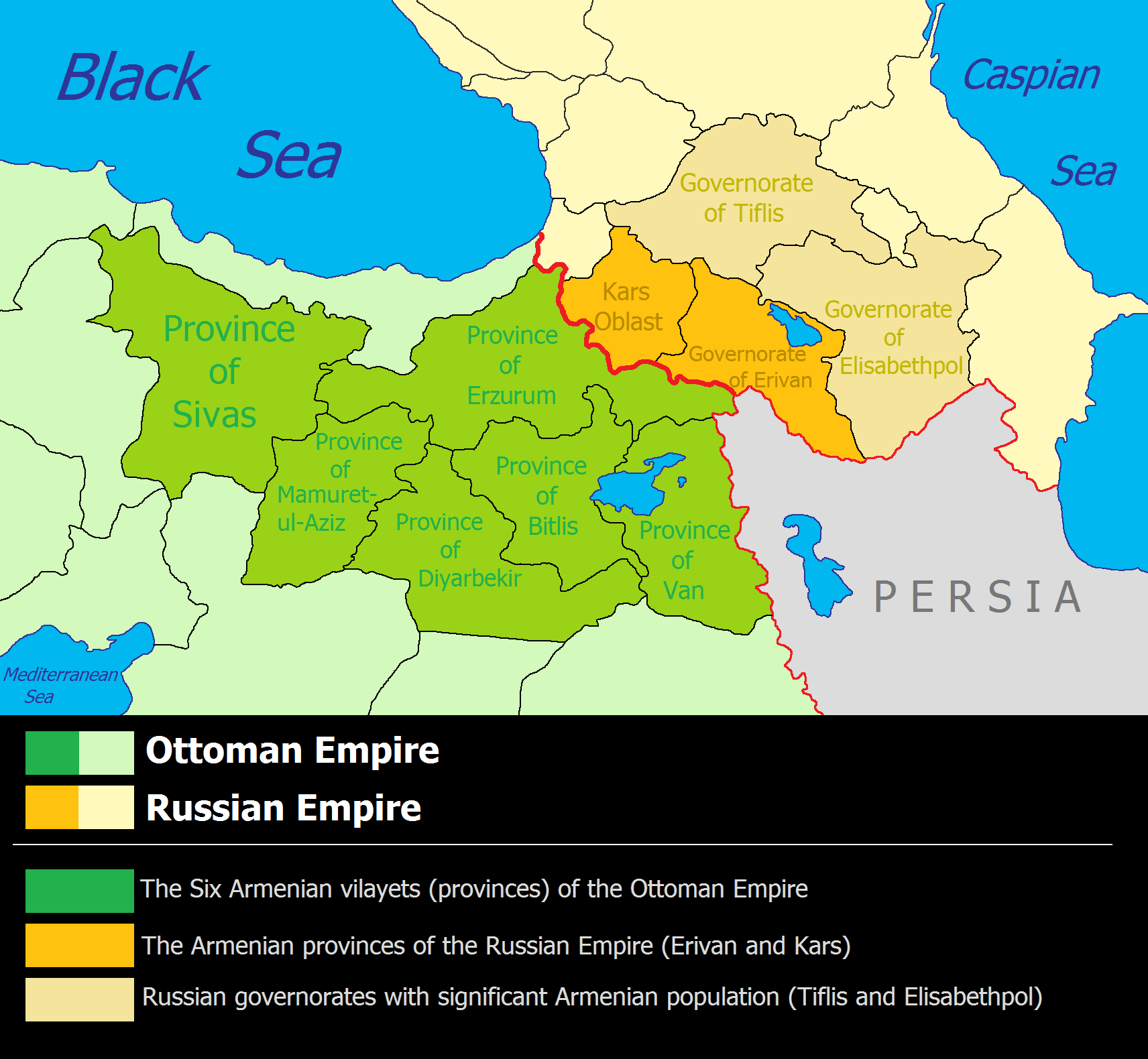
Six Armenian provinces of Western Armenia and boundaries between countries before World War I

During World War I, the Ottoman Empire and Russian Empire fought each other in Caucasus and Persian Campaigns, and the CUP began to consider look on the Armenians with distrust and suspicion. This was due to the fact that the Russian army contained a contingent of Armenian volunteers.

On 24 April 1915, Armenian intellectuals were arrested by Ottoman authorities and, with the Tehcir Law (29 May 1915), the majority of Armenians living in Western Armenia were eventually exterminated or deported in the Armenian genocide. There was local Armenian resistance in the region, developed against the activities of the Ottoman Empire. The events of 1915 to 1917 are widely regarded by historians be a case of state-sponsored genocide.

The Armenian genocide laid the groundwork for a homogeneous Turkish nation state. By the end of World War I, over 90 percent of the Armenians in the Ottoman Empire were gone with most traces of their existence erased. The women and children who survived were frequently forced to convert to Islam and give up their Armenian identities.

== Notable Ottoman Armenians ==
- Amirdovlat of Amasia (1420–8 December 1496), Armenian physician and writer
- Hovakim I of Constantinople (died 1478), Armenian Patriarch of Constantinople
- Mimar Sinan (1488–1588), Chief Ottoman Architect
- Şivekar Sultan (1646–8 August 1648), Haseki Sultan of the Ottoman Empire
- Ermeni Süleyman Pasha (1607–1687), Grand Vizier of Ottoman Empire
- Apkar Tebir, 16th-century Armenian colonist and priest
- Eremia Chelebi (13 May 1637–15 July 1695), Ottoman-Armenian writer
- Mkhitar Sebastatsi (17 February 1676–27 April 1749), Ottoman-Armenian Catholic monk
- Hampartsoum Limondjian (1768–1839), Ottoman-Armenian classical music and Ottoman classical music composer
- Boghos Bey Yusufian (1775–1844), Ottoman Egypt's Minister of Commerce; Minister of Foreign Affairs and Secretary
- Garabet Amira Balyan (1800–1866), Grand Architect of Ottoman Court
- Vartan Pasha (1813–1879), Ottoman-Armenian statesman, author and journalist
- Seferyan Efendi (1820–1899), Ottoman physician, diplomat and translator
- Hagop Kazazian Pasha (1836–1891), Ottoman Minister of Finance
- Artin Dadyan Pasha (1830–1901), Deputy Secretary of State for Foreign Affairs of the Ottoman Empire
- Vichen Abdullahyan (1820–1902), Ottoman-Armenian photographer
- Ohannes Pasha (1852–1933), Ottoman-Armenian official and the last mutasarrif of the Mount Lebanon Mutasarrifate
- Yervant Voskan (1855–1914), Ottoman-Armenian painter, sculptor, instructor and administrator
- Gabriel Noradoungian (1852–1936), Minister of Trade and Minister of Foreign Affairs of the Ottoman Empire
- Abraham Pasha (1833–1918), Ottoman-Armenian civil servant and diplomat
- Krikor Odian (1834–1887), Ottoman-Armenian jurist, politician and writer
- Güllü Agop (1840–1902), Ottoman-Armenian theatre director
- Mikael Portukal Pasha (1841–1897), Ottoman-Armenian economist, educator and politician
- Nubar Pasha (1826–1899) Ottoman Egypt's Armenian politician and the first Prime Minister of Egypt
- Tatyos Efendi (1858–1913), Composer of classical Ottoman-Armenian music
- Calouste Gulbenkian (1869–1955), Engineer, businessman and philanthropist
- Edgar Manas (1875–1964), Composer, conductor and musicologist
- Sarkis Torossian (1891–1954), Decorated Ottoman Armenian captain
- Agop Dilâçar (1895–1979), Turkish-Armenian linguist
- Kigork Berç Keresteci (1871–1949), Ottoman-Armenian bank executive and politician
- Krikor Amirian (1888–1964), Armenian revolutionary
- Karnik Arslanyan (1895–1945), Goalkeeper of Fenerbahçe S.K.
- Shavarsh Krissian (1886–1915), Athlete, writer, publicist, journalist, educator and editor
- Vahram Papazyan (1892–1986), Athlete
- Mıgırdiç Mıgıryan (1882–1915), Athlete
- Toto Karaca, (18 March 1912–22 July 1992), Turkish-Armenian stage actress
- Kenan Pars (10 March 1920–10 March 2008), Turkish-Armenian actor
- Kamer Sadık (1910–September 24, 1986), Turkish-Armenian actor

== Gallery ==
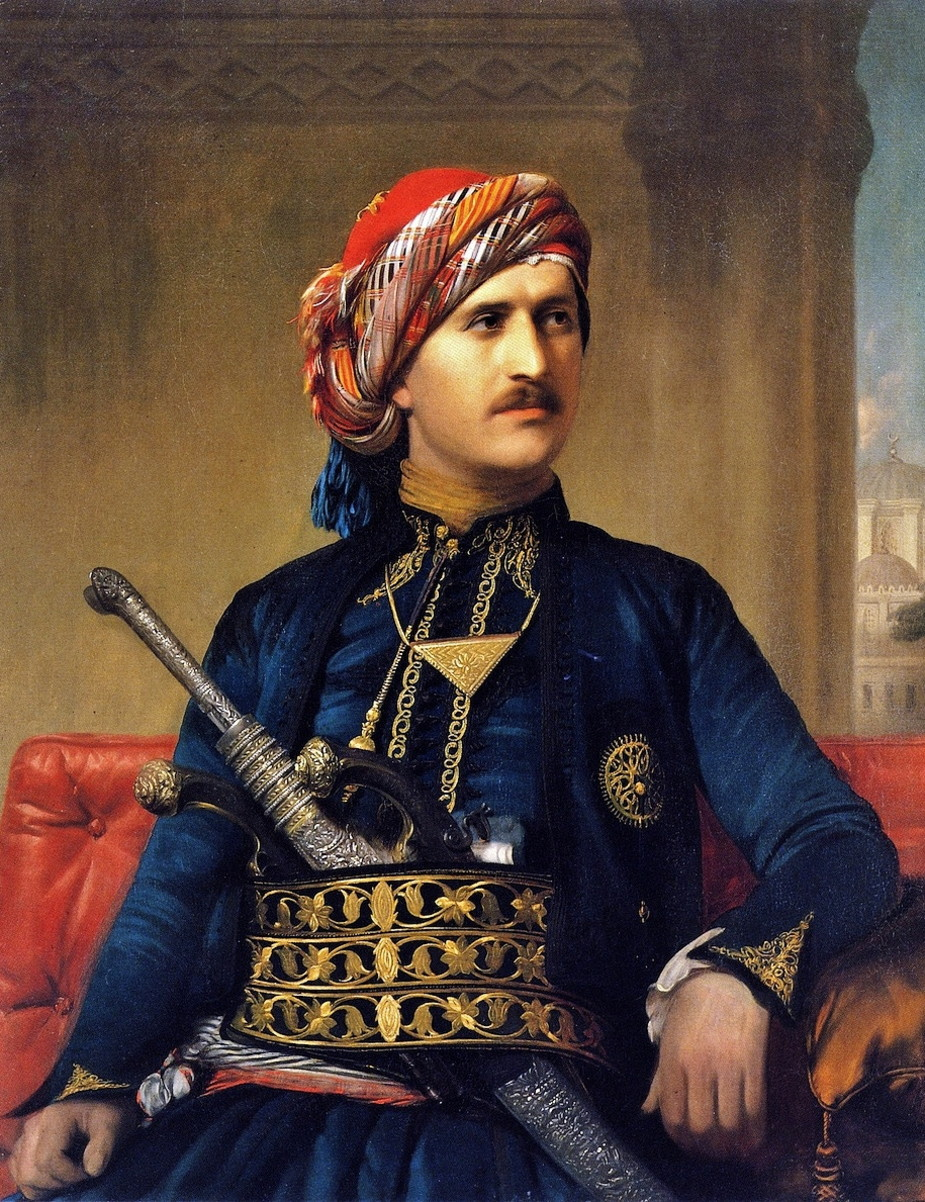
Armenian by Edward Ludlow Mooney, between 1848 and 1849

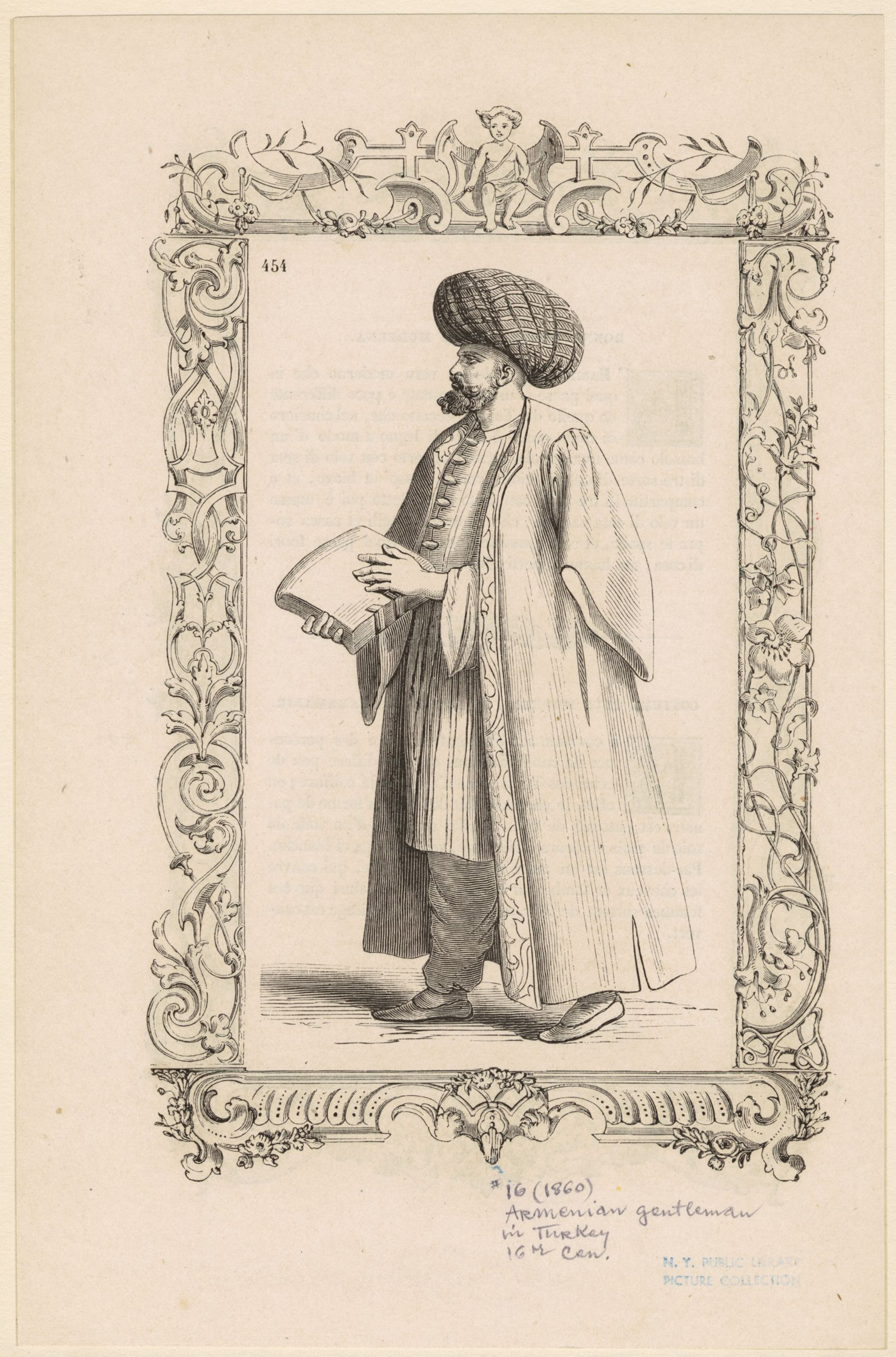
Armenian man from Turkey, 16th century

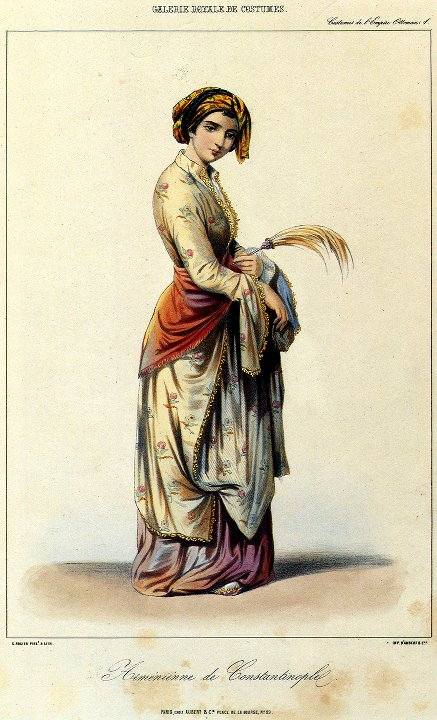
Armenian woman from Constantionpolis, 1844

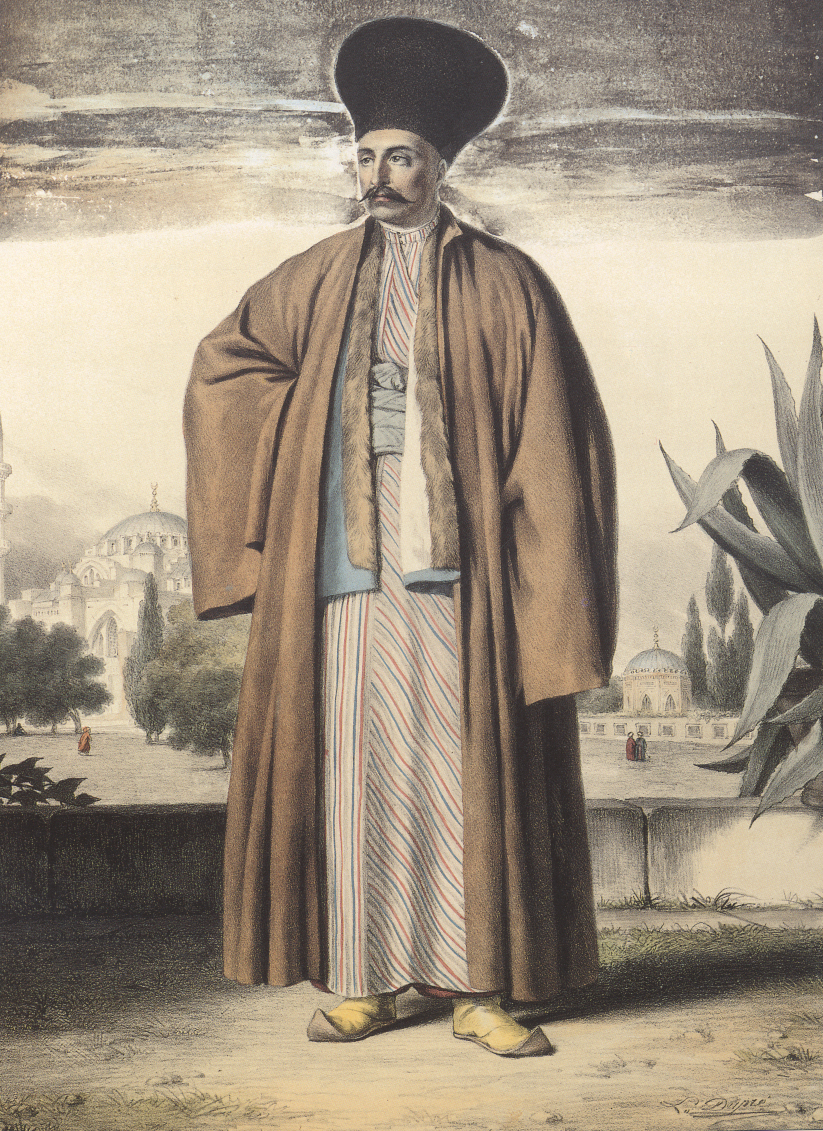
Armenian man by Louis Dupre, 19th century

== See also ==
- Armenia–Turkey relations
- Armenian delegation at the Berlin Congress
- Armenian diaspora
- Armenian question
- Armenian Sport in the Ottoman Empire
- Armenians in Turkey
- Christianity in the Ottoman Empire
- Christianity in Turkey
- Hidden Armenians
- History of Armenia
- Late Ottoman genocides
- Ottoman Armenian population
- Sazonov–Paléologue Agreement
- Six Vilayets
- Timeline of Armenian history
- Western Armenia
- Wilsonian Armenia
- White genocide (Armenians)
