= Ottoman Armenian population =

Overview and statistics of the Armenian population in the Ottoman Empire

The Ottoman Armenian population varied throughout history. The number of Armenians within the empire between 1914 and 1915 is a controversial topic. Most historians estimate the Armenian population in 1914 range from 1.5 to 2 million. According to Britannica prior to 1915 and Samuel Cox, American Embassy in Istanbul from 1880-1886, it was 1.75 million and 2.4 million, respectively.

Establishing the size of this population is very important in determining an accurate estimation of Armenian losses between 1915 and 1923 during the Armenian genocide.

== Classic Period ==
=== Values based on taxation data ===
While the Ottoman Empire had population records prior to the 1830s, it was only in 1831 that the Office of Population Registers fund (Ceride-i Nüfus Nezareti) was founded. To draw more accurate data, the Office decentralized in 1839. Registrars, inspectors, and population officials were appointed to the provinces and smaller administrative districts. They recorded births and deaths periodically and compared lists indicating the population in each district. These records were not a total count of population. Rather, they were based on what is known as “head of household”. Only the ages, occupation, and property of the male family members only were counted.

The official data derived from extending the taxation values to the total population. Because of the use of taxation data to infer population size, detailed data for numerous Ottoman urban centers - towns with more than 5,000 inhabitants - is accurate. This data was collaborated with data on wages and prices. Another source was used for the numbers of landlords of households in the Ottoman Empire – every household was assumed to have 5 residents.

=== Abdolonyme Ubicini (1844) ===
In 1844, the Ottoman government recorded a total of 2.4 million Armenians. Abdolonyme Ubicini, a French historian and journalist, was one of the first to publish the 1844 figure by adding that he considers it an underestimation of the total Ottoman Armenian population. The Armenians inhabiting Ottoman Empire in Europe are scarcely four hundred thousand, of which more than half reside in Constantinople, the others are scattered through Thrace and Bulgaria. On the other hand, Turkey in Asia contains not less than two million Armenians, the majority of whom still inhabit the ancient territory of their forefathers in the neighborhood of Mount Ararat; the three eyalets of Erzeroum, Diarbekir and Kurdistan contain many villages peopled entirely by Armenians, and in these provinces, notwithstanding frequent migrations, the Armenians preserve a numerical superiority over the Turkish and Turkoman races.

Ubicini states:

It is difficult to form an exact estimate of the number of Armenians in the Ottoman Empire. The statement which I have given from official calculation and which raises the number to an average of two million and four hundred thousand, is only an approximate computation, and probably below the truth [...]

A 20th-century Turkish professor, İbrahim Hakkı Akyol, also considers the 1844 as an underestimation of the total Ottoman population because the taxes to be set for each vilayet and kaza would be based on the census result, and the population wanted to avoid them. In 1867, the 2.4 million figure remains unchanged, and was used by Ottoman official Salaheddin Bey in a book published on the occasion of the International Exposition in Paris. On the same occasion, an Ottoman Armenian official named Migirdich Bey Dadian gives a figure of 3.4 million, which the Ottoman government did not contest.

=== Karekin Vartabed Srvantsdiants (1878–79) ===
After the internationalization of the Armenian Question, and the Treaty of Berlin that followed in 1878, the idea of a self-governing Armenian nation became a possibility. Thus, census records of the Armenian population became important. The first record of the General Population Administration under sultan Abdul Hamid was half the figure in 1881–82. The Ottoman Empire lost Batumi, Kars and Ardahan in 1877–78. The Armenian population statistics for those regions would have influenced the losses of Armenian population but can not account for the other million or more Armenians that are missing in the records of 1881–82 under the reign of Hamid.

The Armenian National Constitution of 1863 granted by the Ottoman Sultan to the Ottoman Armenians in 1863 authorized the Armenian Patriarchate of Constantinople to collect population figures of all Armenians in the Empire. A first attempt was delegated to Karekin Vartabed Srvantsdiants in 1878, who made two trips to Armenian vilayets in 1878 and 1879. However, in certain areas, Kurdish tribes that had taken by force the Armenian villages and would not allow him entry. The 1878 attempt was a failure and was not published.

=== Samuel Cox (1880–86) ===
Samuel Cox at the American Embassy in Istanbul from 1880 to 1886, estimated the Armenian population within the empire to be of 2.4 million.

== 1893–96 Ottoman Census statistics ==
Geographic and Demographic maps

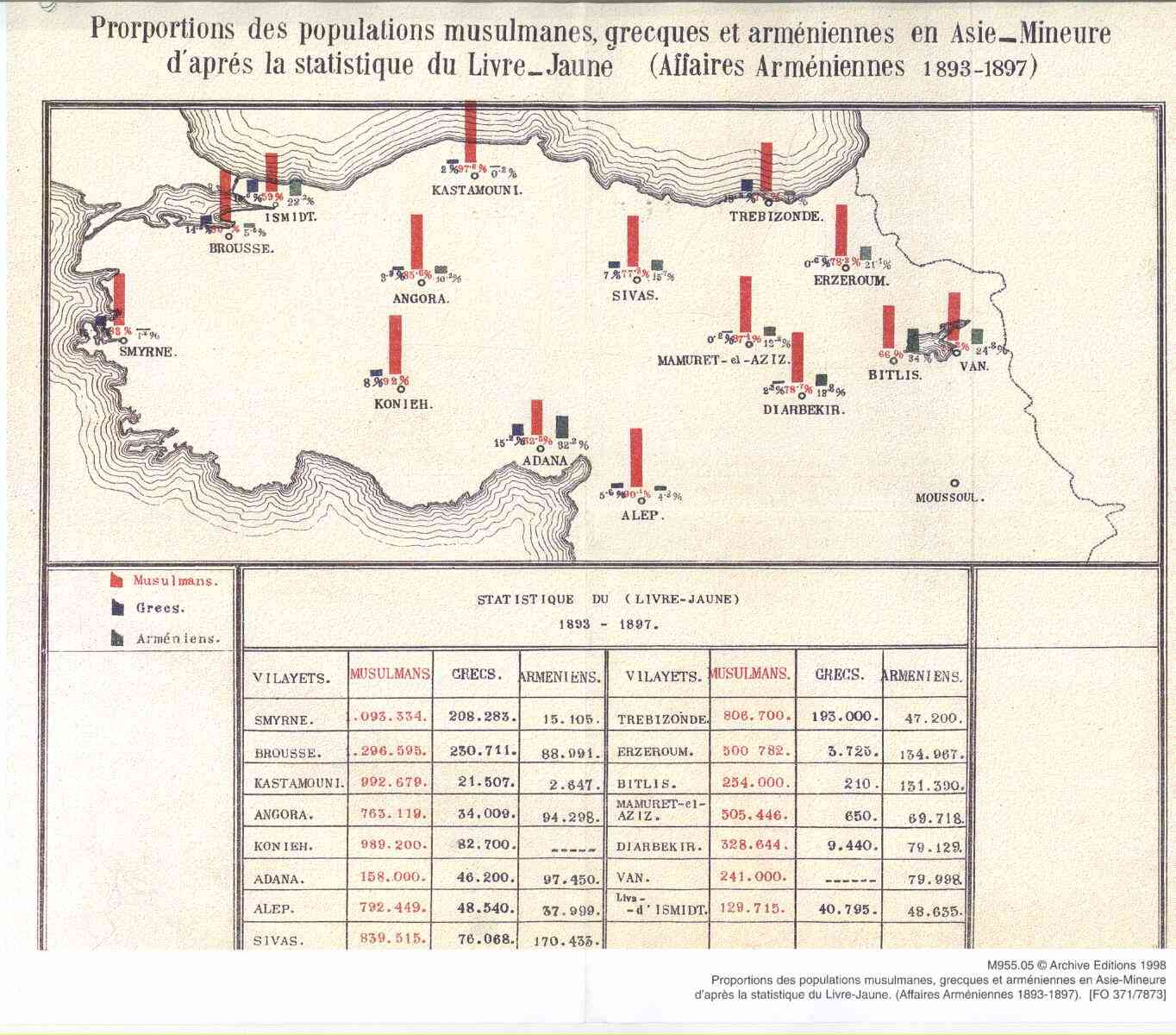
1893-96, Armenian population

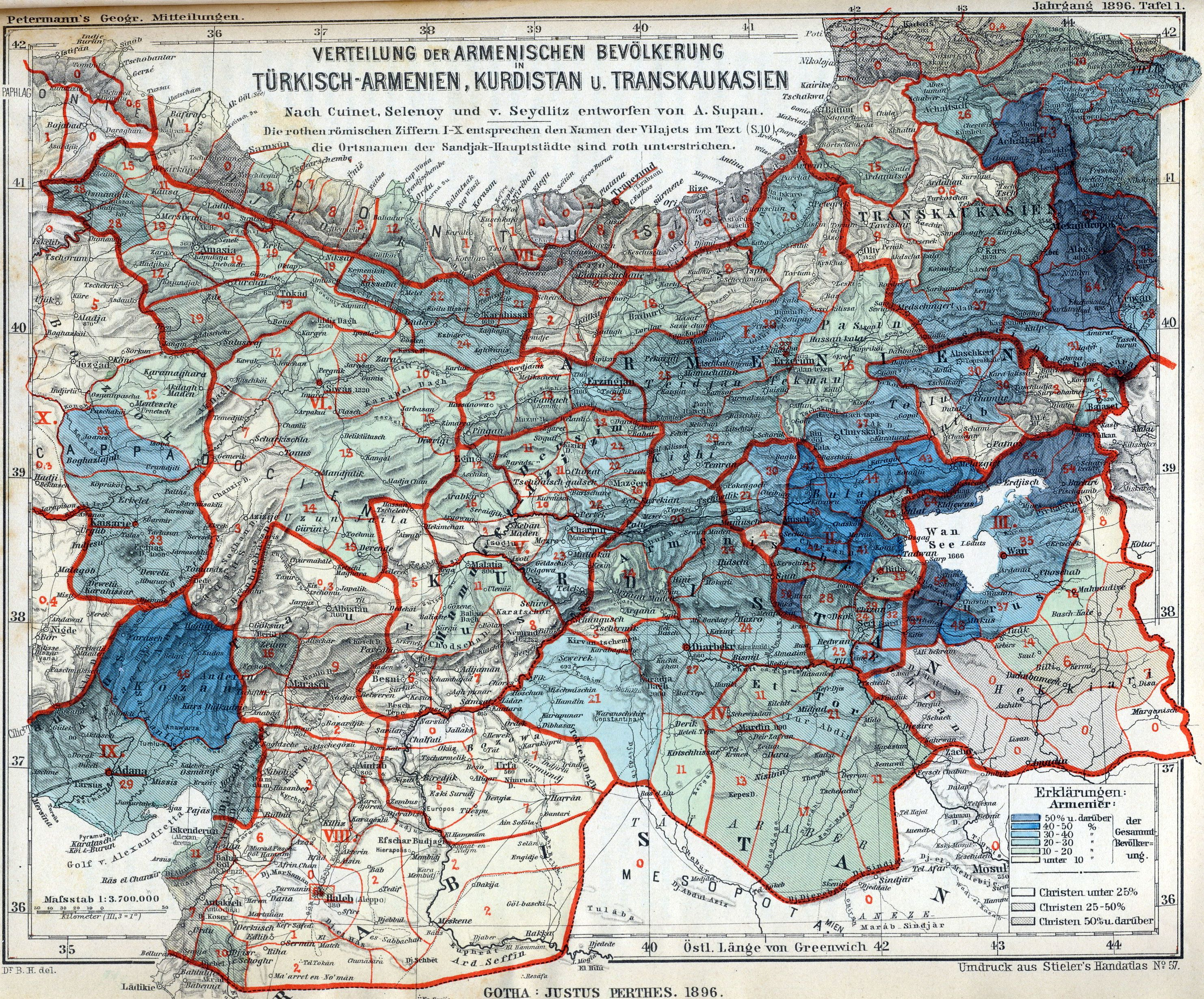
1893-96, Armenian distribution.

The first official census (1881–93) took 10 years to finish. In 1893, the results were compiled and presented. This census is the first modern, general and standardized census accomplished not for taxation nor for military purposes, but to acquire demographic data. The population was divided into ethno-religious and gender characteristics. Numbers of both male and female subjects are given in ethno-religious categories including Muslims, Greeks, Armenians, Bulgarians, Catholics, Jews, Protestants, Latins, Syriacs and Gypsies.

In 1867, the Council of States took charge of drawing population tables, increasing the precision of population records. They introduced new measures of recording population counts in 1874. This led to the establishment of a General Population Administration, attached to the Ministry of Interior in 1881-1882. Somehow, these changes politicized the population counts.

=== Official Values (published 1897) ===
Ottoman Census Values
Administrative Unit	Total Pop	Armenian Pop	% to Total
Van	132,007	55,051	41.70%
Bitlis	338,642	108,050	31.91%
Izmit	228,443	44,953	19.68%
Erzurum	637,015	120,147	18.86%
Dersaadet	903,482	166,185	18.39%
Mamüratülaziz	466,579	83,394	17.87%
Diyarbakir	414,657	60,175	14.51%
Sivas	980,876	129,085	13.16%
Adana	398,764	36,695	9.20%
Halep	819,238	70,663	8.63%
Ankara	1,018,744	81,437	7.99%
Hüdavendigar	1,454,294	70,262	4.83%
Trabzon	1,164,595	49,782	4.27%
Sehremanati Mülhakati	88,306	3,074	3.48%
Edirne	985,962	18,458	1.87%
Çatalca	61,001	979	1.60%
Biga	143,904	1,842	1.28%
Konya	1,022,834	10,972	1.07%
Aydin	1,478,424	15,229	1.03%
Zor	51,270	474	0.92%
Kastamonu	968,884	6,652	0.69%
Kudüs	258,860	1,610	0.62%
Beyrut	620,763	2,921	0.47%
Suriye	551,135	1,478	0.27%
Selanik	1,038,953	51	0.00%
Cezayir-i Bahri Sefid	286,736	10	0.00%
Manastir	711,466	22	0.00%
		1,139,651	

=== Vital Cuinet (1896) ===
Vital Cuinet was a French geographer who was charged to survey areas and count their population. His figures were also used to establish the ability of the Ottoman Empire to pay its debts, Cuinet eager to get precise numbers was finally forced to conclude that it was not possible to get them, he gives two main reasons for this.

1. The limitations imposed by the Turkish authorities made his researches inconclusive.
2. Because of the lack of control of the Turkish authorities for farther provinces, it was impossible for him to complete his work.

An example often referred by the critics, was Cuinet's statistics drawn from Ottoman authority numbers and information that they provided him regarding the Vilayet of Aleppo (classified in those works as the sandjak of Marash). The number is an impossible 4,300. While only in the city of Marash, the Catholic and Protestant Armenians were numbering 6,008, and this without including the Gregorians. Cuinet at the beginning of his work, cautioned the reader by declaring: "The science of statistics so worthy and interesting, not only still is not used in this country but even the authorities refuses, with a party line, to accept any investigation."

Regardless of what could have been considered as an indirect admission of under counting. Cuinet presented 840,000 for 1891–92, of what was called “Armenian Villayet” a figure higher than the one presented from Ottoman statistics.

La Turquie d'Asie: géographie administrative, statistique, Volume 4
Admin-units	Sub-units as listed by Cuinet	Population
Adana Vilayet	sanjaks of Icel (Mersin) Adana Kozan Osmaniye	97,450
Aleppo Vilayet	Haleb	37,999
Ankara Vilayet	sanjaks of Ankara Kırşehir Yozgat Kayseri	94,298
Bitlis Vilayet	sanjaks of Muş Genç Siirt	131,300
Bursa Vilayet	sanjaks of Balıkesir Bursa Erdogrul Kütahya Afyon	88,991
Diyâr-ı Bekr Vilayet	sanjak of Diyarbakır and the mutasarrifate of Zor	67,718
Erzurum Vilayet		134,967
İzmir Vilayet	sanjaks of Manisa İzmir Aydın Denizli Mentese	15,105
İzmit		48,655
Kastamonu Vilayet	sanjaks of Bolu Çankırı Kastamonu Sinop	2,647
Konya Vilayet	sanjaks of Burdur Hamid abad Atalya Konya Nigde	0
Mamure-ul-Azil Vilayet		79,128
Sivas Vilayet	sanjaks of Sivas Tokat Amasya Şebinkarahisar	170,433
Trebizond Vilayet	sanjaks of Samsun Trabzon Gümüşhane Lazistan	47,20
Van Vilayet	sanjaks of Van Hakkari	79,998
		1,095,889

=== Henry Finnis Bloss Lynch (1901) ===
Lynch indicated, like Cuinet, that there was a seemly deliberate Ottoman policy of under counting. Nonetheless, Lynch figures were well circulated, but he cautioned the reader regarding the misleading character of the term “Muslim” since many Armenians converted and were counted as Muslim, while they were still practicing Armenian Christians.

The British official figures at the embassy relied upon careful investigations like those of Lynch. When comparing those figures with Ottoman figures, Zamir concludes: "the provinces of Van, Bitlis, Mamuretal-Aziz (Harput), Diyarbekir, Erzerum, and the independent district of Maras, where British figures are 62 percent higher (847,000) compared with 523,065.” For those reasons he was forced to conclude: “The understatement of the non-Moslem figures appears to be intentional."

Britannica itself takes the figure of 1,750,000 as "a reasonable representation of the Armenian population in Anatolia prior to 1915."

== 1905–06 Ottoman Census statistics ==
Geographic map

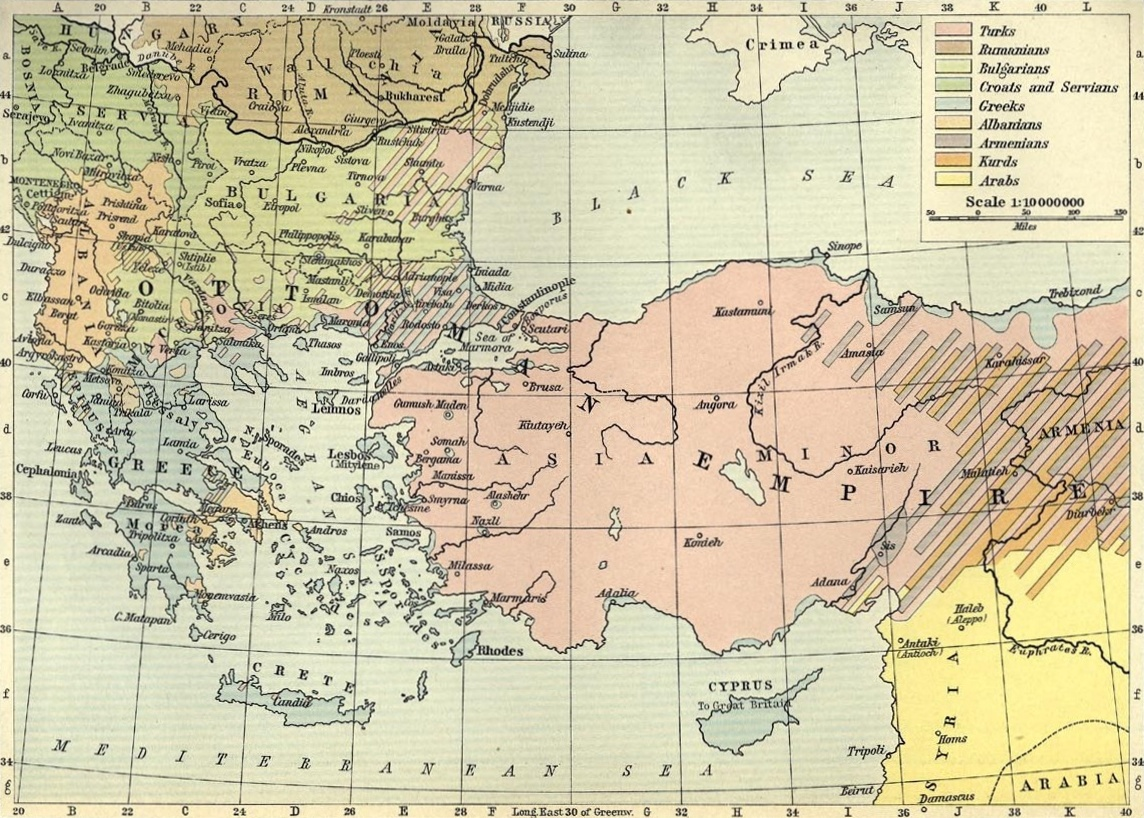
It covers 1905–06 but was printed in 1911. Note the boundaries before the Balkan Wars, which included the Armenian population in the Rumelia Eyalet that did not reside in the empire.

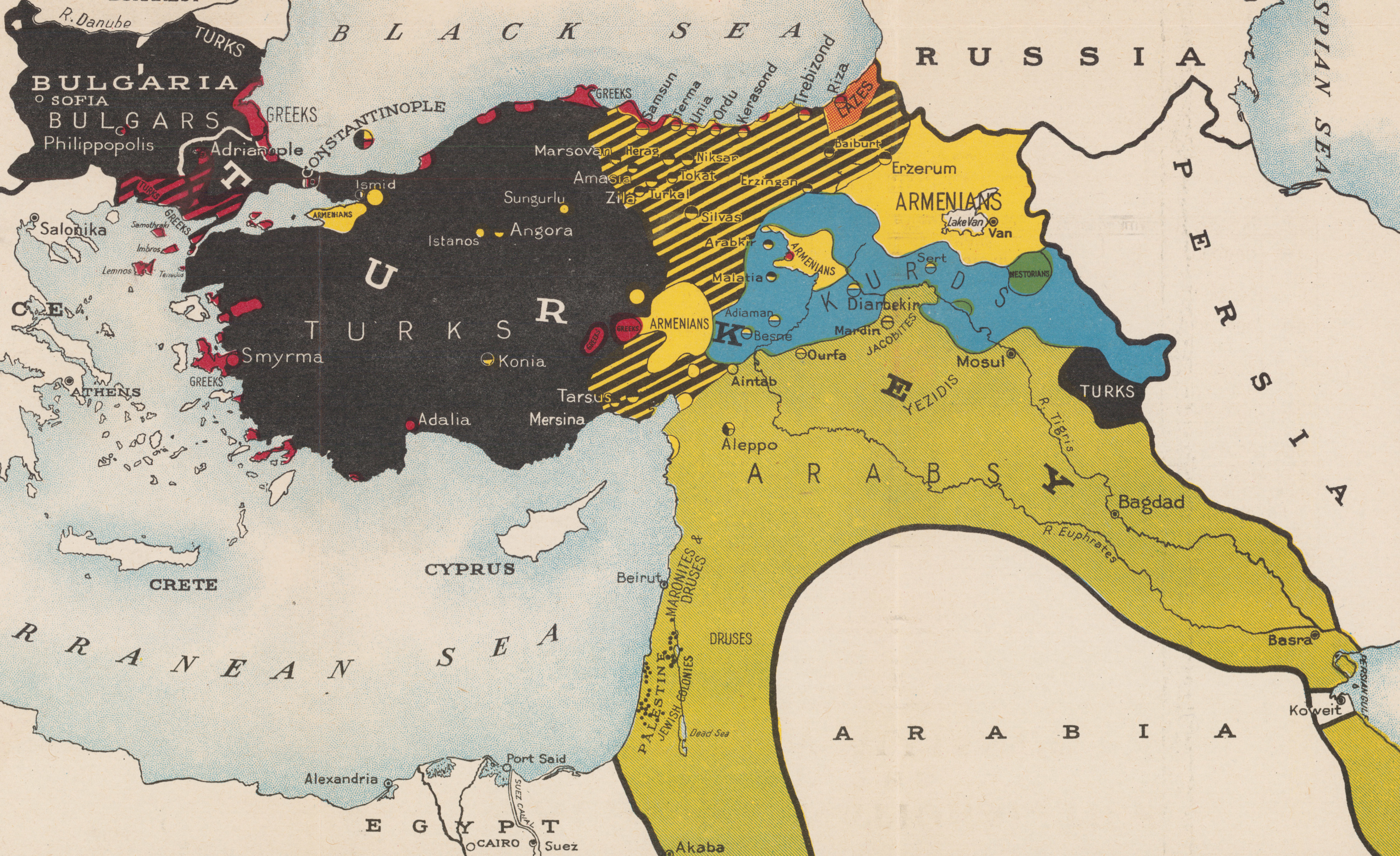
Ethnic map of Asia Minor in 1917. Black = Bulgars and Turks. Red = Greeks. Light yellow = Armenians. Blue = Kurds. Orange = Lazes. Dark Yellow = Arabs. Green = Nestorians.

Istatistik-i Umumi Idaresi conducted a new census survey for which field work lasted two years (1905–06). This survey's complete documentation was not published. Results of regional studies on this data were published later, which were sorted by their publication date. Included in the publication and subsequent ones was the Ottoman Empire's population as of 1911, 1912 and 1914. The substantial archival documentation on the census has been used in many modern studies and international publications. After 1906 the Ottoman Empire began to disband and a chain of violent wars such as the Italo-Turkish War, Balkan Wars and World War I drastically changed the region, its borders, and its demographics.

=== Official Population Statistics (published 1914) ===
Demographic map

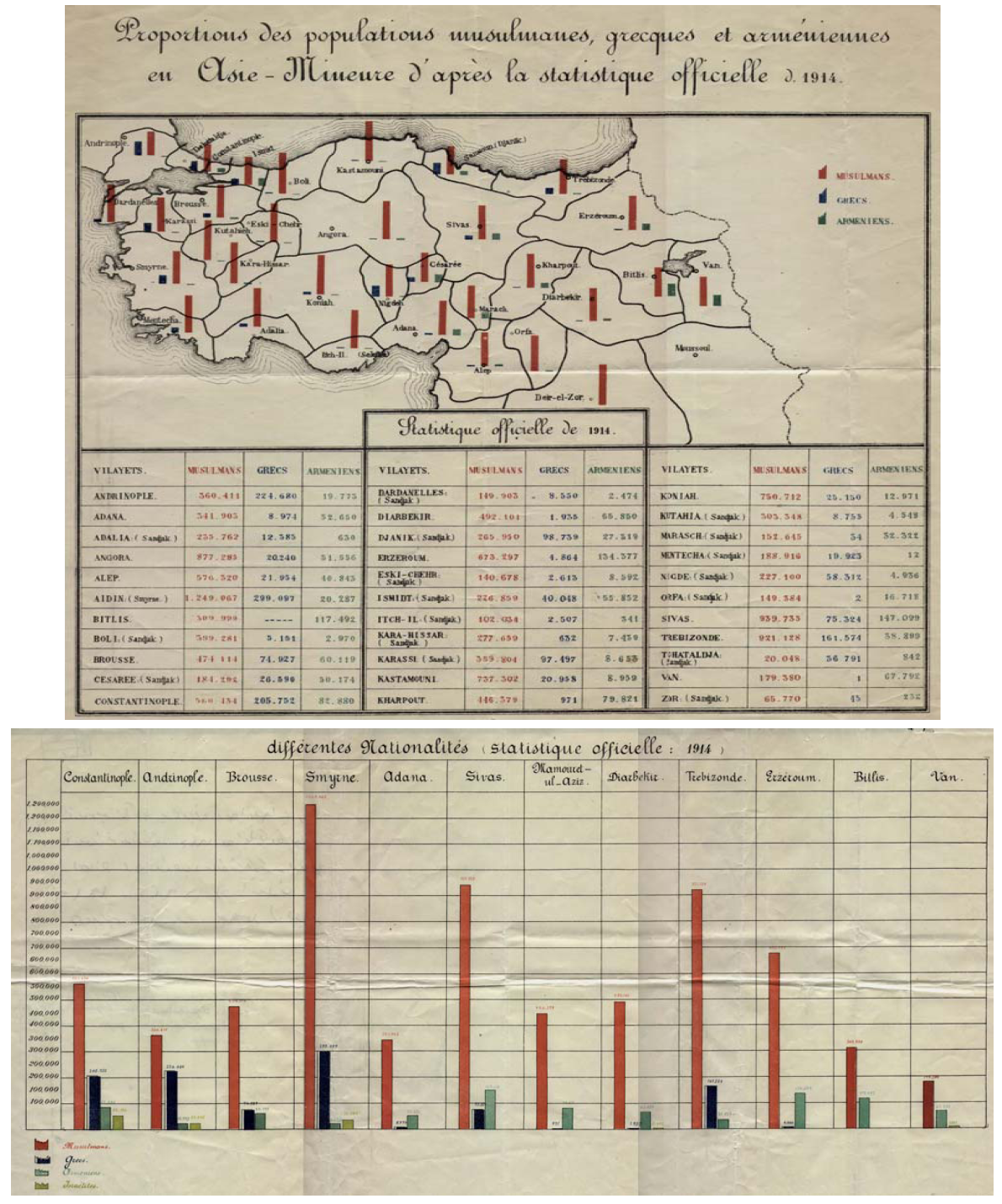
Armenian population in 1914.

There was no official census in 1914, contrary to some sources, but a mere approximation of figures taken from the 1905-06 Ottoman census based on official yearly birth and date figures (leaving villages unreported) along with a religious grouping as opposed to an ethnic one, equating all Muslims in one single column and undercounting native Christian population growth rates, because of the Ottoman Court's deliberate omission of the Ecclesiastical statistics, which included actual denominational baptism and death rates. The 1905-06 Ottoman census was the last actual Ottoman census.

=== 1914 Armenian settlements ===
Armenian settlements, churches and schools in 1914 and 1922:

Vilayets/regions	Settlements	Churches	Schools
Erzurum Vilayet	425	482	322
Van Vilayet	450	537	192
Diyâr-ı Bekr Vilayet	249	158	122
Mamuretülaziz Vilayet	279	307	204
Bitlis Vilayet	681	671	207
Sivas Vilayet	241	219	204
Trebizond Vilayet	118	109	190
Western Anatolia	237	281	300
Cilicia and Northern Syria	187	537	176
East Thrace / European Turkey	58	67	79
Mutasarrifate of Jerusalem	1	10	1
Ottoman Empire	2,925	3,368	1,996

== Armenian Patriarchate records ==
Armenian Patriarchate figures records were based on records of baptisms and deaths kept by Armenian bishops across the Ottoman Empire. Those figures excluded the regions where Armenian population was not considerable, as well as excluded the areas outside of the Six vilayets.

Just for comparison, the Patriarchate Statistics of Armenians residing in the six vilayets (known as Ottoman Armenia) reported 1,018,000 Armenians against 784,914 for the Ottoman figures.

=== 1913 ===
This set of Armenian Patriarchate figures were published in 1913. The Armenian Patriarch ordered Armenian bishops to take Ottoman statistics and local information from Armenian parishes, correcting them for perceived undercounts.

In 1992, Raymond H. Kevorkian and Paul B. Paboudjian published a book containing figures drawn from the Armenian Archives and based on the archives of the Armenian Patriarchate of Constantinople, ranging from February 1913 to August 1914, that contains the figures for each Ottoman province in detail. The figures included here come from their book. For the figure of the entire Ottoman Armenian population, those records indicate 1,914,620.

These figures closely match with the Ottoman statistics for the Western part of the Empire, but diverge in the Eastern zone, where the Ottoman statistics are suspected to have considerably undercounted the Armenian population. In some regions, the actual Ottoman counts were higher.

Figures by the Armenian Patriarch of Constantinople from February 1913 to August 1914:

Raymond H. Kevorkian and Paul B. Paboudjian
Vilayet	Armenian population
Bitlis Vilayet	218,404
Sivas Vilayet	204,472
Erzurum Vilayet	202,391
Aleppo Vilayet	189,565
Istanbul	163,670
Ankara Vilayet	135,869
Mamuretülaziz Vilayet	124,289
Adana Vilayet	119,414
Bursa Vilayet	118,992
Van Vilayet	110,897
Diyâr-ı Bekr Vilayet	106,867
Trebizond Vilayet	73,395
İzmit Vilayet	61,675
Edirne Vilayet	30,316
Aidin Vilayet	21,145
Konya Vilayet	20,738
Kastamonu Vilayet	13,461
TOTAL	1,914,620

=== Arnold J. Toynbee (1916) ===
Geographic and Demographic maps

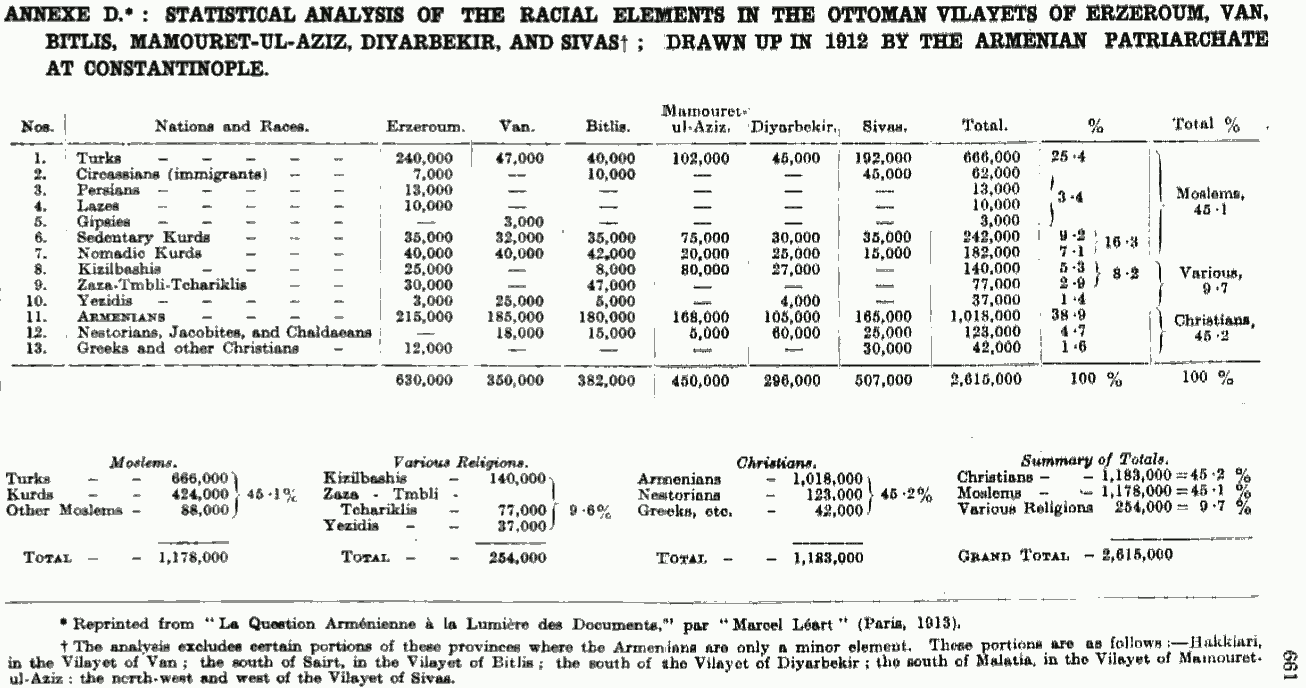

In 1912, the Armenian population in the six vilayets of the Ottoman Empire according to Armenian Patriarchate of Constantinople was 1,018,000. Toynbee settle on between 1.6 and 2.0 million and states that the real number is probably closer to 2 million for Anatolia, pushing the median slightly on the right.

== Arguments of Armenian population controversy ==
There have been various Western records representing the Armenian population, but demographic figures representing the total Armenian population within the Ottoman Empire were few. The problem with such figures is that they do not cover the same regions. For instance, many times "Anatolia" is equalled with the Ottoman Empire. Other times there are partial statistics representing one region, like Turkish Armenia, Ottoman Armenia, Asiatic Turkey, Anatolia, Ottoman Empire, 6 Armenian Villeyets, 9 Armenian Villeyets etc.

Another problem with the figures is that those numbers were drawn from a period of about 20 to 30 years, mostly from 1890 to 1915. German official figures representing the Armenian population within the Empire were about 1.9 million to 2 million. side of 1.8 million. Ludovic de Contenson, present the figure of 1,150,000 for Asiatic Turkey, and call them "statistics" without any sources. His numbers suggest that they might actually be the Ottoman census statistics, without correction. Another problem arises, and it is the fact that the Ottoman census statistics have maintained constant increase for the Armenian population from the period where between 1894–1897, an estimated 100,000 to 300,000 Armenians lost their lives during the Hamidian massacres. While the minimum in the range represent the Armenian increases of population over years, the 1905 census hasn't shown any anomaly of Armenian increases, which suggest that there might have been a fixed quota of Armenian population, and that regardless of the census, there were much more Armenians within the Empire. Another element that add, is that many Armenians, like many Jews and Christians, were considered as foreigners, because they had foreign nationalities or enjoyed the protection of foreign consulates and those for were not counted in those census statistics.

The result of all those factors, is that the Armenian population censuses, according to the specialists that criticize them, is an important under counting of the Armenian population, that could have gone as far as misrepresenting it by half. Lynch critic itself regarding the inclusion of all the Muslims together, when there were probably Armenians in the count, is supported by the Ottoman census, that contain an anomaly that in some region like Van, the Muslim population from one census to another jumped to about 50%, suggesting that numbers for the Ottoman government could have been used as political tool, and went as far as transferring Armenians in the table as Muslim. In fact Ottoman census didn't define any ethnic groups, only religious ones. In this context Armenian meant an adherent of Armenian Apostolic Church not an ethnic Armenian. Ethnic Armenians who claimed to be Muslims were counted as Muslims, Armenian Protestants were counted as others. So Ottoman records aren't reliable sources- the problem is that they don't give the ethnic breakup of the population, only the religious one. The fact that the 1912 records are based on a census that was conducted under the Hamidian regime, according to the critics, makes it dubious. Turkish records as also suggest that sultan Hamid might have intentionally under-counted the Armenian population. The Turkish author Kâzım Kadri writes, "During the reign of Abdul Hamid we lowered the population figures of the Armenians..." He adds, "By the order of Abdul Hamid the number of the Armenians deliberately had been put in low figures."

Other evidence suggests such under-counts cut in half the actual Armenian population. In the district of Mus (compromising Mus plain, Sassoun, and the counties of Mus) for example, the Armenian official in charge of the census, Garabed Potigian, presented the official figures as 225,000 Armenians and 55,000 Turks. Upon the insistence of his Turkish superiors he was forced to reduce the Armenian population to 105,000 and increase the Turkish population to 95,000. Lynch himself report similar incidents: "Pursuing our way, we meet an Armenian priest—a young, broad-shouldered, open-faced man. He seems inclined to speak, so we ask him how many churches there may be in Mush (Mus). He answers, seven; but the commissary had said four. A soldier addresses him in Kurdish; the poor fellow turns pale, and remarks that he was mistaken in saying seven; there cannot be more than four ...Such are a few of our experiences during our short sojourn at Mush."

Sultan Hamid apparently considered the under evaluation presented to him of 900,000 as exaggeration. The German chief of staff of the Ottoman Third Army, Colonel Felix Guse, complained that "The Turks knew only poorly their country, on top of that the possibility of getting reliable statistical figures was out of the question. Fa'iz El-Ghusein, the Kaimakam of Kharpout, wrote in his book, that according to the Ottoman official statistics there were about 1.9 million Armenian's in the Ottoman Empire. Another indication that other statistics might have existed is that Polybius in his book published in 1919, refer to a said "Ottoman Official Census of 1910." The Turkish historian Dr. Secil Akgun, claimed: "The Ottomans do not have a definite number. That is, we have in our hands contradictory numbers regarding the Armenian population within the borders of the Ottoman Empire. I would think that Basmacıyan gives the most accurate number. This is to be between two and three million."

== See also ==
- Ottoman Armenian casualties
- Armenians in Turkey
