= Abraham Pasha =

Ottoman diplomat (1833–1918)

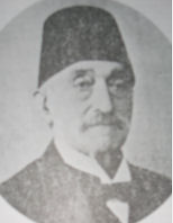
Abraham Paşa

Abraham Pasha, originally Abraham Eramyan, (Istanbul, 1833 - Istanbul, 1918) was an Ottoman civil servant and diplomat of Armenian origin.

The son of an Armenian banker family, he was a close friend of Sultan Abdülaziz. He spoke fluently Turkish, Arabic and French, and was a prominent figure of Pera high society in Istanbul.

== Financial decline ==
1883 marked the beginning of Pasha's financial decline, he was financially ruined and unable to repay his debts. Abraham Pasha was forced to surrender his investments on the Bourse and all his properties to the Ottoman Bank in 1898. His personal properties were sold by the bank in 1919 to a stockbroker named Manouk Manoukian.
