= Hovakim I of Constantinople =

Armenian Patriarch of Constantinople from 1461 to 1478

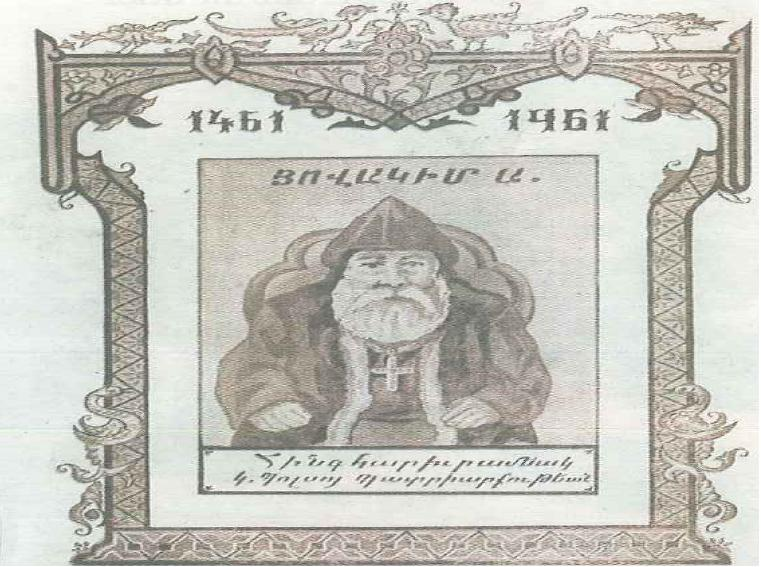
Hovakim I of Constantinople

Hovakim I, also known as Hovakim of Bursa, was the first Armenian Patriarch of Constantinople under the authority of the Catholicos of Armenia and of all Armenians. He and his community were invited by the Ottoman Sultan Mehmed II to the city from Bursa in 1461, eight years after the Fall of Constantinople (1453). Hovakim I was recognized as the religious and secular leader of all Armenians in the Ottoman Empire, and carried the title of milletbaşı or ethnarch as well as patriarch. He was Armenian Patriarch from 1461 to 1478.
