= Marmnamarz =

Armenian language sports magazine in the Ottoman Empire (1911–1914)

- Editor: Shavarsh Krissian
- Categories: Sports magazine
- Frequency: Monthly
- Founder: Shavarsh Krissian
- Founded: 1911
- First issue: February 1911
- Final issue: 1914
- Country: Ottoman Empire
- Based in: Constantinople
- Language: Western Armenian

Marmnamarz (Armenian: Մարմնամարզ), published between 1911 and 1914, was one of the first sport magazines in the Ottoman Empire. The magazine was established and edited by Shavarsh Krissian. The first issue appeared in February 1911. Published monthly in Armenian (with "Marmnamarz" meaning sport in Armenian) the magazine offered an additional incentive for extending the interest towards the sport among the Ottoman Armenians.

Marmnamarz, the "body of national physical training", became the major instrument for the development of sport and athletic life among the Armenian population. This magazine published information about various sport games and their results, as well as published photos of Armenian and foreign athletes and Armenian football teams.

Marmnamarz ceased publication in 1914.

== See also ==
- Armenian Sport in the Ottoman Empire
