= Shavarsh Krissian =

Armenian writer (1886–1915)

- Շաւարշ Քրիսեան
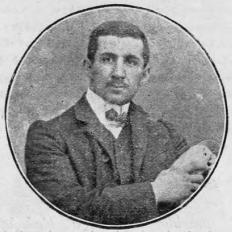
- Born: 22 July 1886; Constantinople, Ottoman Empire
- Died: 15 August 1915 (aged 29); Ayaş, Ankara, Ottoman Empire
- Cause of death: Armenian genocide
- Education: Robert College
- Known for: athlete, writer, publicist, journalist, educator, editor of Marmnamarz, and founding member of Homenetmen
- Political party: Armenian Revolutionary Federation

Shavarsh Krissian (22 July 1886 – 15 August 1915) was an athlete, writer, publicist, journalist, educator, and editor of Marmnamarz, the first sports magazine of the Ottoman Empire. He is considered one of the founders of the Armenian Olympics and the Homenetmen Armenian sports organization. He was a victim of the Armenian genocide.

== Life ==
Of Armenian descent, Shavarsh Krissian was born in the Beşiktaş district of Constantinople on 22 July 1886. He studied at the local Makruhyan Armenian school and continued his education at the prestigious Reteos Berberian school in the Üsküdar district. He later studied and graduated from the Robert College. In 1905 Krissian continued his education in London and the Lycée Janson de Sailly in Paris. On 19 July 1909, he returned to Constantinople and began teaching physical education at local Armenian schools.

=== Marmnamarz ===
In February 1911 Shavarsh Krissian published the Marmnamarz (Armenian: "Body of national physical training") which became the first sports periodical of the Ottoman Empire. The Marmnamarz was a monthly periodical that provided the necessary information regarding sports events, news, and the results of competitions. The magazine also published photographs of various Armenian athletes throughout the world. In the periodical Krissian established the concept of Armenian Olympics. Marmnamarz eventually became an important contributor to the development of sports and athletic activity within the Armenian community of the Ottoman Empire. The periodical suspended its activity in 1914 due to World War I and ultimately ceased publication after Krissian fell victim to the Armenian genocide.

=== Homenetmen ===
Though Homenetmen was formally established in 1918, three years after the death of Shavarsh Krissian, he is still considered one of its founding members. The idea and founding principals of Homenetmen was first developed by Krissian. He was instrumental in the establishment of the Armenian Olympics, which held its first competition on 1 May 1911. Prior to World War I, there were about forty Armenian athletic clubs in Constantinople alone. The Armenian Olympic committee's by-laws were eventually incorporated into Homenetmen.

=== Armenian genocide ===
On 24 April 1915, Shavarsh Krissian was one of the Armenian notables deported into the interior provinces of the Ottoman Empire as part of the Armenian genocide. He was sent to the Ayaş prison in the province of Ankara. During his prison sentence, Krissian organized gymnastic exercises. However, once news reached the deportees of Ayaş about the 20 Hunchakian gallows of 15 June 1915, the atmosphere in the prison was abruptly changed. The prison guards viewed the gymnastic exercises with suspicion and severity. Shavarsh Krissian was eventually rounded up and killed in the outskirts of Ankara.

== See also ==
- Armenian Sport in the Ottoman Empire
- Deportation of Armenian notables in 1915
