= Softa =

Student in the first six grades of the Ottoman madrasa system

According to the Encyclopaedia of Islam, Second Edition written by English historian and Orientalist C.E. Bosworth, the term "softa" (ṣofta) was a name given to students in the fields of theology, law and other sciences within the madrasa educational system of the Ottoman Empire. A parallel form can be found in Persian, pronounced as sūkhte, meaning "in flames" or "to set on fire", i.e. consumed by the love of God or learning. However, the relationship between the two words is unclear.

More specifically, "softa" seems to have been used to refer to beginners within their fields of science or theology, where as after they've completed their first courses they're instead referred to as "dānishmend".

== History ==
Starting with Mehmed II, Ottoman sultans established these centers of education to develop a qualified group of individuals that would constitute a strong bureaucracy and fill administrative roles. The cities became intellectual centers of modernization. Through their studies in the madrasa system, softas aimed to become part of the ulama, the class of Muslim religious elites within the Ottoman Empire. The ulama class, especially during the classical period, had significant political and social power and functioned as an avenue of economic advancement. Though they lacked military power, the ulama were able to sway the masses into supporting certain campaigns, influence the actions and rulings of the sultan and be representatives of the population before the state.

Although anyone could enroll in the madrasa system, election to the ulama class became increasingly organized and highly stratified. The softas struggled to compete for positions against those from the city who were born into ulama families or had personal relationships with members of the ulama. These ties, passed down through generations, were central to the recruitment and selection process of the ulama and superseded consideration of a candidate's skill. In fact, those with hierarchical connections were often less trained and educated in religious studies than the softas, and did not need to complete the madrasa system to be elected to a high post. Still, there was a sense of superiority amongst those from the city, and a general conception of the softas as ignorant. Ultimately, an elite class favored by the sultan and largely inaccessible to the softas formed by the 18th century. In order to compete, it was necessary for softas in the madrasas to attach themselves to high bureaucratic officials or esteemed religious figures who could function as their patrons and recommend them for high posts. Yet, even the few softas who managed to enter the ulama after graduating from the madrasa system ultimately constituted the lowest strata within the class, the beldīs. Those who failed to find positions moved back to the countryside to work in lower posts.

As the Ottoman Empire expanded and Istanbul attracted more people, posts within the ulama became more competitive and difficult for softas to secure. The softas also criticized the empire's handling of religious affairs and held to early religious traditions. Starting during the 17th century, they strongly opposed Ottoman attempts for religious reform and modernization. Yet, the religious elites condemned the softas, deeming them ignorant and guilty of misrepresenting the Muslim religion. Specifically, they faulted them with overemphasizing the importance of the afterlife and failing to recognize the equal importance of life on earth, rather than considering it transitory. They said this interpretation simplified the human experience and discouraged hard work. Due to the softas’ frustration with the hierarchical structure of the ulama class as well as their disapproval of the religious operations of the empire, many joined to form an unruly mob that roamed the capital.

Starting in the 16th century, the softas led several uprisings, threatening the stability of the Ottoman state. Many softas who graduated and remained unemployed joined the Janissary army to engage in the revolts. Riots by softas were also frequent in Constantinople during the second half of the nineteenth century, most notably in 1853, 1859 and 1876. Shortly thereafter, though, the influence of this mob as a force of political disturbance diminished, as the madrasa system was replaced by the development and expansion of modern schools.
