= Armenian education in the Ottoman Empire =

Beginning with the 1863 education has been offered to the whole people, and so far as funds permit is absolutely free for all. All Armenian education is under the direction of lay committees. During this period in Russian Armenia the association of the schools with the Church is rather closer, but the same principle obtains. This became a problem for Russian administration, which was peaked during 1897, Tsar Nicholas appointed the Armenophobic Grigory Sergeyevich Golitsin as governor of Transcaucasia, and Armenian schools, cultural associations, newspapers and libraries were closed.

The Armenian charitable works, hospitals, and provident institutions we were organized along the explained perspective. The Armenians, in addition to paying taxes to the State, have voluntarily imposed extra burdens on themselves in order to support such philanthropic agencies. The taxes to the State did not have direct return to Armenians in such cases.

The education and philanthropic agencies made the Armenians most educated and rich section of the Ottoman population.

There existed over 1,996 Armenian schools with 173,022 pupils before World War I.

The following table is the list of Armenian schools in the Ottoman Empire gives the number and statistics of Armenian schools for each geographical district in the Ottoman Empire in 1912.

Sanjak	Number of Schools	Number of Students
Sivas (Sebastia)	119	10,988
Amasya (Amasia)	31	3,396
Şebinkarahisar (Koghonia)	36	3,040
Tokat (Yevdokia)	18	3,175
Erzurum (Karin)	211	13,741
Erzincan (Yerznka)	61	4,768
Doğubeyazıt (Daroynk)	50	2,839
Diyarbakır (Dikranagerd)	71	4,305
Maden	38	3,650
Mardin	13	1,705
Elazığ (Kharpert)	129	11,064
Tunceli (Dersim)	47	2,178
Malatya (Malatia)	28	2,390
Bitlis (Baghesh)	45	2,391
Muş (Mush)	135	5,669
Siirt (Sghert)	22	974
Bingöl (Chapaghjur)	5	275
Van	188	N/A
Hakkâri (Julamerg)	4	N/A
Six vilayets (Western Armenia)	1,047	55,949
Maraş (Marash/Germanik)	37	2,584
Antep (Aintab)	26	5,380
Urfa (Urha/Yedesia)	20	N/A
Antakya (Antiok)	30	487
Adana	25	2,755
Kozan (Sis)	20	1,879
Osmaniye (Jebelbereket)	18	1,200
Çukurova (Kilikia)	176	14,285
Istanbul (Constantinople)	64	25,000
Edirne (Adrianople)	6	565
Tekirdağ (Rodosto)	9	1,873
East Thrace (Trakia)	79	27,438
İzmit (Nicomedia)	53	7,480
Bursa (Prusa)	20	2,078
Bilecik	10	1,263
Kütahya	5	1,174
Afyonkarahisar	7	850
Balıkesir	8	1,334
İzmir (Smyrna)	27	2,935
Konya	26	4,585
Ankara (Angora)	24	3,889
Kayseri (Kesaria)	56	7,119
Yozgat	42	9,300
Kırşehir	4	990
Anatolia	282	42,997
Trabzon (Trebizond)	116	6,000
Gümüşhane	3	800
Samsun (Amisos)	71	2,454
Sinop	18	2,500
Pontus	208	11,754
TOTAL	1,996	173,022

== See also ==
Historical topics:

- Ottoman Armenia
- Education in the Ottoman Empire

Modern topics:

- Education in Turkey
- Education in Armenia
- List of Armenian Schools worldwide
