= Artin Dadyan Pasha =

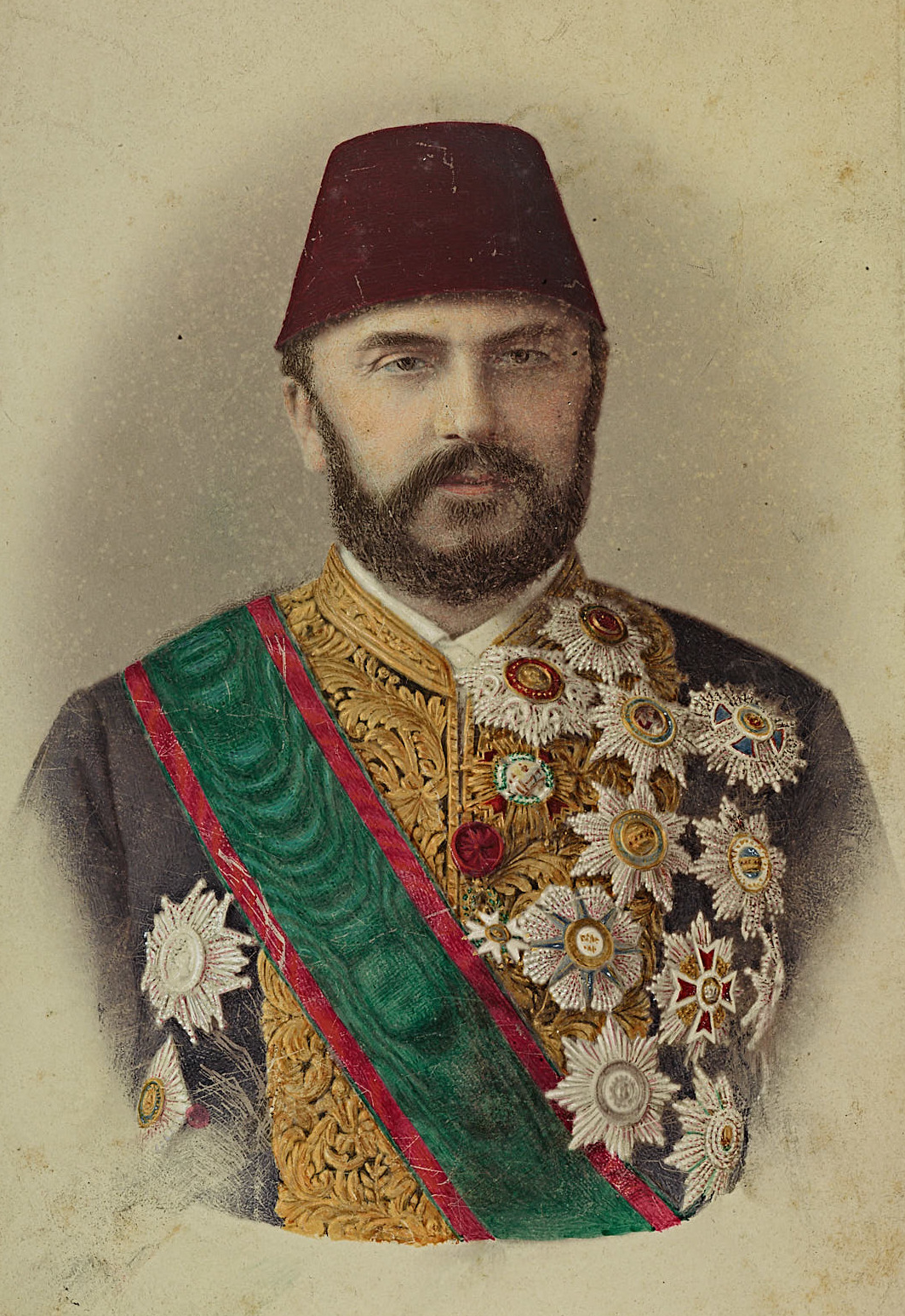

Artin Dadyan Pasha (Ottoman Turkish: آرتین دادیان پاشا; 1830–1901) was Deputy Secretary of State for Foreign Affairs in the Ottoman Empire from 1880 until 1901, one of the highest ranking Armenians in the Ottoman state.

He was the son of an Ottoman civil servant, and members of his family had held important government positions for generations. He was educated at the Sorbonne in Paris and spent his career in an array of positions in the Sultan's service. He was promoted the Undersecretary of Foreign Affairs in 1880, and held that title until his death in 1901. In 1885 he was granted the title pasha. In 1899 he was assigned to approach the Armenian Revolutionary Federation to discuss peace. He sent his son Diran Bey Dadian to negotiate with the Armenian exiles in Switzerland.
