= Armenian Sport in the Ottoman Empire =

Armenian Sport in the Ottoman Empire refers to the development and later decline of sporting activities and clubs organized by the Armenian population inside the territories and control of the Ottoman Empire.

The development of Armenian sport and gymnastics in the Ottoman Empire began in the late 19th century, when the first athletic clubs and societies were established. Under the rule of the Sultan, engagement in sports or athletics was strictly forbidden and those who broke this law were punished.

== Sports as the National Spirit ==
Abdul Hamid II, sultan of the Ottoman Empire between 1876 and 1909, tried to fight the advantages European power had over them by modernizing the Empire and creating a national identity. His efforts to pursue unity and nationalism included suppressing other nationalisms inside the Empire, and the Armenians were one of the main minorities affected by this.

Sports and physical activities in general were considered relevant for Armenian nationalism since the second half of 19th century, receiving institutional support by the Armenian Educational Council (central school organization for the Armenian millet) since 1853, and the United Armenian Organization (an Armenian philanthropic organization with educational objectives) in the late 19th century.

The youth was considered to be the “future” of the Armenian nation, but the push of Ottoman identity and general restrictions of public gatherings and club formation were big obstacles for Armenian juveniles. However, Ottoman identity lost relevance in favor of Turkish after the 1908 Young Turk revolution, giving Armenians the possibility to identify as specifically Armenians, and develop their national identity separately. Additionally, sultan Abdul Hamid II was forced to restore the 1876 constitution, lifting most restrictions on public sports.

== First clubs ==
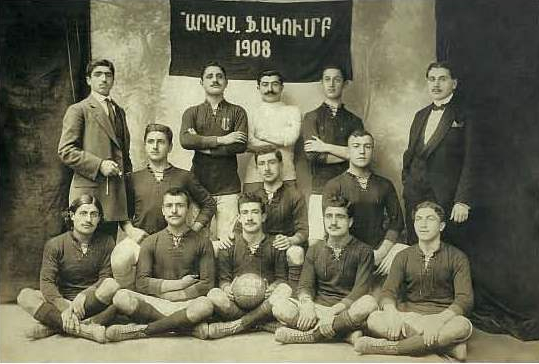
Araks Football Club, Constantinople, 1908

The first Armenian football clubs inside the Ottoman Empire are said to be Armenia and Vaspurakam, formed in the city of Smyrna in 1900. Later in 1901, a community instructor known as A. Elmasian managed to gather more than a hundred people for an athletic show in Smyrna, disguising the event as an educational activity rather than a competition to avoid calling the attention of the regime.

The first Armenian football team, called Balta - Liman (in the neighbourhood of Baltalimanı, near Constantinople) was established by Shavarsh Krissian, (famous Armenian author and athlete) around 1906. That same year, the team participated in the first game ever between an Armenian and a Turkish football club, defeating historic team Galatasaray. Other notorious teams formed before the 1910s were Araks and Tork.

Before the beginning of World War I, there were about 40 Armenian athletic clubs just in Constantinople, and Armenian football teams took part in team and international tournaments and several leagues in the capital. There were also multiple relevant teams outside of the capital. The most famous team from Smyrna was Hay Vorsordats Club ("The Armenian Hunters' club"). Armenian sport clubs were also established in Nicomedia (İzmit), Erzurum, Marzvan (Merzifon), Samson, Adana, Van, Caesarea (Kayseri), Dortyol (Dörtyol), Trapizon (Trabzon), and Konya, among others.

== Armenia within the Olympic Games ==
Shavarsh Krissan, the founding editor of the first sports magazine in the Ottoman Empire, Marmnamarz (Armenian: Մարմնամարզ, meaning "Sport") paved the way for Armenian youth athletes to take up sports. He was deemed as an advocate for physical fitness, gymnastics and competitive athletics for Armenian youths to foster national resilience. Vahram Papazyan and Mkrtich Mkryan were a few of the Armenian competitors who debuted under his coaching, being the first Armenians to represent Ottoman Turkey in the Olympic Games (specifically the 1912 Summer Olympics in Stockholm). He is also the one behind the idea of organizing Olympic Games in Armenia.

From 1911 to 1914, four Pan-Armenian Olympic Games were held in Constantinople. During the Games, records were set and the winners were awarded with silver medals. The first edition was held on May 1, 1911 in the Union Club-İttihat Spor stadium of Constantinople. Almost 2000 people attended, alongside them many Armenian sports groups. In 1914, Armenia also held the first "Cilician Olympic Games" in the southern region of Cilicia, stimulating sport developments outside of Constantinople.

== Impact of the Armenian genocide ==
From 1915 to 1920, many Armenian sportsmen became victims of the Armenian genocide carried out by the Committee of Union and Progress, and most Armenian sports clubs and intellectuals were affected. In 1915 nearly all Armenian sports clubs and unions were shut down. Among those killed was Shavarsh Krissian, who was exiled to Ayaş with a group of Istanbul Armenian intellectuals and shortly afterwards killed. After his death, Marmnamarz ceased publication.

After the genocide, thousands of children were left homeless, and found place in orphanages that were funded by international organizations. The scouting and gymnasticics movement of the Armenian General Athletic Union (HAMEU) kept the passion for sports active among children, and Armenians held their own sports competitions within the orphanages, which were under the name of Inter-Orphanage Olympic Games. The games were organized with the support of the Armenian Patriarch of Constantinople, Zaven I Der Yeghiayan, who also participated in the awarding ceremony of the winners. Football still remained as the favorite sport among the Armenian youth, alongside volleyball, basketball and baseball. Some participants of these games later continued to take a sports path in their life.
