= Ohannes Kouyoumdjian =

Ottoman governor of Mount Lebanon from 1912 to 1915

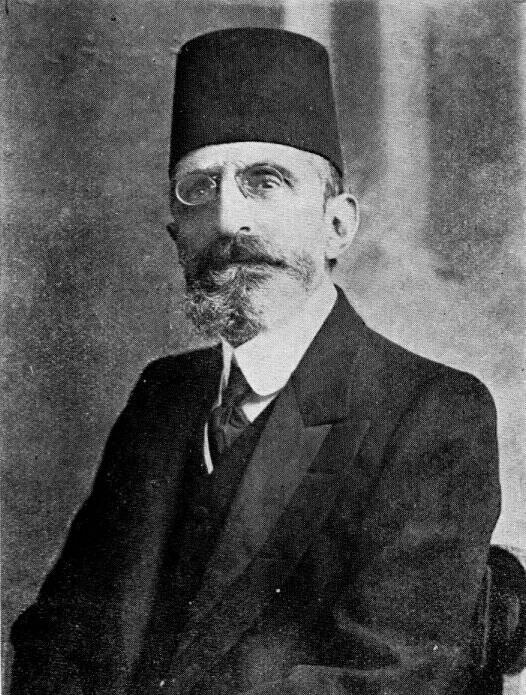
- Ohannes Pasha Kouyoumdjian
- Born: 1852; Istanbul, Ottoman Empire
- Died: 1933 (aged 80–81); Rome, Italy

Ohannes Pasha Kouyoumdjian (1852, Istanbul – 1933, Beirut), known as Ohannes Pasha, Ohannes, Ohannes Kuyumcuyan (Arabic: أوهانس باشا) was a high ranking Ottoman Armenian official, and the last mutasarrif of the Mount Lebanon Mutasarrifate from 1912 until his resignation in 1915.

== Early life ==
Ohanness was born in Istanbul to Bedros Kouyoumdjian, an Armenian Catholic bureaucrat and a protégé of the Mehmed Emin Âli Pasha, the Grand vizier of the Ottoman Empire. The family name suggests that his forebears were jewelers by occupation. Bedros served as director of Forests and Mines, and was later elected as a member of the state council. He married a Lebanese Maronite, the niece of the manager of the Maronite Church legation in Istanbul, and was a candidate for the governorship of the Mount Lebanon Mutasarrifate himself.

== Career ==
Ohannes' career started in the Ottoman Foreign Ministry, he was posted in the Ottoman Embassy in Rome where he served as counselor. He worked as a counselor in the Foreign Ministry in Istanbul until appointment as governor (mutasarrif) of Mount Lebanon. Ohannes was chosen to fill the post from among a number of candidates including a senior inspector from the Ministry of Postage and Telegraph, and a senior counselor from the Revenue Department.

He was raised to the rank of vizier and dispatched to the Mount Lebanon Mutasarrifate for a five-year term, according to the protocol of December 23, 1912, and the imperial decree of December 23, 1912. His appointment Firman included amendments to the Organic Statute, the most important of which were not limiting the election of members of the administrative council to elders, the participation of the people in this election through delegates, and the approval of plans for the construction of three new ports in Lebanon (in Jounieh, Nabi Younis, and Chekka).

== Resignation ==
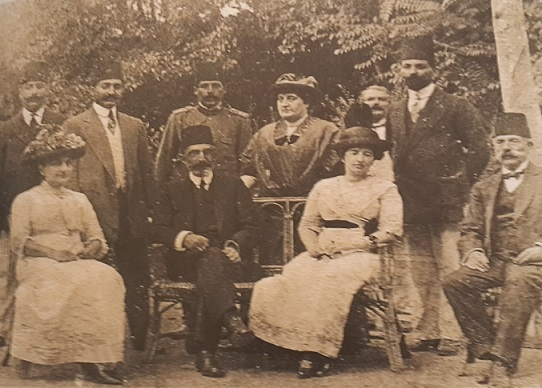
Kouyoumdjian and his family

Ohannes was the eighth and the last Christian mutasarrif of Mount Lebanon. He abdicated in June 1915, because he refused to work under Djemal Pasha, the Turkish military leader and then Prime Minister, who harbored anti-Armenian sentiments.

In his memoirs, Ohannes wrote that Djemal made his tenure as mutasarrif untenable. Djemal however refused his resignation, and ordered Ohannes to renew the administrative council of the mutasarrifate, and to ensure that members sympathizing or supporting the Allied Powers be replaced with appointees who would be "elected" with his approval. This meant the de facto abrogation of autonomous of Mount Lebanon. Ohannes attempted to resist by tendering his resignation, which was initially ignored and then accepted. On 11 July 1915, the Ottoman government formally annulled the mutasarrifate governorship protocols. Thereafter, the Interior Ministry appointed Turkish, non-Christian governors of Mount Lebanon.

== Character ==
Ohanness was described as a fair governor and reformer.
