= Bitlis vilayet =

First-level administrative division of the Ottoman Empire

ولایت بتليس Vilâyet-i Bitlis
- Vilayet of the Ottoman Empire
- 1875–1923
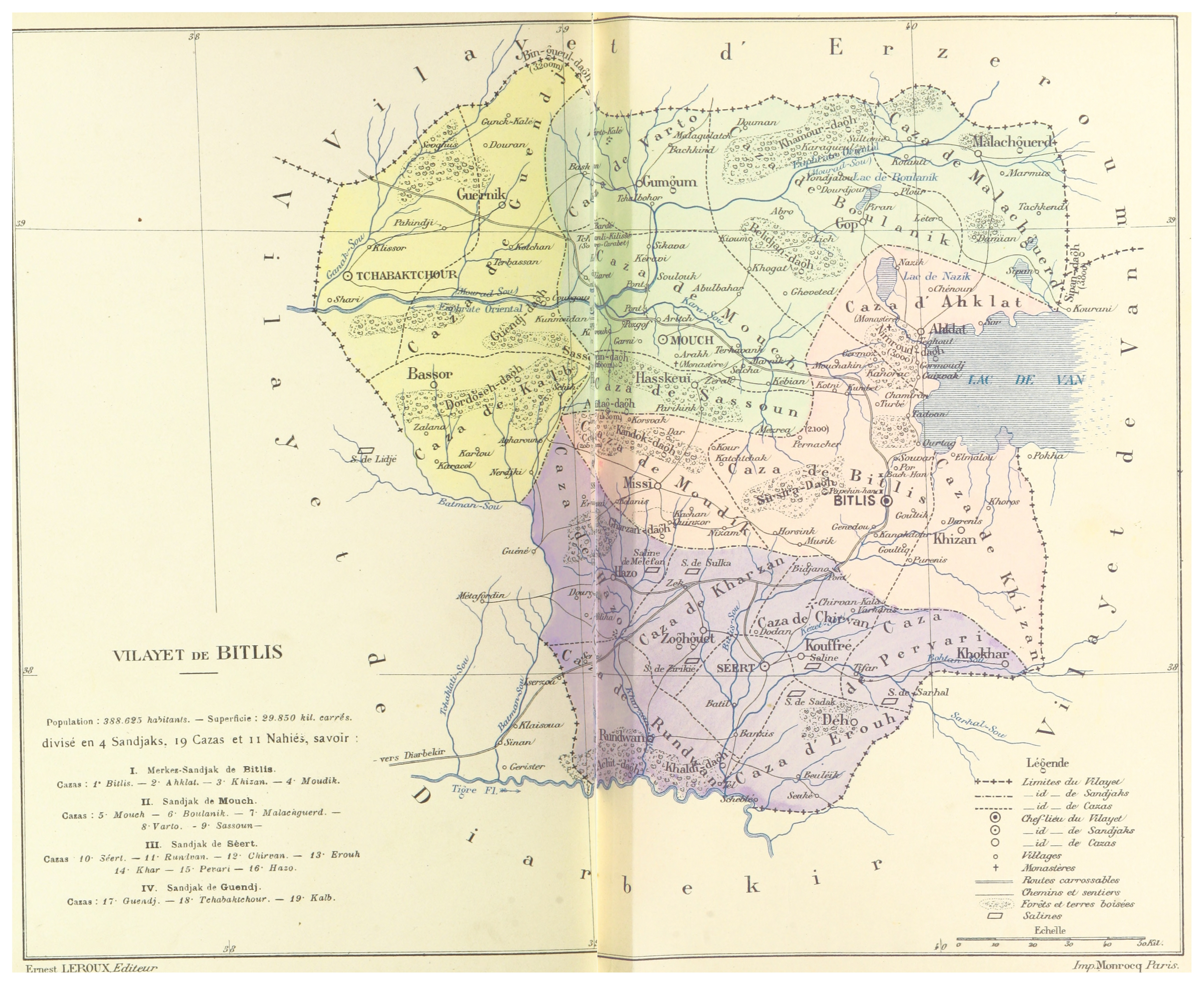
- The Bitlis Vilayet in 1892
- Capital: Bitlis
- Population
  - Muslim, 1914: 309,999
  - Armenian, 1914: 117,492
- History
  - Established: 1875
  - Declaration of the Republic of Turkey: 1923
Preceded by	Succeeded by
Erzurum Eyalet	Bitlis Province
- Today part of: Turkey
- Ethnic groups in the Bitlis Vilayet based on 1914 population statistics for the Ottoman Empire: 1. Muslim (71.0%); 2. Armenian (27.0%); 3. Others (2.00%)

Bitlis Vilayet (Armenian: Բիթլիսի վիլայեթ Bit'lisi vilayet' , Ottoman Turkish: ولایت بتليس Vilâyet-i Bitlis) was a first-level administrative division (vilayet) of the Ottoman Empire. Before the Russo-Turkish War (1877–1878) it had been part of the Erzurum Vilayet, it was then made a separate vilayet by the Sublime Porte. It was one of the six Armenian vilayets of the Empire.

At the beginning of the 20th century, Bitlis Vilayet reportedly had an area of 11,522 square miles (29,840 km^{2}), while the preliminary results of the first Ottoman census of 1885 (published in 1908) gave the population as 388,625. The accuracy of the population figures ranges from "approximate" to "merely conjectural" depending on the region from which they were gathered.

Bitlis and Muş were formerly included in the Eyalet of Erzurum. In 1875, they were detached and made a separate vilayet. The sanjak of Siirt was joined to the vilayet of Bitlis from Diyarbekir Vilayet in 1883–84.

== Administrative divisions ==
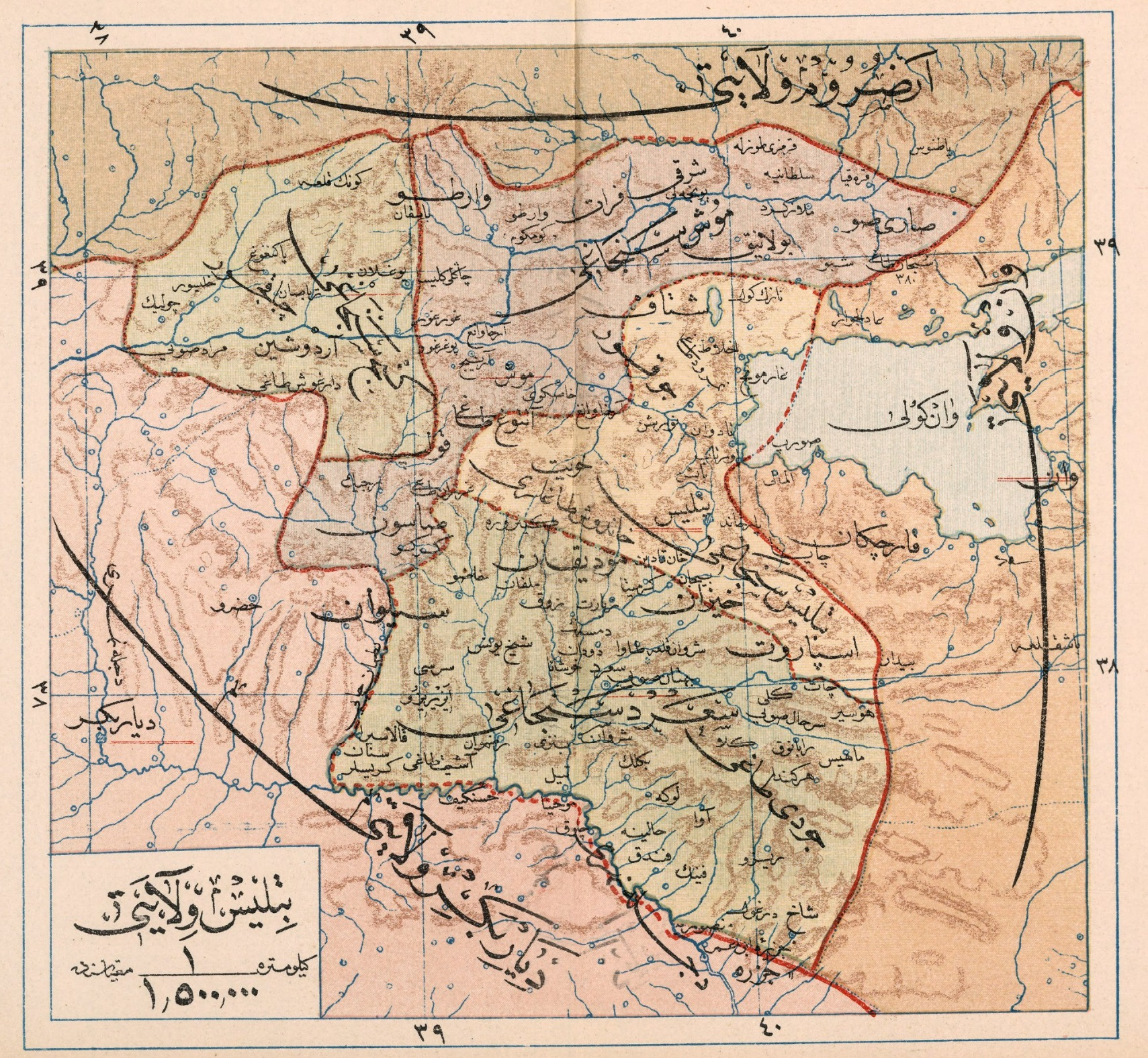
Map of subdivisions of Bitlis Vilayet in 1907

Sanjaks of Bitlis Vilayet:

1. Sanjak of Bitlis (Bitlis, Ahlat, Hizan, Mutki)
2. Sanjak of Muş (Muş, Bulanık, Sason, Malazgirt, Varto)
3. Sanjak of Siirt (Siirt, Eruh, Pervari, Şirvan, Kurtalan)
4. Sanjak of Genç (Genç, Çapakçur, Kulp)
