= Demographics of the Ottoman Empire =

Historical population
Year	Pop.	±%
1520	11,692,000	—
1566	15,000,000	+28.3%
1683	30,000,000	+100.0%
1831	27,230,000	−9.2%
1856	35,350,000	+29.8%
1881–93	17,388,000	−50.8%
1905	20,884,000	+20.1%
1906	20,975,345	+0.4%
1919	14,629,000	−30.3%

The demographics of the Ottoman Empire include population density, ethnicity, education level, religious affiliations and other aspects of the population.

Lucy Mary Jane Garnett stated in the 1904 book Turkish Life in Town and Country, published in 1904, that "No country in the world, perhaps, contains a population so heterogeneous as that of Turkey."

== Census ==
Demographic data for most of the history of the Ottoman Empire is not quite precise. For most of the five centuries of its existence, the empire did not have easily computable valid data except figures for the number of employed citizens. Until the first official census (1881–1893), data was derived from extending the taxation values to the total population. Because of the use of taxation data to infer population size, detailed data for numerous Ottoman urban centers – towns with more than 5,000 inhabitants – is accurate. This data was collaborated with data on wages and prices. Another source was used for the numbers of landlords of households in the Ottoman Empire – every household was assumed to have five residents.

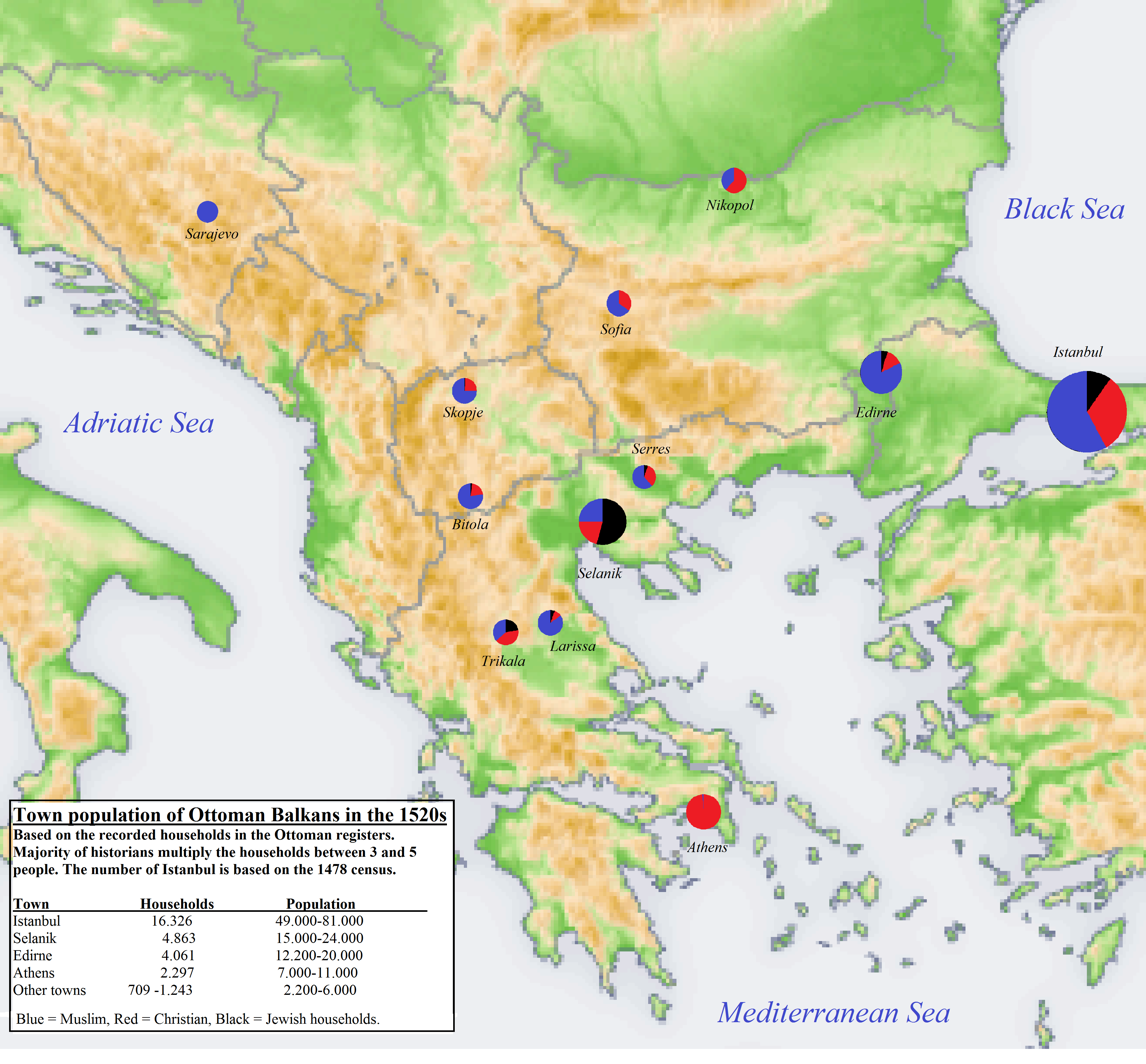
Town population in the Balkans in the 16th century

=== 1831 Ottoman census ===
Entire villages remained uncounted. Taxable population was enumerated, i.e. healthy men over 15 years old. For some settlements the rest of the male population was the majority.

Area	Total	Muslim	E. Orthodox	All Roma (Gypsies)	Jews	Armenians
Total (Of those counted)	3,377,307	1,316,682	1,941,816	93,943	20,636	4,230
Rumeli Eyalet		337,001	686,991	25,126	9,955	2,099
Çatalca rural		848	2,592			
Silivri		887				
Midya		127				
Terkos		794				
Çekmeceıkebır		464				
Çekmeceısagır		403				
Tiirkeşçıttiığı		29				
Tekturdağı		3,773	7,727	57		
Inecik		812	836	24		
Malkara		1,511	4,010	64		
Gelibolu		4,179	6,613			
Şarköy		962	7,752			
Bergos		1,860	3,154	32	51	
Çorlu		971	1,938	45	73	
Marmara Ereğlisi		177	554	24		
Babayiatik		542	1,253			
Havas Mahmutpaşa		684	896			
Hayrabolu		2,203	1,051			
Evreşe		666	956	39		
Inoz		274	2,327	62		
Keşan		850	4,557	72		
Çisriergene		1,929	8,886			
Ipsala		955	1,512			
Edirne		18,487	16,789	750	1,541	1,443
Ada rural		1,090	5,214			
Çdke rural		1,990	4,803			
Üsküdar and Manastır rural		2,333	17,040			
Tırfelli rural			181			
Çisri Muştafa Paşa		914	1,329			
Çirmen		1,910	1,262			
Çirpan		938	4,619			
Ahlçelebi		6,080	4,107			
Akçakizanllk		7,195	8,097	748		
Zağraiatık		5,586	12,782			
Dimetoka		7,525	10,852			
Ferecık		2,385	3,473			
Meğri		692	833			
Gumülcine		30,517	5,339	1,712		
Yenıceikerasu		7,582	2,540	1,273		
Uzuncaabat Hasköy		9,941	10,118	633		
Sultanyeri		6,251	51	89		
Drama		8,618	3,077	1,007		
Cığlacik and San Şaban		4,986	131	54		
Tırnova		3,051				
Hutaliç rural		7,543				
Torluk rural		5,108				
Sahra rural		2,678				
Filibe		10,920	44,959	2,021	344	344
Pazarcik		3,269	14,083	3,653	119	
Ihtaman		408	1,501	83		
Sofya		4,161	39,692	886		
Şehirköy		1,341	27,643	379		
Pravişte		4,718	2,596	259		
Bereketlu		967	170			
Kavala		1,514	102			
Berkofca		1,125	13,549	382		
Cuma Pazari		3,733	916			
Egri Bucak		1,482	1,294			
Çarşamba		2,350	1,717			
Serfıce		682	2,260			
Tikveş		4,454	6,104			
Petriç		3,893	3,869			
Radovişte		3,504	4,907			
Nevrekop		8,539	8,620	739		
Melnik		918	4,182	260		
Timurhisar		3,229	6,611	494		
Zihne		2,867	10,017	642		
Siroz		4,459	16,596	1,761	248	
Selanik		12,368	2,1669	511	5,667	
Yenice Vardar		6,811	4,766			
Vodine		3,996	3,883			
Karaferiye		1,680	11,052			
Ağustos		151	737			
Perzinek		215	4,436			
Iznebol		131	5,152	151		
Ustrumca		3,674	5,344	546		
Toyran		4,631	3,076	334		
Karadağ		2,722	1,452	108		
Avrathisar		3,176	6,949	332		
Dupniçe		3,528	11,642			
Radomir		789	7,211			
Ivraca		1,463	14,282	262		
Kratova, Ivraniye, Palangai, Eğridere		4,749	21,068	627		
Vidin, Akçar, Karalom, Belgratçik, Çunarka, Godgoskaca and Esterlik rural		6,695	24,846	1,289		
Köprülü		4,767	12,718	390		
Perlepe		3,683	14,489	450		
Samokov		816	11,973	11	94	
Köstendil		3,032	14,070	232	145	
Behişte		3,202	2,176	89		
Kesriye		3,313	16,124	335		
Persepe		568	2,162			
Manastir		6,723	24,550	705	1,163	
Florina		5,596	5,253	365		
Istrova		1,658	1,176	57		
Hotpeşte		2,081	3,630	43		
Nasliç		2,693	5,748	275		
Iştip		6,920	9,826			
Koçana		3,374	6,112			
Kumanova		2,276	10,819			
Silistre Eyalet		150,970	96,342	8,779	178	
Niğbolu Sancak		110,304	81,489	5,804	178	
Selvı		7,734				
Izladi		2,580				
Etripolu		545				
Lofça		12,404				
Plevne		6,031				
Rahova		1,831				
Sipre		235				
Niğbolu		3,893	8,598	1,190		
Ziştovi		3,897	5,760	629		
Rusçuk		1,6165	7,196	1,437		
Yanbolu		1,942	1,507			
Nevahii Yanbolu		1,444	1,237			
Zağraicedıt		3,292	4,745			
Yenicei Kızılağaç, Hatunili		499	1,502			
Niš		1,862	18,378	575	178	
Prizren		9,488	2,867	366		
Yehud		2,768	2,479	44		
Tırguvişte		2,404	2,323	3		
Gude		7,574		100		
Usküp		9,660	11,700	900		
Kalkandelen		11,766	8,043	472		
Kirçova		2,286	5,154	88		
Silistre Sancak		40,666	14,853	2975		
Varna		3,427	1,573	167		
Isakçi		553	605	39		
Minkalye		694	15	37		
Balçik and Kuvarna		1766	630	125		
Karkkala rural			52			
Maçin		991	821	25		
Köstence		1,417	386	41		
Hırsova		1,391	986	21		
Tulça		472	592	19		
Kannabad		5,065	1,454	358		
Babadağ		1,171	1,661	38		
Doskasri		1,114	596	273		
Aydos		5,790	845	449		
Yenipazar		3482	948	300		
Pravadı		4,530	1,465	231		
Umurfakih		1,140		146		
Kozluca		1,840	1,163	146		
Pazarcık		3,515	761	287		
Çardak		2,308	300	223		
Republic of Bulgaria borders		181,455	296,769	1,7474	702	344

=== 1844 Ottoman census ===
District	Muslims
Rumelia	29%

=== 1881–1893 Ottoman census ===
The first official census (1881–1893) took 10 years to finish. In 1893 the results were compiled and presented. This census is the first modern, general and standardized census accomplished not for taxation nor for military purposes, but to acquire demographic data. The population was divided into ethno-religious and gender characteristics. Numbers of both male and female subjects are given in ethno-religious categories including Muslims, Greeks (including Asia Minor Greeks, Pontic Greeks, and Caucasus Greeks, all Orthodox Christians under the Greek Orthodox Patriarchate of Constantinople from extremely distinct ethnic origin), Armenians, Bulgarians, Catholics, Jews, Protestants, Latins, Syriacs and Roma.

In 1867 the Council of States took charge of drawing population tables, increasing the precision of population records. They introduced new measures of recording population counts in 1874. This led to the establishment of a General Population Administration, attached to the Ministry of Interior in 1881–1882. These changes politicized the population counts.

Population maps 1893–96

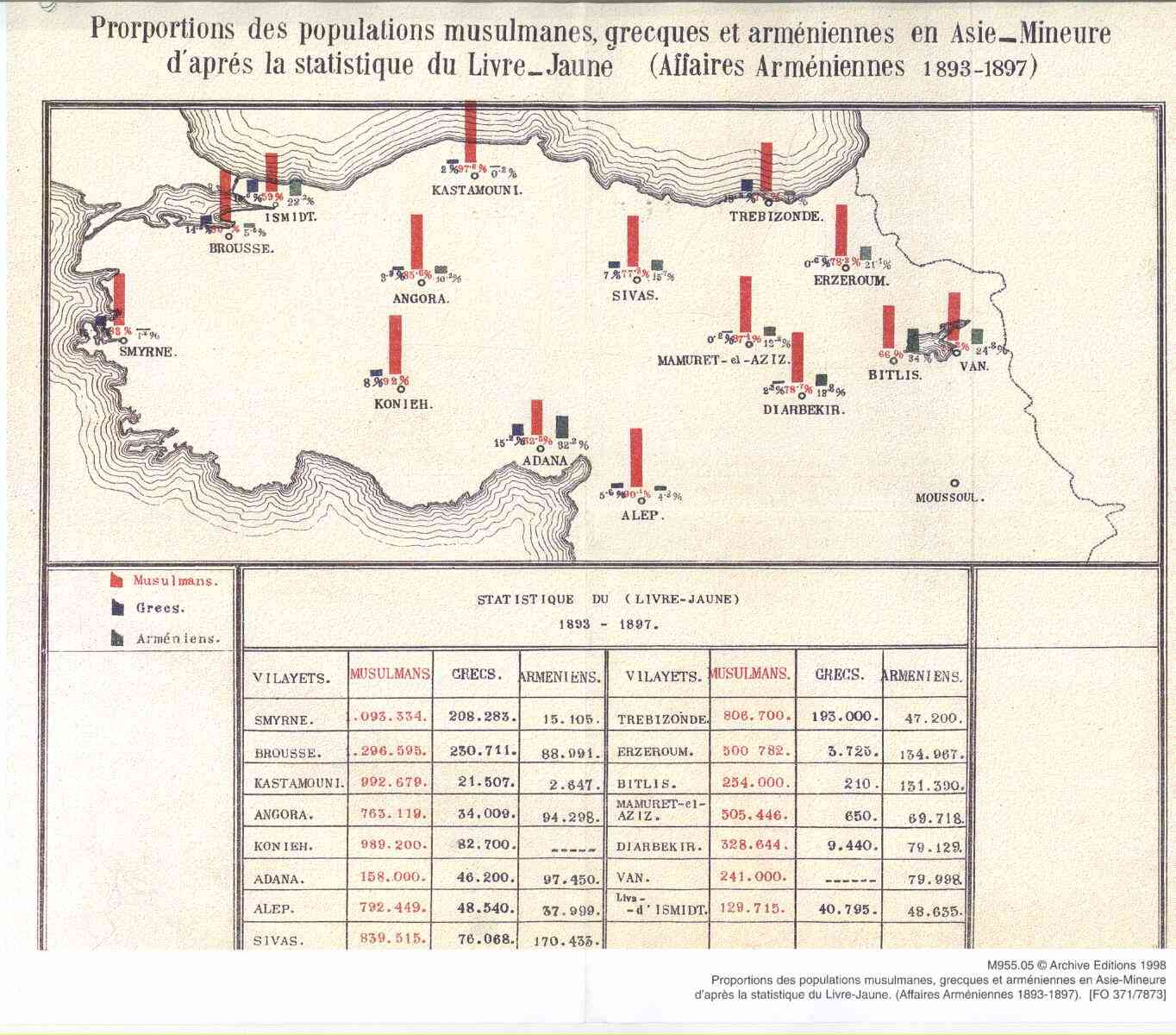
1893–96, Muslim, Greek and Armenian population

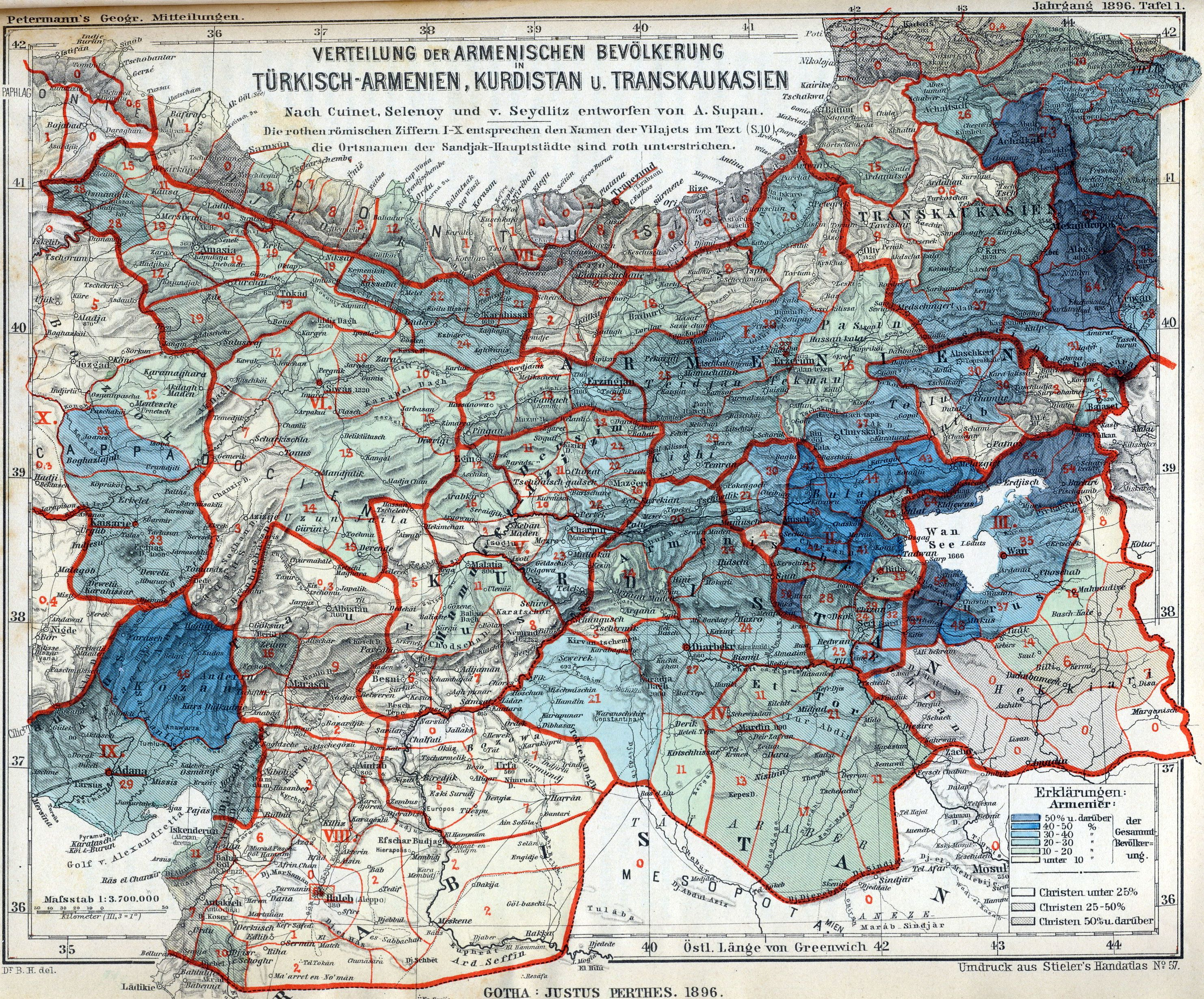
1893–96, Armenian distribution (in color)

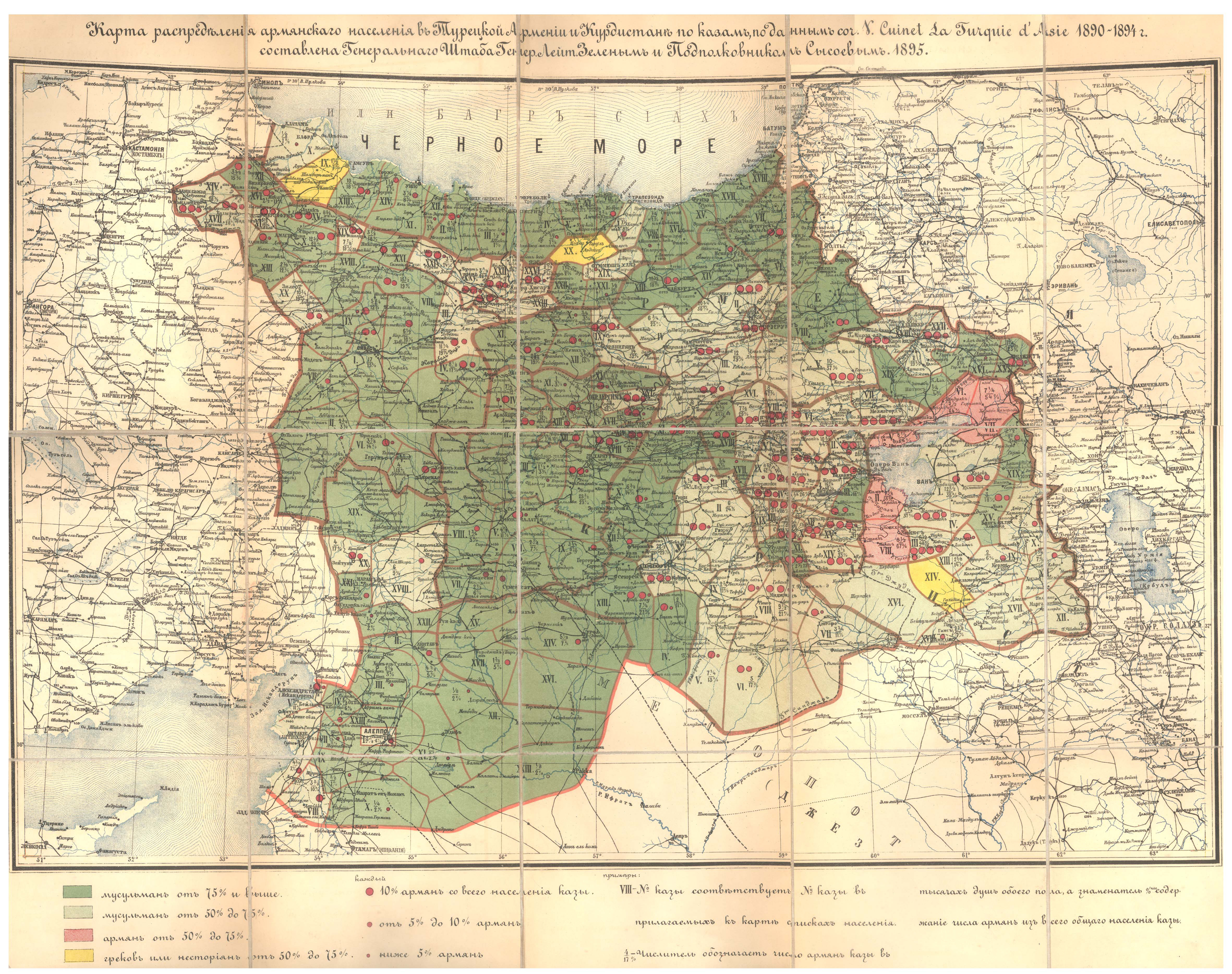
1893–96, Green shows Muslim majority, red shows Armenian majority.

Ottoman Census Values
Administrative Unit	Total Pop	Armenian Pop	Armenian %
Van Vilayet	132,007	55,051	41.70%
Bitlis Vilayet	338,642	108,050	31.91%
Izmit	228,443	44,953	19.68%
Erzurum Vilayet	637,015	120,147	18.86%
Dersaadet	903,482	166,185	18.39%
Vilayet of Mamuret-ul-Aziz	466,579	83,394	17.87%
Diyarbekir Vilayet	414,657	60,175	14.51%
Sivas Vilayet	980,876	129,085	13.16%
Adana Vilayet	398,764	36,695	9.20%
Halep Vilayet	819,238	70,663	8.63%
Ankara Vilayet	1,018,744	81,437	7.99%
Hüdavendigar Vilayet	1,454,294	70,262	4.83%
Trabzon Vilayet	1,164,595	49,782	4.27%
Sehremanati Mülhakati	88,306	3,074	3.48%
Edirne	985,962	18,458	1.87%
Çatalca	61,001	979	1.60%
Biga	143,904	1,842	1.28%
Konya	1,022,834	10,972	1.07%
Aydin	1,478,424	15,229	1.03%
Zor	51,270	474	0.92%
Kastamonu	968,884	6,652	0.69%
Kudüs	258,860	1,610	0.62%
Beyrut	620,763	2,921	0.47%
Suriye	551,135	1,478	0.27%
Selanik	1,038,953	51	0.00%
Cezayir-i Bahri Sefid	286,736	10	0.00%
Manastir	711,466	22	0.00%
		1,139,651	

=== 1905–1906 Ottoman census ===
Population maps 1905–1906, 1914

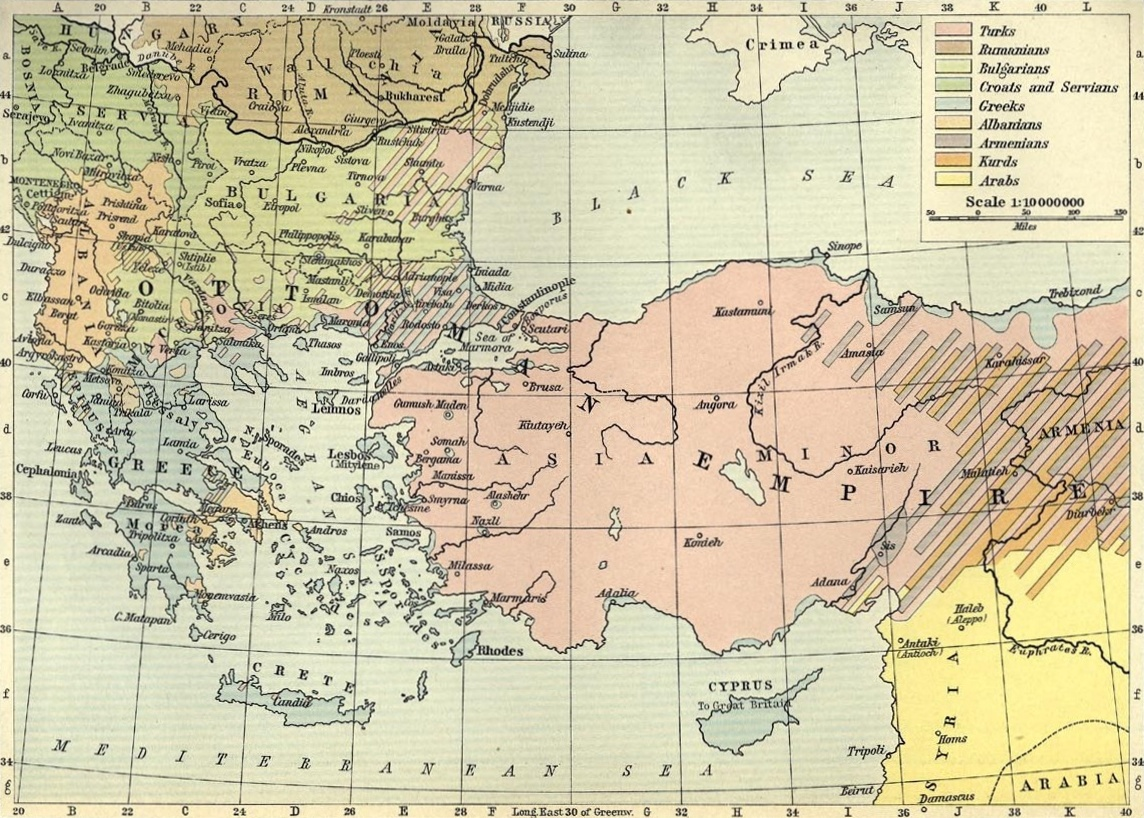
1905–1906 (printed in 1911)

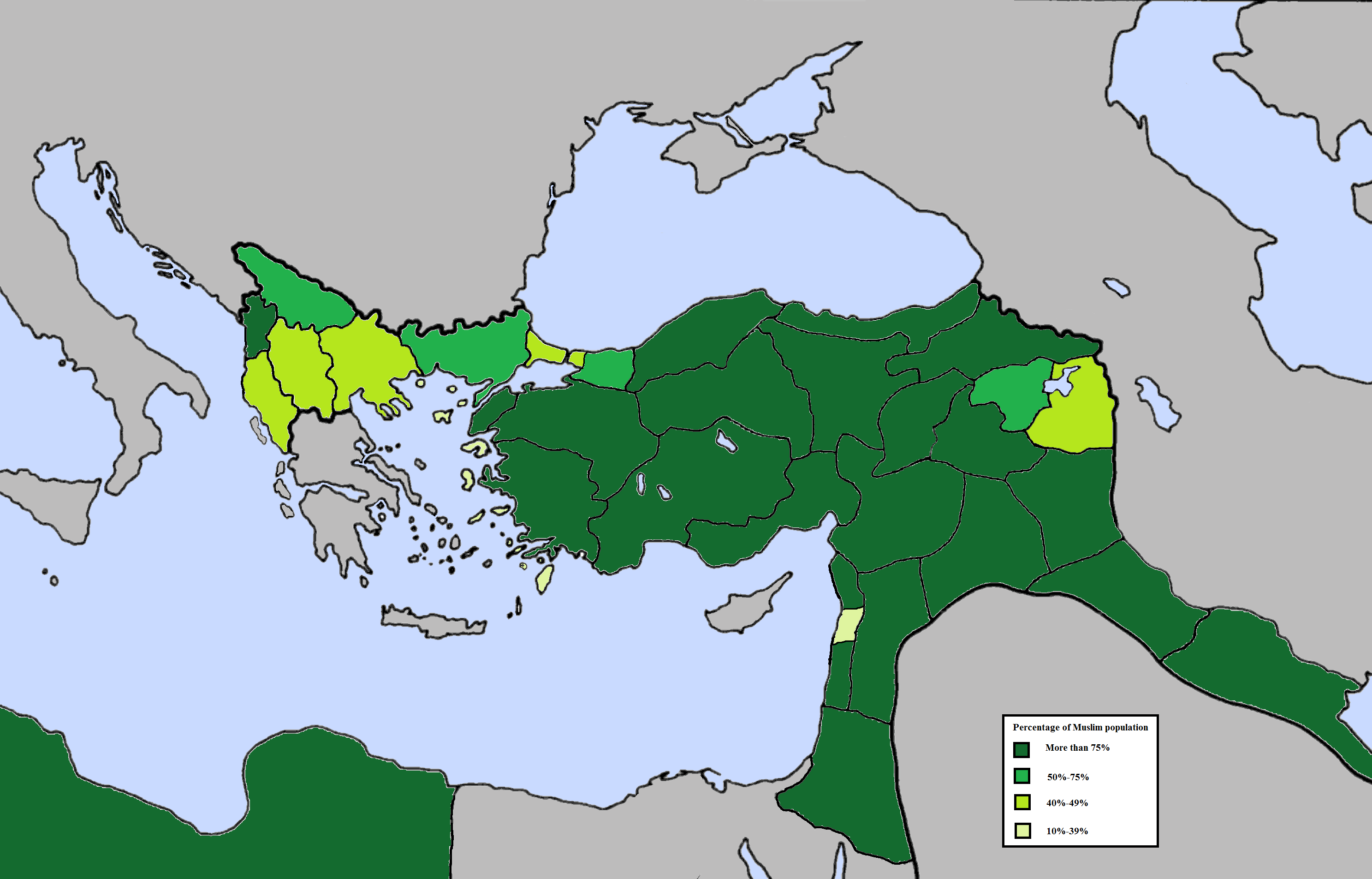
Muslim population in the Ottoman vilayets (1907)

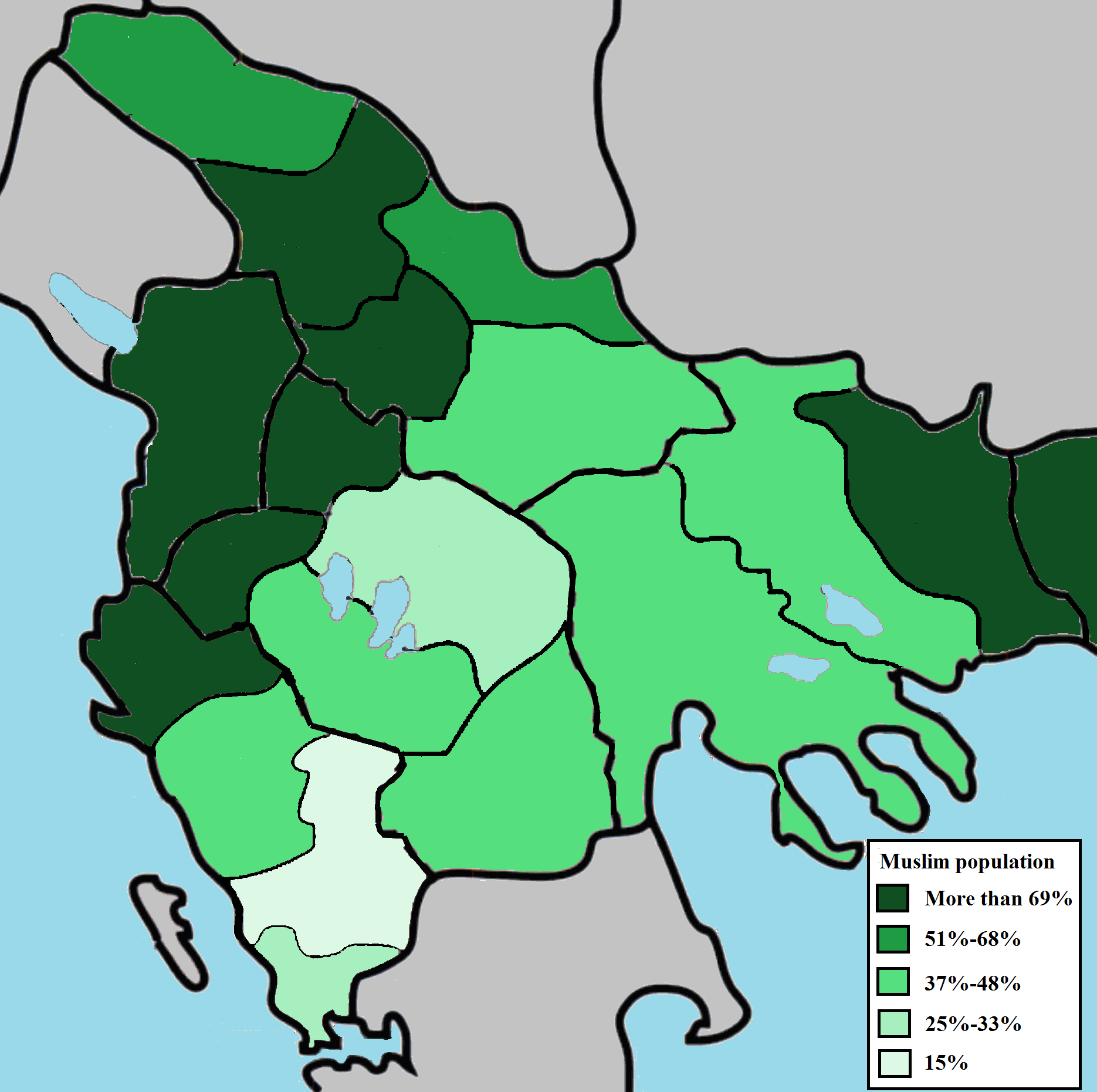
Muslim population in the Ottoman sanjaks

After 1893 the Ottoman Empire established a statistics authority (Istatistik-i Umumi Idaresi) under which results of another official census was published in 1899.

Istatistik-i Umumi Idaresi conducted a new census survey for which field work lasted two years (1905–06). 2-3 million people in Iraq and Syria remained unregistered and uncounted. As a factual note this survey's complete (total) documentation was not published. Results of regional studies on this data were published later, which were sorted by their publication date. Included in the publication and subsequent ones was the Ottoman Empire's population as of 1911, 1912, and 1914. The substantial archival documentation on the census has been used in many modern studies and international publications. After 1906 the Ottoman Empire began to disband and a chain of violent wars such as the Italo-Turkish War, Balkan Wars and World War I drastically changed the region, its borders, and its demographics.

Population distribution of the Millets in the Ottoman Empire in 1906, according to the official census-
Millet	Inhabitants	% of total
Muslims^{a}	15,498,747 - 15,518,478	76.09% - 74.23%
Greeks^{b}	2,823,065 - 2,833,370	13.86% - 13.56%
Armenians^{c}	1,031,708 - 1,140,563	5.07% - 5.46%
Bulgarians	761,530 - 762,754	3.74% - 3.65%
Jews	253,435 - 256,003	1.24% - 1.23%
Protestants^{d}	53,880	0.26%
Others^{d}	332,569	1.59%
Total	20,368,485 - 20,897,617	100.00%
Notes: ^{a} The Muslim Millet includes all Muslims. The largest of them being Turks, Arabs and Kurds.^{b} The Greek Millet includes all Christians part of the Greek Orthodox Church. This includes Slavs and Albanians.^{c} This includes the various Assyrian Churches.^{d} The first source does not include Protestants and "others".

=== 1914 Ottoman census ===
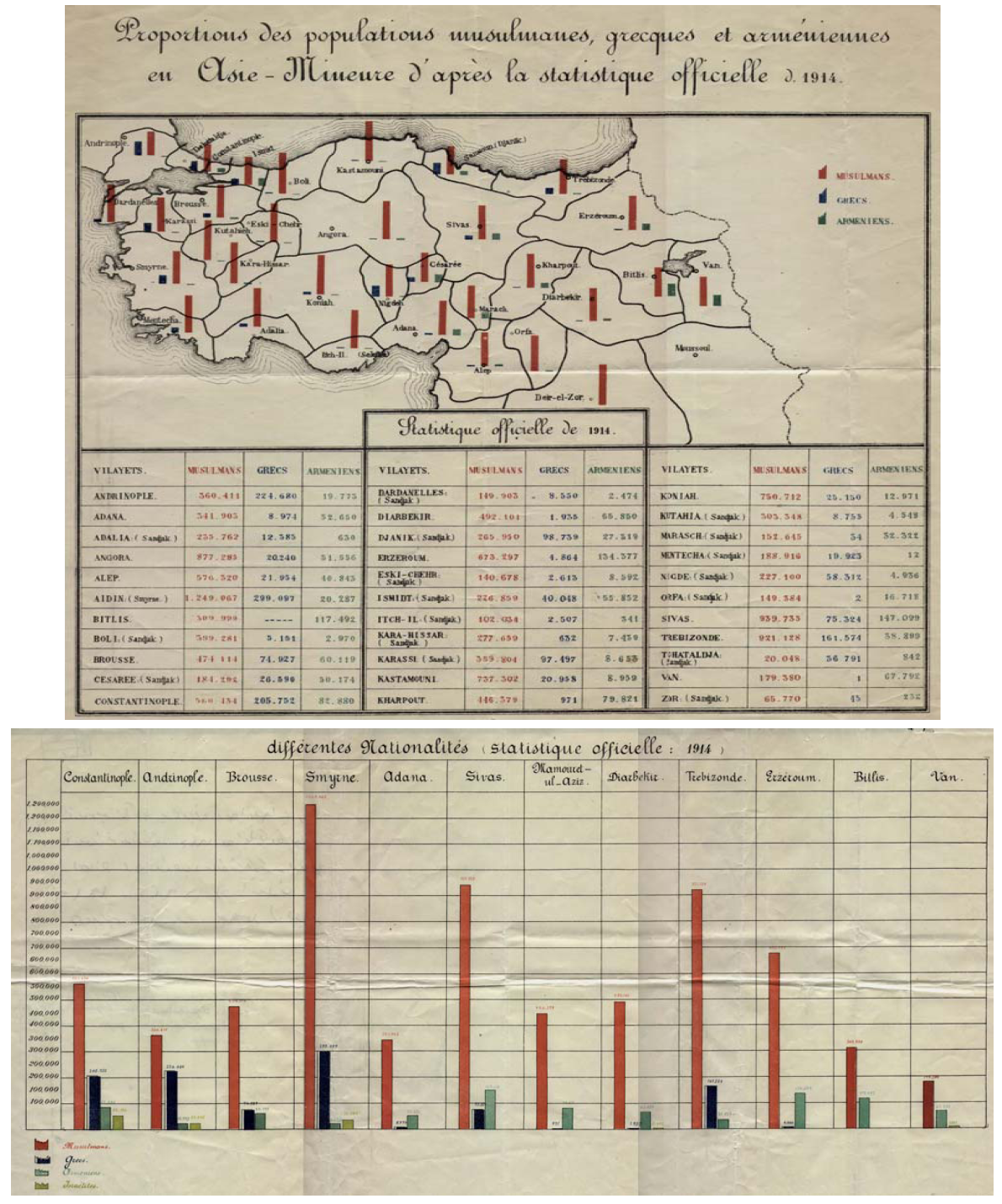
1914, Muslim, Greek and Armenian population

1914 Official Census Values (Male-Female Aggregated)
Province	Muslim	Armenian	Greek
Adana	341.903 (74.8%)	52.650 (13%)	8.974 (2.2%)
Ankara	877.285 (92.5%)	51.556 (5.4%)	20.240 (2.1%)
Antalya	235.762 (95.01%)	630 (.02%)	12.385 (4.97%)
Aydın (İzmir)	1.249.067	20.287	299.097
Bitlis	309.999 (72.5%)	117.492 (27.5%)	0
Bolu	399.281	2.970	5.115
Canik	265.950	27.319	98.739
Çatalca	20.048	842	36.791 (63.78%)
Diyarbekir	492.101	65.850	1.935
Edirne	360.411	19.773	224.680
Erzurum	673.297	134.377	4.864
Eskişehir	140.678	8.592	2.613
Halep	576.320	40.843	21.954
Harput	446.379	79.821	971
Hüdavendigâr	474.114	60.119	74.927
İçil	102.034	341	2.507
İzmit	226.859	55.852	40.048
Kale-i Sultaniye	149.903	2.474	8.550
Kastamonu	737.302	8.959	20.958
Karahisar-ı Sahib	277.659	7.439	632
Karesi	359.804	8.653	97.497
Kayseri	184.292	50.174	26.590
Konya	750.712	12.971	25.150
Kostantiniyye	560.434	82.880	205.752
Menteşe	188.916	12	19.923
Kütahya	303.348	4.548	8.755
Maraş	152.645	32.322	34
Niğde	227.100	4.936	58.312
Sivas	939.735	147.099	75.324
Trabzon	921.128	38.899	161.574
Urfa	149.384	16.718	2
Van	179.380	67.792	1
Zor	65.770	232	45
Total	13.390.000 (83,02%)	1.173.422 (7,28%)	1.564.939 (9,70%)
Total	16.128.361		

=== 1866 Danube Vilayet census ===
In 1865, 658,600 (40,51%) Muslims and 967,058 (59,49%) non-Muslims, including females, were living in the province excluding Niş sanjak and 569,868 (34,68%) Muslims, apart from the immigrants and 1,073,496 (65,32%) non-Muslims in 1859–1860. Half the Muslims were refugees from a population exchange of Christians and Muslims with Russia. Before the establishment of the Danube Vilayet, some 250,000–300,000 Muslim immigrants from Crimea and Caucasus had been settled in this region from 1855 to 1864. Another 200–300,000 male and female Circassian and Crimean Tatar refugees settled in 1862–1878 were to a degree excluded from the 1866 census count.

Male population of the taxable population of the, Danube Vilayet:

1866 census
sancak	Muslim	Non-Muslim
Rusçuk	138,692	95,834
Varna	58,689	20,769
Vidin	25,338	124,567
Sofya	24,410	147,095
Tirnova	71,645	104,273
Tulça	39,133	17,929
Niş	54,510	100,425
Total	412,417	610,892

Percentage of communities in towns from the male population in 1866 according to Ottoman tezkere:

Town	Bulgarians	Muslims	Roma	Armenians	Jews
Vidin	34	52	6		8
Sofya	38	39	4		20
Lom	58	35	3		5
Dupnice	38	46	5		11
Plevne	47	45	5		2
Rusçuk	38	52	2	4	5
Şumnu	40	51	1	5	2
Varna	49	40	1	8	2
Silistre	30	62	2	4	1

In 1873, 17,96% of the population of the province were living in the urban areas.

=== 1874 Danube Vilayet census ===
According to the 1874 census, there were 963,596 (42,22%) Muslims and 1,318,506 (57,78%) non-Muslims in the Danube Province excluding Nış sanjak. Together with the sanjak of Nish the population consisted of 1,055,650 (40,68%) Muslims and 1,539,278 (59,32%) non-Muslims in 1874. Muslims were the majority in the sanjaks of Rusçuk, Varna and Tulça, while the non-Muslims were in majority in the rest of the sanjaks.

=== Eastern Rumelia census ===
Census in Eastern Rumelia of 1878:

Community (1878 census)	Population	Percentage
Bulgarians	571,231	70.3%
Muslims	174,759	21.4%
Greeks	42,516	5.2%
Roma (Gypsies)	19,524	
Jews	4,177	
Armenians	1,306	

Census of Eastern Rumelia in 1880:

Ethnicity (1880 census)	Population	Percentage
Bulgarians	590,000	72.3%
Turks	158,000	19.4%
Roma (Gypsies)	19,500	2.4%
others	48,000	5.9%

The ethnic composition of the population of Eastern Rumelia, according to the provincial census taken in 1884, was the following:

Ethnicity (1884 census)	Population	Percentage
Bulgarians	681,734	70.0%
Turks	200,489	20.6%
Greeks	53,028	5.4%
Roma (Gypsies)	27,190	2.8%
Jews	6,982	0.7%
Armenians	1,865	0.2%

Population of Eastern Rumelia according to the 1880 census:

kaza	Bulgarians	Turks	Greeks	Roma	Jews	Armenians
Plovdiv	127,619	36,848	14,265	4,736	1,185	806
Haskovo	74,656	55,334	1,138	2,116	246	
Stara Zagora	124,666	27,115	35	2,811	431	
Sliven	96,425	12,463	14,184	3,685	845	276
Pazardzhik	94,873	14,898	676	3,487	1,112	152
Burgas	36,997	28,091	11,798	2,686	358	71

=== 1903–1904 census of Salonika Vilayet ===
Population of the Salonika vilayet:

sanjak	Muslims	Greeks	Bulgarians	Vlachs (Note: The term "Vlachs" may refer to either the Aromanians, the Megleno-Romanians, the Romanians, two of the three or all of them at the same time. It is a term originally used by foreign peoples for the Eastern Romance peoples (which also include the Istro-Romanians, who never lived under the Ottoman Empire), although the Megleno-Romanians have come to internalize it as a self-designation.)	Jews
Saloniki	220,000	190,000	85,000	15,000	48,000
Serres	145,000	78,000	130,000	4,000	2,000
Drama	119,000	22,000	4,000		1,000

== Ethnoreligious estimates and registered population ==
=== Eyalets ===
The Muslim population in Silistra subprovince was most numerous (55.17%), while in the Vidin and Nis subprovinces the non-Muslim population constituted 75.59% and 81.18% respectively. Population of the eyalets (Silistra, Vidin and Niş) which constituted the establishment of the Danube Vilayet, according to the 1858 report of the British consul Edward Neale:

Community	Population
Bulgarian Orthodox	910,735 (65%)
Muslim	430,485 (31%)
Vlach	25,000 (2%)
Greek	10,100 (1%)
Jewish	5,000 (0%)
Others	9,535 (1%)
TOTAL	1,390,855 (100%)

=== Danube Vilayet ===
The Danube Province was founded in 1864 and consisted of the subprovinces of Ruse, Varna, Tulcea, Tarnovo, Vidin, Sofia and Niş. Two subprovinces (Sofia and Niş) were separated from the Danube Province, so that Niş sanjak was part of Prizren Vilayet in 1869–1874, while the detached Sofia Province was founded in 1876, and finally both Sofia and Niş were annexed to Adrianople and Kosovo Vilayets respectively in 1877.

The entire population of the province, reached ca. 2,6 million, including 1 million (40%) Muslims and 1.5 million (60%) non-Muslims before the Russo-Turkish War of 1877-1878, with the main national components consisting of Bulgarians and Turks. New large communities of Circassians and Tatars were resettled in the province among the 250,000-300,000 Muslim refugees from Crimea and the Caucasus from 1855 to 1864; however, after the war of 1877–78, both the Muslim and Turkish population dropped by almost half, leaving only 63 Circassians recorded in Bulgaria by 1880.

The male population of the Danube Vilayet (excluding Niş sancak) in 1865, according to Kuyûd-ı Atîk (the Danube Vilayet printing press):

Community	Rusçuk Sanjak	Vidin Sanjak	Varna Sanjak	Tırnova Sanjak	Tulça Sanjak	Sofya Sanjak	Danube Vilayet
Bulgar Millet	85,268 (38%)	93,613 (80%)	9,553 (18%)	113,213 (59%)	12,961 (22%)	142,410 (86%)	457,018 (56%)
Islam Millet	138,017 (61%)	14,835 (13%)	38,230 (74%)	77,539 (40%)	38,479 (65%)	20,612 (12%)	327,712 (40%)
Ullah millet	0 (0%)	7,446 (6%)	0 (0%)	0 (0%)	0 (0%)	0 (0%)	7,446 (1%)
Ermeni Millet	926 (0%)	0 (0%)	368 (1%)	0 (0%)	5,720 (10%)	0 (0%)	7,014 (1%)
Rum Millet	0 (0%)	0 (0%)	2,639 (5%)	0 (0%)	2,215 (4%)	0 (0%)	4,908 (1%)
Yahudi Millet	1,101 (0%)	630 (1%)	14 (0%)	0 (0%)	1 (0%)	1,790 (1%)	3,536 (0%)
Muslim Roma	312 (0%)	245 (0%)	118 (0%)	128 (0%)	19 (0%)	766 (0%)	1,588 (0%)
Non-Muslim Roma	145 (0%)	130 (0%)	999 (2%)	1,455 (1%)	92 (0%)	786 (0%)	3,607 (0%)
TOTAL	225,769 (100%)	116,899 (100%)	51,975 (100%)	192,335 (100%)	59,487 (100%)	166,364 (100%)	812,829 (100%)

The male population of the Danube Vilayet (excluding Niş sanjak) in 1866–1873, according to the editor of the Danube newspaper Ismail Kemal:

Community	Population
MUSLIMS	481,798 (42%)
Established Muslims	392,369 (34%)
Muslim settlers	64,398 (6%)
Muslim Roma	25,031 (2%)
CHRISTIANS	646,215 (57%)
Bulgarians	592,573 (52%)
Greeks	7,655 (1%)
Armenians	2,128 (0%)
Catholics	3,556 (0%)
other Christians	40,303 (4%)
JEWS	5,375 (0%)
NON-MUSLIM Roma	7,663 (1%)
TOTAL Danube Vilayet	1,141,051 (100%)

The male population of the Danube Vilayet (excluding Niş sanjak) in 1868, according to Kemal Karpat:

Group	Population
Christian Bulgarians	490,467
Muslims	359,907

The male population of the Danube Vilayet (excluding Niş sanjak) in 1875, according to Tahrir-i Cedid (the Danube Vilayet printing press):

Community	Rusçuk Sanjak	Vidin Sanjak	Varna Sanjak	Tırnova Sanjak	Tulça Sanjak	Sofya Sanjak	Danube Vilayet
Bulgar Millet	114,792 (37%)	131,279 (73%)	21,261 (25%)	148,713 (60%)	10,553 (12%)	179,202 (84%)	605,800 (54%)
Islam Millet	164,455 (53%)	20,492 (11%)	52,742 (61%)	88,445 (36%)	53,059 (61%)	27,001 (13%)	406,194 (36%)
Ermeni Millet	991 (0%)	0 (0%)	808 (1%)	0 (0%)	3,885 (4%)	0 (0%)	5,684 (1%)
Rum Millet	0 (0%)	0 (0%)	3,421 (4%)	494 (0%)	217 (0%)	0 (0%)	4,132 (0%)
Yahudi Millet	1,102 (0%)	1,009 (1%)	110 (0%)	0 (0%)	780 (1%)	2,374 (1%)	5,375 (0%)
Circassian Muhacirs	16,588 (5%)	6,522 (4%)	4,307 (5%)	0 (0%)	2,954 (3%)	202 (0%)	30,573 (3%)
Muslim Roma	9,579 (3%)	2,783 (2%)	2,825 (3%)	6,545 (3%)	139 (0%)	2,964 (1%)	24,835 (2%)
Non-Muslim Roma	1,790 (1%)	2,048 (1%)	331 (0%)	1,697 (1%)	356 (0%)	1,437 (1%)	7,659 (1%)
Vlachs, Catholics, etc.	500 (0%)	14,690 (8%)	0 (0%)	0 (0%)	15,512 (18%)	0 (0%)	30,702 (3%)
TOTAL	309,797 (100%)	178,823 (100%)	85,805 (100%)	245,894 (100%)	87,455 (100%)	213,180 (100%)	1,120,954 (100%)

The male population of the Danube Vilayet in 1876, according to the Ottoman officer Stanislas Saint Clair:

Community	Population
Turk Muslims	457,018 (36%)
Other Muslims	104,639 (8%)
Bulgarian Christians	639,813 (50%)
Armenian Christians	2,128 (0%)
Vlach and Greek Christians	56,647 (4%)
Roma	8,220 (1%)
Jews	5,847 (0%)
TOTAL Danube Vilayet	1,274,282 (100%)

The total population of the Danube Vilayet (including Niş and Sofia sanjaks), according to the 1876 edition of Encyclopaedia Britannica:

Group	Population
Bulgarians	1,500,000 (63%)
Turks	500,000 (21%)
Tatars	100,000 (4%)
Circassians	90,000 (4%)
Albanians	70,000 (3%)
Romanians	40,000 (2%)
Roma	25,000 (1%)
Russians	10,000 (0%)
Armenians	10,000 (0%)
Jews	10,000 (0%)
Greeks	8,000 (0%)
Serbs	5,000 (0%)
Germans, Italians, Arabs and others	1,000 (0%)
TOTAL Danube Vilayet	2,369,000 (100%)

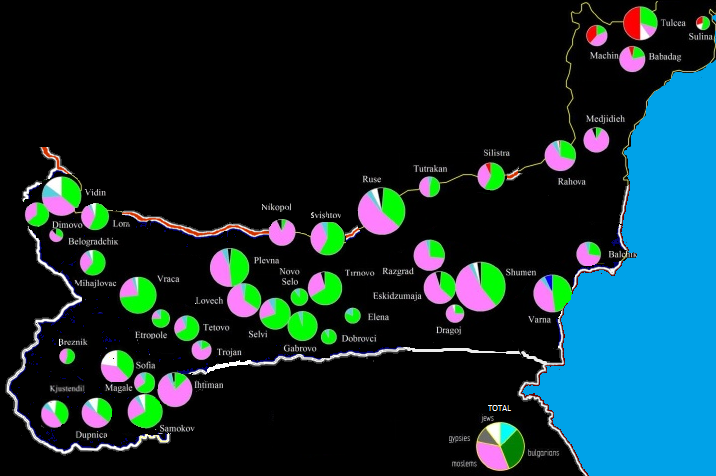
Distribution of the population of towns in the Danube Vilayet in 1876 according to Aubaret (excl. Niş sancak)

The total population of the Danube Vilayet (excluding Niş sanjak) in 1876, estimated by the French consul Aubaret from the register:

Community	Population
MUSLIMS	1,120,000 (48%)
incl. Turks	774,000 (33%)
incl. Circassians	200,000 (8%)
incl. Tatars	110,000 (5%)
incl. Roma	35,000 (1%)
NON-MUSLIMS	1,233,500 (52%)
incl. Bulgarians	1,130,000 (48%)
incl. Roma	12,000 (1%)
incl. Greeks	12,000 (1%)
incl. Jews	12,000 (1%)
incl. Armenians	2,500 (0%)
incl. Vlachs and others	65,000 (3%)
TOTAL Danube Vilayet	2,353,000 (100%)

The total population of the two mainly Turkish sanjaks of the Danube Vilayet in 1876, according to the French consul Aubaret:

Community	Varna Sanjak	Rusçuk Sanjak
Turks	92,800 (68%)	388,000 (57%)
Bulgarians	32,200 (24%)	229,500 (34%)
Circassians		33,000 (5%)
Roma	2,900 (2%)	23,500 (3%)
Greeks	6,842 (5%)	
Jews		2,200 (0%)
Armenians		2,000 (0%)
Vlachs		1,000 (0%)
TOTAL	136,000 (100%)	680,000 (100%)

=== Adrianople Vilayet ===
Total population of the Adrianople Vilayet in 1878 according to the Turkish author Kemal Karpat:

Group	POPULATION			
Bulgarians	40% (526,691)			
Other Christians	22% (283,603)			
Muslims	39% (503,058)	-	TOTAL Adrianople Vilayet	100% (1,304,352)

Male population of the Filibe Sancak of the Adrianople Vilayet in 1876 according to the British R. J. Moore:

	Turks	Muslim Roma	Christian Roma	Bulgarians	Greeks	Armenians	Jews	KAZA TOTAL
Filibe kaza	28% (35,400)	4% (5,474)	0% (495)	63% (80,107)	3% (3,700)	0% (380)	1% (691)	100% (126,247)
Tatar Pazardzhik kaza	23% (10,805)	4% (2,120)	1% (579)	70% (33,395)	1% (300)	0% (94)	1% (344)	100% (47,637)
Hasköy kaza	55% (33,323)	3% (1,548)	0% (145)	42% (25,503)	0% (0)	0% (3)	0% (65)	100% (60,587)
Zagora kaza	20% (6,677)	3% (989)	0% (70)	75% (24,857)	0% (0)	0% (0)	2% (740)	100% (33,333)
Kazanlak kaza	46% (14,365)	4% (1,384)	0% (24)	48% (14,906)	0% (0)	0% (0)	1% (219)	100% (30,898)
Chirpan kaza	24% (5,157)	2% (420)	0% (88)	74% (15,959)	0% (0)	0% (0)	0% (0)	100% (21,624)
Sultan-Jeri kaza	97% (13,336)	1% (159)	0% (0)	2% (262)	0% (0)	0% (0)	0% (0)	100% (13,757)
Akcselebi kaza	59% (8,197)	3% (377)	0% (0)	38% (5,346)	0% (0)	0% (0)	0% (0)	100% (13,920)
TOTAL Filibe Sanjak	37% (127,260)	4% (12,471)	0% (1,401)	58% (200,335)	1% (4,000)	0% (477)	1% (2,059)	100% (348,000)

Male population of İslimiye sanjak of Adrianople Vilayet in 1873 according to Ottoman almanacs:

Community	Population
Muslims	37,200 (47%)
Non-Muslims	46,961 (53%)
TOTAL Islimiye sanjak	100% (84,161)

Male population of İslimiye sanjak of Adrianople Vilayet in 1875 according to British R.J. Moore:

Community	Population
Muslims	42% (44,747)
Non-Muslims	58% (60,854)
TOTAL Islimiye sanjak	100% (105,601)

Total population of the Sanjak of Gümülcine of the Adrianople Vilayet In the 19th century:

Sanjak	Muslims	Christian Bulgarians	Christian Greeks
Gümülcine	206.914	20.671	15.241

=== Eastern Rumelia ===
Total population of the later Eastern Rumelia before and after the Russo-Turkish War of 1877-78 (Drummons-Wolff to Salisbury, 26.09.1878) after forced migration:

Population	1875	1878	1879
Muslim Turks	29% (220,000)	16% (90,000)	+100.000
Muslim Pomaks	3% (25,000)	4% (25,000)	
Muslim Tatars	1% (10,000)	1% (8,000)	
Muslim Circassians	1% (10,000)	0% (0)	
Muslim Gyspies	3% (25,000)	3% (16,000)	
Jews	1% (9,000)	1% (8,000)	
Bulgarian Catholics	1% (9,000)	2% (9,000)	
Bulgarian Exarchists	53% (400,000)	66% (380,000)	
Grecophile Bulgarians	5% (35,000)	5% (30,000)	
Greeks	5% (35,000)	5% (30,000)	
Greek Vlachs	0% (2,000)	0% (2,000)	
Greek Albanians	0% (2,000)	0% (2,000)	
Armenians	0% (2,000)	0% (2,000)	
TOTAL	100% (760,000)	100% (580,000)	

=== Constantinople Vilayet ===
Population of Istanbul in 1885 according to Stanford Shaw (Male:female):

Group	Born in	Born outside
Muslim	143.586(M:F 1:2)	241.324(M:F 2:1)
Greeks	68.764	83.977
Armenian Orthodox	78.679	70.991
Bulgarian	46	4331
Catholic	3722	2720
Jewish	42.363	1998
Protestant	225	594
Latin	609	473

=== Salonika Vilayet ===
Male population of some sanjaks in 1880 according to Earl Granville:

Sanjak	Muslims	Greeks	Patriarchist Bulgarians	Exarchist Bulgarians	Vlachs	Jews
Siroz	54.436	31.820	28.053	15.335	2859	988
Salonika	25.669	61.434	13.099-15.000	15.975	4462	25.473

Male population of some sanjaks in 1878 according to Bulgarian Kusev and Gruev:

Sanjak	Muslims	Bulgarians	Greeks	Vlachs	Roma	Pomaks
Siroz	19.344	70.895	117.226	1812	1170	13873
Salonika	9.441	96.000	113.279		1751	2862–8697

Total population of some sanjaks in 1881 according to Italian Hondros:

Sanjak	Turks	Greeks	Bulgarians	Jews	Vlachs
Siroz	91.700	66.500	54.580	1520	4150

Total population of some sanjaks according to vice-consul Stanislas Recchioli in 1878:

Sanjak	Muslims	incl. Turks	Christians
Drama	270.998	249.165	413.549

=== Total ===
Total population according to Abdolonyme Ubicini who based the statistics on the Ottoman census of 1844:

Community	in Europe	in Asia	in Africa
Turks	2,100,000 (14%)	10,700,000 (67%)	
Greeks	1,000,000 (6%)	1,000,000 (6%)	
Armenians	400,000 (3%)	2,000,000 (12%)	
Jews	70,000 (0%)	80,000 (0%)	
Slavs	6,200,000 (40%)		
Romanians	4,000,000 (26%)		
Albanians	1,500,000 (10%)		
Tatars	16,000 (0%)	20,000 (0%)	
Arabs		900,000 (6%)	3,800,000 (100%)
Assyrians		235,000 (1%)	
Druzes		30,000 (0%)	
Kurds		1,000,000 (6%)	
Turcomans		85,000 (1%)	
Roma	214,000 (1%)		
Muslims	4,550,000 (29%)	12,650,000 (79%)	3,800,000 (100%)
Christians	10,640,000 (69%)	3,260,000 (20%)	
Jews	70,000 (0%)	80,000 (0%)	
Total	15,500,000 (100%)	16,050,000 (100%)	3,800,000 (100%)

Total population according to The New Armenia's 1912 estimation before the Balkan Wars:

Ethnoreligious estimates of the total population
Group	Estimate
Turkic peoples	4,000,000 (13%)
Christian Turks	300,000 (1%)
Kurds	2,000,000 (6%)
Lazes	200,000 (1%)
Circassians	1,000,000 (3%)
Chechens	200,000 (1%)
Abaza	100,000 (0%)
Karapapakhs	200,000 (1%)
Georgians	100,000 (0%)
Muslim Albanians	2,500,000 (8%)
Christian Albanians	500,000 (2%)
Arabs	13,000,000 (41%)
Roma	200,000 (1%)
Greeks	3,000,000 (9%)
Armenians	2,000,000 (6%)
Bulgarians	1,000,000 (3%)
Vlachs/Romanians	200,000 (1%)
Serbs	200,000 (1%)
other European	100,000 (0%)
Jews	400,000 (1%)
Qizilbash	1,000,000 (3%)
Fellah, Tahtadji, etc.	100,000 (0%)
Yazidis	100,000 (0%)
Total	32,000,000 (100%)

Arab estimates
Group	Estimate
Hidjazi Arabs and Yemenis	5,000,000 (16%)
Mesopotamian Arabs	3,000,000 (9%)
Tripolitanian Arabs	1,500,000 (5%)
Druze	100,000 (0%)
Syrian	2,000,000 (6%)
Christian Syrians	1,000,000 (3%)
Total Arab population	13,000,000 (100%)

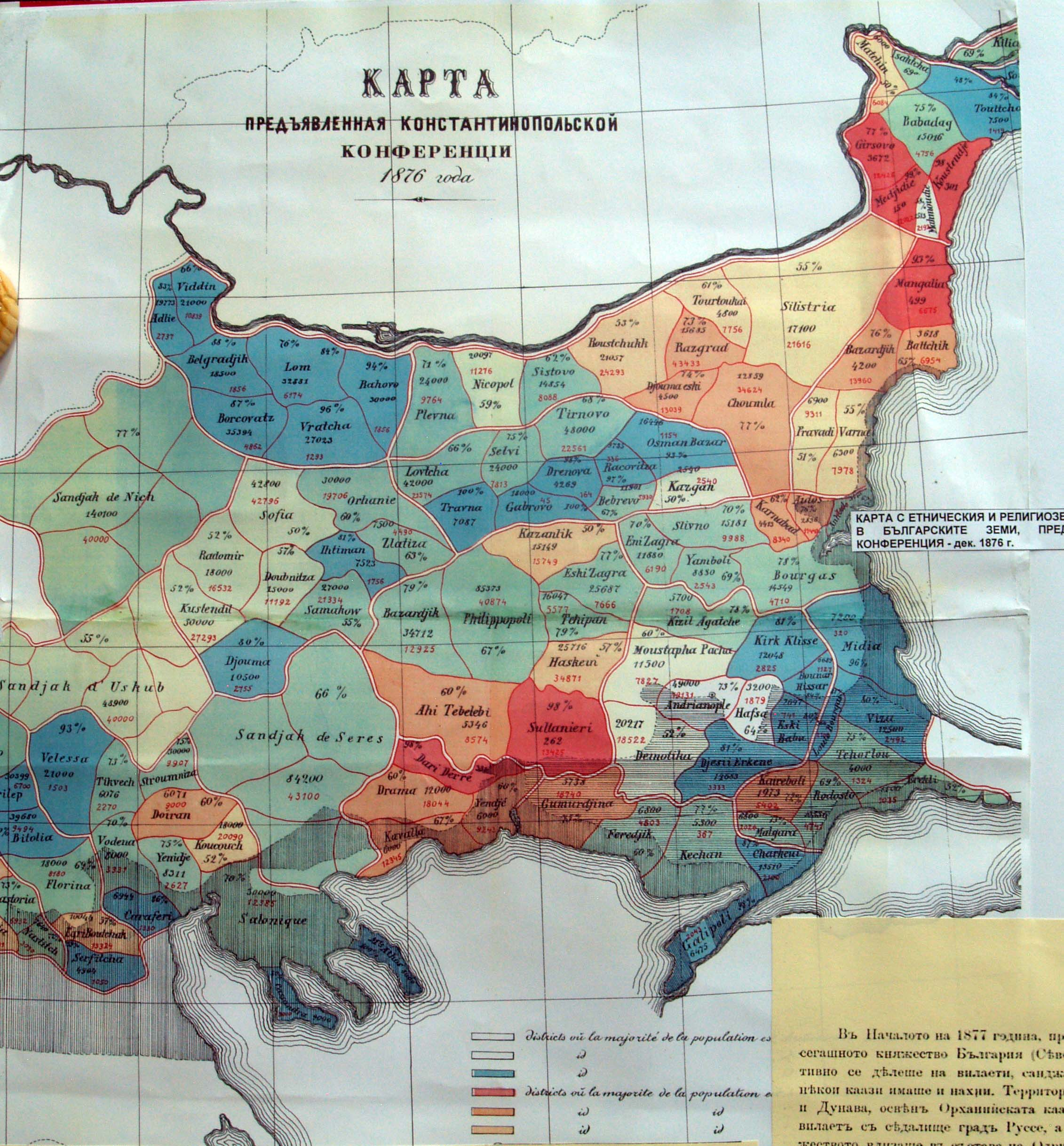
An 1876 map of the Russian diplomat Teplov on the Muslim and Christian population in some kazas concerning the Constantinople Conference.

==== European part ====
Estimates in some eighteen sources show that the Muslims constituted about 35% of the total Balkan population during the first half of the 19th century, while in the second half of the century the proportion grew to 43%. According to thirty-three sources, the proportion of Turks in the European provinces during the 19th century ranges from 11 to 24 percent; of Greeks from 9 to 16 percent; of Bulgarians from 24 to 39 percent. The Turks made up two thirds of the Muslims in the Danube Vilayet and most of them in the Adrianople Vilayet and Salonika Vilayet. In the more western vilayets, the Muslims were a majority, which consisted usually of Slavs and Albanians. In the Ioannina Vilayet, the Orthodox Christians were dominant, a majority of whom were ethnically Albanian according to Ottoman officials and were also three fourths of the Muslims. In 1867, Salaheddin Bey estimated 595,000 Circassian newcomers and 400,000 Armenians in the European part. Practically all of the Circassians began migrating to Anatolia after the Russian military advances in the last quarter of the century.

Total population of the European part in 1831 according to David Urquhart:

Community	Population
Muslim Turks	700,000 (7%)
Muslim Albanians	1,066,000 (10%)
Muslim Bosniaks, Tuleman, Pomaks	2,000,000 (19%)
Christian Greeks (excl. Greece)	1,180,000 (11%)
Christian Slavs	4,000,000 (37%)
Christian Albanians	530,000 (5%)
Christian Vlachs	600,000 (6%)
Jews, Armenians, etc.	600,000 (6%)
TOTAL	10,676,000 (100%)

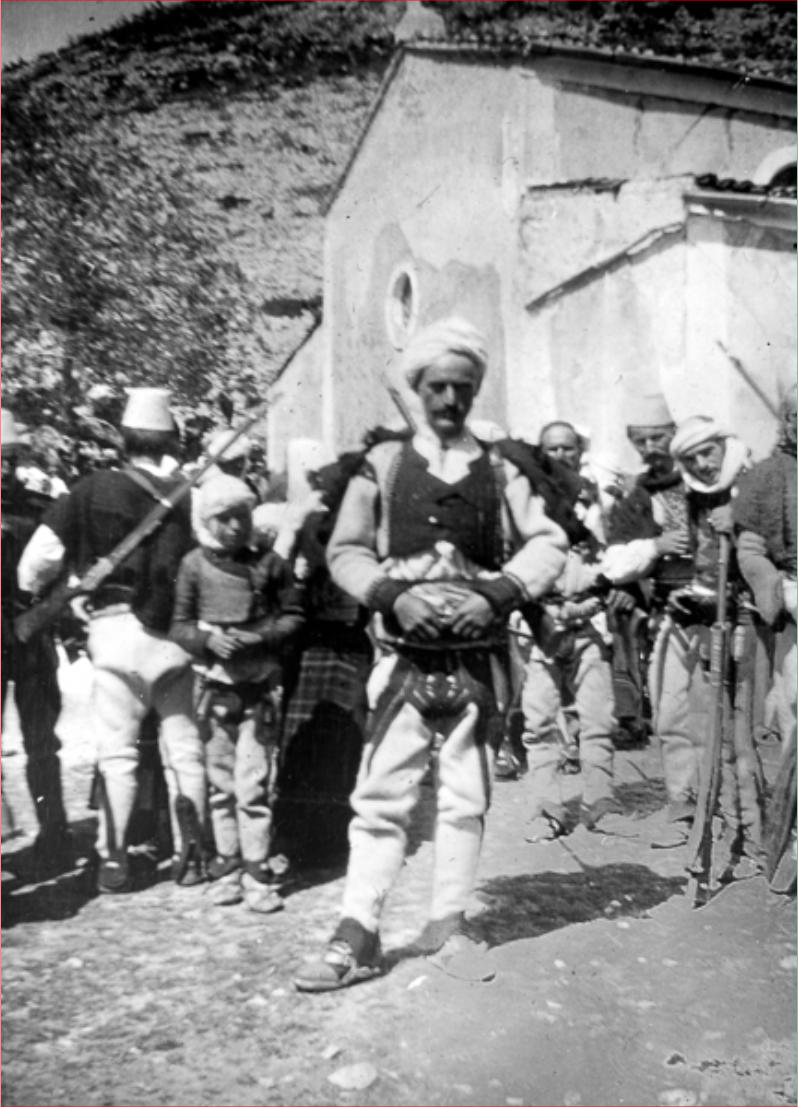
Men of the Albanian tribe at the feast of Saint Nicholas at Bzheta in Shkreli territory, 1908

Total population of the European part in the 1840s according to Auguste Viquesnel:

Ethnic group	Total	Muslims	Christians	Jews
Moldo-Wallachians	4,112,105 (27%)		3,976,825	135,280
Bulgarians	3,000,000 (20%)	60,000	2,940,000	
Ottomans, Yörüks, Tatars	2,100,000 (14%)	2,100,000		
Albanians	1,400,000 (9%)	1,250,000	150,000	
Bosnians and Herzegovians	1,300,000 (9%)	600,000	700,000	
Serbs	1,004,000 (7%)	15,000	987,600	1,400
Greeks	975,000 (6%)	15,000	960,000	
Armenians	400,000 (3%)		400,000	
Roma	214,000 (1%)	140,000		
Croats	200,000 (1%)		200,000	
Montenegrins	100,000 (1%)		100,000	
Jews	70,000 (0%)			70,000
Cossacks	9,000 (0%)		9,000	
TOTAL	15,184,105 (100%)	4,180,000	10,723,425	206,680

Total population of European part in 1872 according to the military attaché in Constantinople Ritter zur Helle von Samo based on Ottoman province yearbooks:

Vilayet	Muslims	Non-Muslims
Istanbul (Europe)	285,100 (42%)	400,100 (58%)
Adrianople	503,058 (39%)	801,294 (61%)
Scutari	100,000 (44%)	128,000 (56%)
Prizren	728,286 (61%)	470,868 (39%)
Danube	817,200 (41%)	1,199,230 (59%)
Janina	249,699 (35%)	460,802 (65%)
Salonica	429,410 (35%)	807,928 (65%)
Bosnia	630,456 (51%)	612,000 (49%)
Crete	90,000 (43%)	120,000 (57%)
Istanbul (Asia)	455,500 (57%)	340,500 (43%)
Serbia	4,965 (0%)	1,314,424 (100%)
United Principalities	3,000 (0%)	4,497,000 (100%)
Montenegro	0 (0%)	100,000 (100%)

Total population of the European part in 1876 according to Ernst Georg Ravenstein who relied on several sources including Ottoman statistics:

Community	Population
Muslim Turks and Tatars	1,388,000 (17%)
Muslim Bulgarians	790,000 (10%)
Muslim Albanians	723,000 (9%)
Muslim Serbs	442,000 (5%)
Muslim Circassians	144,000 (2%)
Muslim Roma	52,000 (1%)
Muslim Greeks	38,000 (0%)
Muslim Arabs	3,000 (0%)
Muslim foreigners	5,000 (0%)
Non-Muslim Bulgarians	2,071,000 (25%)
Non-Muslim Greeks	1,082,000 (13%)
Non-Muslim Serbs	672,000 (8%)
Non-Muslim Albanians	308,000 (4%)
Non-Muslim Romanians	200,000 (2%)
Non-Muslim Armenians	100,000 (1%)
Jews	72,000 (1%)
Non-Muslim foreigenrs	60,000 (1%)
Non-Muslim Roma	52,000 (1%)
Non-Muslim Russians	10,000 (0%)
TOTAL	8,207,000 (100%)

Total population of some sanjaks in 1877 according to Russian diplomat Teplov:

Sanjak	Bulgarians	Non-Bulgarians	Muslims	Non-Muslims
Vidin	263.000	131.600	39.723	333.317
Tırnova	188.500	112.000	68.199	328.390
Niş	283.000	148.100	72.188	36.0559
Sofia	297.500	189.000	57.789	428.949
Rusçuk	201.025	354.324	268824	290626
Varna	36.000	74.100	64.621	45.875
Tulça	40.570	188.930	103.328	116.203
Total (Danube)	1.310.695	1.198.054	674.672	1.903.919
Islimiye	100.500	186.400	64.459	213.066
Philippopolis	382.500	564.600	318.052	628.770
Total	1.793.695	1.949.054	1.057.183	2.745.755

Population of the sanjaks according to a Greek author:

Sanjak	Greeks	Bulgarians	Muslims	Others
Tekirdağ	117.600		19.000	32.000
Gelibolu	98.900		35.000	10.000
Adrianople	171.000	78.320	125.000	35.000
Islimiye	37.100	54.200	54.300	30.000
Filibe	32.000	180.000	120.000	38.000
Drama	42.000	1000	35.000	30.000
Salonika	210.500	59.500	140.000	70.000
Siroz	175.000	20.000	84.000	15.000
Bitola	278.000	60.000	90.000	20.000

Male population of the parts of the Danube, Adrianople and Salonika vilayets corresponding to the modern Republic of Bulgaria in 1875 according to Totev:

Place	Muslims	Non-Muslims
Total	687.998	1.053.387
Danube Vilayet	451.680	712.842

== Special reports ==
=== Arnold J. Toynbee ===
During World War I; The treatment of Armenians in the Ottoman Empire was a book by Viscount Bryce and Arnold J. Toynbee which compiled statements from eyewitnesses from other countries including Germany, Italy, the Netherlands, Sweden, and Switzerland, who similarly attested to Armenians in the Ottoman Empire during 1915–1916. The publication presents Arnold J. Toynbee's analysis on Armenian population in the Ottoman Empire. A summary table of his analysis included in the page 199. In the "vilayet of Van", there were two portions, portions in modern use corresponds to county. As explained by Arnold J. Toynbee in the footprint at page 199, he developed his analysis by excluding certain portions of the province where he said "Armenians were a minor". Arnold Toynbee in finding the ratio of Armenians in vilayet of Van; he removed the values originating from portions of Van (listed in the foot print) where Armenians were in minority. The presented table in page 1999 shows the re-calculated values by Arnold J. Toynbee of these selected provinces using values of the parts (counties, sanjaks) which Armenians were not in minority. The presented map shows the re-calculated values of the stated provinces using values where Armenians are not in minority.

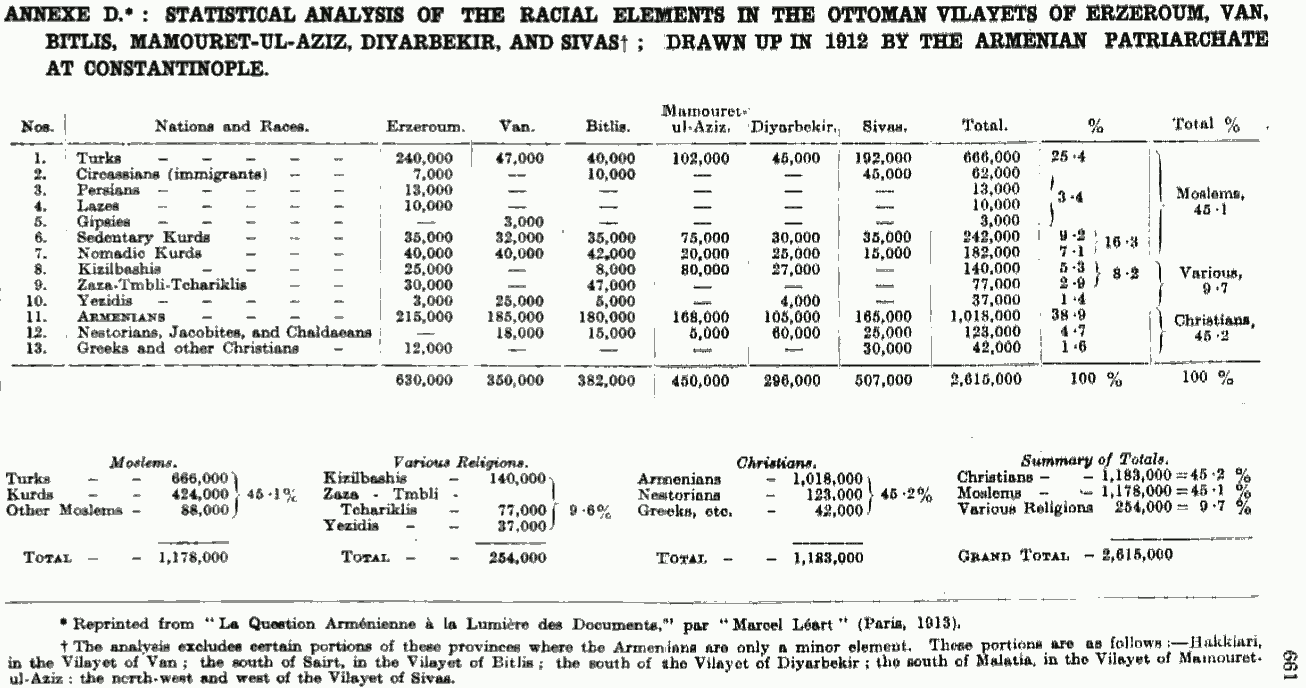
Ethnic values of the Six vilayets according to presented data.

== See also ==
- Subdivisions of the Ottoman Empire

Articles discussing the demographics of the Ottoman Empire:

- Demographics of Turkey
- Ottoman Armenian population
- History of the Jews in the Ottoman Empire
- Demographics of Kosovo

== Bibliography ==
- Shaw, Stanford Jay; Shaw, Ezel Kural (1977). History of the Ottoman Empire and Modern Turkey. Cambridge University Press.
- * Shaw, Standford J. (August 1978). "The Ottoman Census System and Population, 1831–1914". International Journal of Middle East Studies. 9 (3): 325–338. doi:10.1017/S0020743800033602.
- Karpat, Kemal H. (May 1978). "Ottoman Population Records and the Census of 1881/82–1893". International Journal of Middle East Studies. 9 (2): 237–274. doi:10.1017/S0020743800000088.
- L. Kinross, The Ottoman Centuries: The Rise and Fall of the Turkish Empire, 1979
- M. Kabadayı, Inventory for the Ottoman Empire / Turkish Republic 1500–2000
- Mutlu, Servet (2003). "Late Ottoman Population And Its Ethnic Distribution" (PDF). Turkish Journal of Population Studies. 25: 3–38.
