= Danube vilayet =

First-level administrative division of the Ottoman Empire

Vilayet of the Danube ولايت طونه Vilâyet-i Tûna Bulgarian: Дунавска област
- Vilayet of the Ottoman Empire
- 1864–1878
- Flag

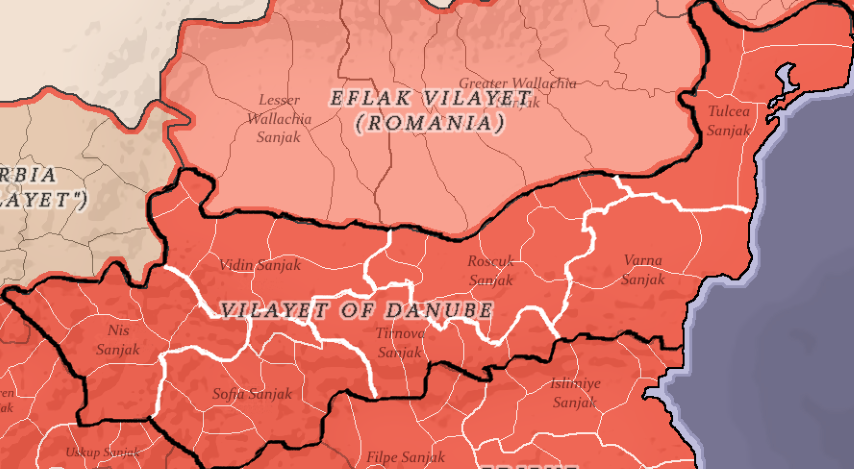
- The Danube Vilayet with sandjak borders
- Capital: Rusçuk
- Area
  - Coordinates: 43°0′N 25°0′E
- Population
  - 1864: 1,995,000
- Government
- Governor
  - 1864-1868: Ahmed Şefik Midhat Pasha
  - 1876-1877: Oman Mazhar Ahmed
- History
  - Vilayet Law: 1864
  - Congress of Berlin: 1878
Preceded by
Nis Eyalet
Vidin Eyalet
Ozu Eyalet
Succeeded by
Principality of Bulgaria
Principality of Serbia
Kingdom of Romania
Eastern Rumelia
- Today part of: Romania; Serbia; Bulgaria

The Vilayet of the Danube or Danubian Vilayet (Ottoman Turkish: ولايت طونه, romanized: Vilâyet-i Tuna; Bulgarian: Дунавска област, Dunavska(ta) oblast, more commonly Дунавски вилает, Danube Vilayet) was a first-level administrative division (vilayet) of the Ottoman Empire from 1864 to 1878. In the late 19th century it reportedly had an area of 34,120 square miles (88,400 km^{2}).

The vilayet was created by merging the Eyalets of Niš, Vidin and Silistra (in its post-1826 borders, after losing all kazas south of the Balkan mountains that were spun off into the Edirne Vilayet). The Danube Vilayet was meant to become a model province, showcasing all the progress achieved by the Porte through the modernising Tanzimat reforms. Other vilayets modelled on the vilayet of the Danube were ultimately established throughout the empire by 1876, with the exception of the Arabian Peninsula and the by then semi-independent Egypt. Rusçuk, today Ruse in Bulgaria, was chosen as the capital of the vilayet due to its position as a key Ottoman port on the Danube.

The province disappeared after the Russo-Turkish War of 1877–78, when its north-eastern part (Northern Dobruja) was incorporated into Romania, some of its western territories into Serbia, while the central and southern regions made up most of the autonomous Principality of Bulgaria and a part of Eastern Rumelia.

== Borders and administrative divisions ==
Upon its establishment in 1864, the Danube Vilayet included the following sanjaks:

1. Sanjak of Tulcea
2. Sanjak of Varna
3. Sanjak of Ruse
4. Sanjak of Tărnovo
5. Sanjak of Vidin
6. Sanjak of Sofia
7. Sanjak of Niš

In 1868, the Sanjak of Niš was detached and made part of the Prizren Vilayet.

In 1876, the Sanjak of Niš and the Sanjak of Sofia were spun off into the short-lived Sofia Vilayet but were subsequently annexed to the Vilayets of Adrianople and Kosovo Vilayets only a year later, in 1877.

== Government ==
Ottoman Turkish version of the "Constitutive law of the department formed under the name of vilayet of the Danube" (Bulgarian: Органически устав на департамента, създаден под наименование Дунавски вилает) as published in the Takvim-i Vekayi

Midhat Pasha was the first governor of the vilayet (1864–1868). During his time as a governor, steamship lines were established on the Danube River; the Ruse-Varna railroad was completed; agricultural credit cooperatives providing farmers with low-interest loans were introduced; tax incentives were also offered to encourage new industrial enterprises.

The first official vilayet newspaper in the Ottoman Empire, Tuna/Dunav, was published in both Ottoman Turkish and Bulgarian and had both Ottoman and Bulgarian editors. Its editors in chief included Ismail Kemal and Ahmed Midhat Efendi.

The vilayet had an Administrative Assembly that included state officials appointed by the Ottoman government as well as six representatives (three Muslims and three non-Muslims) elected from among the inhabitants of the province. Non-Muslims also participated in the provincial criminal and commercial courts that were based on a secular code of law and justice. Mixed Muslim-Christian schools were also introduced, but this reform was abolished after it was met by strong opposition by the populace.

== Governors ==
Loi constitutive du département formé sous le nom de vilayet du Danube ("Constitutive law of the department formed under the name of vilayet of the Danube") in French

Governors of the Vilayet:

- Hafiz Ahmed Midhat Shefik Pasha (October 1864 – March 1868)
- Mehmed Sabri Pasha (March 1868 – December 1868)
- Arnavud Mehmed Akif Pasha (February 1869 – October 1870)
- Kücük ömer Fevzi Pasha (October 1870 – October 1871)
- Ahmed Rasim Pasha (October 1871 – June 1872)
- Ahmed Hamdi Pasha (June 1872 – April 1873)
- Abdurrahman Nureddin Pasha (April 1873 – April 1874)
- Mehmed Asim Pasha (April 1874 – September 1876)
- Halil Rifat Pasha (October 1876 – February 1877)
- Oman Mazhar Ahmed (1876–1877)

== Demographics ==
Millets in the future Danube Vilayet as per the 1831 Ottoman Census
1. Rayah (64.2%)
2. Islam millet (33.3%)
3. Gypsies (2.43%)
4. Jews (0.09%)

According to the 1831 Ottoman census, the male population of the kazas to subsequently form the Danube Vilayet stood at 477,862 souls, including 306,534 Orthodox Christians or Rayah (64.15%), 159,308 Muslims (33.33%), 11,603 Romani (2.43%) and 417 Jews (0.09%). The census only covered healthy taxable men between 15 and 60 years of age, who were free from disability.

1831 Ottoman census (healthy taxable men over 15 only):
Millet	Danube Vilayet borders	
Millet	Healthy taxable men aged 15–60 years^{2}	%
Islam millet/Muslims	159,308	33.33%
Rayah/Orthodox Christians^{1}	306,534	64.15%
Gypsies/Romani	11,603	2.43%
Jews	417	0.09%
TOTAL	477,862	100.0%
^{1}No data about the Christian population of the kazas of Selvi (Sevlievo), Izladi (Zlatitsa), Etripolu (Etropole), Lofça (Lovech), Plevne (Pleven), Rahova (Oryahovo) as well as Tirnova (Veliko Tarnovo) and its three constituent nahiyas. Similarly, the sheets regarding the (primarily Muslim-inhabited) kazas of Silistre (Silistra), Şumnu (Shumen), Hezargrad (Razgrad), Cuma-i Atik Targovishte and Tutrakan were lost altogether.

Reliable data about the population of the Niš, Vidin and Silistra Eyalets, which were to form the Danube Vilayet in 1864, appeared only in the late 1850s, in the form of an Ottoman summary population register and a 1858 report by the British consul in Varna, Edward S. J. Neale (also based on the registers). According to Neale, the combined, male and female population of the three eyalets was 1,390,855, including 430,485 Muslims (30.95%), 910,735 Orthodox Bulgarians (65.48%), 10,100 Greeks (0.73%), 25,000 Vlachs (1.80%), 5,000 Jews (0.36%), and 9,535 "others" (0.68%). He noted that the Muslim population was in a steady demographic decline, while the Bulgarian one had increased considerably due to the Tanzimat reforms.

1858 Population of the Niš, Vidin and Silistra Eyalets per Edward S. J. Neale
1. Orthodox Bulgarians (65.5%)
2. Muslims (30.9%)
3. Vlachs (1.80%)
4. Greeks (0.73%)
5. Jews (0.36%)
6. Others (0.68%)

Nevertheless, compared with subsequent Ottoman statistics, Neale's figures appear to be an undercount, especially of Muslims, even though his opinion of population trends is shared by a number of Turkish historians, e.g., Kemal Karpat, who has cited an annual growth rate of 0% for Muslims and 2% for Non-Muslims for much of the 1800s.

According to the first modern Ottoman population register of 1859–1860, the Niš Eyalet, Vidin Eyalet and Silistra Eyalet had a male population of 821,682, whereof 284,934 Muslims (34.68%), including 19,599 Muslim Romani (2.39%), and 536,748 Non-Muslims (65.32%), including 3,258 Non-Muslim Romani (0.4%). Total population, including women, was therefore 1,643,364, of whom 569,969 Muslims and 1,073,496 Non-Muslims. The register, however, did not cover the population of the Sanjaks of Mecidiye (Medgidia) and Sünne (Sulina) in Northern Dobruja, nor any Muhacir population. Compared with the—albeit incomplete and poorly executed 1831 census—the figures indicate a whooping population growth of 71.95%, which is difficult to explain by natural growth alone.

At the same time, the proportions of the Muslim, Non-Muslim and Roma populations remained, by and large, similar. The number of Muslims grew by 66.55%, the number of Non-Muslims by 71.95%, while the Christian and Muslim Romani population practically doubled, posting an increase of 97.03%. However, despite steady growth rates, especially among Non-Muslims, the more likely reason for the drastic increase can be sought in the poor quality of the 1831 census, including missing data about a number of heavily populated kazas. In addition, as the census covered healthy taxable men over 15 only, it is unclear how much of the male population was actually counted, with, e.g., Arkadiev suggesting a multiplication factor of 2.02 to just calculate all males.

Muslim & Non-Muslim population in the territory of the future Danube Vilayet as per the Ottoman population register for 1859–1860:

Male Population of the Danube Vilayet in 1859–60
Sanjak^{1}	Muslims		Non-Muslims		Total
Sanjak^{1}	Number	%	Number	%	Total
Vidin	11,906	14.10%	72,543	85.90%	84,449
Lofça	31,885	33.57%	63.091	66.43%	94,976
Niş	23,412	18.00%	106,683	82.00%	130,095
Köstendil	19,463	32.67%	40,104	71.33%	59,567
Samakov	7,634	13,86%	47,422	86.14%	55,056
Sofya	8,104	12.16%	58,563	87.14%	66,667
Silistre	43,257	67.20%	21,104	32.80%	64,361
Tulça	6,150	35.08%	11,383	64.92%	17,533
Hezargrad	29,817	76.57%	9,124	33.43%	38,941
Şumnu	49,805	76.03%	15,706	23.97%	65,511
Varna	21,436	65.60%	11,241	34.40%	32,677
Tırnova	32,065	28.67%	79,784	71.33%	111,849
Grand Total	284,934	34.68%	536,748	65.32%	821,682
^{1} Sanjak structure, borders, etc. underwent a complete overhaul in 1863-1864, so population figures are not comparable with later data.

Non-Muslims held a clear majority in both the Niš Eyalet and Vidin Eyalet, at 81.18% and 75.59%, respectively, while the Silistra Eyalet was predominantly Muslim but by a slim margin of 55.17%,

The 1859-1860 figures are important as a benchmark as they are the last Ottoman records to not take into account the massive settlement of Crimean Tatars and Circassians across the Ottoman Empire after their forced expulsion by the Russians. Estimates of the number of Muhacir settled in the Danube Vilayet from 1855 to 1865 vary, from 200,000 to 300,000 according to Kemal Karpat, 300,000 as stated by Turkish historian Nedim İpek, 300,000 quoted by the 1867 Bulgarian edition of the Danube Official Gazette, 310,000 according to the French Consul-General in Rusçuk, Gabriel Aubaret, 350,000 according to Ottoman statesman and Danube Vilayet Governor, Midhat Pasha, and all the way to 350,000–400,000, as estimated by Bulgarian Ottomanist Ventsislav Muchinov (however, for the entire Rumelia). The resettlement took place in two waves: one of 142,852 Tatars and Nogais, with a minority of Circassians, between 1855 and 1862, and a second one of some 35,000 Circassian families, settled in 1863–1864. Thus, nearly half of all 682,000 refugees were ended up in the Danube Vilayet.

Eventually, the Muhacir settlement led to an increase in the share of Muslims in the province to more than 42% by the mid-1870s. According to Kemal Karpat, the Tatar and Circassian colonisation of the vilayet not only offset the heavy Muslim population losses earlier in the century, but also counteracted continued population loss and led to an increase in its Muslim population. Koyuncu also attributes the lion's share of the Muslim population growth to the settlement of Crimean Tatars and Circassians.

Male population of the Danube Vilayet (exclusive of the Sanjak of Niš) in 1865 according to Kuyûd-ı Atîk (the Danube Vilayet printing press):

Ethnoconfessional Groups in the Danube Vilayet as per 1865 Population Register
1. Bulgarians (56.2%)
2. Muslims (40.3%)
3. Vlachs (0.92%)
4. Armenians (0.86%)
5. Greeks (0.60%)
6. Jews (0.44%)
7. Christian Romani (0.44%)
8. Muslim Romani (0.20%)

Ethnoconfessional Groups in the Danube Vilayet as per the 1865 Population Register
Community	Rusçuk Sanjak	Vidin Sanjak	Varna Sanjak	Tırnova Sanjak	Tulça Sanjak	Sofya Sanjak	Danube Vilayet
Islam Millet	138,017 (61%)	14,835 (13%)	38,230 (74%)	77,539 (40%)	38,479 (65%)	20,612 (12%)	327,712 (40%)
Muslim Roma	312 (0%)	245 (0%)	118 (0%)	128 (0%)	19 (0%)	766 (0%)	1,588 (0%)
Bulgar Millet	85,268 (38%)	93,613 (80%)	9,553 (18%)	113,213 (59%)	12,961 (22%)	142,410 (86%)	457,018 (56%)
Ullah Millet	0 (0%)	7,446 (6%)	0 (0%)	0 (0%)	0 (0%)	0 (0%)	7,446 (1%)
Ermeni Millet	926 (0%)	0 (0%)	368 (1%)	0 (0%)	5,720 (10%)	0 (0%)	7,014 (1%)
Rum Millet	0 (0%)	0 (0%)	2,639 (5%)	0 (0%)	2,215 (4%)	0 (0%)	4,908 (1%)
Non-Muslim Romani people	145 (0%)	130 (0%)	999 (2%)	1,455 (1%)	92 (0%)	786 (0%)	3,607 (0%)
Yahudi Millet	1,101 (0%)	630 (1%)	14 (0%)	0 (0%)	1 (0%)	1,790 (1%)	3,536 (0%)
TOTAL	225,769 (100%)	116,899 (100%)	51,975 (100%)	192,335 (100%)	59,487 (100%)	166,364 (100%)	812,829 (100%)

Male Muslim & Non-Muslim population in the Danube Vilayet according to the Ottoman Salname (Yearbook) for 1868:

Male Muslim & Non-Muslim Population in the Danube Vilayet as per the 1868 Ottoman Salname
Sanjak	Muslims		Non-Muslims		Total
Sanjak	Number	%	Number	%	Total
Rusçuk	138,692	59.14%	95,834	40.86%	234,526
Varna	58,689	73.86%	20,769	26.14%	79.458
Vidin	25,338	16.90%	124,567	83.10%	149,905
Sofya	24,410	14.23%	147,095	85.77%	171,505
Tirnova	71,645	40.73%	104,273	59.27%	175,918
Tulça	39,133	68.58%	17,929	41.42%	57,062
Niş	54,510	35.18%	100,425	64.82%	154,935
Grand Total	412,417	40.30%	610,892	59.70%	1,023,309

After a vilayet-wide census completed in September 1874, the Danube Official Gazette published a flash summary of results on 18 October 1874, presenting cumulative data only, with no sanjak-by-sanjak breakdown. The results were also used for the 1875 Ottoman Salname, where they were also presented by sanjak, albeit with omissions.

Flash summary of the 1873-1874 Danube Vilayet census (males only), as published by the Danube Official Gazette:.

1873-1874 Census of the Danube Vilayet^{1} (Males Only)
Community	Population
Muslims	481,798 (42%)
—Established Muslims	392,369 (34%)
—Muslim settlers	64,398 (6%)
—Muslim Roma	25,031 (2%)
Christians	646,215 (57%)
—Bulgarians	592,573 (52%)
—Greeks	7,655 (1%)
—Armenians	2,128 (0%)
—Catholics	3,556 (0%)
—other Christians	40,303 (4%)
—Non-Muslims Romani people	7,663 (1%)
Jews	5,375 (0%)
TOTAL Danube Vilayet	1,141,051 (100%)
^{1} Exclusive of the Sanjak of Niš.

Ethnoconfessional Groups in the Danube Vilayet as per 1873-74 Vilayet Census
1. Bulgarians (52.0%)
2. Establ. Muslims (34.4%)
3. Circassian Muhacir (5.65%)
4. Misc. Christians (3.53%)
5. Muslim Romani (2.19%)
6. Christian Romani (0.68%)
7. Greeks (0.67%)
8. Jews (0.48%)
9. Roman Catholics (0.31%)

Total population of the Danube Vilayet by ethnoconfessional group according to French orientalist Ubicini on the basis of the official Ottoman Census of the Danube Vilayet of 1873-1874 (exclusive of the Sanjak of Niš, then part of the Prizren Vilayet):

Ethnoconfessional Groups in the Danube Vilayet^{1} as per the 1873-74 Census
Community	Number	Percentage
Muslims	963,596	42.28%
—Established Muslims	784,731	34.44%
—Circassian Muhacir	128,796	5.65%
—Muslim Romani	50.069	2.19%
Christians	1,303,944	57.23%
—Bulgar millet	1,185,146	52.02%
—Rum millet	15,310	0.67%
—Ermeni millet	450	0.02%
—Roman Catholics	7,112	0.31%
—Christian Romani	15,524	0.68%
—Miscellaneous Christians^{2}	80,402	3.53%
Yahudi millet	10,752	0.48%
GRAND TOTAL	2,278,290	100%
^{1} Exclusive of the Sanjak of Niš.^{2} Vlachs, Lipovans, Cossacks, Germans, etc., mostly in Sanjak of Tulça.

Thus, according to the 1874 census, there were 963,596 (42.22%) Muslims and 1,318,506 (57.78%) Non-Muslims in the Danube Vilayet, exclusive of the Sanjak of Niš. Adding Niš resulted in a population breakdown of 1,055,650 (40.68%) Muslims and 1,539,278 (59.32%) Non-Muslims for the province. Muslims formed a majority in the Sanjaks of Rusçuk, Varna and Tulça, while the Sanjaks of Sofia, Vidin, Niš and Tarnovo had Non-Muslim majorities.

However, nearly a third of all Muslims and close to 15% of the total population of the province were all but recent settlers, and the spectacular increase in the Muslim population of, in particular, the Varna and Tulça Sanjaks was primarily fuelled by Crimean Tatar, Nogai and Circassian Muhacir arriving only in the late 1850s or mid-1860s. 71,146 Crimean Tatar and 6,994 Circassian Muhacir accounted for the majority of the Muslim (126,924 people) and a plurality of the total population of Northern Dobruja, a region spun off from the Tulça vilayet and smaller parts of the Rusçuk and Varna Vilayets and transferred to Romania in 1878.

Male Population of the Danube Vilayet (exclusive of the Sanjak of Niš) in 1875 according to Tahrir-i Cedid (the Danube Vilayet printing press):

Ethnoconfessional Groups in the Danube Vilayet as per 1875 Ottoman Salname
1. Bulgarians (54.0%)
2. Establ. Muslims (36.2%)
3. Misc. Christians (2.74%)
4. Çerkes Muhacir (2.73%)
5. Muslim Romani (2.22%)
6. Christian Romani (0.68%)
7. Armenians (0.51%)
8. Jews (0.44%)
9. Greeks (0.37%)

Male Population of the Danube Vilayet (exclusive of the Sanjak of Niš) as per 1875 Ottoman Salname
Community	Rusçuk Sanjak	Vidin Sanjak	Varna Sanjak	Tırnova Sanjak	Tulça Sanjak	Sofya Sanjak	Danube Vilayet
Islam Millet	164,455 (53%)	20,492 (11%)	52,742 (61%)	88,445 (36%)	53,059 (61%)	27,001 (13%)	406,194 (36%)
Circassian Muhacir	16,588 (5%)	6,522 (4%)	4,307 (5%)	0 (0%)	2,954 (3%)	202 (0%)	30,573 (3%)
Muslim Roma	9,579 (3%)	2,783 (2%)	2,825 (3%)	6,545 (3%)	139 (0%)	2,964 (1%)	24,835 (2%)
Bulgar Millet	114,792 (37%)	131,279 (73%)	21,261 (25%)	148,713 (60%)	10,553 (12%)	179,202 (84%)	605,800 (54%)
Vlachs, Catholics, etc.	500 (0%)	14,690 (8%)	0 (0%)	0 (0%)	15,512 (18%)	0 (0%)	30,702 (3%)
Ermeni Millet	991 (0%)	0 (0%)	808 (1%)	0 (0%)	3,885 (4%)	0 (0%)	5,684 (1%)
Rum Millet	0 (0%)	0 (0%)	3,421 (4%)	494 (0%)	217 (0%)	0 (0%)	4,132 (0%)
Non-Muslims Romani people	1,790 (1%)	2,048 (1%)	331 (0%)	1,697 (1%)	356 (0%)	1,437 (1%)	7,659 (1%)
Yahudi Millet	1,102 (0%)	1,009 (1%)	110 (0%)	0 (0%)	780 (1%)	2,374 (1%)	5,375 (0%)
TOTAL	309,797 (100%)	178,823 (100%)	85,805 (100%)	245,894 (100%)	87,455 (100%)	213,180 (100%)	1,120,954 (100%)

The brutality accompanying the suppression of the Bulgarian April Uprising of 1876 and the atrocities committed by irregular Ottoman paramilitaries (primarily Circassian bashi-bazouk) caused outrage across Europe, including the United Kingdom, the hitherto closest Ottoman ally. The disproportionate use of brute force against both insurgents and non-combatants caused the Great Powers to convene the Conference of Constantinople in December 1876 to seek a solution to the Bulgarian Problem.

In conjunction with the Conference, most Great Powers prepared their own estimates for the population of the Danube Vilayet. Authors include Gabriel Aubaret, French Consul-General in Rusçuk; Ottoman army officer Stanislas Saint Clair; French scholars and orientalists Ubicini and Courteille; W.N. Jocelyn, Secretary of the British Embassy in Constantinople; Greek official Stavrides, translator at the British Embassy in Constantinople; Russian diplomats Vladimir Cherkassky and Russian diplomat Vladimir Teplov.

Total population of the Danube Vilayet according to Russian diplomat Vladimir Cherkassky from the Ottoman population register:

Total Population of the Danube Vilayet according to Cherkassky from the register, ca. 1876:
Sanjak	Muslims		Bulgarians		Others		Total
Sanjak	Number	%	Number	%	Number	%	Total
Rusçuk	381,224	61.53%	233,164	37.63%	5,186	0.84%	619,574
Vidin	59,654	17.66%	246,654	73.04%	31,398	9.30%	337,706
Tirnova	189,980	38.71%	300,820	61.29%	0	-	490,800
Tulça	112,300	63.34%	26,212	14.78%	38,788	21.88%	177,300
Varna	119,754	69.78%	43,180	25.16%	8,678	5.06%	171,612
Sofya	59,930	14.02%	362,714	84.87%	4,748	1.11%	427,392
Niş	77,500	21.63%	270,000	75.36%	10,800	3.01%	358,300
Danube Vilayet Total	1,000,342	38.73%	1,482,744	57.41%	99,598	3.86%	2,582,684

Male population of the Danube Vilayet in 1876 according to the Ottoman officer Stanislas Saint Clair:

Community	Population
Turk Muslims	457,018 (36%)
Other Muslims	104,639 (8%)
Bulgarian Christians	639,813 (50%)
Armenian Christians	2,128 (0%)
Vlach and Greek Christians	56,647 (4%)
Gypsies	8,220 (1%)
Jews	5,847 (0%)
TOTAL Danube Vilayet	1,274,282 (100%)

Total population of the Danube Vilayet (including Niş and Sofia sanjaks) according to the 1876 edition of Encyclopaedia Britannica:

Group	Population
Bulgarians	1,500,000 (63%)
Turks	500,000 (21%)
Tatars	100,000 (4%)
Circassians	90,000 (4%)
Albanians	70,000 (3%)
Romanians	40,000 (2%)
Gypsies	25,000 (1%)
Russians	10,000 (0%)
Armenians	10,000 (0%)
Jews	10,000 (0%)
Greeks	8,000 (0%)
Serbs	5,000 (0%)
Germans, Italians, Arabs and others	1,000 (0%)
TOTAL Danube Vilayet	2,369,000 (100%)

Total Population of the Danube Vilayet (excluding Niş sanjak) in 1876 estimated by the French counsel Aubaret from the register:

Community	Population
Muslims	1,120,000 (48%)
incl. Turks	774,000 (33%)
incl. Circassians	200,000 (8%)
incl. Tatars	110,000 (5%)
incl. Gypsies	35,000 (1%)
Non-Muslims	1,233,500 (52%)
incl. Bulgarians	1,130,000 (48%)
incl. Gypsies	12,000 (1%)
incl. Greeks	12,000 (1%)
incl. Jews	12,000 (1%)
incl. Armenians	2,500 (0%)
incl. Vlachs and others	65,000 (3%)
TOTAL Danube Vilayet	2,353,000 (100%)
