= Danube Province =

Danube Province can refer to the following:

- The former Danube Banovina of Yugoslavia
- The former Danube Vilayet of the Ottoman Empire
