= Census in the Ottoman Empire =

Mass population survey conducted in the Ottoman Empire

The Ottomans, rulers of Ottoman Empire, did develop a reasonably efficient system for counting the empire's population only a quarter century after census procedures were introduced in the United States of America , (Note: The first census after the American Revolution was taken in 1790) Great Britain , (Note: Decennial censuses of the general population started in 1801) and France. Four general censuses were held in the Ottoman Empire. These were 1831 census, 1881–82 census, 1905–06 census, and 1914 census. There were many special census, which Istanbul (Capital) is well known. There is considerable evidence that the census was taken throughout the empire, but it was accomplished under such severe difficulties that its results must be considered no more than estimates. The census takers were untrained and mostly unsupervised.

== Types ==
=== General Census ===
Sultan Mahmut II recorded the first general census as part of his effort to create a new army (Nizam-ı Cedid Army) and bureaucracy, a period known as Nizam-ı Cedid, following the destruction of the Janissary Corps, known as Auspicious Incident, in 1826. The first Ottoman general census was completed in 1831. To provide general supervision and control and to compile and keep empire-wide population records, a separate Census Department (Ceride-i Nufus Nezareti) was established for the first time as part of the Ministry of the Interior.

The 1831 census remained the only empire-wide count for official and private use for at least fifteen years, that was the beginning of Tanzimat. The Tanzimat provincial reforms included provisions for census counts as part of the process by which the tax and property systems were reformed. In fact that is a system, for military and tax which state based its existence, which constantly updated and provided very accurate population change. Local mayors (muhtars) and millet religious officers were assigned locally to count the people, to announce and enforce state regulations, and, ultimately, to issue the census receipts (niifus tezkeresi) and travel permits (murur tezkeresi) which became the basis for population control as well as for the count in subsequent decades.

=== Special Census ===
There were cities, regions that were essential to Ottomans. While empire-wide census reports performed only sporadically, these cities or regions had multiple tallies. The city Istanbul had tallies in 1835, 1838, 1844, and 1857. There are not yet been uncovered summaries distributed in Ottoman Archives (around the Europe and Middle East) after the dissolution and partitioning of the Empire.

== Department of the Census ==
The organizational structure of the Department of the Census (Niifus-u Umumi Idaresi) was an independent unit (mudurluk) in the Ministry of the Interior. It was separated from the army, that had its own personal records, and cadastral, that tracked the values for taxation reasons, departments. Department of the Census was divided into three major bureaus: for correspondence (Tahrirat Kalemi), statistics (Ihsaiyat Kalemi), and archives (Evrak Kalemi), with an additional Forwarding Department (Irsalat Memuriyet) which cared for the dispatch and receipt of correspondence. Outside the main office in the capital, the district staffs headed by directors (nazir) were assigned to each provincial capital to direct the work of the officials stationed along the Administrative divisions of the Ottoman Empire.

== Ottoman census system ==
Like the modern census system, the most important part is the initial compilation of permanent population registers (sicil-i niifus) in each village and each quarter of the larger towns and cities. Census scribes, in doing their job required to accompanied by the religious leaders and mayors, which the data recorded not just the name and characteristics of each person found in their districts, including for the first time their gender, "women" was included in the register sheet ahead of many counterparts.

The registration form was standardized. Standard form had types based on the persons stated religion. Separate registers for each recognized millet. All register pages numbered consecutively and sealed so that false pages could not be substituted for the real ones. Instead of the empty pages left at the ends of the original registers in previous censuses, separate registers of daily census changes (vukuat) were now introduced, with the kaza and provincial administrative councils being required to certify their accuracy before the information was sent on to Istanbul for incorporation into the empire-wide statistics. Printed information certificates were now provided, and most of the fees went to the local informants so that reports would be regular and prompt.

The census questions:

- Place of birth
- Gender (subsection for men; military status, the style of mustache, the style of beard)
- Residence
- Age
- Craft or occupation
- Marital status
- Health
- Religion

== Population Certificate ==
Population Certificate was an important paper to hold for the subject of the Ottoman Empire. During census each person recorded and counted in return with a signed and sealed Population Certificate (Nufus Tezkeresi), more or less a receipt for the registration, which contained the same information set down in the register.

All practical purpose Population Certificate served both as birth certificate and identity card and had to be produced in all governmental and legal dealings.

== Bibliography ==
- Shaw, Stanford J. (1978). "The Ottoman Census System and Population, 1831-1914". Nationalism and Ethnic Politics. 9 (3): 325–338. doi:10.1017/s0020743800033602.
