= Sanjak of Sofia =

Ottoman Empire subdivision

Sanjak of Sofia Sofia Sancağı Софийски санджак
- Sanjak of the Ottoman Empire
- ca. 1393–1878
- Capital: Sofia
- Population
  - 1520s: 25,910
- History
  - Established: ca. 1393
  - Treaty of Berlin (1878): 13 July 1878
Preceded by	Succeeded by
Second Bulgarian Empire	Principality of Bulgaria
- Today part of: Bulgaria

The Sanjak of Sofia (Turkish: Sofia Sancağı, Bulgarian: Софийски санджак) was one of the sanjaks of the Ottoman Empire which county town was Sofia. It was founded in 1393 and disestablished after the creation of the Principality of Bulgaria in 1878.

== History and Administration ==
The Sanjak of Sofia was established around 1393. Initially it had two nahiyahs: Znepolje and Visok. Its first sanjakbey was Ince Balaban, also referred to as 'the conqueror of Sofia'. One of its sanjakbeys was Malkoçoğlu Ali Bey, a member of the Malkoçoğlu family, who died in 1514.

Soon after the establishment of the sanjak, Sofia became the seat of the Rumelia Eyalet. Although the beglerbegs of Rumelia in early periods sometimes stayed in Bitola, Sofia remained the seat and center of the Rumelia Eyalet. Since it was a seat of the Rumelian beglerbey, the Sanjak of Sofia had a status of Pasha Sanjak (Turkish: Paşa Sancağı), or the main sanjak of the Elayet.

The Sanjak of Sofia and its 50 timars were registered for tax purposes in 1446 and 1455, and also in 1488/1489 and 1491. In the 1520s around 6.1% of the total population (25,910) of the Sanjak of Sofia were Muslims. At the end of the 16th and beginning of the 17th century Niš belonged to the Sanjak of Sofia.

At the end of the 18th century, it was under frequent attacks by Osman Pazvantoglu. In the period 1846-1864 the Sanjak of Sofia belonged to the Niš Eyalet while from 1864 to 1878 it belonged to the Danube Vilayet. At that time it had the following kazas: Sofia, Kyustendil, Samokov, Dupnica, Radomir, Zlatica, Orhanie and Džumaja.

== Disestablishment ==
After the decisions of the Berlin Congress were signed on 13 July 1878, the Sanjak of Sofia was merged with Northern Bulgaria into the Principality of Bulgaria, a de facto independent vassal of the Ottoman Empire, except for the kaza of Džumaja (also called Cuma-i Bala), which was passed to the newly founded Sanjak of Gümülcine.
