= Stanislas Saint Clair =

Ottoman-British military officer of Scottish and Polish-Lithuanian descent (1835–1887)

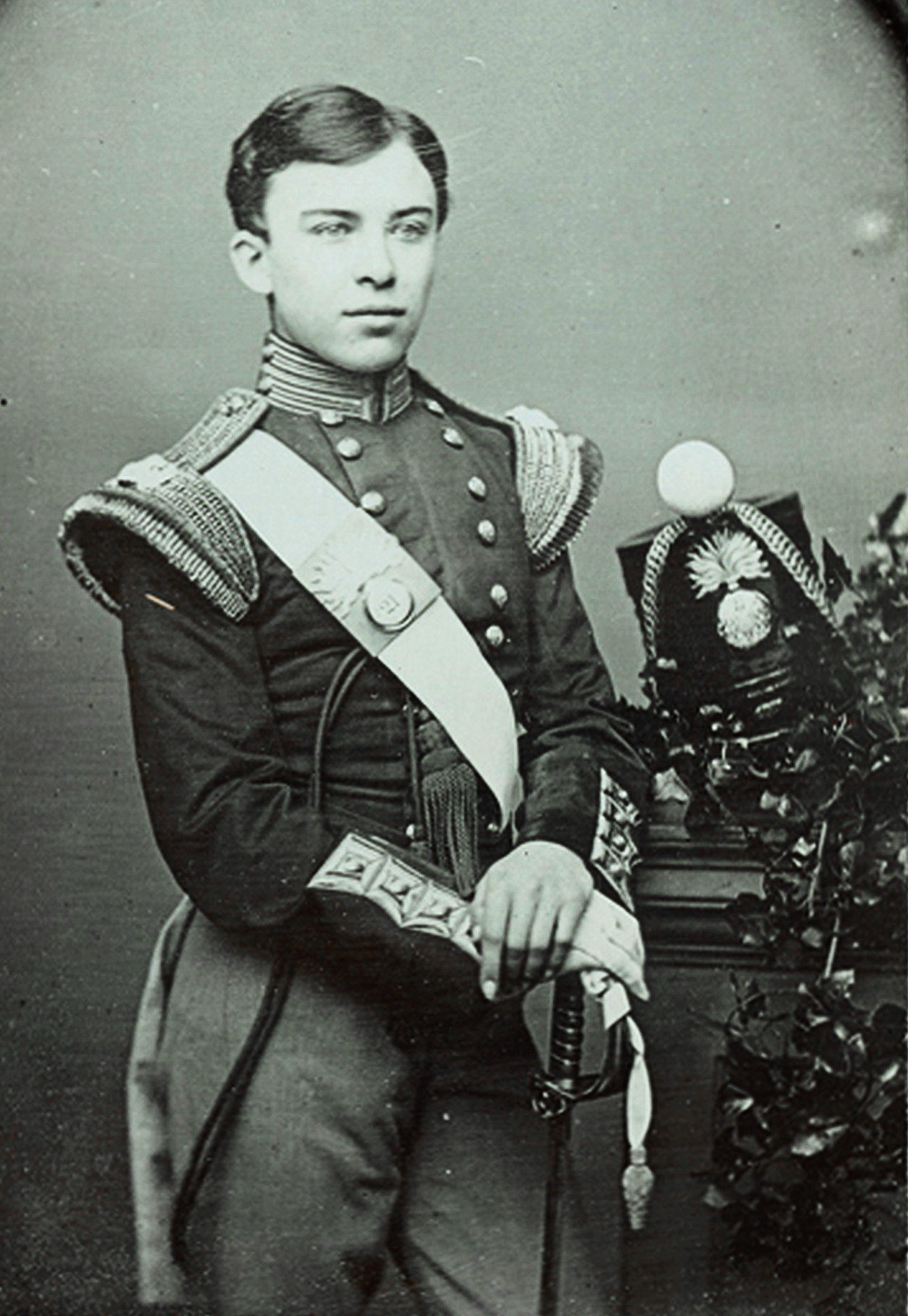
Young Stanislas in military attire

Stanislas Graham Bower Saint Clair (24 January 1835 in Wieprze – 24 January 1887 in Ligneuville), nom de guerre Hidayet Pasha was a British officer, Polish-Lithuanian rebel, and later an Ottoman military officer of mixed Scottish and Polish-Lithuanian background.

He is most notable for an 1878 Muslim insurgence he organized in the Rhodope mountains in Principality of Bulgaria. The insurgence planned to attack Bulgarian civilians and forces of the Russian Empire in order to claim back to the Ottoman Empire the territories ceded to Principality of Bulgaria under the Treaty of San Stefano. The insurgence was defeated by the Imperial Russian Army and Captain Petko Voyvoda's detachment.

== Early life and education ==
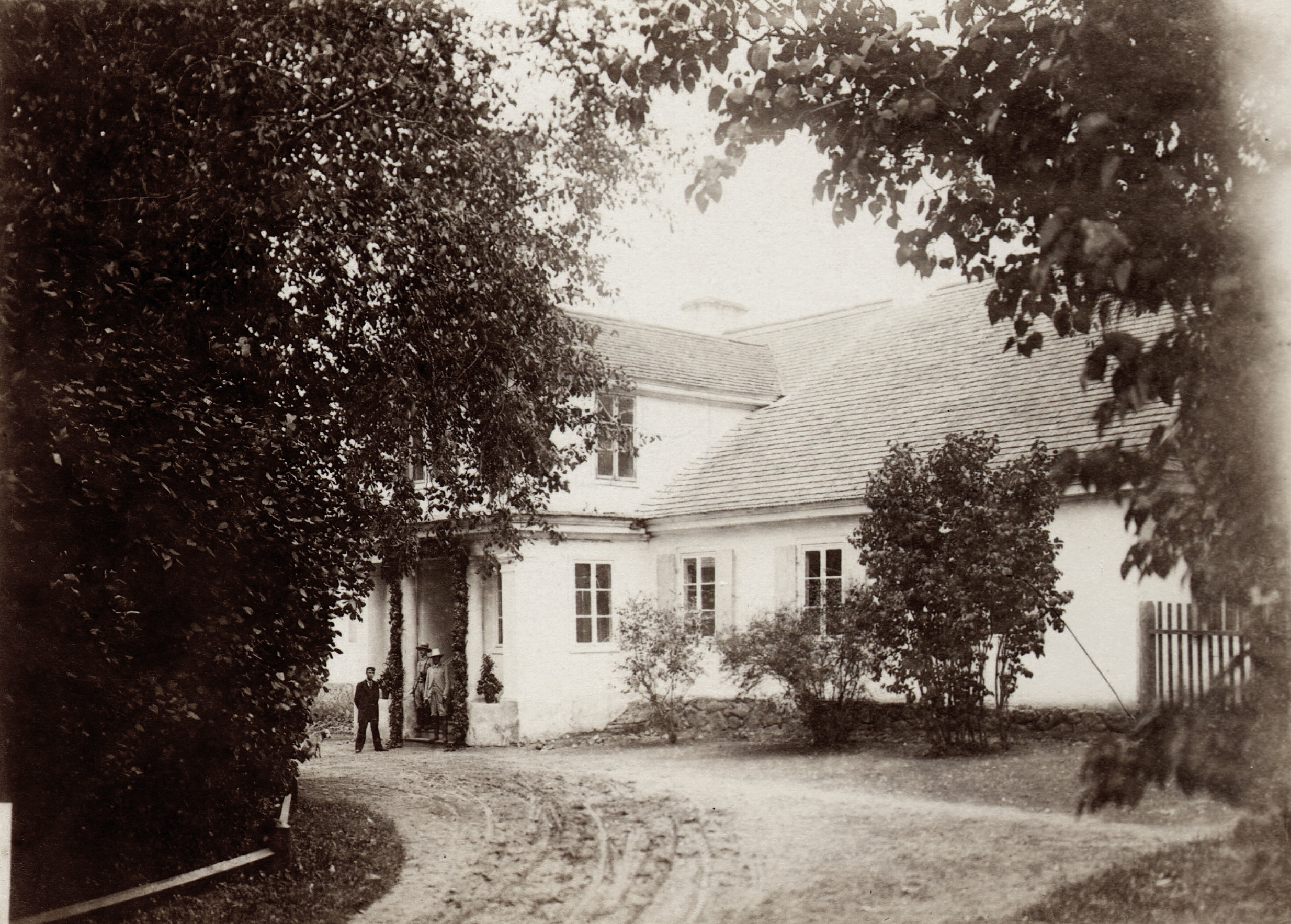
Stanislas' childhood home in Vepriai

Stanislas Saint Clair was born in 1835 in his maternal grandfather's mansion of Vepriai, Vilna Governorate of the Russian Empire (now Ukmergė district of Lithuania), which partially survives to this day.

His father, Alexander Saint Clair (1800–1880) was a former military officer from the British colonial army in British India and a Scottish nobleman. His mother, Pelagia Kossakowska (1798–1881), was a Polish-Lithuanian noblewoman. His maternal grandfather was count Jozef Dominik Kossakowski, one of the commanders in the November Uprising against Russian rule. His maternal grandmother was Ludwika Zofia Kossakowska-Potocka.

As of 1855, Saint Clair's family had sold their mansion in Vepriai to Podbereski family. Brought up with strong Polish identity of his family, he perceived struggle against tsarist Russia as his patriotic duty and this led him to his Balkan activities.

== Career ==
Being a son of a military officer, Saint Clair joined the British Army and took part in the Crimean War. He was promoted to the rank of captain in 1859. After the war, in 1862 he started work as a clerk in the British counselate in Burgas, then part of the Ottoman Empire. Two years later, he became a British consul in Varna. At that time, however, he frequently visited his home country, where in 1863 he joined the anti-Russian January Uprising that failed. In Bulgaria, he purchased an estate (a chiflik) in Akdere, intending to settle in the Ottoman Empire. Around this time he started calling himself Hidayet Pasha ("the Guided General") thus claiming a military rank (pasha is the Ottoman equivalent of a general) that was never assigned to him. Around this time Saint Clair co-authored a book with Charles Brophy titled "A Residence in Bulgaria. Notes on the resources and the administration of Turkey", published in 1869 in London. The book contains a negative portrayal of Bulgarians.

Upon the start of the Russo-Turkish War (1877-78) he formally left British military service and volunteered as an officer in the Ottoman Army under Suleiman Pasha's command, later promoted to the rank of Birindji ferik (General). His adjutant was the Englishman John Paget and his deputy - a Pole Konrad Bey. After the retreat of the Ottoman army from Sofia and their defeat at Plovdiv, Ottoman troops scattered towards the Rhodope mountains and Istanbul. Saint Clair retreated with Suleyman pasha and found himself in the vicinity of Kardzhali.

After the Ottoman Empire's capitulation in the war, he conspired with several Ottoman army deserters to start a Muslim insurgence in the Rhodope mountains. Their propaganda efforts aimed to scare Turkish villagers with the rising "rule of the infidels" and make them believe there would soon be retributions for the massacres of Christians during the April Uprising in Bulgaria. The anti-Bulgarian and anti-Russian nature of Saint Clair's activities soon found the implicit support of the Ottoman and the British empires, both of them hoping to revise the Treaty of San Stefano on terms favourable to Turkey.

The insurgence led by Saint Clair started in mid-1878 and affected an area in the Middle Rhodopes. The insurgents were first met at the village of Plevun where they were held back by Captain Petko Voyvoda's 9-men detachment. Russian reinforcements soon arrived and the insurgents dispersed, quickly abandoning their cause.

== Later life and death ==
In 1877 tried in vain to organise a Polish Legion in the Ottoman Army. After the Treaty of Berlin, the autonomous province of Eastern Rumelia was created and Saint Clair applied for the post of Governor General. After he learned he was not considered for the post, he retired from political affairs and left for Belgium without achieving the purpose of his ill-fated "insurgency".

He died in his own home in Ligneuville (now Malmedy) Belgium, on 24 January 1887. Married twice, left three daughters.
