= Plevun =

- Village
- Location within Bulgaria
- Coordinates: 41°27′N 26°01′E
- Country: Bulgaria
- Province: Haskovo Province
- Municipality: Ivaylovgrad
- Time zone: UTC+2 (EET)
  - Summer (DST): UTC+3 (EEST)

Plevun (Bulgarian: Плевун, Greek: Πλαβού) is a village in the municipality of Ivaylovgrad, in Haskovo Province, in southern Bulgaria.

The name of the village, derives from its Greek name during the Middle Ages, "Παλαιοβοῦνι" (Paleovouni).
