= Niš Eyalet =

Administrative division of the Ottoman Empire from 1846 to 1864

Eyālet-i Nīş
- Eyalet of the Ottoman Empire
- 1846–1864
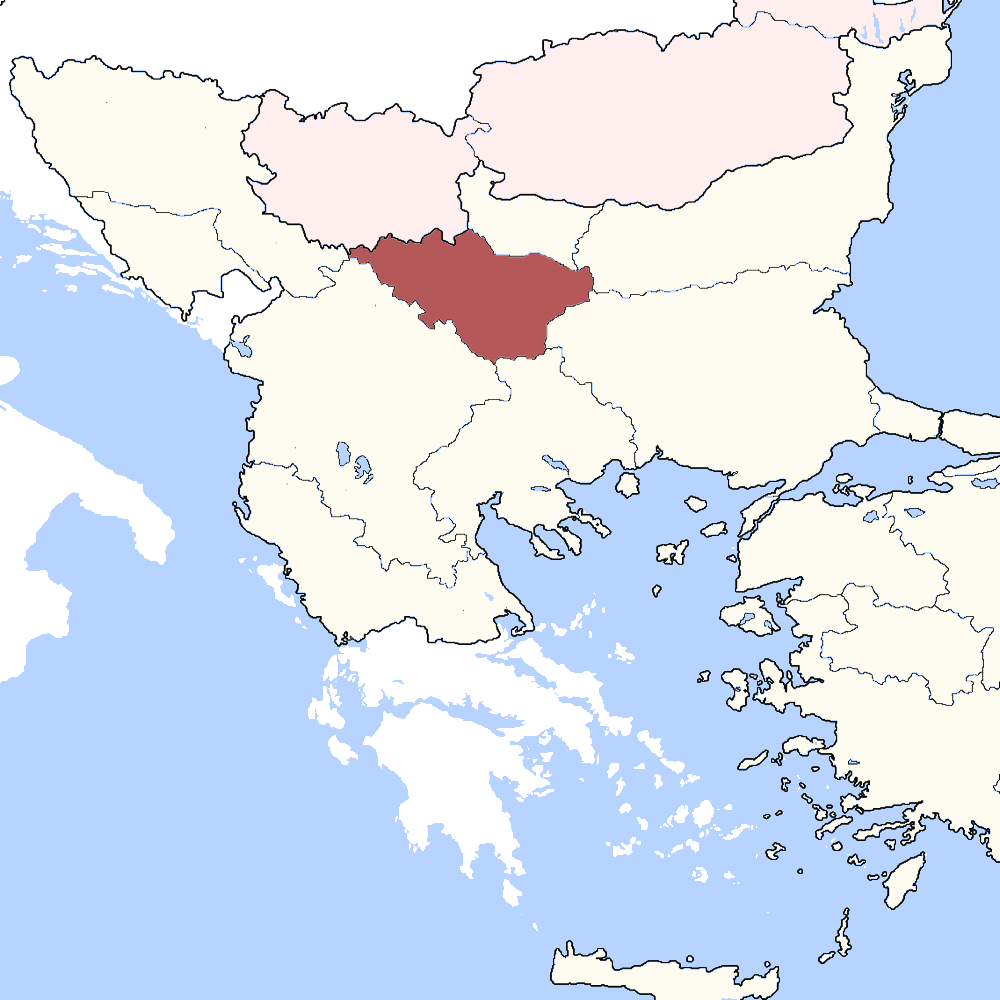
- The Niš Eyalet in the 1850s
- Capital: Niš
- Area
  - Coordinates: 43°18′N 21°54′E
- Government
- Governor
  - 1861-1864: Midhat Pasha (last)
- History
  - Established: 1846
  - Disestablished: 1864
Preceded by	Succeeded by
Monastir Eyalet	Danube Vilayet
- Today part of: Serbia; Bulgaria

Niš Eyalet (Ottoman Turkish: ایالت نیش; Eyālet-i Nīş) or Pashaluk of Niš was an administrative territorial entity of the Ottoman Empire located in the territory of present-day southern Serbia and western Bulgaria. It was formed in 1846 and its administrative centre was Niš. It was incorporated into the Danube Vilayet in 1864.

== History ==
The Niš Eyalet was created in 1846 from the dismemberment of the ancient Rumelia Eyalet, once the largest and most important province of the Ottoman Empire.

In 1861, Midhat Pasha was put in charge of the Niš Eyalet. He was a reformer influenced by Western ideas and the eyalet became a showpiece of the reformist movement. He tackled the problems of communications and security: he set up a system of block-houses to stop the incursion of armed bands from Serbia. According to his laudatory son's biography of him, "he organized a gendarmerie, secured the peaceful collection of taxes, and put an end to all religious persecution."

He also established schools and hospitals for members of all religious groups without discrimination. Midhat's reforms were so successful that they inspired a reworking of the Ottoman system. In 1864, the council of state decided that the eyalets would be replaced by larger vilayets. At each of these main levels of rule, there would be mixed Muslim-Christian councils.

The first of the vilayets was run for a time by Midhat Pasha and it included the former Niš Eyalet and much of Bulgaria and was called the "Danube Vilayet." In the next three years, he carried through a large program of school-building and other public works, as well as introducing a provincial newspaper.

== Administrative divisions ==
Sanjaks of the Eyalet in the mid-19th century:

- Sanjak of Niš (seat)
- Sanjak of Sofia
- Sanjak of Samokov
- Sanjak of Kyustendil

== See also ==
- History of Serbia
- History of Bulgaria
