= Vladimir Cherkassky =

Russian politician (1821–1878)

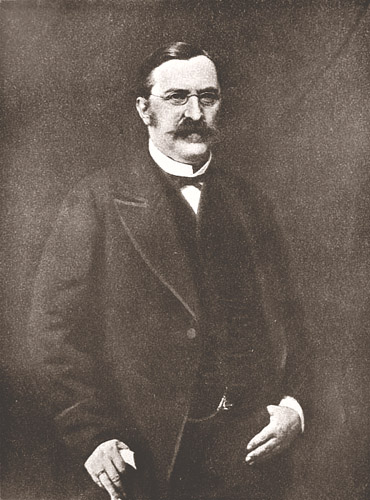

Moscow's Gorodskoy Golova (Московский городской голова)
- In office 1869–1871

Personal details
- Born: 13 April 1821 Tula Province, Russian Empire
- Died: 3 March 1878 (aged 56) San Stefano, Ottoman Empire

Vladimir Alexandrovich Cherkassky (Russian: Владимир Александрович Черкасский; 13 April 1821 – 3 March 1878) was a slavophil Russian politician and first head of the provisional Russian Administration in Bulgaria.

== Biography ==
Born into a princely family, Cherkassky studied law at Moscow State University. He supported the Emancipation reform of 1861 which abolished serfdom in Russia.
