= Vidin Eyalet =

Administrative division of the Ottoman Empire from 1846 to 1864

Eyalet-i Vidin
- Eyalet of the Ottoman Empire
- 1846–1864
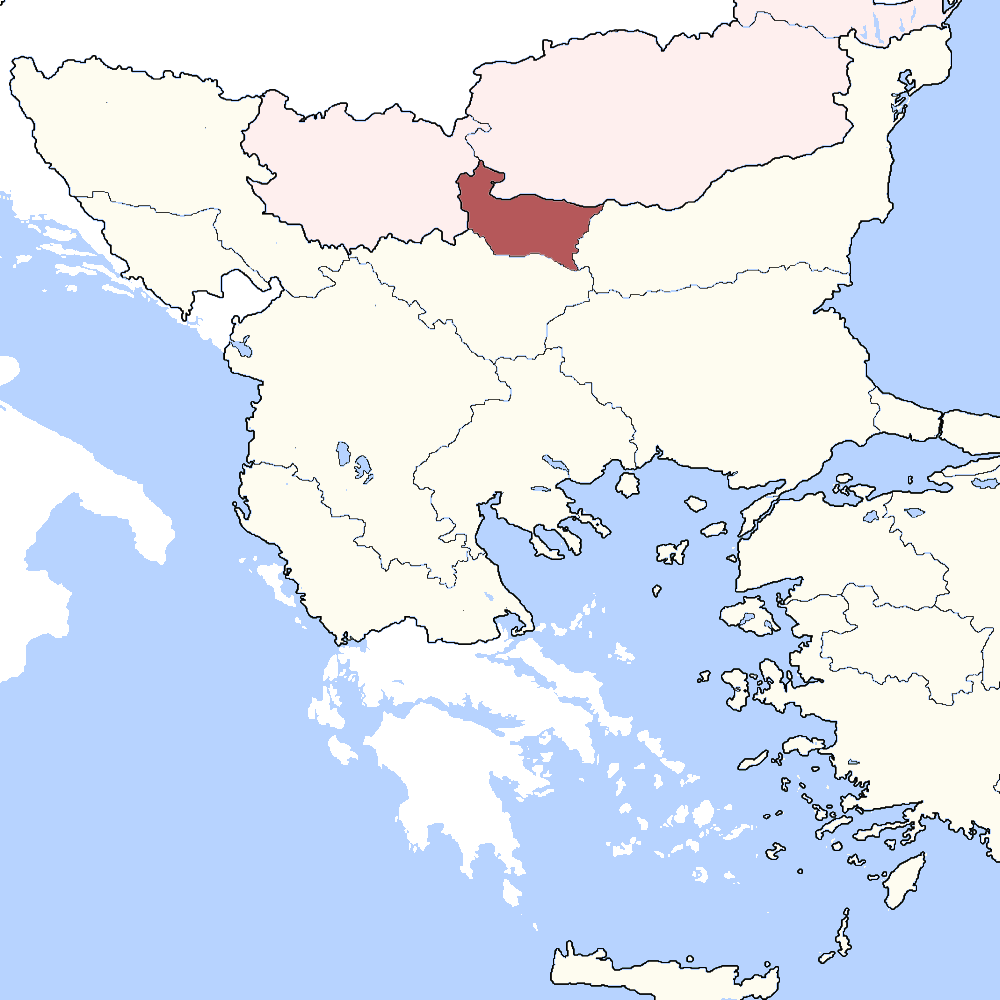
- The Vidin Eyalet in the 1850s
- Capital: Vidin
- Area
  - Coordinates: 43°59′N 22°52′E
- History
  - Established: 1846
  - Disestablished: 1864
Preceded by	Succeeded by
Monastir Eyalet	Danube Vilayet

The Eyalet of Vidin (Ottoman Turkish: ایالت ویدین; Eyālet-i Vīdīn) was an administrative territorial entity of the Ottoman Empire located in the territory of present-day north-western Bulgaria. It was formed in 1846 and its administrative centre was Vidin. It was incorporated into Danube Province in 1864 and its sanjaks were reduced to townships except Vidin.

== Administrative divisions ==
Sanjaks of the Eyalet in the mid-19th century:

1. Sanjak of Tirnova
2. Sanjak of Vidin
3. Sanjak of Lom

== See also ==
- Ottoman Bulgaria
- Osman Pazvantoğlu
