= Abdolonyme Ubicini =

French historian and journalist (1818–1884)

La constitution ottomane du 7 zilhidjé 1293 (23 décembre 1876) Expliquée et Annotée par A. Ubicini ("The Ottoman Constitution of 7 zilhidjé 1293 (23 December 1876) explained and annotated A. Ubicini")

Jean-Henri-Abdolonyme Ubicini (20 October 1818 – 28 October 1884) was a French historian, journalist and honorary member of the Romanian Academy.

He was born in Issoudun, Indre in a middle-class family originating in Lombardy. After studying in his native town as well as in Versailles, in 1839 he became a rhetoric teacher at Joigny. Beginning with 1844, he took extensive journeys through Italy, Greece and the Ottoman Empire. While in Bucharest, he took part in the Wallachian Revolution of 1848, becoming secretary of the provisional government and of the Princely Lieutenancy. When the combined Russian and Ottoman forces suppressed the revolution, he left Wallachia for Constantinople, where he spent some time before returning to France.

Settling at Paris, he published several studies on the Ottoman Empire and the Danubian Principalities, among the more important being Lettres sur la Turquie ("Letters on Turkey"). He founded the journal Revue de l'Orient and contributed to several other journals, such as Le Siècle, La Presse and Courier de Paris. In his writings, Ubicini usually adopted a pro-Romanian point of view.

In 1867 he received Romanian citizenship.

== Works ==
- On the Ottoman Constitution: Ubicini, Abdolonyme (1877). La constitution ottomane du 7 zilhidjé 1293 (23 décembre 1876) Expliquée et Annotée par A. Ubicini. Paris: A. Cotillon et C^{o.}. - PDF file
- with Abel Pavet de Courteille. État présent de l'empire ottoman. Dumaine, 1876. Available at Google Books
