= 1831 census of the Ottoman Empire =

1831 census of the population of the Ottoman Empire

1831 census of the Ottoman Empire was the first available population information in the West. The Europeans estimates before this census, some of whom, such as William Eton, David Urquhart, Georg Hassel was based on their personal assumptions which in these publications claimed to be gathered from Ottoman court. (Note: Ottoman court refers to the government of Ottoman Empire)

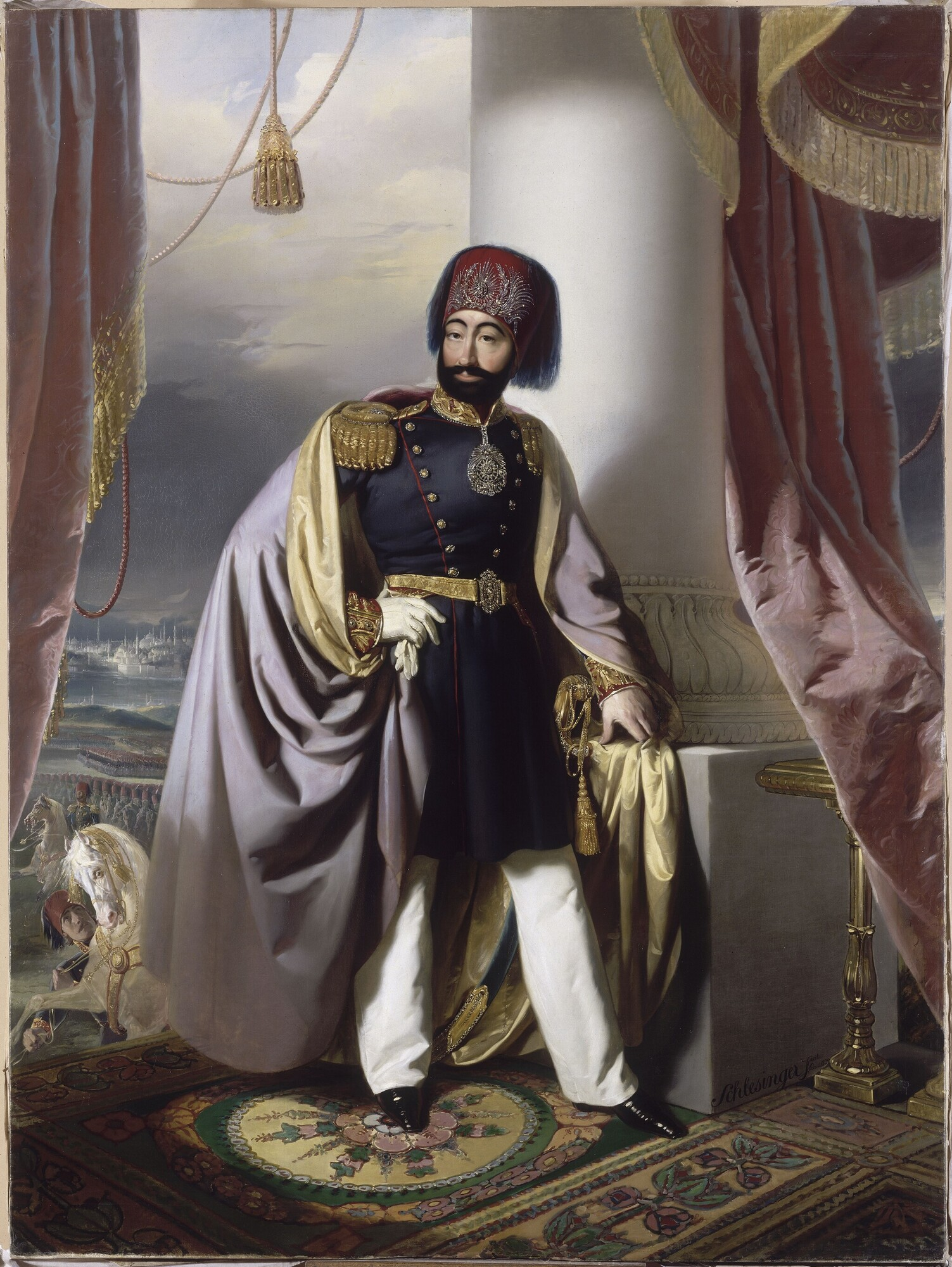
Mahmud II, orderer of the first population census in Europe

The "first" modern Ottoman census was conducted beginning in 1828/29 in both Europe and Anatolia. It was required after the Auspicious Incident in 1826. Many of the old customs and procedures changed at this census. Advent of the war with Russia in 1828-1829 prevented generalization of these procedures.

== Result of census ==
Taxable population was enumerated, i.e. healthy men over 15 years old.

Eyalet	Muslim	Rayah	Gypsies	Jews	Armenians	Total
Eyâlet-i Rumeli	513.448	811.456	29.532	11.674	3.566	1.369.766
Eyâlet-i Silistre	150.970	96.342	8.779	178	0	256.269
Eyâlet-i Anadolu	1.988.027	366.625	7.143	5.338	16.743	2.383.876
Eyâlet-i Karaman	229.242	34.461	0	0	0	263.703
Eyâlet-i Sivas	278.037	49.593	60	0	0	327.690
Eyâlet-i Adana	85.781	2.361	481	0	2.727	91.850
Eyâlet-i Cezâir-i Bahr-i Sefîd	109.419	121.719	816	127	773	232.224
Eyâlet-i Trabzon	125.121	11.431	0	0	0	136.552
Eyâlet-i Çıldır	73.282	0	191	0	4.887	78.360
Eyâlet-i Kars	17.580	0	0	0	2.161	19.741
Total	3.570.907	1.493.988	47.002	17.139	30.857	5.159.871

== Bibliography ==
- Karpat, K.H. (1985). Ottoman population, 1830-1914: demographic and social characteristics. Madison, Wis: University of Wisconsin Pres. pp. 242.
